= Security guard =

Person employed to protect properties or people

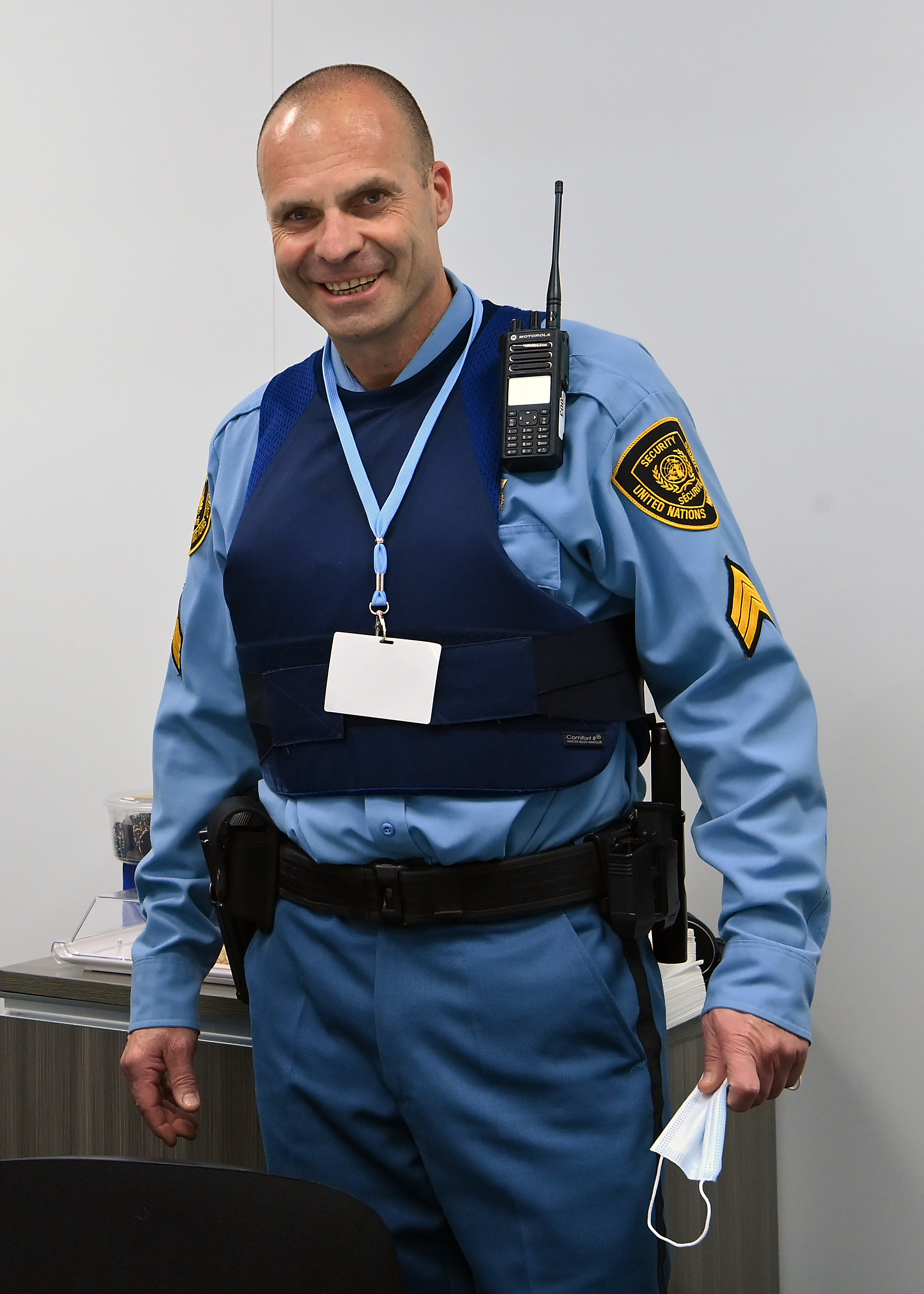
- A United Nations security guard at the SEC Centre in Glasgow, Scotland during COP26

Occupation
- Occupation type: Employment
- Activity sectors: Security

Description
- Related jobs: Usher, bouncer, doorman, bodyguard, hall monitor, armored car guard, loss prevention officer, Store detective

A security guard (also known as a security officer, security inspector, factory guard, or protective agent) is a person employed by an organization or individual to protect their assets from a variety of hazards (e.g. crime, waste, damage, unsafe behavior, etc.) by enforcing preventative measures. These assets may include property, people, equipment, money, housing societies, etc. Guards protect them by maintaining a high-visibility presence to deter illegal and inappropriate actions. They may do that by looking (either directly through patrols or indirectly by monitoring alarm systems or video surveillance cameras) for signs of crime or other hazards and taking action to minimize the damage. The actions can include warning and escorting trespassers off property, reporting incidents to clients, reporting to emergency services, and informing police or emergency medical services as appropriate.

Security guards are generally uniformed in order to represent their lawful authority to protect private property. They are generally governed by legal regulations that set out eligibility requirements, such as a criminal record check, fitness levels, and permits or licenses needed from local authorities. Several countries prescribe a preference in hiring veterans or people with experience in police or paramilitary services. The authorities permitted for security guards vary by country and sub-national jurisdiction. They are hired by a range of organizations, including businesses, government departments and agencies, and not-for-profit organizations.

Until the 1980s, the term watchman was more commonly used for this function, a usage dating back at least to the Middle Ages. This term was carried over to North America, where it was interchangeable with night watchman until modern security-based titles replaced both terms. Security guards are sometimes regarded as fulfilling the function of private policing.

== Functions and duties ==
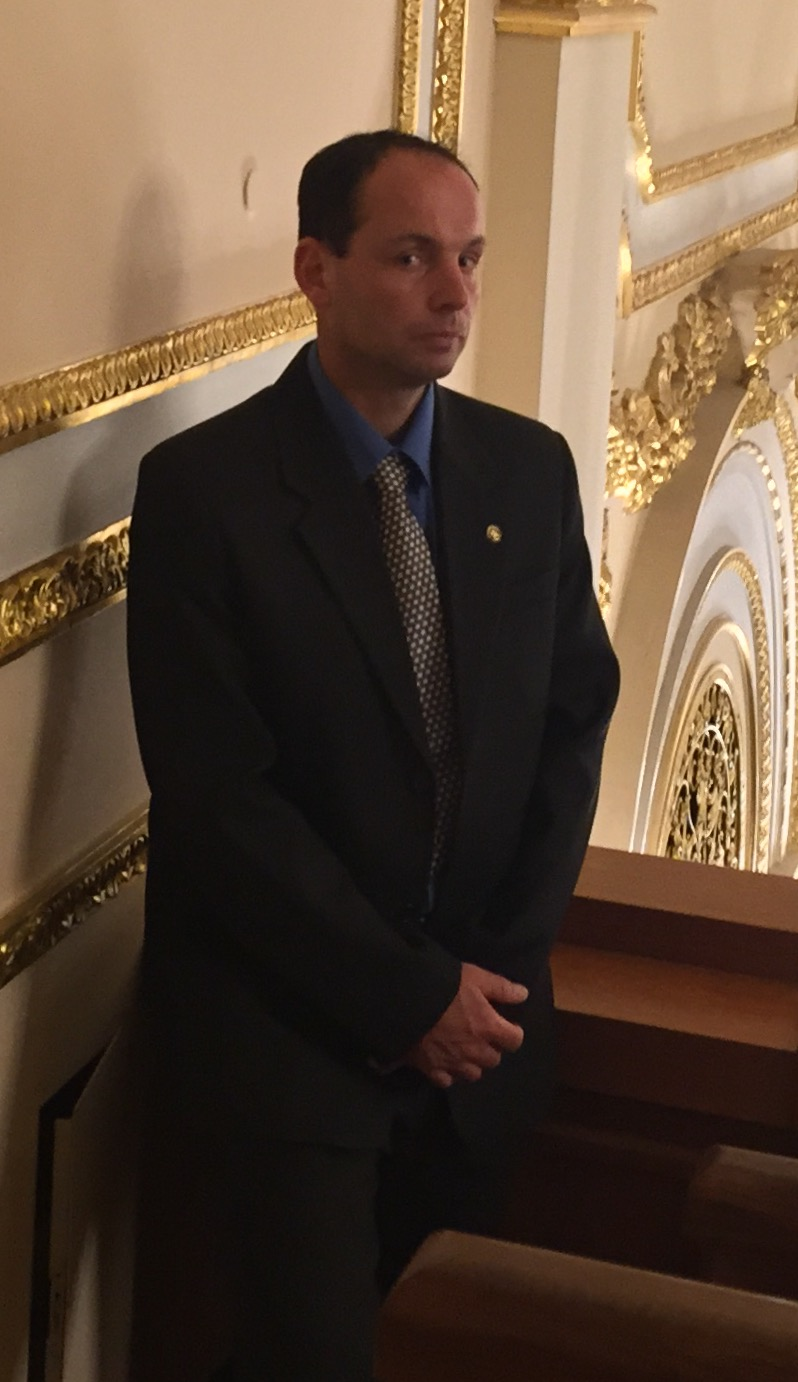
Bodyguard protects Members of Parliament during public visits by visitors in the Chamber of Deputies of the Czech Republic in 2015.

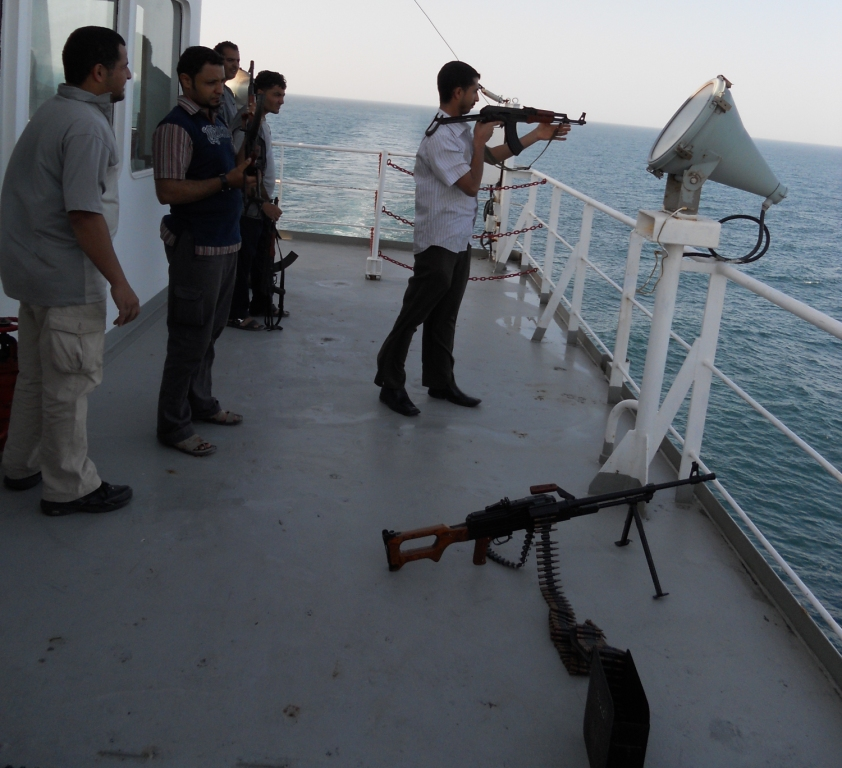
Private guard escort on a merchant ship providing security services against pirates.

Many security firms and proprietary security departments practice the "detect, deter, observe, and report" method. Security guards are usually not required to make arrests, but have the authority to make a citizen's arrest and detain suspects, or otherwise act as an agent of law enforcement, for example, at the request of a police officer or a sheriff. Some security guards may also be armed, with functions similar to an auxiliary police.

A private security guard's responsibility is to protect their client from a variety of hazards. Security personnel enforce company rules, can act to protect lives and property, and sometimes have a contractual obligation to do so. Apart from deterrence, they are often trained to perform specialized tasks, including arresting or controlling suspects, operating emergency equipment, administering first aid and CPR, taking accurate notes (vehicle numbers or persons entering and exiting), and writing reports of security incidents, among other things. Several countries mandate that guards have training in carrying weapons—batons, firearms, pepper spray, etc. The Bureau of Security and Investigative Services in California requires a license for each item that must be carried while on duty. Some guards are required to complete police certification for special duties. They may also be required to have bomb threat or emergency crisis training, especially those stationed in soft target areas. Security guards may also progress into specialised roles such as cash-in-transit, close protection, investigations, training, or security management as they gain experience and additional qualifications.

One major economic justification for security guards is that insurance companies (particularly fire insurance carriers) will offer substantial rate discounts to sites with a 24-hour presence, as there is lower risk of damage to the insured asset. For a high-risk or high-value property, the discount can often exceed the cost of its security program. The presence of security guards, particularly when combined with effective security procedures, also tends to reduce shrinkage, theft, employee misconduct, safety rule violations, property damage, and even sabotage. Many casinos hire security guards to protect money when transferring it to the casino's bank.

Guards may also perform access control at building entrances and vehicle gates, ensuring that employees and visitors present proper passes or identification before entering the facility, or pay user charges. Armed guards are frequently contracted to respond as law enforcement personnel, until official authorities arrive. Patrolling is usually a major part of duties, as most incidents are prevented by being on the lookout. Often, these patrols are logged using a guard tour patrol system that requires them to be conducted regularly. Regular patrols are, however, becoming less accepted as an industry standard, as they provide predictability for the would-be criminal, as well as monotony for the security officer on duty. Random patrols are easily programmed into electronic systems, allowing greater freedom of movement and unpredictability.

== Personnel ==
=== Types of security personnel ===
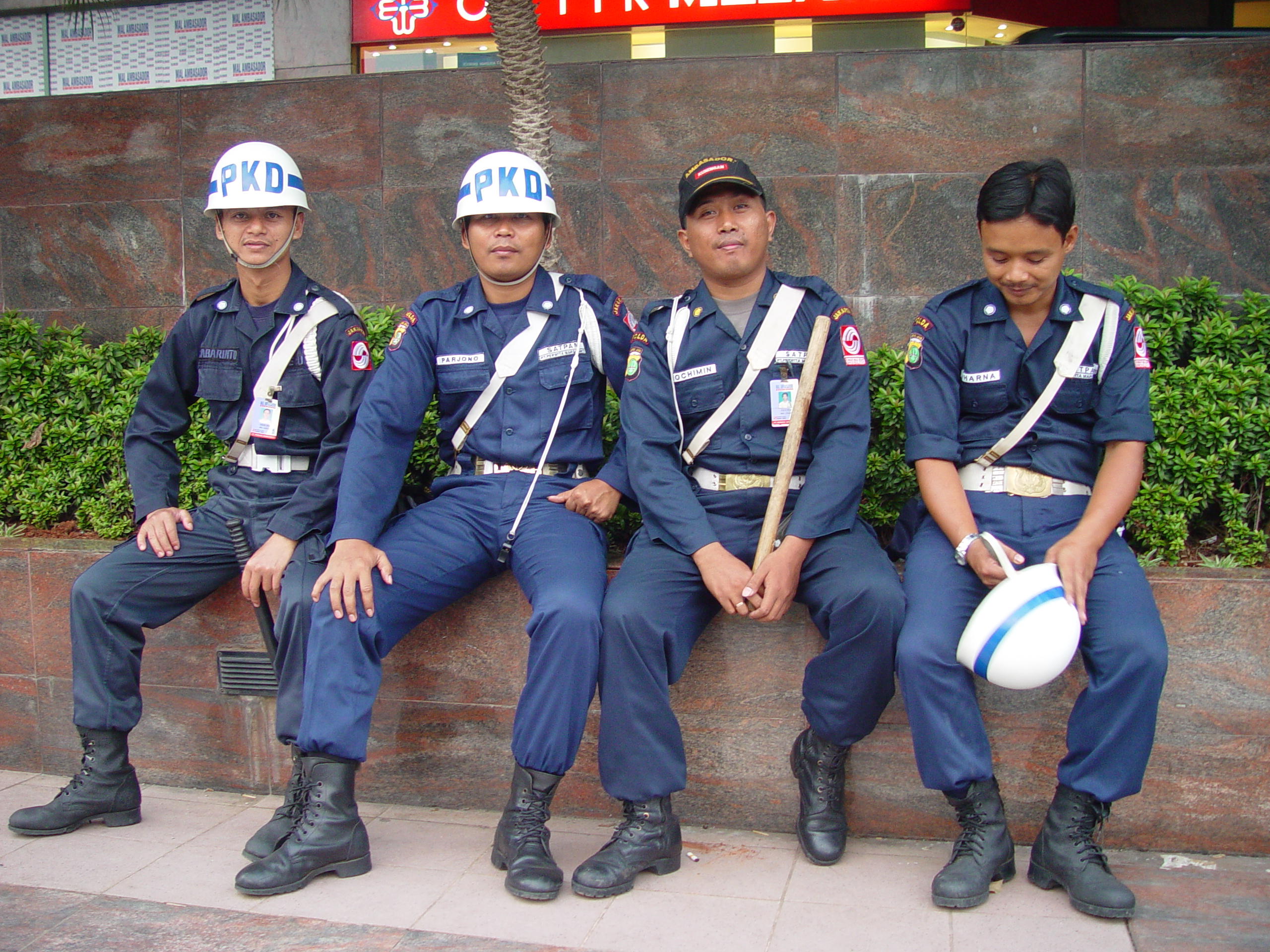
Mall parking lot security guards (satpam) in Jakarta, Indonesia

Security personnel may be classified as one of the following, though there are no consistent international definitions:

- In-house, private, or proprietary security (i.e., employed by the same company or organization they protect, such as a mall, theme park, or casino)
  - Retail loss prevention, asset protection, or store detectives; "In-house" personnel who provide (generally plainclothes) security to stores and malls, with the specific aim of preventing and deterring theft and detaining shoplifters
  - Hotel detectives, also known as house detectives were "in-house", plainclothes security personnel employed by hotels. This position is largely obsolete and has been replaced with position titles such as "security guard" or "security officer". Hotel detectives feature heavily within noir fiction. American films that feature hotel detectives include Listen Lester (1924), The Lone Wolf Strikes (1940), One Thrilling Night (1942), and Don't Bother to Knock (1952).
- Contract security, working for a private security company which is contracted by other entities or individuals to provide security services
- Public security, individuals employed or appointed as a security officer by a government or government agency, generally for the employing/appointing agency
- Parapolice, private security firms that routinely engage in criminal investigations and may hold police powers.
- A security receptionist is a person who performs duties that combine some or most of the work of a traditional receptionist, in addition to the duties that pertain to security functions. For example, identity verification, issuing visitors' passes, and observing or reporting any suspicious persons or unusual activity.

=== Terminology and titles ===
Industry terms for security personnel include security guard, security officer, security agent, safety patrol, security enforcement officer, and public safety. Terms for specialized jobs include usher, bouncer, bodyguard, executive protection agent, loss prevention, alarm responder, hospital security officer, mall security officer, crime prevention officer, patrolman, private patrol officer, and private patrol operator.

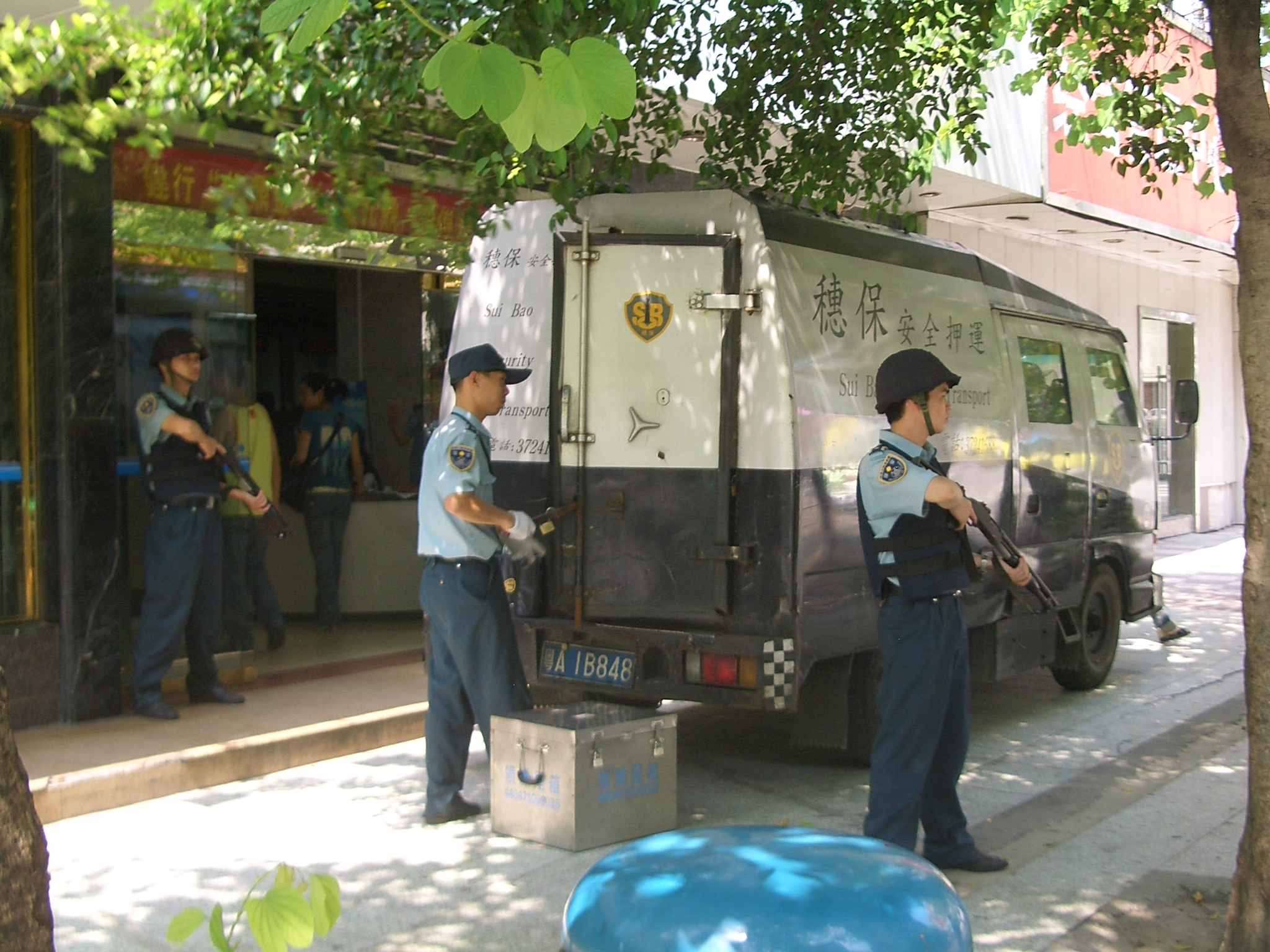
Armored car with a crew of security guards in Guangzhou, China

State and local governments sometimes regulate the use of these terms by law—words and phrases that give an impression of official authority. For example, California doesn't allow security licensees to use designations that "give an impression that he or she is connected in any way with the federal government, a state government, or any political subdivision of a state government". The terms "private homicide police" or "special agent" would thus be unlawful for a security licensee to use in California. Similarly, in Canada, various acts specifically prohibit private security personnel from using the terms probation officer, law enforcement, police, or police officer.

Alberta and Ontario prohibit the use of the term security officer, which has been widely used in the United States for many decades. Recent changes have also introduced restrictions on the uniform and vehicle colors and markings to ensure private security personnel are clearly distinguishable from police personnel. Some sources feel that some of these restrictions are put in place to satisfy the Canadian Police Association. Specialized VIP security guard services and companies are in high demand to protect celebrities and executives during unrest. There is a marked difference between persons performing the duties historically associated with security guards and persons who take a more active role in protecting persons and property. The former, often called "guards", are taught the philosophy "observe and report". They are minimally trained and are not expected to deal with the public or confront criminals.

Security guards may be highly trained and armed, depending on legal provisions and contracts agreed upon with clients. They are more likely to interact with the general public and confront criminal elements. There is sometimes little relationship between duties performed and compensation; for example, some mall "security officers" who are exposed to serious risks earn less per hour than "industrial security guards" who have less training and responsibility. The term "agent" can be confusing in the security industry because it can describe a civil legal relationship between an employee and their employer or contractor ("agent of the owner" in California PC 602), and also can describe a person in government service ("Special Agent Jones of the Federal Bureau of Investigation".) In the United States, the term "agent" may be confused with bail enforcement agents, also known as "bounty hunters", who are often regulated by the same agencies that regulate private security. The term "agent" is also used in other industries, such as banking, loans, and real estate. Security agents are often employed in loss prevention and personal or executive protection (bodyguards) roles. They typically work in plainclothes (without a uniform), and are usually highly trained to act lawfully in direct defense of life or property.

=== Powers and authority ===
Security officers are typically bound by the same laws and regulations as the individuals they are contracted to serve and, therefore, are generally not allowed to represent themselves as law enforcement under penalty of law. There are exceptions to this, as some jurisdictions provide law enforcement commissions or license to certain security personnel; Such personnel are generally given special police commissions or licenses. For example, in the City of Boston, Massachusetts, many private entities and businesses formerly either hired personnel directly or contracted companies that employed "special police officers" (SPOs). SPOs were licensed by the City of Boston under the Boston Police Department (BPD) Rules and Procedures, specifically "Rule 400" and "Rule 400A". "Rule 400" was reserved for private entities (security guards, etc.), while "400A" was used for City of Boston employees requiring police powers. (Note: For example: Boston School Police, Boston Code Police, Boston Housing Authority Police, certain Boston Fire Department personnel, and any other city personnel that were not sworn law enforcement officers via other means but may require such powers in the course of their duties.) "Rule 400" and "400A" SPOs were trained through a BPD-approved academy and had full police powers while on or near property they were employed or contracted to protect. Boston SPOs were also authorized to issue civil citations using BPD-issued citation books. However, as of 1 July 2021, all Rule 400/A SPOs were stripped of their police powers and the automatic right to carry a firearm on-duty, due to the passage of Massachusetts bill S.2963, the 'Police Reform Act.'

In rare cases, some law enforcement powers are conferred on security guards while on duty. For example, South Carolina law provides that licensed security personnel are "granted the authority and arrest power given to sheriff's deputies" while "on the property on which [they are] employed."

== Training ==
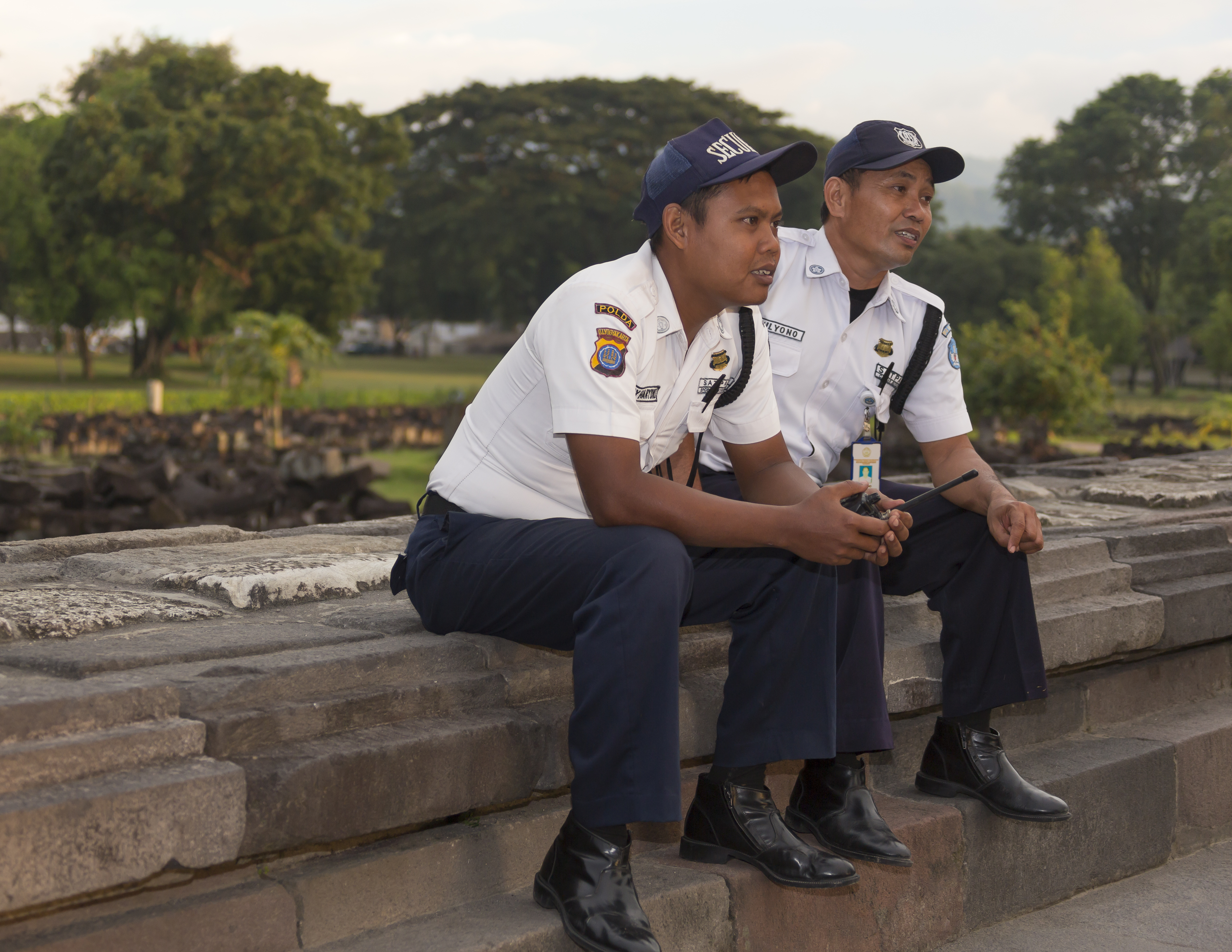
Security guards in Prambanan Temple, Central Java, Indonesia

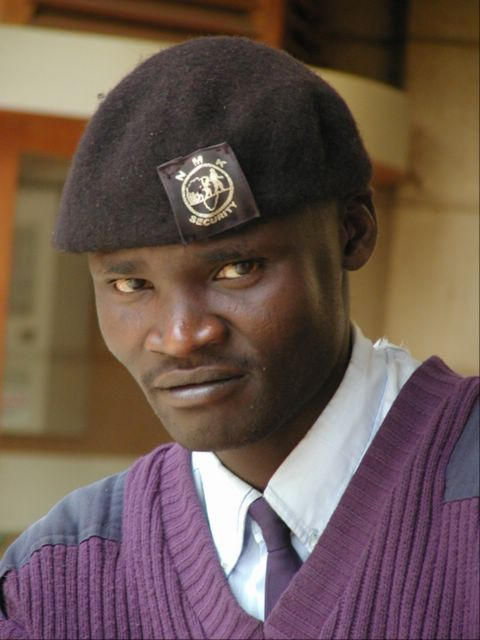
A Kenyan private security guard

=== Australia ===
Any person who conducts business or is employed in a security-related field in Australia must be licensed. Each of Australia's six states and two territories has separate legislation that covers all security activities. Licensing management in each state or territory varies and is carried out by the Police, the Attorney General's Department, the Justice Department, or the Department of Consumer Affairs.

- New South Wales—(Police) Security Industry Act 1997 & Security Industry Regulation 2016
- Victoria—(Police) Private Security Act 2004
- Queensland—(Justice & Attorney-General) Security Providers Act 1993
- South Australia—(Consumer & Business Affairs) Security and Investigation Agents Act 1995
- Western Australia—(Police) Security & Related Activities (Control) Act 1996 & Security & Related Activities (Control) Regulations 1997
- Tasmania—(Police) *Security and Investigation Agents Act 2002
- Northern Territory—(Justice) Private Security Act & Private Security (Security Officer/Crowd Controller/Security Firms/Miscellaneous Matters) Regulations;
- Australian Capital Territory—(Regulatory Services) Security Industry Act 2003 & Security Industry Regulation 2003

All of this legislation was intended to enhance the integrity of the private security industry.

All persons licensed to perform security activities are required to undertake a course of professional development in nationally recognised associated streams. This has not always been the case, and the introduction of this requirement is expected to regulate educational standards and knowledge bases to ensure the job can be performed competently. Strict requirements are laid down as to the type of uniform and badge used by security companies. Uniforms or badges that may be confused with those of a police officer are prohibited. Also, the use of the titles 'Security Police' or 'Private Detective' is unacceptable. While the term "security guard" is used by companies, government bodies, and individuals, the term "security officer" is considered more appropriate. Bouncers use the title Crowd Controllers, and Store Detectives use the title Loss Prevention or Asset Protection Officers. Security Officers may carry firearms, handcuffs, or batons where their role requires it, and only when working and with the appropriate sub-class accreditation on their license.

==== Private security trends ====
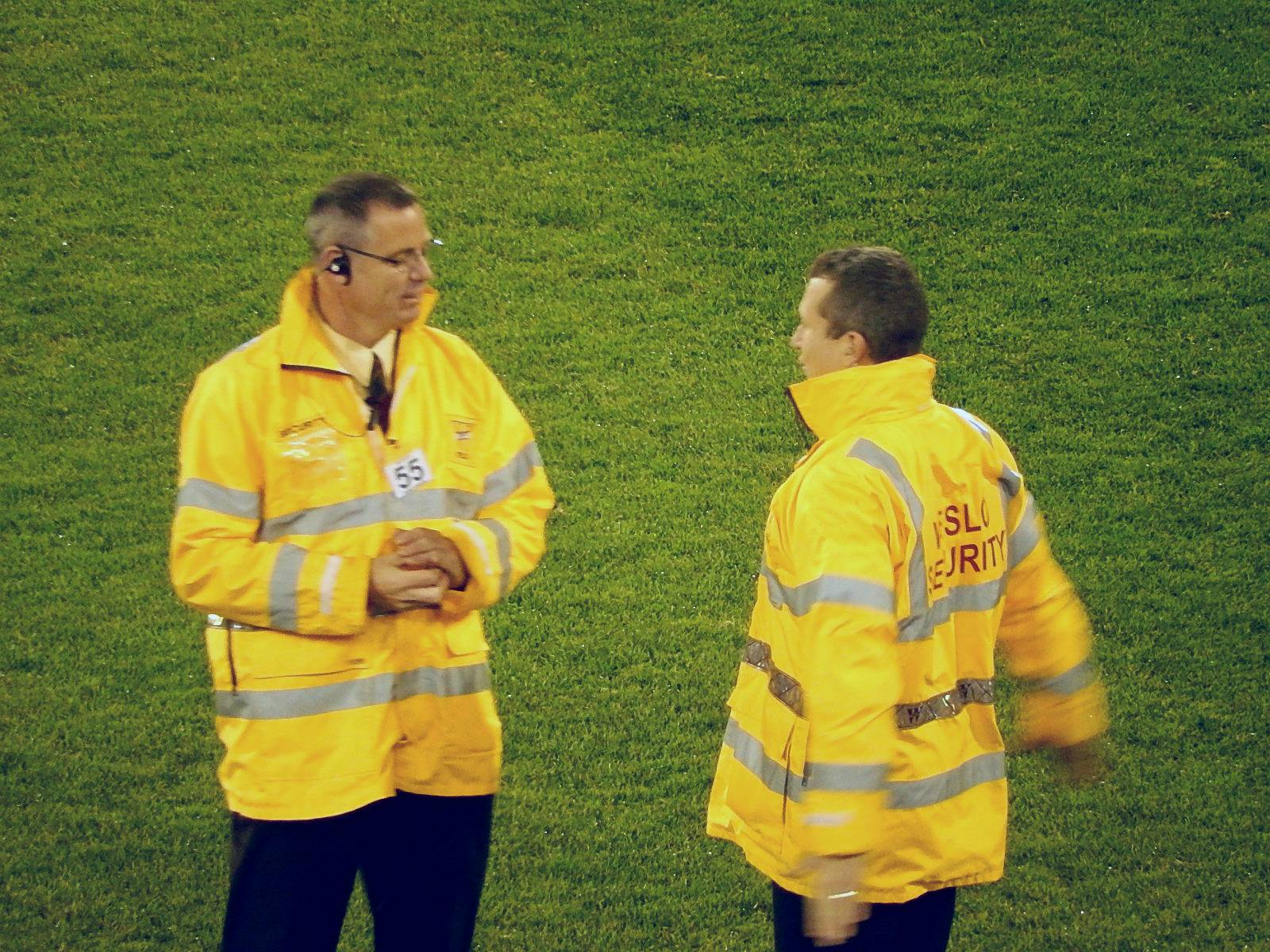
Security guards at an Australian rules football game

A 2009 review of trends in private security in Australia, conducted by Tim Prenzler, Karen Earle, and Rick Sarre, published by the Australian Institute of Criminology, sought to examine the size and scope of the private security industry in Australia to help inform efforts to develop nationally consistent standards and licensing regimes.

The review found the industry had a similar gender profile to police (24% female, 76% male); however, security had a wider age range – 35% of security officers were aged 45 to 64, while 44% of police were aged 30 to 39. The review noted that, as of 2009, private security outnumbered police two to one; it expected that this ratio would continue to decline as security technology became more readily accessible, especially CCTV camera systems, which are often seen as more cost-effective than guarding/mobile patrol services.

The review cited a 2007 report from IBISworld (2007:24) indicating that four out of five of the largest private security companies in Australia were foreign-owned, accounting for 44.5% of market share at the time.

A 2018 report authored by Anthony Bergin, Donald Williams, and Christopher Dixon and published by the Australian Strategic Policy Institute, focused on the current role of private security in countering hostile threats. An evolving understanding of threats has led private security to play a greater role in responding to critical incidents, such as terrorist attacks.

The report provided a low-end estimate of the total number of licensed security personnel across Australia as 120,000 (54,753 employed full-time, up from 52,768 in 2006). It said the security industry is nationally characterized as high-volume and high-turnover, given the conflict between a highly prescriptive selection process by employers and regulators who seek to ensure only fit and proper people are licensed. As such, approximately 47% of the industry consists of casual security officers.

In 2018, citing data from ASIAL, the report states that the private security industry has an annual turnover of AUD8 billion, split evenly between the workforce and the electronics sector. Despite various companies being amalgamated or split up, there remains a high level of foreign ownership among major security providers; however, the industry overall remains split between a small number of national companies and a large number of small, specialized businesses.

Technological advancements regarding drones, facial recognition, and robotics are expected to continue to augment the private security landscape in Australia.

=== Canada ===
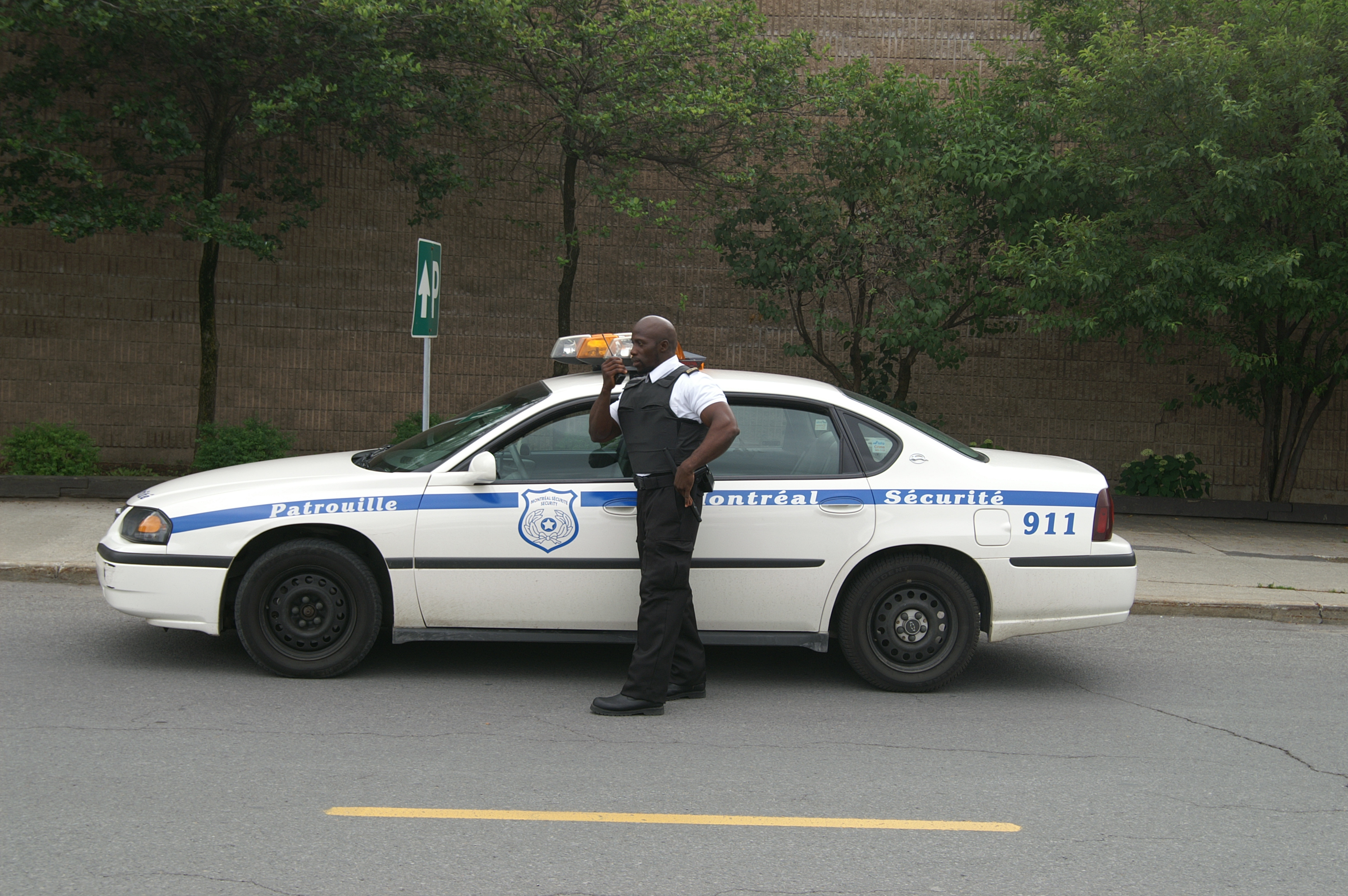
Security vehicle and officer in Montreal, Quebec

In Canada, private security falls under the jurisdiction of the country's 10 provinces and 3 territories. All ten of Canada's provinces and one of its territories (the Yukon) have legislation that regulates the contract security industry. These eleven jurisdictions require that companies that provide security guard services and their employees be licensed. Most provinces in Canada regulate the use of handcuffs and weapons (such as firearms and batons) by contract security companies and their employees, either banning such use completely or permitting it only under certain circumstances. Additionally, in some provinces, certain terms, or variations thereof, are prohibited either uniformly or in self-reference.

Canada's federal laws also restrict security officers' ability to be armed. For example, section 17 of the Firearms Act makes it an offense for any person, including a security officer, to possess prohibited or restricted firearms (i.e., handguns) anywhere outside of their home. There are two exceptions to this prohibition found in sections 18 and 19 of the Act. Section 18 deals with transportation of firearms while Section 19 deals with allowing persons to carry such firearms on their persons to protect their lives or the lives of other persons, or for the performance of their occupation (Armour Car Guards, Licensed Trappers), provided an Authorization to Carry (ATC) is first obtained.

==== British Columbia ====
Private security in the province of British Columbia is governed by two pieces of legislation: the Security Services Act and the Security Services Regulation. These laws are administered and enforced by the Security Programs and Police Technology Division of the Ministry of Public Safety and Solicitor General. The legislation requires that guards must be at least 19 years old, undergo a criminal background check, and complete a training course. As far as weapons, British Columbia law severely restricts their use by security officers. Section 11(1)(c) of the Security Services Regulation prohibits security personnel from carrying or using any "item designed for debilitating or controlling a person or animal", which the government interprets to include all weapons. Additionally, section 11 prohibits private security personnel from using or carrying restraints, such as handcuffs, unless authorized by the government. However, as in other parts of Canada, armored car officers are permitted to carry firearms. In the past, only personnel employed by contract security companies were regulated in British Columbia. However, as of September 1, 2009, in-house security officers and private investigators came under the jurisdiction of the Security Services Act and Security Services Regulation. Bodyguards and bouncers, effective November 1, 2009, are also subject to these regulations.

=== Europe ===
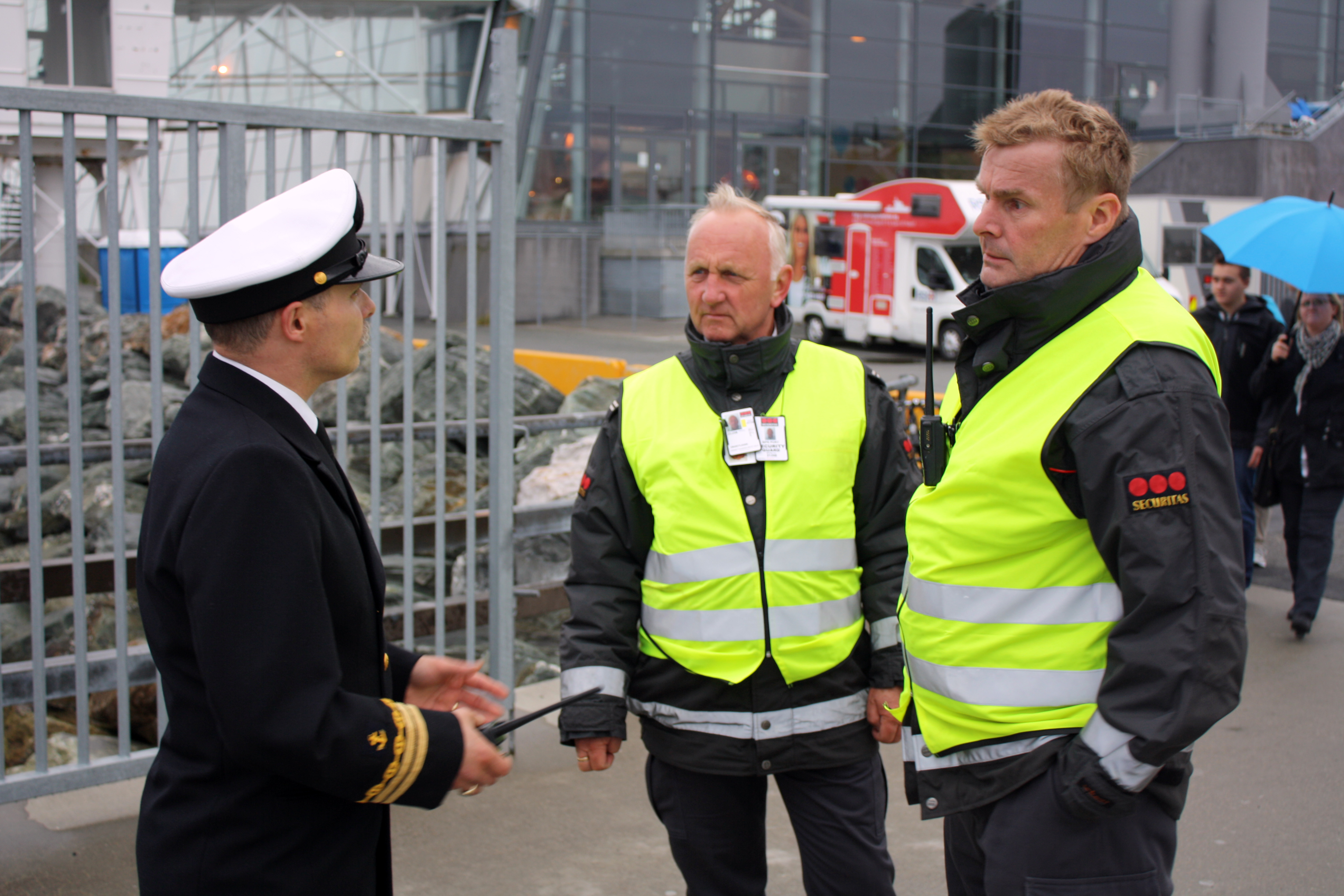
Securitas security officers in Norway

==== Finland ====
In Finland, all contract security officers (in Finnish vartija, in Swedish väktare) are required to have a valid license granted by the police. A temporary license is valid for 4 months, and a standard license is valid for 5 years. The license requires a minimum of 40 hours for a temporary license and an additional 80 hours for a normal license. Additionally, a narrow security vetting is required. The 40-hour course does not permit the guard to carry any special equipment, such as a baton or handcuffs. Guards have to complete the 80-hour course to carry these. Separate training and a license are required for the security guard to carry pepper spray, an extendable baton, or a firearm. Rehearsals on the use of weapons are mandatory every year and are regulated by the Ministry of the Interior to ensure the safe handling of pepper spray and similar equipment. Firearms can only be carried by bodyguards and cash-in-transit guards, or when guarding a person or object of public interest. In Finland, a security guard has the right to detain a person "red-handed", or seen committing a crime, and the right to search the detained individual for harmful items and weapons. An individual who has been forcefully detained can only be released by the police. All companies providing security guarding services are also required to have a valid license from the Ministry of the Interior.

==== France ====
In France, the Security Agents (agents de sécurité) are required to hold a professional card delivered by the Ministry of the Interior. The card is awarded after a 175-hour formation, which can be completed through specialized training (e.g., K9, firearms, maritime security, etc.). Former law enforcement and military personnel may request partial or full waivers for card delivery.

The Security Agent card is valid for 5 years, and renewal is subject to continuing education obligations.

==== Netherlands ====
In the Netherlands, security officers (beveiligingsbeambte) must undergo a criminal background check by the local police department in the area where the private security company is located. To become a security guard in the Netherlands, a person must complete the basic training level 2 Beveiliger2, which offers several specializations, such as Airport Security, Harbor Security, Object Security, and Mobile Surveillance. In addition, there are individual courses for specializations, such as Personal Security (Bodyguard), Private investigator, and Event Security Officer, for which the basic training Beveiliger 2 is not necessary. To complete the basic-level training, a trainee must complete a three-month internship with a private security company or a company that provides security services, licensed by the svpb, the board that oversees security exams. A trainee guard must pass for his diploma within one year. If the trainee does not pass, he is not allowed to work until he completes his training and passes. After a positive result, a new Security ID can be issued and is valid for 3 years; after that, the officer must undergo another background check by the local police to renew the ID.

Security officers in the Netherlands are not allowed to carry any weapons or handcuffs. Every uniformed security guard in the Netherlands must have the V symbol on their uniform to indicate that they are a private guard; the Ministry of Justice mandates this rule. Security uniforms may not resemble police uniforms and may not include any rank designation. The colors yellow and gold are not allowed because the Dutch police use gold accents in their uniforms; also, wearing a uniform cap is not allowed. The Ministry of Justice must approve every new uniform design or addition before it is used. A patrol vehicle may not look like a police striped vehicle. The only private security officers allowed to carry firearms are those who work for the military or the Dutch National Bank (De Nederlandsche Bank), which holds the national gold reserve. Security guards in the Netherlands can work for a specific security company or a security service within a company (Bedrijfsbeveiligingsdienst). Since 2018, the Security business in the Netherlands has seen a trend toward prioritizing hospitality in Security services.

==== Norway ====
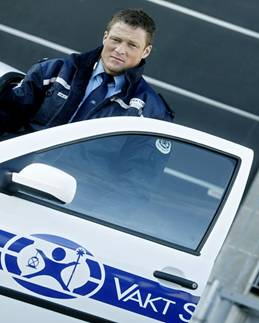
Security officer with vehicle in Norway

In Norway, security officers are called "Vektere". There are two different types of vektere—the normal uniformed or civil-clothing officers who watch over private and semi-public properties, and government-hired vektere who work in public places, such as the Parliament. The law grants security officers in Parliament greater enforcement powers than those of private security officers. Security officers must undergo five weeks of training and an internship. It is also possible to choose Security as a high school major, which requires two years of study and two years of trainee positions at private companies, resulting in a government-issued certificate. This certificate makes it easier to get a job and can lead to slightly higher pay. It also makes it easier to get a job elsewhere in the security industry. Private security officers can also obtain the certificate with a minimum of 5 years of work experience. No security officer may carry pepper spray, batons, or any other kind of weapon. However, handcuffs may be used. Norges Bank (Bank of Norway, Federal Reserve) had armed government guards until late 2013, when the Minister of Finance disarmed them. Security officers serving on ships sailing in areas of high piracy risk may be equipped with firearms. Uniforms should not resemble police-worn attire, but some do. The uniform must have the text 'VEKTER' or 'SIKKERHET' above the left shirt pocket.

A security officer, or any other person, may detain or arrest anyone who violates any law, as long as the violation carries a punishment of at least six months imprisonment and a fine. The detainee must be released or handed over to the authorities within four hours of the arrest. Security officers assigned to public transportation, such as trains, subways, trams, and buses, also have some powers under the Transportloven (transportation law). Security officers may issue fixed penalty tickets for violations of parking regulations in designated areas and for passengers on public transportation without a valid pass. A security officer may only search (frisk) a person to prevent the use of, or to confiscate, any weapon or anything that can be used as a weapon. In 2006, some security officers (Vakt Service/Nokas) were given extended training and limited police authority to transport prisoners between police holding cells, jails, and courts. Due to an outcry from the police union, this program was scrapped after a few months.

In addition to the normal "vektere," there is also a special branch for "Ordensvakter," who typically work as bouncers or security at concerts and similar events. Ordensvakter have to undergo an extra week of training to learn techniques on how to handle drunk people and people on various drugs. They also learn about the alcohol laws of Norway (which are rather strict). The local police district must approve each Ordensvakt. These special regulations arose after events in the 1990s when bouncers had a bad reputation, especially in Oslo, for being too brutal and rough with people. At that time, the police had no control over who worked as bouncers. Since the government implemented training and mandatory police-issued ID cards for bouncers, the problems have decreased. The Oslo police report that Ordensvakter are now helping identify crimes that would otherwise go unreported. In 2013, due to a high number of rapes and violent robberies, the city of Oslo (Oslo Kommune) hired a private security company (Metro Garda) to patrol the downtown immigrant areas. This patrol had a positive effect, and the city has, in addition to Metro Garda officers, now hired its own officers called Bymiljøetaten (City environment department). The municipalities in Norway are not allowed to form their own "police". The only police force in Norway is the national police (politiet).

In 2007, several officers from the Securitas AB company were arrested for brutality against a robber they apprehended on the main street of Oslo. The crime was captured on a mobile camera by pedestrians, sparking a public outcry, with many objecting to the way the security guards took the law into their own hands. Later, it came to light that the thief had first attacked the security guards when they approached him, so the brutality charges were dropped. As a result of this episode, the police said that they would be more careful when conducting criminal background checks for security guards. Before 2007, security guards were checked when they applied for a job, but not while they were working. Security companies were also criticized for failing to check criminal records sufficiently, in some cases not at all. Now guards working in private security must be checked annually. The police have the authority to withdraw a company's license if the company fails to submit employee lists to the police. The police in Norway were widely criticized for failing to check guards properly, and even when they encounter an issue with a guard, the guard can still work for months before anything is done. The security company G4S, after being criticized by police for hiring criminals, stated that it cannot do anything about the problem because only the police can check the guards' criminal records.

In 2012, Norwegian media reported that off-duty police officers and Home Guard soldiers had contracts of armed employment on civilian ships in Aden Bay, and police leaders were planning sanctions against the use of police officers. Today around 15,000 people are working in private security in Norway. The police have around 10,000 employees in total.

Notable companies:

- G4S
- Infratek
- ISS A/S (formerly Personellsikring)
- NOKAS
- Securitas

==== United Kingdom ====
SIA licence

Under the Private Security Industry Act 2001, the UK requires all contract security officers to hold a valid Security Industry Authority licence. The license must be displayed when on duty. However, a dispensation may be granted to store detectives, bodyguards, and others who need to operate without being identified as security guards. (This dispensation is not available to vehicle immobilizers.)

Licences are valid for three years and require the holders to undergo formal training and pass mandatory Criminal Records Bureau checks. Licences for vehicle immobilisers are valid for one year.

Non SIA licence

Some people working as 'in-house' security guards/officers do not need an SIA licence. 'In-house' means they are directly employed by the company/people they protect, such as supermarkets, rather than working for a security company.

There are two exceptions to this about 'in-house' guards:

- door supervision at a licensed premises
- vehicle immobilising – this only applies in Northern Ireland.

Both of these need SIA licences.

Unarmed Guarding

Armed guarding and guarding with a weapon are illegal in the United Kingdom, as almost all citizens are prohibited from carrying most firearms (such as a pistol), or offensive weapons (such as a baton).

The banned list includes:

- batons,
- incapacitant spray (pepper spray, OC spray)
- firearms,
- Tasers, stun guns.

However, guards may carry handcuffs and leg/arm restraints (although this is rare as the grounds for using them are narrow),> and some may wear stab-resistant vests (such as cash-in-transit guards).

=== Hong Kong ===
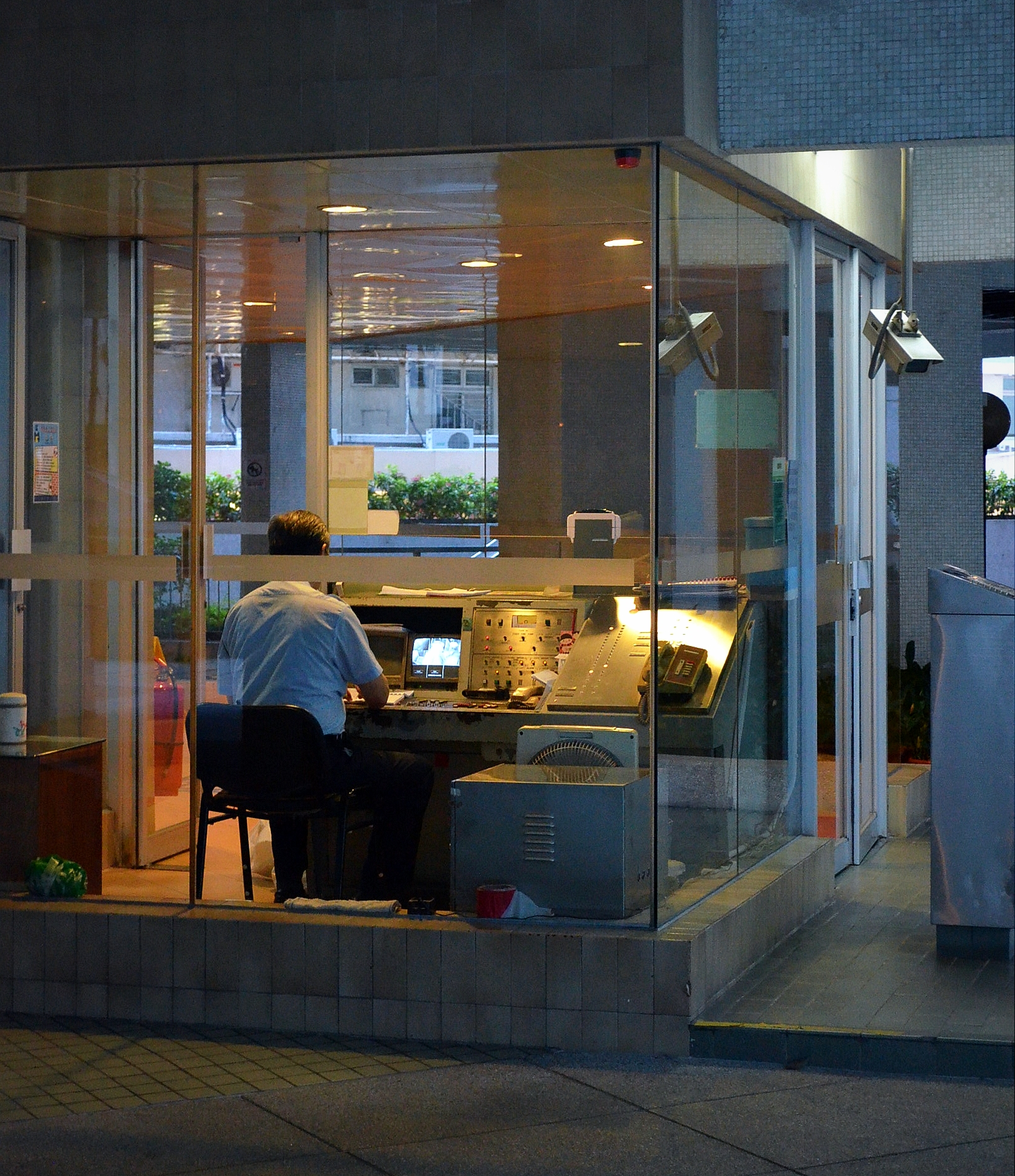
Watchman on duty at a residential block in Hong Kong

In Hong Kong, the term Security Officer refers to a senior staff member who supervises a team of security personnel. The staff who work under the supervision of security officers are called security guards.

==== Legislation ====
Before 1 October 1996, private security personnel were regulated by the Watchmen Ordinance (Chapter 299). However, there were many problems with that regulatory system—for example, there were no restrictions on who could establish private security companies to provide security services to clients. Also, there was no regulation of people who may install security systems. Some employers hired "caretakers" instead of security guards to avoid their responsibilities under the ordinance (by definition, "caretakers" are supposed to provide facilities management services, although security services provided to residential properties include some aspects of facilities management). As a result, the Hong Kong Government enacted a new law, the Security and Guarding Services Ordinance (Chapter 460), to replace the Watchmen Ordinance.

According to the Security and Guarding Services Ordinance: No individual shall do, agree to do, or hold himself/herself out as doing, or as available to do, security work for another person unless he/she does so-

- Under and in accordance with a permit; or
- Other than for reward.

Security work means any of the following activities-

- Guarding any property;
- Guarding any person or place for the purpose of preventing or detecting the occurrence of any offence; (Replaced 25 of 2000 s. 2)
- Installing, maintaining, or repairing a security device;
- Designing for any particular premises or place, a system incorporating a security device.

Security device means a device designed or adapted to be installed in any premises or place, except on or in a vehicle, for the purpose of detecting or recording- (Amended 25 of 2000 s. 2)

- The occurrence of any offence; or
- The presence of an intruder or of an object that persons are, for reasons of security, not permitted to bring onto the premises or place or any other premises or place.

=== Singapore ===
Security officers in Singapore are strictly regulated and overseen by the Singapore Police Force (SPF). Both domestic and international security companies operate in Singapore. There are certain requirements to meet to become a licensed security officer. These include, among others:

- Being at least 18 years old
- Passing a mandatory training program from a recognized training centre
- No criminal record

A security officer's license must be approved by the Police Licensing and Regulatory Department (PLRD), and is renewable every 5 years. Security officer ranks in Singapore are structured similarly to a police force. As of 2023, there are five standardized ranks, with promotion based on an officer's length of service and the number of mandatory training courses they have completed, as specified for each rank. These ranks also follow a progressive wage model.

- Security Officer (SO)
- Senior Security Officer (SSO)
- Security Supervisor (SS)
- Senior Security Supervisor (SSS)
- Chief Security Officer (CSO)

Higher ranks at the executive level also exist, with an academic degree often required for such positions. These ranks include:

- Security Executive (SE)
- Operations Manager (OM)
- Operations Executive (OE)

== Qualification ==
Qualifications for security guards vary from country to country. Certain requirements must be completed before applying for this job.

=== Hong Kong ===
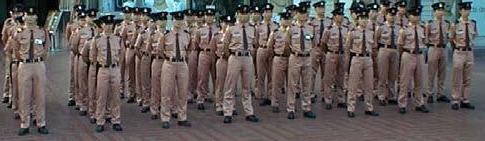
A group of security guards before going on duty in Hong Kong

Any applicant who wishes to apply for a Security Personnel Permit (SPP) must:

- They have been living in Hong Kong for at least 5 years. (This requirement may have been changed.)
- No criminal record.
- At least 17 years old when submitting their application.
- Have passed a mandatory 16-hour training course and have been granted a certificate for the course.
- If the applicant is over 65 years old, they must submit their health examination report.

==== Permit ====
Security Personnel Permit was separated into four types: A, B, C, and D.

- Type A permit holders are permitted to work in a "single-block" residential building; they are not allowed to carry firearms—no age limit.
- Type B permit holders are permitted to work in any property, but they are also not allowed to carry firearms. The maximum age limit of this permit is 70.
- Type C permit holder was permitted to work as an armed guard. (Usually, they are members of the cash transport car crew.) The maximum age limit of this permit is 55.
- Type D permit holder was permitted to design, install, and repair security devices—no maximum age limit.

The permit is valid for five years. All holders must renew their permit before it expires, or they will lose their right to work until it is renewed.

The Type A and Type B security services are gradually being combined with property management services, though the boundary between these two industries remains unclear.

==== Power of arrest ====
Security Guards in Hong Kong do not have special powers of arrest beyond those of an ordinary citizen, i.e., citizen's arrest, also known locally as the "101 arrest power". Section 101 of the Criminal Procedure Ordinance states that a private citizen may arrest an offender in certain circumstances if the offender is attempting an arrestable offense. Once arrested, the suspect must be delivered to a police station as soon as possible. An arrestable offense is defined as any crime carrying a sentence of more than 12 months' imprisonment. Security personnel are not allowed to search other people or obtain their personal information, except in specific circumstances.

=== Israel ===
In Israel, almost all security guards carry a firearm, primarily to prevent terror attacks. The vast majority of them are Ex-military. Security guards are common: they perform entrance checks at shopping malls, transportation terminals, government and other office buildings, and many stores. Many locations with high visitor volumes, such as the Jerusalem Central Bus Station, use X-ray machines to screen passengers' bags; in other places, bags are opened and visually inspected. Since 2009, private security guard companies, such as Mikud, have also replaced official security forces at some checkpoints inside the West Bank and on its border, as well as at crossings to the Gaza Strip.

Security guards must complete mandatory training and hold a valid certificate to work, and must show this certificate when using their powers, such as searching an individual or requiring ID. This training is conducted by private, specially licensed institutions and supervised by the Israel Police or, less commonly, by Shin Bet. If armed, they must, like all other citizens, carry a firearm license. The company employing the guard must also hold a permit, and, if the guard is armed, a special general permit to store and use firearms.

==== Powers ====
- Search and seizure - searching an individual and their belongings, and confiscation of illegal goods.
- Access control - stop an individual from entering or eject them, including the use of force.
- ID - the right to demand an ID and use reasonable force if none is forthcoming.
- Detainment - similar to a citizen's arrest, the guard may detain an individual and must transfer them to police custody.

=== Malaysia ===
Security officers at KK Times Square in Kota Kinabalu.

The private security industry is regulated by the Ministry of Home Affairs (Kementerian Dalam Negeri). As of 2018, all private security companies in Malaysia must have a minimum of 80% of their employees complete a Certified Security Guard Training Course to receive approval to renew their Private Agency License. Peninsular Malaysia allows the use of Nepalese security guards, whereas East Malaysian immigration policy does not permit the employment of foreign workers in the security industry.

=== South Africa ===
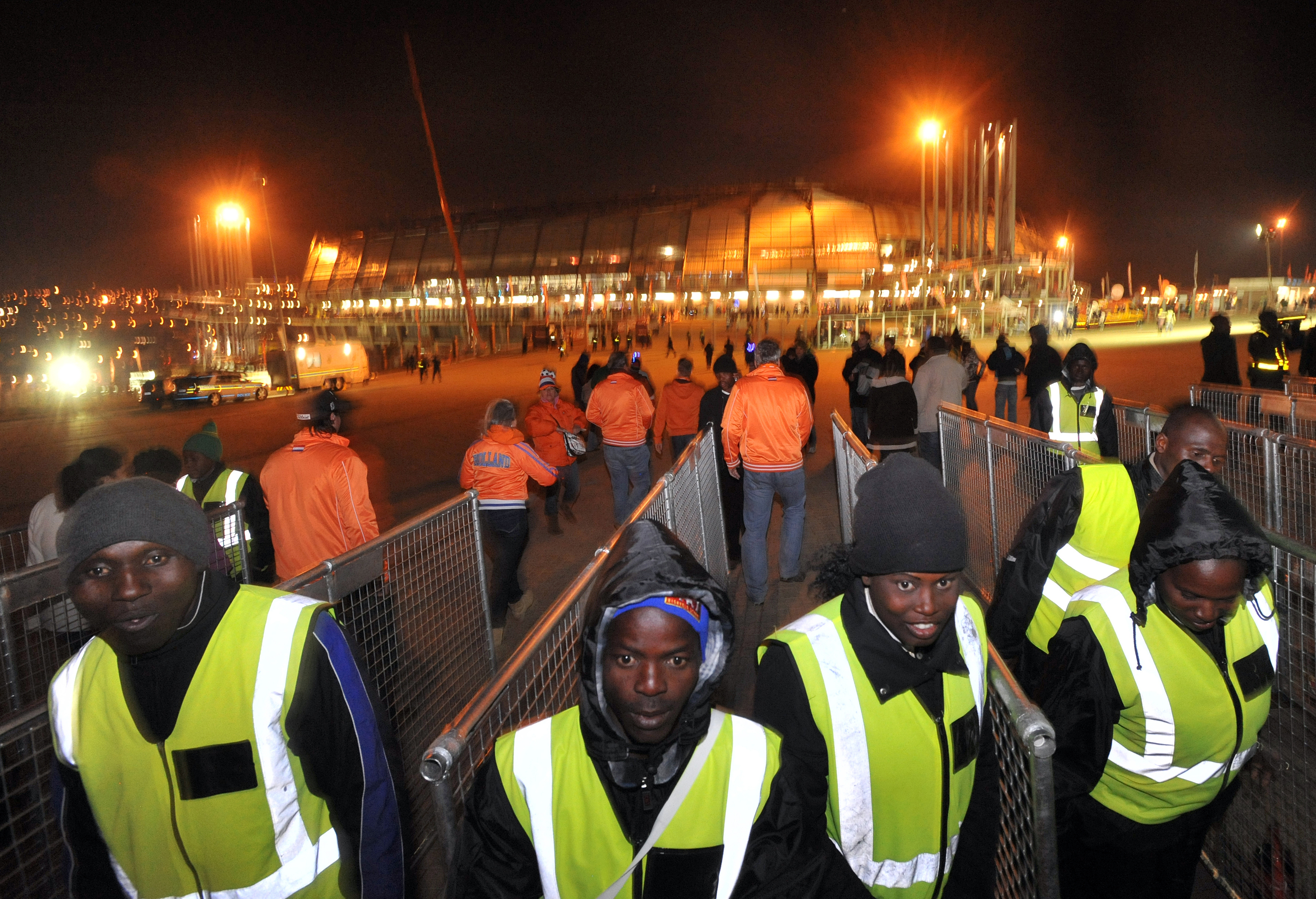
Private security workers in Johannesburg during the 2010 World Cup.

Security guards, along with the rest of the private security industry, are regulated under Act 56 of 2001, Private Security Industry Regulation Act.

=== United States ===
Private security guards have outnumbered police officers since the 1980s, predating the heightened concern about security brought on by the September 11 attacks of 2001. The more than 1 million contract security officers, and an equal number of guards estimated to work directly for U.S. corporations, is much greater than the nearly 700,000 sworn law enforcement officers in the United States. Most states require a license to work as a security officer. This license may include a criminal background check or mandated training requirements. Security guards have the same powers of arrest as a private citizen, called a "private person" arrest, "any person" arrest, or "citizen's arrest". If weapons are carried, additional permits and training are usually required. Armed security personnel are generally employed to protect sensitive sites, including government and military installations, armored money transports, casinos, banks and other financial institutions, and nuclear power plants. However, armed security is quickly becoming a standard for vehicle patrol officers and on many other non-government sites.

The responsibilities of security guards in the United States are expanding in scope. For example, a trend is the increasing use of private security to support services previously provided by police departments. James F. Pastor addresses substantive legal and public policy issues that directly or indirectly relate to the provision of security services. The logic of alternative or supplemental service providers can demonstrate these. The use of private police has particular appeal because property or business owners can directly contract for public safety services, thereby providing welcome relief for municipal budgets. Finally, private police functions can be flexible, depending on the client's financial, organizational, political, and other circumstances.

Arizona – Licensed security companies are required to provide eight hours of pre-assignment training to all persons employed as security guards before the employee acts in the capacity of a security guard. There is a state-mandated curriculum that must be taught, and subjects covered must include criminal law and laws of arrest, uniforms and grooming, communications, use of force, general security procedures, crime scene preservation, ethics, and first response.

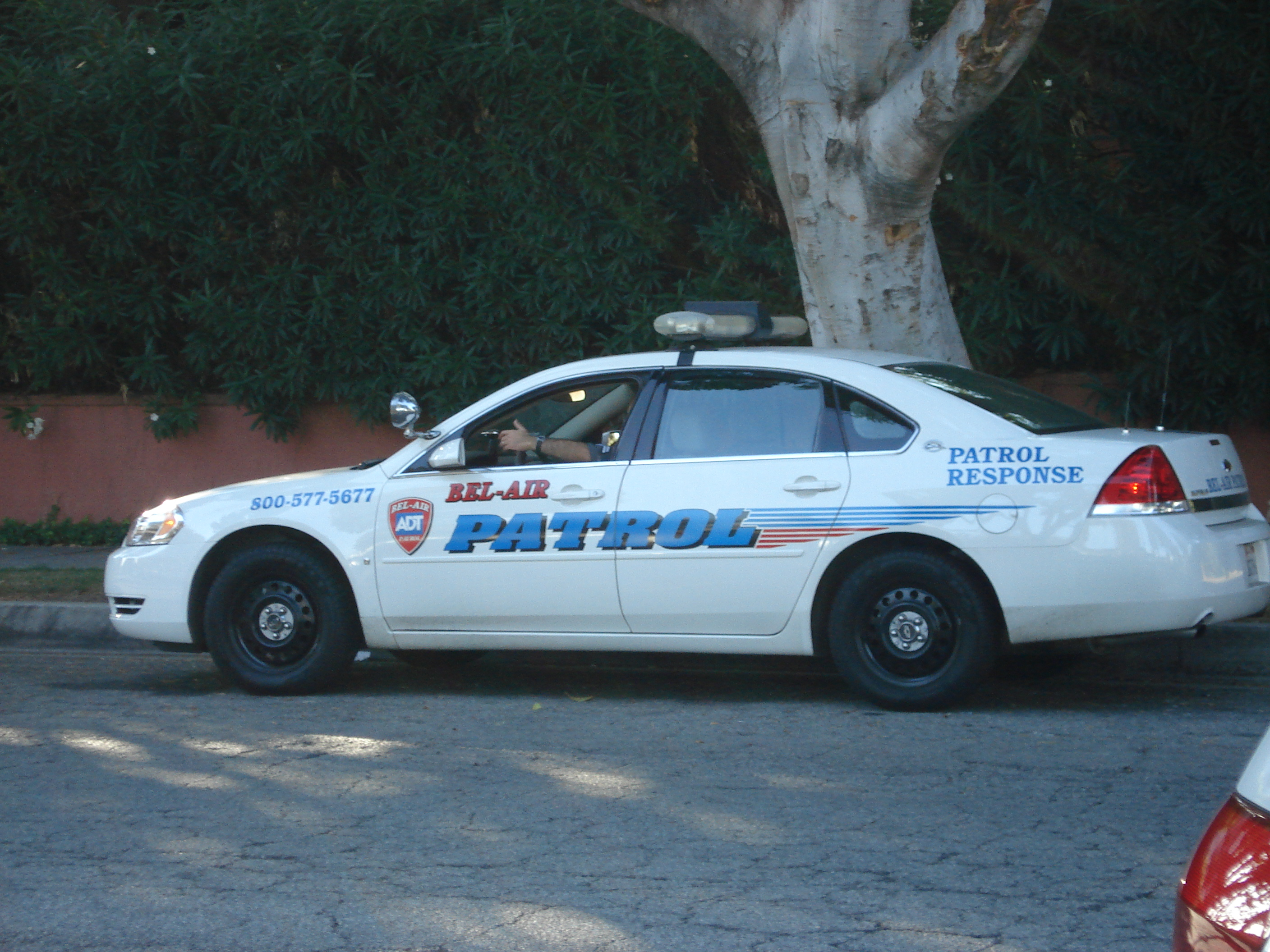
An ADT Bel-Air Patrol vehicle

California – Security Guards must obtain a license from the Bureau of Security and Investigative Services (BSIS) within the California Department of Consumer Affairs. Applicants must be at least 18 years old, undergo a criminal history background check through the California Department of Justice (DOJ) and the Federal Bureau of Investigation (FBI), and complete a 40-hour course of required training. This required training is broken down into smaller training sections and timelines. The first is 8 hours of BSIS-designed instruction on powers to arrest and appropriate use of force. The certificate is required as a prerequisite for applying for an individual officer's license (guard card). Then, within 30 days of obtaining the individual officer's license, they must complete 16 hours of training in various mandatory and elective courses. Finally, within 6 months of obtaining their license, they must complete an additional 16 hours of training in various mandatory and elective courses. California security officers are also required to complete 8 hours of BSIS-approved annual renewal training on security-related topics. The training and exam may be administered by any private patrol operator or by any of the many certified training facilities. This training can be in the classroom or online.

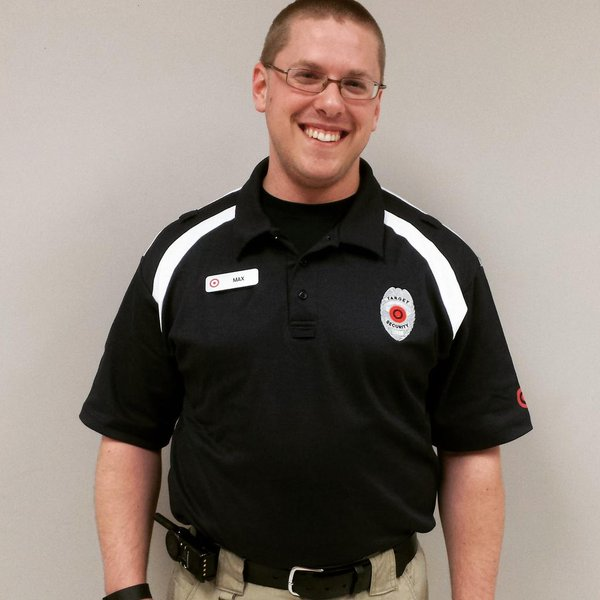
A loss prevention security officer for Target. Loss prevention or asset protection officers are security officers specially tasked with preventing shoplifting and arresting offenders.

The individual officer's license in California expires every two years and is subject to renewal.

Illinois – Security Guards / Security Officers in Illinois are required to have a valid Permanent Employee Registration Card, also known as a PERC Card for short. They also must be at least 18 years old to work as an unarmed security guard and at least 21 years old to work as an armed security guard. A valid Firearm Owner's Identification Card (FOID Card) is also required for those working as armed security guards.

New Jersey – As of 2006, all security personnel employed by a "security officer company" that provides security services to other entities by contract must undergo a state-mandated certified training program. This law, commonly referred to as SORA, is the state's effort to increase the quality of security personnel. Security personnel employed by other types of businesses do not require the SORA certification card. However, employees of Atlantic City casinos are required to have a state-issued "Casino Employee Registration" card.

New Mexico – As of 2008, all security guards must undergo FBI background checks and a certified training program. Guards who carry firearms must also undergo additional training with a firearm through an approved firearms instructor and pass a psychological exam. The security industry is regulated through the New Mexico Regulation and Licensing Division.

New Orleans, Louisiana – The City of New Orleans Department of Police in accordance with New Orleans Home Rule Charter section 4-502 (2) (a) (b) and New Orleans Municipal Code 17-271 MCS 90-86, deputizes armed Security Officers, Private Investigators, College Campus Police, City, State, and Federal agencies, within the city limits, with limited Police Power as New Orleans Police Special Officers. New Orleans Municipal Code 17-271 MCS 30-1122 states It shall be unlawful for any person to act as an armed guard unless he is a Peace Officer. Louisiana R.S. 40:1379.1 (b) states that the Special Officer, when performing those tasks requiring a Special Officer's commission, shall have the same powers and duties as a Peace Officer. Special Officers may make an arrest for felony or misdemeanor offenses on the property or area they are to protect, patrol, or in relation to their direct assignment. The Special Officer, when making an arrest, may pat down the arrested subject for weapons. Special Officers are to turn over arrested subjects and pertinent evidence to a New Orleans Police Officer. Special Officers are to honor all subpoenas on arrest made and appear in court to testify. Special Officers, when not on a particular assignment, are regarded as private citizens and have no Police Power. However, Special Officers may still arrest for a felony, whether in or out of their presence, while not on a particular assignment, under Louisiana Law CCRP art. 214, Arrest by private person; when lawful.

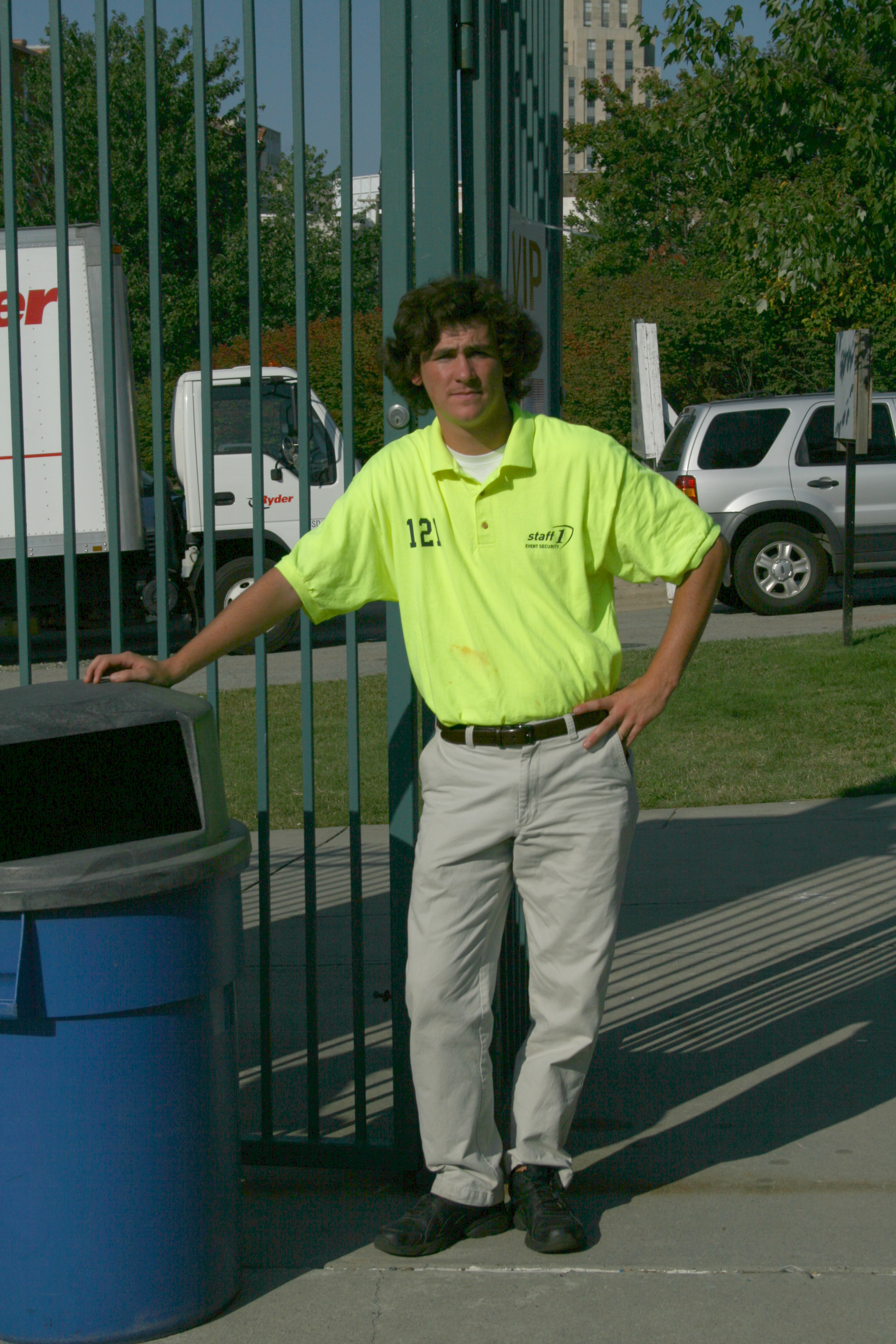
Security guard at the 13th Annual World Beer Festival in Durham, North Carolina

North Carolina – Security Officers in North Carolina are required to register and become certified with the Private Protective Services Board (PPSB), the private security authority body under the North Carolina Department of Justice. The purpose of the Private Protective Services Board is to administer the licensing, education, and training requirements for persons, firms, associations, and corporations engaged in private protective services within North Carolina. The board is fully fee-funded, staffed by departmental employees, and directed daily by the Director, who the Attorney General appoints. There are two classifications of officers: armed and unarmed. While an unarmed officer is required to complete a 16-hour training and instruction class to become certified, an armed officer must complete additional hours of classroom training and qualify on a gun range with the firearm they will carry on duty.

Oklahoma – Security officers in Oklahoma are licensed by CLEET (Council on Law Enforcement Education and Training). To be licensed as an unarmed officer, an individual must be at least 18 years of age, complete 40 hours of classroom training, and pass criminal history checks. Armed guards must be 21 years of age, complete an additional 40 hours of classroom training, qualify with their firearm, and pass a psychological evaluation.

Oregon – Security officers in Oregon must be licensed as either an unarmed, armed, or event security professional by the Department of Public Safety, Standards, and Training to be employed for the purpose of providing security services. Unarmed and event professionals must be at least 18 years of age, and armed professionals must be at least 21. All security professionals are required to complete classroom instruction, and armed professionals must also complete a basic marksmanship course. Supervisors and managers have an additional certification completed through classroom training. Loss prevention officers are required to have an unarmed or armed certification.

Pennsylvania – No licensing requirements to be an unarmed security guard. However, anyone who carries a firearm or other "lethal weapon" in the course and scope of their employment must be trained as a "Certified Agent" and complete a 40-hour training course (including shooting range time) to be certified to carry weapons while on duty under the Lethal Weapons Training Act (commonly referred to as Act 235 certification). Certification involves completing a medical physical exam, a psychological examination, classroom training, and qualifying on a pistol range, with firing of 50 rounds of ammo larger than a .380acp. Agents are also required to qualify with a shotgun. The certification is valid for five years; at that time, an eight-hour refresher course must be completed, or the certification is revoked.

South Carolina – All Security Officers have the same authority and power of arrest as Sheriff's Deputies, while on the property they are paid to protect, and according to Attorney General Alan Wilson, are considered Law Enforcement for the purpose of making arrests and swearing out a warrant before the magistrate. Private Officers may respond to calls for service, make arrests, and use blue lights and traffic radar. They may also be specially authorized by the State Law Enforcement Division (SLED) to issue Uniform Traffic Tickets to violators. Security Officers are licensed or registered (as appropriate) by SLED for one year at a time. Training for unarmed officers is 8 hours, and an additional 8 hours is required for a security weapons permit or a concealed security weapons permit. Additional hours must be documented for officers issuing public or private tickets, as well as for officers who will be using batons, pepper spray, or tasers.

St. Louis, Missouri – Security officers are required to be licensed by the St. Louis County Police Department or St. Louis Police Department. St. Louis County security officer training is a two-day class and a yearly renewal class. Armed officers must shoot biannually to keep their armed status. The county license is called a Metropolitan License, meaning it is good for St. Louis City and County. The St. Louis City website has all the information regarding licensing requirements, as they are the same in the city and county.

Texas – There are three types of Security Officer license types in the state of Texas. Each requires a certain level of training. All training and licensing is regulated by the Department of Public Safety's Private Security Bureau. The three types of licenses are

Non-Commissioned Security Officer (Level II)
An unarmed officer who must wear a distinctive DPS-approved uniform. The main purpose of this type of officer is the phrase most associated with security, Observe and Report. The Security Officer is generally there to be a good witness.

- Required Training: Level II/Non-Commissioned Officer requires 6 hours of classroom-based training. This course may be taught by any licensed company directly to new hires. The Owner, Qualified Manager, or a designee of the Qualified Manager may teach the course. After the course, the candidate must pass a multiple-choice exam. There are no prerequisites to this course or license.
- Background Check: FBI background check and electronic fingerprint imaging
- Renewal: Submission of renewal fee every two years. No required renewal course.

Commissioned Security Officer (Level III)

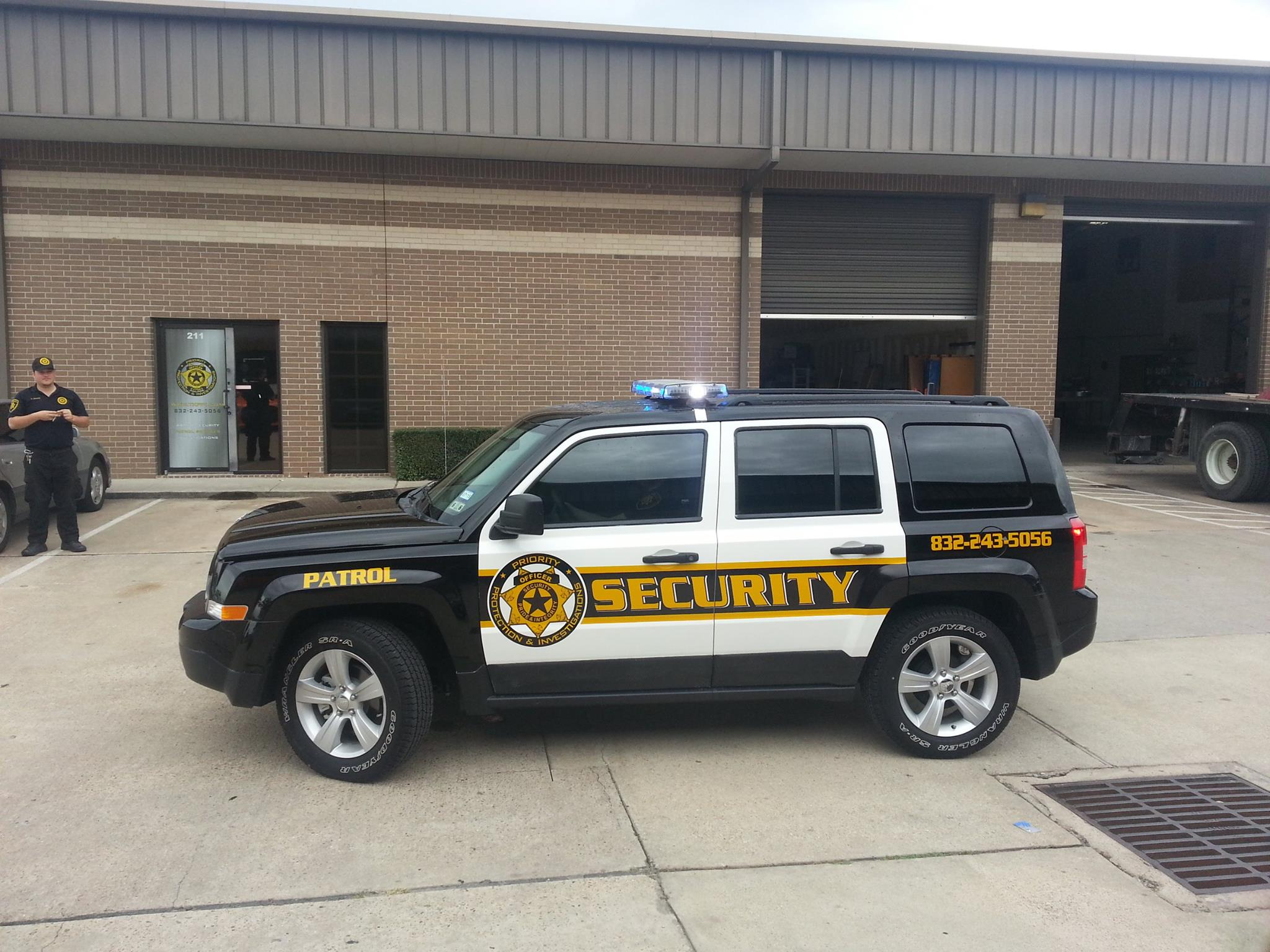
A patrol vehicle used by Priority Protection & Investigations in Texas

A Commissioned Security Officer openly carries a handgun and may also carry a baton, chemical dispensing device (OC), Taser, etc. Commissioned Officers also must wear a distinct DPS-approved uniform and can at no time conceal their weapon while on duty and/or in uniform. The main purpose of this type of officer is to prevent and deter crime actively. Observe and report is now a secondary function, and the officer is to actively protect clients and property in accordance with the client's procedures and state and federal law.

- Required Training: Level III/Commissioned Officer requires a 40-hour Level III course. The training for this license consists of classroom-based learning, defense tactics, handcuffing, and firearms training. After the course, the candidate must pass a firearms proficiency test and a multiple-choice exam. This license requires completion of the previous Level II course. This course may only be taught by a licensed Level III instructor working under a state-licensed Level III security training school.
- Background Check: FBI background check and electronic fingerprint imaging
- Renewal: Submission of renewal fee and proof of completion of a 6-hour re-qualification class taught by a Level III instructor under a Level III training school. The re-qualification course requires completion of a multiple-choice exam and a firearms qualification. This is done every two years.

Personal Protection Officer (Level IV)
A Personal Protection Officer (PPO) directly protects their client's life. PPOs are the only license type able to wear plain clothes while working. PPOs in plain clothes MUST conceal their firearms, and they are the only license type allowed to do so. The Level IV/Personal Protection Officer license is tied to the Level III/Commissioned Officer license. To issue a PPO license, the PPO candidate must be applying for it at the same time or have already received a Level III/ Commissioned Security Officer license. The Security Officer's Level III and IV will also share the same expiration date, regardless of the issue date.

- Required Training: Level IV/ Personal Protection Officer requires a 15-hour course teaching additional law, defense tactics, considerations for personal protection of a client, and OC training. This license requires completion of the previous Level II and Level III courses. This course may only be taught by a licensed Level IV instructor working under a state-licensed Level IV security training school.
- Background Check: FBI background check and electronic fingerprint imaging
- Psychological Testing: In addition to the training and background check, a PPO must also submit an MMPI (psychological test) administered by a Texas-licensed psychologist.
- Renewal: Submission of renewal fee and a current Level III/ Commissioned Officer license or pending renewal of Level III/Commissioned Officer license.

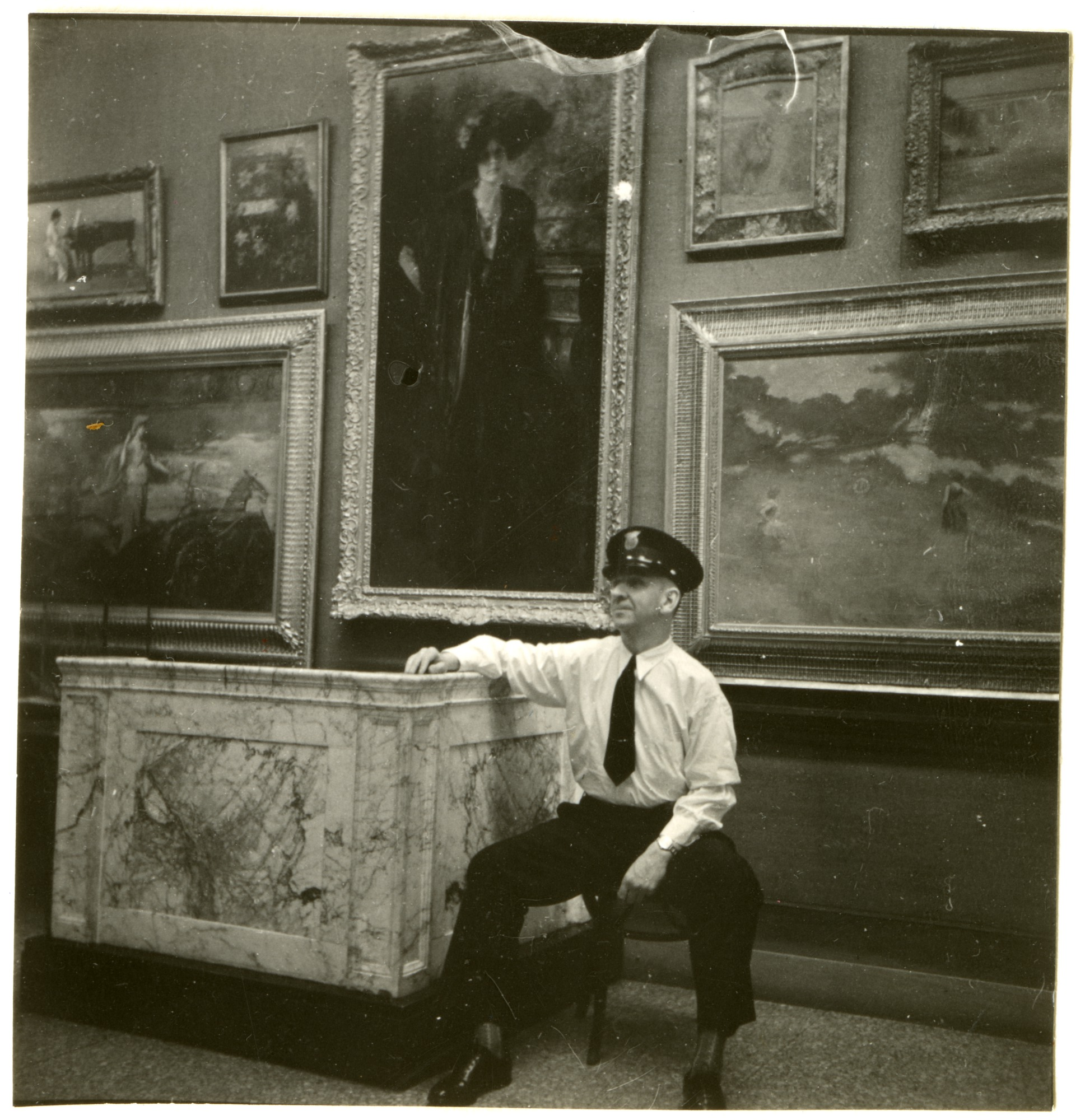
A museum guard in 1935

Virginia – Since the 1980s, Security Officers in Virginia are required to be certified by DCJS (Department of Criminal Justice Services, the same agency that certifies law enforcement officers). To be certified as an unarmed security officer one must go through 18 hours of classroom training from a certified instructor to obtain this card. It must be done by the end of their 90 days after hire with a Security company. Every 2 years, the card must be renewed by completing an in-service training session with a certified instructor. To be certified as an armed security officer, one must complete an additional 24 hours of firearms training, 8 hours of training in conducting a lawful arrest, and qualification with the type and caliber of weapon they intend to carry. Firearms endorsements must be renewed annually by completing an in-service and passing a firearms qualification. Certified armed security officers are authorized under state code to arrest for any offense committed in their presence while they are on duty at the location they are hired to protect. Unarmed officers have no arrest powers. They are also granted the authority by the state law to issue a summons to appear in court for felonies and misdemeanors. Virginia also allows security officers to complete an additional 40 hours of training to become certified as Conservators of the Peace (Special Police) for their employing company. This appointment is made by a Circuit Court Judge, under which the officer is sworn in and has the powers of a police officer on the property they are working, as well as the lawful duty to act upon witnessing any felony and the ability to pursue fleeing felons. Such sworn officers are also permitted the use of sirens and red lights. Those who handle K-9s, work as dispatchers, alarm responders, private investigators, instructors, bounty hunters, armored car couriers, and Executive Protection Specialists are regulated by DCJS, which also regulates other categories of training with additional training requirements. All positions require State Police and FBI background checks.

=== Australia ===
In Australia, regulations and restrictions on the private security industry vary by state. In the state of Victoria, individuals employed in the private security industry, or wishing to be employed in the industry, must hold a valid 'Private security licence' that qualifies them and outlines the activities they are allowed to perform. Private security licenses in Victoria are issued and managed by Victoria Police Licensing and Regulation Division.

A list of activities applicable to a Victorian private security license include:

- Security Guard
- Crowd Controller
- Bodyguard
- Investigator

== Police ==
Security personnel are not police officers, unless they are security police. Security personnel derive their powers from state or provincial laws, which allow them to enter into a contractual arrangement with clients that gives them Agent of the Owner powers. This includes nearly unlimited power to question, absent the probable cause requirements that frequently dog public law enforcement officers. In essence, security officers keep private property/persons safe from hazards, whereas police officers protect entire communities by enforcing laws and arresting suspected offenders. Some jurisdictions do commission or deputize security officers and grant them limited additional powers, particularly when employed to protect public property, such as mass transit stations. This is a special case that is often unique to a particular jurisdiction or locale. Additionally, security officers may be called upon to act as agents of law enforcement if a police officer, sheriff's deputy, or similar official is in immediate need of assistance and has no backup available.

Some security officers do have reserve police powers and are typically employed directly by governmental agencies. Typically, these are sworn law enforcement personnel whose duties primarily involve the security of a government installation, and they are also a special case. Other local and state governments occasionally enter into special contracts with security agencies to provide patrol services in public areas. These personnel are sometimes referred to as "private police officers". Sometimes, police officers work as security personnel while not on duty. This is usually done for extra income, and work is particularly done in hazardous jobs such as bodyguard work and bouncers outside nightclubs. Police are called in when a situation warrants a higher degree of authority to act on reported observations that security does not have the authority to address. However, some states allow Licensed Security Officers full arrest powers equal to those of a Sheriff's Deputy.

In 1976, the Law Enforcement Assistance Administration's National Advisory Commission on Criminal Justice Standards and Goals reported:

One massive resource, filled with significant numbers of personnel, armed with a wide array of technology, and directed by professionals who have spent their entire adult lifetimes learning how to prevent and reduce crime, has not been tapped by governments in the fight against criminality. The private security industry, with over one million workers, sophisticated alarm systems and perimeter safeguards, armored trucks, sophisticated mini-computers, and thousands of highly skilled crime prevention experts, offers a potential for coping with crime that can not be equalled by any other remedy or approach.... Underutilized by police, all but ignored by prosecutors and the judiciary, and unknown to corrections officials, the private security professional may be the only person in this society who has the knowledge to prevent crime effectively.

In New York City, the Area Police/Private Security Liaison program was organized in 1986 by the NYPD commissioner and four former police chiefs working in the private security industry to promote mutual respect, cross-training, and sharing of crime-related information between public police and private security.

== Trends ==
=== Australia ===
In 2006, the Australian Bureau of Statistics Report showed that private security personnel outnumbered police, with 52,768 full-time security officers in the security industry compared to 44,898 police officers. However, since the Security Industry Regulation Act of 2007, it has dropped to less than half of that.

=== Bangladesh ===
A Bangladeshi security guard guarding a residential colony at night

In Bangladesh, private companies and residential authorities may assign security guards. The demand for event security is high. Most of the guards from renowned security companies receive on-the-ground training, are qualified in unarmed combat, use firearms, and manage emergencies. Use of firearms in security occupations depends on government discretion. In many cases, guards are only assigned for their physical strength and presence.

=== United Kingdom ===
The trend in the UK is one of polarization. Manned guarding, the security industry term for the security guards most people are familiar with, is diverging toward two opposite extremes: one typified by a highly trained and well-paid security officer, the other with security officers on or about minimum wage with only the minimum training required by law. Within the "in-house" sector, where security personnel are not subject to licensing under the Private Security Industry Act 2001, the same divergence can be seen, with some companies opting for in-house security to maintain control of their standards, while others use it as a route to cheaper, non-regulated security. In a very few cases, such as the Northern Ireland Security Guard Service, security guards may be attested as Special Constables.

=== United States ===
Economist Robert B. Reich, in his 1991 book The Work of Nations, stated that in the United States, the number of private security guards and officers was comparable to the number of publicly paid police officers. He used this phenomenon as an example of the general withdrawal of the affluent from existing communities where governments provide public services. Instead, the wealthy pay to provide their own premium services through voluntary, exclusive associations. As taxpayer resistance has limited government budgets and the demand for secure homes in gated communities has grown, these trends continued in the 1990s and 2000s. In the aftermath of the September 11, 2001 attacks, the trend in the US is one of a quiet transformation of the role of security guards into first responders in case of a terrorist attack or major disaster. This has resulted in longer guard instruction hours, extra training in terrorism tactics, and increased laws governing private security companies in some states.

== History ==
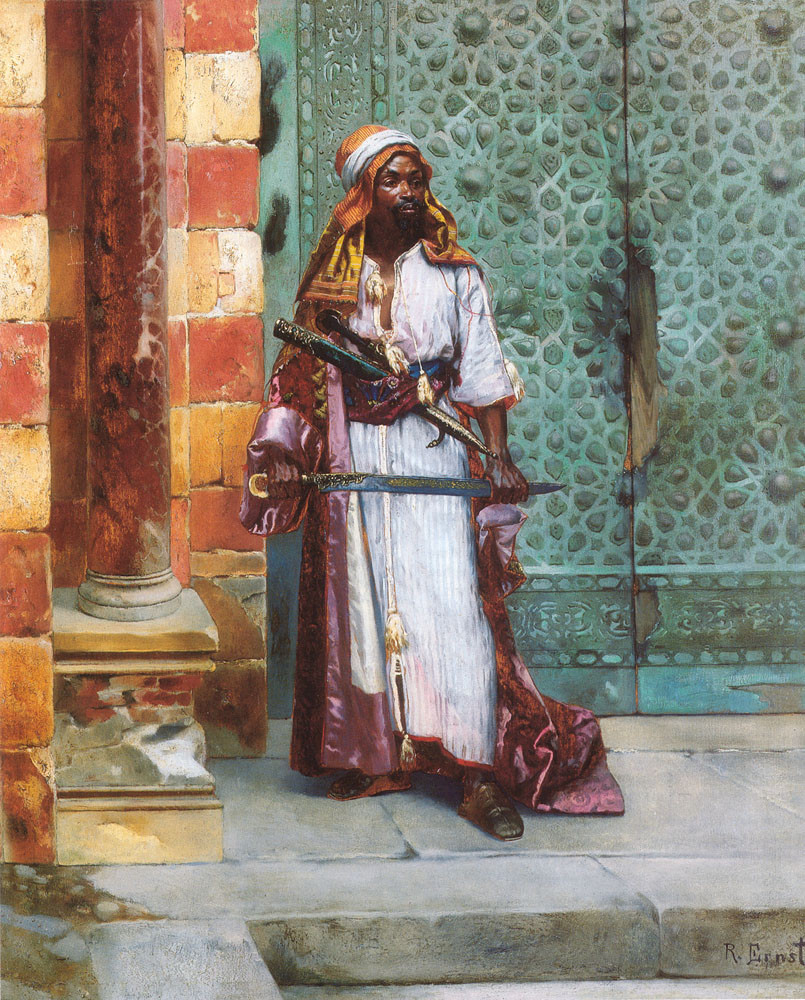
Standing Guard

The vigiles were soldiers assigned to guard the city of Rome, often credited as the origin of both security personnel and police. However, their principal duty was as a fire brigade. There have been night security guards in Europe since at least the Middle Ages; walled cities in ancient times also had security guards. A special chair appeared in Europe sometime in the late Middle Ages, called the watchman's chair; this unupholstered wooden chair had a forward slanting seat to prevent the watchman from dozing off during duty.

== Notable examples ==
- In June 1972, Frank Wills, a security guard at the Watergate office complex in Washington, D.C., noticed a piece of tape covering the latch on an entrance to one of the buildings, thereby preventing it from locking. Police, whom Wills subsequently notified, arrested five men in the portion of the building occupied by the Democratic National Committee (DNC) headquarters. The following investigations and revelations—made possible by Wills' discoveries and subsequent actions—ultimately led to the resignation of President Richard Nixon in what is now known as the Watergate scandal, considered one of the largest American political scandals.
- Christoph Meili, night guard at a Swiss bank, became a whistleblower in 1997. He told about the bank destroying records related to the funds of Holocaust victims, whose money the bank was supposed to return to the victims' heirs.
- In 1999, security guard Pierlucio Tinazzi died while attempting to rescue victims from the Mont Blanc tunnel fire.
- In 2001, Gary Coleman, former child actor, was employed as an armed security officer, with permits valid for both firearm and baton through the Bureau of Security and Investigative Services of California in the Los Angeles area. While shopping for a bullet-resistant vest for his job, Coleman assaulted a female autograph collector. Coleman said he felt "threatened by her insistence" and punched her in the head.
- Richard Jewell, a security officer at Atlanta, Georgia's Centennial Olympic Park during the 1996 Summer Olympics who was wrongly accused of the Centennial Olympic Park bombing. Jewell was later cleared of those charges and, in fact, was the one who saved hundreds of lives when he first noticed the suspicious package and ordered the area evacuated. Jewell later successfully sued several news agencies that erroneously reported he was the bomber.
- Joseph Trombino, a Brinks Security Officer who was shot and wounded in the 1981 Brink's robbery. Trombino survived his injuries and continued to work for the Brink's company for the next 20 years; he was almost killed in the 1993 World Trade Center bombing and was killed in the September 11, 2001 attacks while making a delivery in the World Trade Center North Tower.

== Unionization ==
=== Canada ===
Many security guards in Canada are unionized. The primary unions that represent security guards in Canada are the United Food and Commercial Workers (UFCW), Local 333, and the Canadian branch of the United Steelworkers (USW). In contrast to the legal restrictions in the United States, Canadian labour relations boards will certify bargaining units of security guards for a Canadian Labour Congress (CLC)-affiliated union, or for the same union as for other employee classifications.

=== Singapore ===
Security officers in Singapore are unionised under the Union of Security Employees (USE), an affiliate of the National Trades Union Congress (NTUC).

=== United States ===
In June 1947, the United States Congress passed the Taft–Hartley Act, placing many restrictions on labor unions. Section 9 (B) (3) of the act prevents the National Labor Relations Board (NLRB) from certifying for collective bargaining any unit that mixes security employees with non-security employees. This restricts security employees' ability to join any union that also represents other types of employees. They may be part of an independent "security-only" union, not affiliated with any coalition of other labor unions, such as the American Federation of Labor and Congress of Industrial Organizations (AFL-CIO). A union that also represents non-security employees may also represent and bargain on behalf of security employees with the employer's consent. Two of the largest security unions are the Security, Police, and Fire Professionals of America (SPFPA) and the United Government Security Officers of America (UGSOA), but the largest union of security officers is SEIU 32BJ, which as of 2018 had over 30,000 security officers.

==== Security, Police, and Fire Professionals of America ====
In 1948, with the Taft–Hartley restrictions well into effect, the Detroit, Michigan area security guards of United Auto Workers (UAW) Amalgamated Local 114 were forced to break away and start a separate "Plant Guards Organizing Committee". The NLRB ruled that as an affiliate of the CIO, the committee was indirectly affiliated with production unions and therefore ineligible for certification under the new restrictions. The committee was then forced to withdraw entirely from the CIO and form the independent United Plant Guard Workers of America. By the 1990s, this union had evolved to include many other types of security officers and changed its name to the SPFPA.

==== United Government Security Officers of America ====
In 1992, the UGSOA was formed. It specializes in organizing federal, state, and local government security officers, but has been open to representing other types of security personnel since May 2000.

==== Others ====
The Service Employees International Union (SEIU) has also sought to represent security employees. However, the Taft-Hartley Act has complicated its efforts, as it also represents janitors, trash collectors, and other building service employees.

== See also ==
- Access control
- Airport security
- Auxiliary police
- Armored car (valuables)
- Car guard
- Certified Protection Officer
- Commissionaire
- Counterterrorism
- Infrastructure security
- List of private security companies
- Northern Ireland Security Guard Service
- Nuclear security
- Paramilitary
- Physical security
- Police officer
- Port security
- Prison officer
- Private investigator
- Private military company
- Private security company
- Store detective
- Traffic guard
- Transportation security officer
- Use of force continuum
- Warden
