= List of largest companies in the European Union by revenue =

This is a list of notable European companies. For further information on the types of business entities in this union and their abbreviations, see "Business entities in the European Union".

Volkswagen is the largest company in European Union and the largest car manufacturer in the world by revenue.

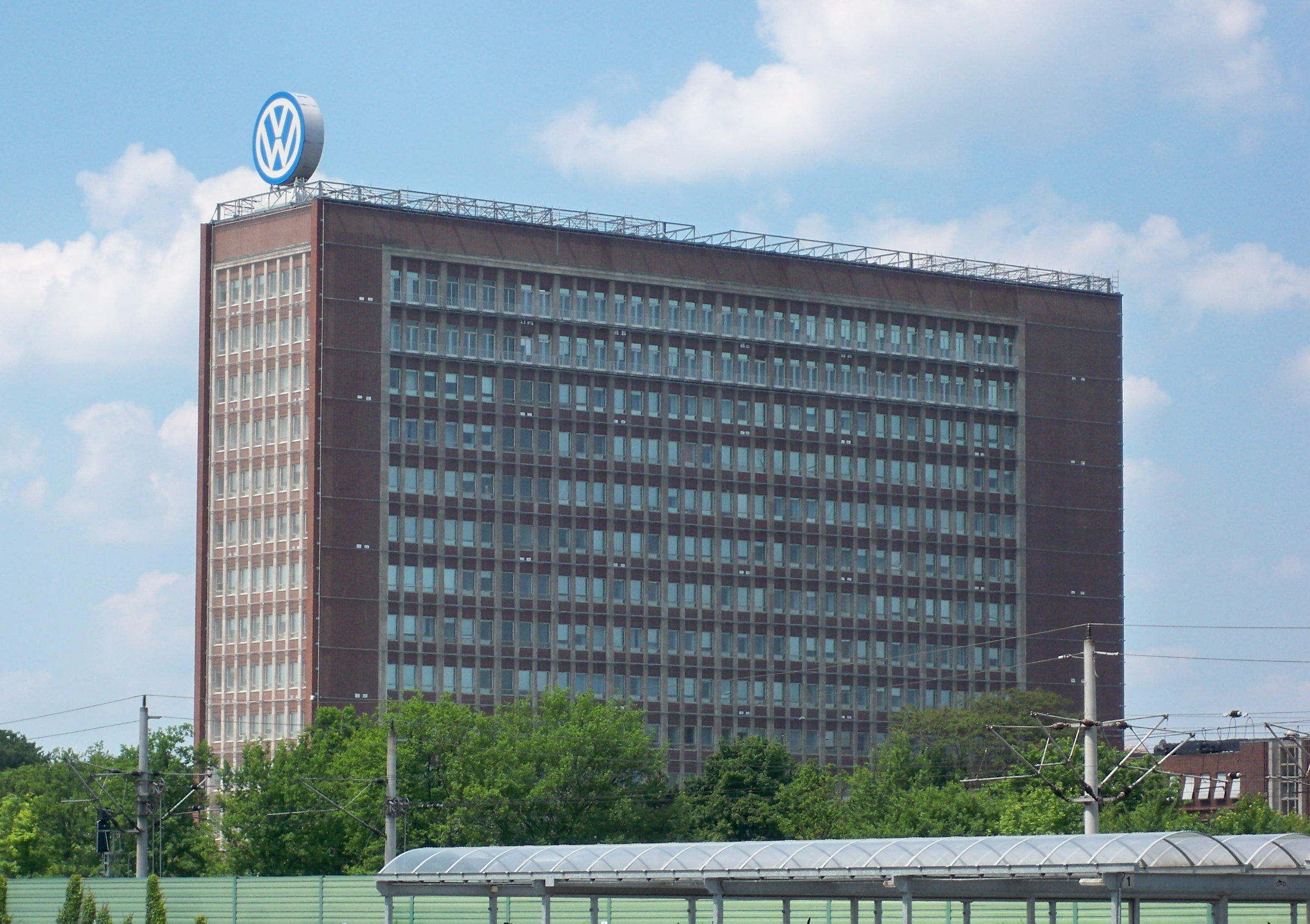
Volkswagen AG headquarters in Wolfsburg, Germany. Volkswagen is European Union's largest and the world's 15th largest company by revenue

== Breakdown by country ==
These are the top 13 countries with the highest revenues from the top 500 companies as of August 2023 in the EU.

Breakdown by country
Rank	Country	Companies
1	Germany	26
2	France	25
3	Netherlands	7
3	Spain	7
4	Italy	6
5	Austria	1
5	Belgium	1
5	Denmark	1
5	Ireland	1
5	Luxembourg	1
5	Poland	1
5	Sweden	1

== 2023 Fortune Global 500 List ==
The following is a list of 50 largest European Union companies in 2022, ordered by revenue in billions of US dollars.

Rank	Company	Industry	Headquarters	Revenue (US$)
1	Volkswagen	Automotive	Wolfsburg, Germany	293.685
2	Uniper	Electric utility	Düsseldorf, Germany	288.309
3	TotalEnergies	Oil and gas	Paris, France	263.310
4	Stellantis	Automotive	France; Italy	188.888
5	Mercedes-Benz Group	Automotive	Stuttgart, Germany	157.782
6	Électricité de France	Electric utility	Paris, France	150.902
7	BMW	Automotive	Munich, Germany	149.991
8	Enel	Electric utility	Rome, Italy	147.790
9	Eni	Oil and gas	Rome, Italy	140.607
10	Allianz	Financial services	Munich, Germany	129.059
11	E.ON	Electric utility	Essen, Germany	121.646
12	Deutsche Telekom	Telecommunications	Bonn, Germany	120.108
13	Engie	Electric utility	Paris, France	109.175
14	Axa	Financial services	Paris, France	109.067
15	DHL Group	Courier	Bonn, Germany	99.324
16	Banco Santander	Financial services	Santander, Spain	99.231
17	Bosch	Conglomerate	Gerlingen, Germany	92.777
18	BASF	Chemicals	Ludwigshafen, Germany	91.847
19	Ahold Delhaize	Retail	Zaandam, Netherlands	91.486
20	Carrefour	Retail	Paris, France	90.062
21	BNP Paribas	Financial services	Paris, France	88.564
22	Crédit Agricole	Financial services	Paris, France	86.471
23	Assicurazioni Generali	Financial services	Trieste, Italy	85.750
24	Dior	Luxury goods	Paris, France	83.283
25	Maersk	Freight transport	Svendborg, Denmark	81.529
26	ArcelorMittal	Steel	Luxembourg City, Luxembourg	79.844
27	Siemens	Conglomerate	Berlin, Germany	77.860
28	Munich Re	Financial services	Munich, Germany	75.747
29	Repsol	Petroleum	Madrid, Spain	72.536
30	Vinci SA	Construction	Nanterre, France	65.750
31	OMV	Petrochemicals	Vienna, Austria	65.523
32	SocGen	Financial services	Paris, France	63.417
33	Orlen	Petroleum	Płock, Poland	62.326
34	Airbus	Aerospace	Toulouse, France	61.805
35	Accenture	Information technology consulting	Dublin, Ireland	61.594
36	Louis Dreyfus Company	Agriculture	Paris, France	59.931
37	Deutsche Bahn	Rail transport	Berlin, Germany	59.210
38	EnBW	Electric utilities	Karlsruhe, Germany	58.901
39	AB InBev	Beverages	Leuven, Belgium	57.786
40	Iberdrola	Electric utility	Bilbao, Spain	56.741
41	Talanx	Financial services	Hanover, Germany	56.029
42	Saint-Gobain	Building materials	Paris, France	53.847
43	Daimler Truck	Automotive	Stuttgart, Germany	53.582
44	Bayer	Pharmaceuticals, Chemicals, Biotechnology, Healthcare	Leverkusen, Germany	53.365
45	LyondellBasell	Chemicals	Rotterdam, Netherlands	50.451
46	Renault	Automotive	Paris, France	49.924
47	Edeka	Retail	Hamburg, Germany	49.481
48	Energi Danmark Group	Energy market	Aarhus, Denmark	48.717
49	ING Group	Financial services	Amsterdam, France	48.062
50	Sanofi	Pharmaceuticals, Biotechnology, Healthcare	Paris, France	47.738

== By Member State ==
(European Union) Austria

(European Union) Belgium

(European Union) Bulgaria

(European Union) Croatia

(European Union) Cyprus

(European Union) Czech Republic

(European Union) Denmark

(European Union) Estonia

(European Union) Finland

(European Union) France

(European Union) Germany

(European Union) Greece

(European Union) Hungary

(European Union) Ireland

(European Union) Italy

(European Union) Latvia

(European Union) Lithuania

(European Union) Luxembourg

(European Union) Malta

(European Union) Netherlands

(European Union) Poland

(European Union) Portugal

(European Union) Romania

(European Union) Slovakia

(European Union) Slovenia

(European Union) Spain

(European Union) Sweden

== See also ==
- List of largest companies in Europe by revenue
