= List of largest European manufacturing companies by revenue =

The following is a list of the largest European manufacturing companies, ordered by revenue in billions of US dollars, as of 2000.

== Largest European Manufacturing Companies By Revenue ==
Company	Sales	Headquarters	Industry
Volkswagen Group	254.0	Germany	Automotive
Mercedes-Benz Group	150.8	Germany	Automotive
Fiat Chrysler Automobiles	110.4	ItalyUnited States	Automotive
BASF	103.9	Germany	Chemicals
Nestlé	100.6	Switzerland	Food
Siemens	100.6	Germany	Engineering, various
BMW	98.8	Germany	Automotive
Bosch	85.4	Germany	Engineering, various
ArcelorMittal	84.2	Luxembourg	Metals
Airbus	74.5	France	Aerospace and defence
Peugeot	73.1	France	Automotive
Unilever	67.7	United Kingdom	Food, household and personal care
Saint-Gobain	57.0	France	Building materials
Novartis	56.7	Switzerland	Pharmaceuticals
Renault	54.4	France	Automotive
Bayer	52.5	Germany	Pharmaceuticals, chemicals
ThyssenKrupp	51.6	Germany	Metals, various
Roche	49.7	Switzerland	Pharmaceuticals
Volvo	46.7	Sweden	Automotive
LyondellBasell	46.4	Netherlands/United States	Chemicals
Sanofi	46.1	France	Pharmaceuticals
Continental AG	43.2	Germany	Engineering, various
GSK plc	43.0	United Kingdom/ United States	Pharmaceuticals
IKEA	41.9	Sweden	Ready-to-assemble furniture
ABB	40.1	Switzerland	Engineering, various
Inditex	40.1	Spain	Textile
AB InBev	39.8	Belgium/United States	Beverages
Nokia	39.8	Finland	Telecommunications equipment
Christian Dior	38.6	France	Apparel and accessories
Heraeus*	36.4	Germany	Engineering, various
Ericsson	35.0	Sweden	Telecommunications equipment
Ineos*	33.1	United Kingdom	Chemicals
Philips	32.7	Netherlands	Electronics
Schneider Electric	31.6	France	Engineering, various
Jaguar Land Rover	30.8	United Kingdom	Automotive
L'Oréal	28.9	France	Cosmetics
AstraZeneca	28.6	United Kingdom/ Sweden	Pharmaceuticals
Michelin	28.3	France	Tyres
Danone	27.5	France	Food
CNH Industrial	27.4	ItalyUnited States	Capital goods
Rostec	27.2	Russia	Electronics, various
Alstom	26.6	France	Engineering, various
BAE Systems	26.3	United Kingdom	Aerospace and defence
Fresenius	24.8	Germany	Medical equipment
Metro AG	24.7	Germany	Wholesaling
CRH plc	24.6	Ireland	Building materials
Heineken N.V.	24.3	Netherlands	Beverages
British American Tobacco	24.3	United Kingdom	Tobacco
Imperial Brands	23.7	United Kingdom	Tobacco
Holcim	23.5	Switzerland	Building materials
Leonardo S.p.A.	22.4	Italy	Aerospace and defence
Henkel	21.8	Germany	Household and personal care
Lafarge	20.9	France	Building materials
AkzoNobel	20.3	Netherlands	Chemicals
Air Liquide	20.2	France	Chemicals
Linde plc	20.2	Germany/United States	Chemicals
Associated British Foods	19.8	United Kingdom	Food
Rolls-Royce Holdings	19.8	United Kingdom	Aerospace and defence
Adidas	19.6	Germany	Apparel and accessories
Johnson Matthey	19.3	United Kingdom	Chemicals
Alcatel-Lucent	19.1	France United States	Telecommunications equipment
Thales Group	18.2	France	Aerospace and defence
Heidelberg Materials	18.0	Germany	Building materials
Safran	18.0	France	Aerospace and defence
Aurubis	17.7	Germany	Metals
Diageo	16.9	United Kingdom	Beverages
Electrolux	16.9	Sweden	Consumer durables
SABMiller	16.7	United Kingdom	Beverages
Umicore	16.6	Belgium	Metals
Evraz	16.4	United Kingdom	Metals
Solvay S.A.	16.4	BelgiumFrance	Chemicals
Eaton Corporation	16.3	Ireland/United States	Engineering, various
Seagate Technology	16.3	Ireland/ United States	Electronics
Voestalpine	16.1	Austria	Metals
Reckitt Benckiser	15.6	United Kingdom	Household and personal care
Delphi Automotive	15.5	Ireland United States	Automotive components
Sandvik	15.2	Sweden	Engineering, various
Valeo	15.1	France	Automotive components
Yara International	15.1	Norway	Chemicals
Merck KGaA	15.0	Germany	Pharmaceuticals
Stora Enso	14.3	Finland	Pulp and paper
Severstal	14.1	Russia	Metals
Ingersoll-Rand	14.0	Ireland United States	Engineering, various
Novo Nordisk	13.8	Denmark	Pharmaceuticals
UPM Kymmene	13.6	Finland	Pulp and paper
Atlas Copco	13.4	Sweden	Engineering, various
Salzgitter AG	13.4	Germany	Metals
TE Connectivity	13.2	Switzerland United States	Electronics
SCA	13.1	Sweden	Pulp and paper
Evraz	12.8	Russia	Metals
Kering	12.8	France	Apparel and accessories
Norilsk Nickel	12.8	Russia	Metals
NLMK	12.2	Russia	Metals
Covidien	12.0	Ireland United States	Medical equipment
DSM	12.0	Netherlands	Chemicals
Lanxess	11.7	Germany	Chemicals
Norsk Hydro	11.7	Norway	Metals
Carlsberg	11.6	Denmark	Beverages
Mechel	11.4	Russia	Metals
Gruppo Riva	10.2	Italy	Metals
Tenaris	11.1	Luxembourg	Oil and gas equipment
UC Rusal	11.0	Russia	Metals
GKN	10.6	United Kingdom	Automotive components
Tyco International	10.5	Switzerland/ United States	Engineering, various
Pernod Ricard	10.4	France	Beverages
Ferrero	10.2	Italy	Food
Prysmian Group	10.1	Italy/United States/ France	Cable
Sibur	10.0	Russia	Chemicals

== See also ==
- List of largest manufacturing companies by revenue
- List of largest European companies by revenue
- List of European financial services companies by revenue
- List of largest companies by revenue
- List of public corporations by market capitalization
- List of largest corporate profits and losses
- Fortune Global 500
- List of wealthiest organizations
