= ISS A/S =

Danish facility management company

- Type: Public
- Traded as: Nasdaq Copenhagen: ISS; OMX Copenhagen 25 component
- ISIN: DK0060542181
- Founded: 1901; 125 years ago
- Headquarters: Copenhagen, Denmark
- Key people: Kasper Fangel (CEO); Niels Smedegaard (chairman); Lars Petersson (deputy chairman)
- Revenue: 69.823 billion DKK (2020)
- Operating income: ▲3.226 billion DKK (2020)
- Net income: ▲5,195 million DKK (2020)
- Total assets: 48,782,000,000 Danish krone (2016)
- Number of employees: 378,946 (2020)
- Website: issworld.com

ISS A/S (International Service System) is a facility management services company founded in Copenhagen, Denmark in 1901. ISS's core services include: security, cleaning, technical, food and workplace. The ISS Group’s revenue amounted to DKK 69.823 billion in 2020 and ISS has nearly 400,000 employees and activities in countries across Europe, Asia, North America, Latin America and the Pacific.

== History ==
The company was founded in 1901 in Copenhagen, Denmark as a small security company with 20 night watchmen named København-Frederiksberg Nattevagt (English: Copenhagen-Frederiksberg Night Watch). The company expanded into the cleaning business with the establishment of Det Danske Rengørings Selskab (The Danish Cleaning Company) in 1934 as an independent subsidiary of the security company. It then expanded into Sweden in 1946 when a Swedish subsidiary established. The company adopted its current name, International Service System, in 1968.

ISS expanded into Austria and Spain in 1971, at the same time that it acquired part of Servi Systems Oy. It began expanding overseas in 1973 and its global revenue surpassed 1 billion DKK in 1975. ISS went public in 1977 when its shares were listed on the Copenhagen Stock Exchange. The firm takes a major stake in the New York based Prudential Building Maintenance Corp in 1979. By 1989, the total number of employees under the Group reached 100,000.

The U.S.-based arm of the company was merged and sold off in 1995 after the discovery of about a decade of accounting irregularities. In 1999 ISS acquired Abilis, the second largest European provider of cleaning and specialised services, in a DKK 3.6 billion acquisition, the Group’s largest ever. Abilis had about 50,000 employees and annual revenues of 5.2 billion DKK in 1998. The total number of employees in the Group reached 200,000 in 1999, doubling in just 10 years. In 2005, ISS A/S was acquired by funds advised by EQT AB and Goldman Sachs Alternatives, and delisted from the Copenhagen Stock Exchange. The next year, the second-largest acquisition in company history was made when ISS acquired the outstanding 51% of the shares in Tempo Services in Australia. In 2007, it expanded its portfolio in the United States through the acquisition of Sanitors Inc.

By 2010, ISS's revenue had passed 70 billion DKK and it total number of employees had reached 500,000. The British security company G4S announced in 2011 it will acquire ISS in a deal worth £5.2 billion. The deal was later shelved, owing to shareholder unrest. In 2012, Ontario Teachers' Pension Plan and Lego Group owners KIRKBI Invest A/S make EUR 500 million investment in ISS. ISS was listed on the OMX Nasdaq Copenhagen Stock Exchange in 2014 in Denmark’s largest IPO in two decades. ISS entered a commercial agreement with IBM in 2016 to use IBM Watson's Internet of Things platform to transform the management of over 25,000 buildings around the world.

In 2016, the company acquired UK, Ireland, and European activities of UK-based GS Hall, a technical services company focused on mechanical and electrical engineering, energy management, and compliance. That same year, it acquired Chile's fourth largest catering company, Apunto, with an annual revenue of DKK 116 million in 2015. In April 2017, ISS announced that it had acquired US catering services company Guckenheimer with an annual revenue of approximately DKK 2,300 million and 3,200 employees in 33 US states. The company signed its largest customer agreement in its history in 2017 with Deutsche Telekom, covering approximately 9,000 sites across Germany, more than 6,000 employees and about 4% of Group revenue.

== Operations ==
Principal Subsidiaries

1. ISS Europe A/S
2. ISS Services A/S
3. ISS Finans A/S
4. ISS Nordic A/S
5. ISS Overseas A/S

Principal Divisions

1. CarePartner
2. Damage Control
3. Facility Services
4. Food Services
5. ISS Aviation

== See also ==
- Facility management
- List of largest Danish companies
