= List of largest companies in Europe by revenue =

This list presents Europe's largest companies by revenue according to the 2026 Fortune Global 500, which reports financial results primarily for 2025.

In 2025, largest company in Europe was the Volkswagen Group with revenue of US$363 billion.

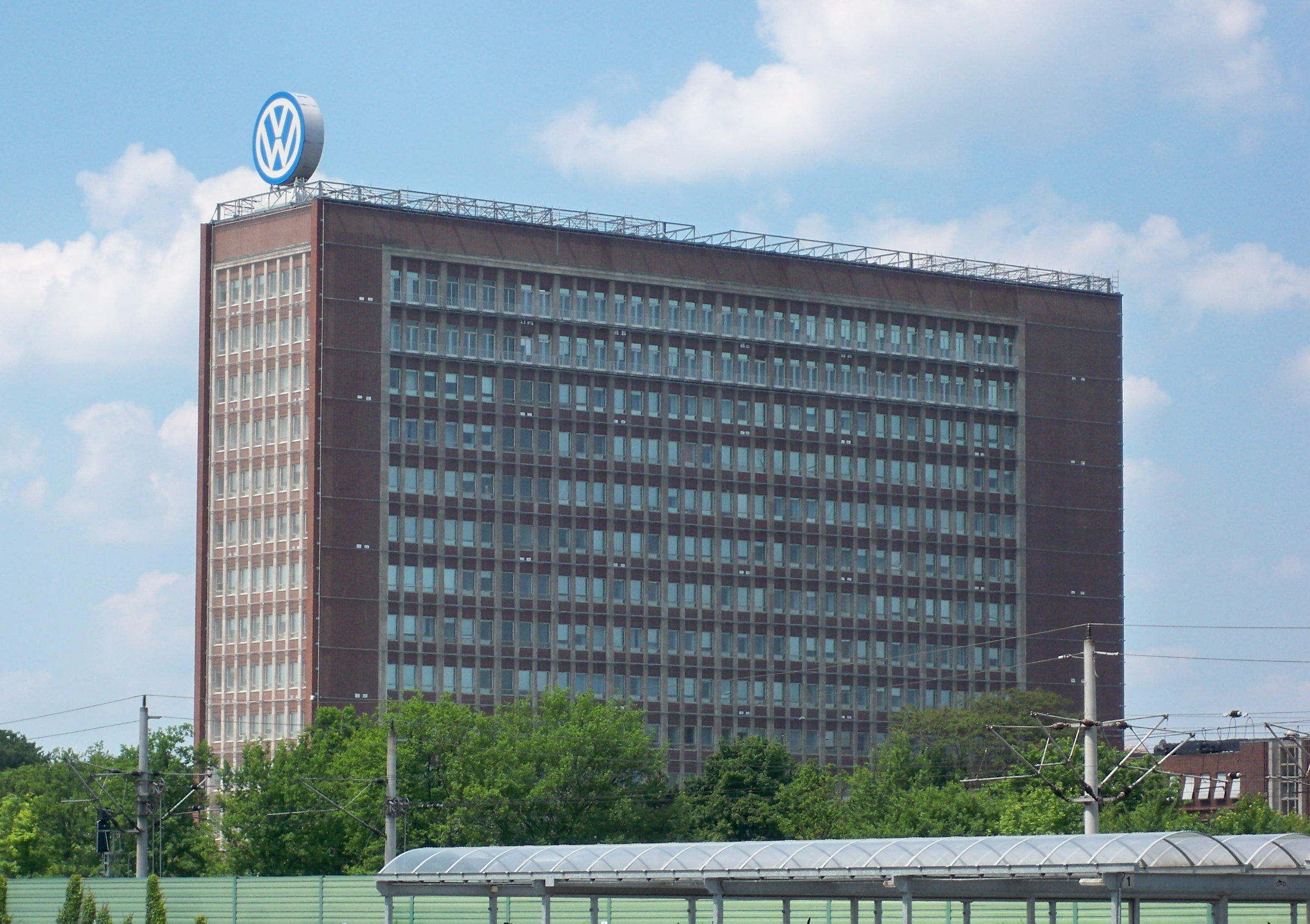
Volkswagen Group headquarters in Wolfsburg, Germany. Volkswagen is Europe's largest and the world's twelfth-largest company by revenue

== Fortune Global 500 List ==
=== Breakdown by country ===
The following table shows the number of companies headquartered in each European country.

Rank	Country	Companies
1	Germany	28
2	France	24
3	United Kingdom	21
4	Switzerland	12
5=	Netherlands	9
5=	Russia	9
5=	Spain	9
8	Italy	6
9=	Denmark	3
9=	Ireland	3
11=	Austria	1
11=	Belgium	1
11=	Czech Republic	1
11=	Luxembourg	1
11=	Norway	1
11=	Poland	1
11=	Portugal	1
11=	Sweden	1
11=	Turkey	1
Total		133

=== Companies by revenue ===
Below are the 100 largest companies by revenue headquartered in Europe. It includes companies that publish financial data and report their figures to a government agency. Some large European companies, such as Vitol and Schwarz Group, do not appear in its ranking.

European rank	Company	Industry	Revenue (US$ billions)	Headquarters country
1	Volkswagen	Automotive	363.091	Germany
2	Shell	Oil and gas	273.731	United Kingdom
3	Glencore	Mining and commodity trading	247.535	Switzerland
4	BP	Oil and gas	192.549	United Kingdom
5	TotalEnergies	Oil and gas	182.344	France
6	Stellantis	Automotive	173.144	Netherlands
7	BMW	Automotive	150.524	Germany
8	Mercedes-Benz Group	Automotive	149.126	Germany
9	Banco Santander	Banking	145.070	Spain
10	BNP Paribas	Banking	141.642	France
11	HSBC	Banking	135.617	United Kingdom
12	Sberbank	Banking	135.076	Russia
13	Deutsche Telekom	Telecommunications	134.313	Germany
14	Allianz	Insurance	133.984	Germany
15	EDF	Utilities	127.754	France
16	Gazprom	Energy	114.868	Russia
17	Nestlé	Food and beverages	107.737	Switzerland
18	Axa	Insurance	107.710	France
19	Equinor	Oil and gas	106.462	Norway
20	Ahold Delhaize	Retail	104.165	Netherlands
21	REWE Group	Retail	102.755	Germany
22	Bosch	Engineering and technology	102.605	Germany
23	Société Générale	Banking	102.423	France
24	Tesco	Retail	98.502	United Kingdom
25	Carrefour	Retail	98.381	France
26	Rosneft	Oil and gas	98.223	Russia
27	Eni	Oil and gas	94.326	Italy
28	DHL Group	Logistics	93.453	Germany
29	Dior	Luxury goods	91.143	France
30	Enel	Utilities	90.624	Italy
31	E.ON	Energy	88.771	Germany
32	Siemens	Industrial technology	87.066	Germany
33	BBVA	Banking	87.005	Spain
34	JBS	Food and agriculture	86.184	Netherlands
35	Lloyds Banking Group	Banking	85.430	United Kingdom
36	Vinci	Construction and engineering	85.387	France
37	Crédit Agricole	Banking	84.368	France
38	Airbus	Aerospace and defence	82.812	Netherlands
39	Engie	Energy	81.147	France
40	Groupe BPCE	Banking	78.937	France
41	UBS Group	Banking	78.786	Switzerland
42	Roche	Pharmaceuticals	76.274	Switzerland
43	EP Group	Conglomerate	75.387	Czech Republic
44	Barclays	Banking	71.930	United Kingdom
45	ING Group	Banking	71.899	Netherlands
46	Deutsche Bank	Banking	71.623	Germany
47	BASF	Chemicals	71.513	Germany
48	Orlen	Oil and gas	71.277	Poland
49	Bunge	Agricultural commodities	70.329	Switzerland
50	VTB Bank	Banking	69.867	Russia
51	Munich Re	Insurance	69.816	Germany
52	Zurich Insurance Group	Insurance	69.780	Switzerland
53	Koç Holding	Conglomerate	69.742	Turkey
54	Accenture	IT services and consulting	69.673	Ireland
55	Uniper	Energy	68.752	Germany
56	Assicurazioni Generali	Insurance	67.321	Italy
57	Unilever	Consumer goods	65.638	United Kingdom
58	Renault	Automotive	65.331	France
59	Bouygues	Construction and engineering	64.192	France
60	Edeka	Retail	63.534	Germany
61	Lukoil	Oil and gas	62.644	Russia
62	ArcelorMittal	Metals	61.352	Luxembourg
63	Chubb	Insurance	59.402	Switzerland
64	AB InBev	Beverages	59.320	Belgium
65	AstraZeneca	Pharmaceuticals	58.739	United Kingdom
66	Rio Tinto	Mining and commodities	57.638	United Kingdom
67	Crédit Mutuel	Financial services	57.518	France
68	Novartis	Pharmaceuticals	56.674	Switzerland
69	Talanx	Insurance	56.646	Germany
70	ACS Group	Construction and engineering	56.224	Spain
71	Daimler Truck	Automotive	55.704	Germany
72	X5 Group	Retail	55.361	Russia
73	Sanofi	Pharmaceuticals	54.650	France
74	Repsol	Oil and gas	54.534	Spain
75	Maersk	Shipping and logistics	53.988	Denmark
76	Louis Dreyfus Company	Agricultural commodities	53.197	Netherlands
77	Saint-Gobain	Building materials	52.429	France
78	Intesa Sanpaolo	Banking	51.445	Italy
79	Bayer	Pharmaceuticals and agriculture	51.405	Germany
80	Iberdrola	Utilities	51.373	Spain
81	Veolia	Environmental services	50.075	France
82	L'Oréal	Cosmetics	49.687	France
83	Volvo Group	Commercial vehicles and equipment	48.828	Sweden
84	Heraeus	Materials and technology	48.719	Germany
85	SNCF	Rail transport	48.490	France
86	Vodafone	Telecommunications	46.906	United Kingdom
87	Novo Nordisk	Pharmaceuticals	46.711	Denmark
88	Compass Group	Food services	46.070	United Kingdom
89	Orange	Telecommunications	45.563	France
90	Ingka Group	Retail	45.531	Netherlands
91	Inditex	Retail	45.448	Spain
92	Schneider Electric	Electrical equipment	45.288	France
93	Sainsbury's	Retail	45.230	United Kingdom
94	UniCredit	Banking	44.708	Italy
95	Lufthansa Group	Air transport	44.662	Germany
96	Swiss Re	Insurance	44.090	Switzerland
97	ZF Friedrichshafen	Automotive components	43.774	Germany
98	Russian Railways	Rail transport	43.386	Russia
99	Siemens Energy	Energy technology	43.114	Germany
100	Mercadona	Retail	43.062	Spain

== See also ==
- List of companies by revenue
- List of largest companies in the European Union by revenue
- List of largest European manufacturing companies by revenue
- List of European financial services companies by revenue
- List of largest manufacturing companies by revenue
- List of largest employers
- List of companies by profit and loss
- List of public corporations by market capitalization
- EURO STOXX 50
- STOXX Europe 50
- Fortune Global 500
- List of wealthiest organizations
