= Infratek (company) =

Infratek ASA
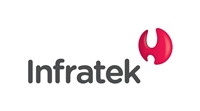
- Company type: Allmennaksjeselskap (OSE: INFRA)
- Industry: Critical Infrastructure
- Founded: 2007; 19 years ago
- Headquarters: Oslo, Norway
- Key people: CEO
- Number of employees: 1,350
- Website: www.infratekgroup.com

Infratek is a company based in Norway, Sweden, Finland and Denmark, with its main office in Oslo, Norway. Infratek has 1,350 employees and had revenues of approximately NOK 2.7 billion in 2015.

== History ==
Up until 2007 Infratek constituted the business area Technical Services in the Norwegian power corporation Hafslund ASA, when it was listed as a separate company on the Oslo Stock Exchange on December 5, 2007.

In 2009 the company expanded from 1000 employees to 2000 employees with the acquisition of the Fortum Contracting Entities in Norway, Sweden and Finland.

== Operations ==
The company is a supplier in the market for building, operating and securing of critical infrastructure. Infratek offers services within power grids, railway systems, fiber networks, district heating, public street lighting and technical high security services. The Infratek Group is divided into three business areas: Central Infrastructure, Local Infrastructure and Security.
