= List of European financial services companies by revenue =

The following is a list of the largest European financial services companies, ordered by revenue in millions of US dollars.

== European financial services companies by revenue ==
Rank	Company	Revenue	Headquarters
1	ING	150,571	Netherlands
2	AXA	142,712	France
3	Allianz	134,167	Germany
4	BNP Paribas	127,460	France
5	Banco Santander	117,408	Spain
6	Assicurazioni Generali	112,628	Italy
7	HSBC	110,141	United Kingdom
8	Crédit Agricole	105,156	France
9	Société Générale	98,463	France
10	Munich Re	90,137	Germany
11	Groupe BPCE	75,082	France
12	Deutsche Bank	74,425	Germany
13	Barclays	68,949	United Kingdom
14	Landesbank Baden-Württemberg	67,431	Germany
15	Lloyds Banking Group	67,048	United Kingdom
16	NatWest Group	62,798	United Kingdom
17	Aviva	61,754	United Kingdom
18	Prudential	58,527	United Kingdom
19	UniCredit Group	57,213	Italy
20	Zurich Insurance Group	52,983	Switzerland
21	CNP Assurances	51,521	France
22	Banco Bilbao Vizcaya Argentaria	51,021	Spain
23	Intesa Sanpaolo	49,472	Italy
24	Credit Suisse Group	48,227	Switzerland
25	UBS	45,978	Switzerland
26	Aegon	44,197	Netherlands
27	Rabobank Group	37,577	Netherlands
28	Sberbank	35,502	Russia
29	DZ Bank	33,279	Germany
30	Legal & General	29,366	United Kingdom
31	Mapfre	29,224	Spain
32	Dexia Group	28,540	Belgium
33	Swiss Re	28,083	Switzerland
34	KBC Group	26,057	Belgium
35	Standard Chartered	24,488	United Kingdom
36	Nordea Bank	23,258	Finland
37	KfW	22,496	Germany

== See also ==
- List of largest financial services companies by revenue
- List of largest European companies by revenue
- List of largest European manufacturing companies by revenue
- List of largest companies by revenue
- List of largest employers
- List of largest corporate profits and losses
- List of public corporations by market capitalization
- Fortune Global 500
- List of wealthiest organizations
