= Lars G. Petersson =

- Born: 1951 (age 73–74)
- Occupations: Human rights activists, blogger and book writer
- Website: larsgpetersson.com

Lars G. Petersson (born 1951) is a Swedish-British human rights activist, blogger and book writer.

== Career ==
He worked for the human rights organisation Amnesty International in Denmark. He focused on the treatment of refugees in Denmark and the campaign against the death penalty. Currently, he lives in London and is the co-founder of the BASTA-Kampagne.

== Books ==
- Faneflugt – dette er beretningen om viljestærke mænd, tre i særdeleshed, som deserterede, fordi de nægtede at kæmpe for Hitlers terrorregime – det er også beretningen om et internationalt samfund, der vendte dem ryggen (2004, Frihedsmuseets Venners Forlag; ISBN 978-1-904-75412-1) (in Danish; published in English as Broken Oath)
- Deserters (2005, Danish Resistance Museum Publishing; ISBN 978-8-788-21470-3)
- AbuseUK (2010, Verlag Chipmunkapub)
- Musterung (2010, Verlag Chipmunkapub; ISBN 978-1-849-91186-3)
- Medical Rape (2010, Verlag Chipmunkapub)
- Hitlers Fahnenflüchtige (2012, Verlag Chipmunkapub)
