= Fiber network mechanics =

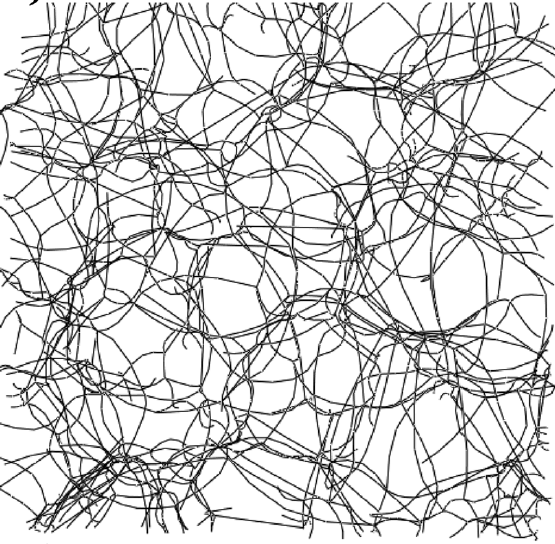
An example fiber network.

Fiber network mechanics is a subject within physics and mechanics that deals with the deformation of networks made by the connection of slender fibers. Fiber networks are used to model the mechanics of fibrous materials such as biopolymer networks and paper products. Depending on the mechanical behavior of individual filaments, the networks may be composed of mechanical elements such as Hookean springs, Euler-Bernoulli beams, and worm-like chains. The field of fiber network mechanics is closely related to the mechanical analysis of frame structures, granular materials, critical phenomena, and lattice dynamics.
