= Mind Energy =

Danish energy trading company

Mind Energy A/S
- Industry: Energy market
- Founded: July 1, 1993; 33 years ago
- Headquarters: Aarhus, Denmark
- Area served: Denmark; Norway; Sweden; Finland
- Revenue: DKK 95.6 billion (2025)
- Number of employees: 339 (2025)
- Website: mindenergy.com

Mind Energy A/S, formerly Energi Danmark A/S, is a Danish trading company which supplies its clients with energy.

The company was founded in 1993 in Denmark. In the beginning it had only a couple of employees but later it grew and started providing services to other Scandinavian countries.
