= List of largest United States–based employers globally =

This is a list of United States–based companies having the most employees globally. For some companies listed, the majority of total employees live and work in other countries.

The US economy is diverse: it is composed of various economic sectors such as the business sector, the private sector, the public sector, and the voluntary sector. Additional classifications include the agricultural (or primary) sector, industrial (or secondary) sector, service (or tertiary) sector, information (or quaternary) sector, and human (or quinary) sector.

== Employment by company ==
Largest United States-based private employers
Rank	Employer	Global number of employees
1	Walmart	2,100,000
2	Amazon.com	1,525,000
3	Allied Universal	800,000
4	Accenture	742,000
5	FedEx Corporation	547,000
6	United Parcel Service	536,000
7	Home Depot	465,000
8	Concentrix Corporation	440,000
9	UnitedHealth Group	440,000
10	Target Corporation	415,000
11	Kroger	414,000
12	Marriott International	411,000
13	Ernst & Young	395,442
14	Berkshire Hathaway	383,000
15	Starbucks	381,000
16	Marsh McLennan	365,000
17	TJX	349,000
18	Cognizant Technology Solutions	344,400
19	Walgreens Boots Alliance	330,000
20	Costco Wholesale Corporation	316,000
21	PepsiCo	318,000
22	J.P. Morgan Chase	309,926
23	Lowe's Companies	300,000
24	IBM	282,200
25	HCA Healthcare	220,000
26	CVS Health	365,000; Out of order
27	Bank of America	212,000

== Employment by major industry sector ==
According to research from the Federal Reserve Economic Data (more specifically, provided by the Bureau of Labor Statistics), health care has now surpassed both manufacturing and retail as the engine for employment growth in the coming decades. There were approximately 16 million people employed in the health care sector in 2017.

Employment by major industry sector
Industry sector	Employee count (as of April 2024) (Note: Seasonally adjusted)
Total	169,583,000 (Note: Total includes all nonfarm industries, plus the 2022 statistics on all workers who are in agriculture, forestry, fishing, hunting, as well as those who are self-employed.)
Total nonfarm	158,286,000
Total private	135,015,000
Goods-producing	21,821,000
Mining and logging	641,000
Logging	42,200
Mining, quarrying, and oil and gas extraction	593,300
Oil and gas extraction	118,500
Mining, except oil and gas	189,700
Coal mining	44,100
Metal ore mining	42,900
Nonmetallic mineral mining and quarrying	102,700
Support activities for mining	290,100
Construction worker	8,219,000
Construction of buildings	1,867,300
Residential building	950,000
Nonresidential building	917,300
Heavy and civil engineering construction	1,146,300
Specialty trade contractors	5,205,100
Residential specialty trade contractors	2,407,400
Nonresidential specialty trade contractors	2,797,700
Manufacturing	12,961,000
Durable goods	8,144,000
Wood products	415,700
Nonmetallic mineral products	422,000
Primary metals	370,700
Fabricated metal products	1,469,600
Machinery	1,139,400
Computer and electronic products	1,102,300
Computer and peripheral equipment	161,000
Communications equipment	85,400
Semiconductors and electronic components	392,100
Navigational, measuring, electromedical, and control instruments	432,900
Magnetic and optical media and audio and visual equipment	31,000
Electrical equipment, appliances, and components	411,100
Transportation equipment (Note: Includes other industries, not shown separately.)	1,841,000
Motor vehicles and parts (Note: Includes motor vehicle manufacturing, motor vehicle body and trailer manufacturing, and motor vehicle parts manufacturing.)	1,063,900
Furniture and related products	345,900
Miscellaneous durable goods manufacturing	626,500
Non-durable goods	4,817,000
Food manufacturing	1,735,500
Textile mills	88,700
Textile product mills	95,400
Apparel	83,400
Paper and paper products	350,300
Printing and related support activities	366,700
Petroleum and coal products	109,200
Chemicals	898,200
Plastics and rubber products	728,100
Beverage, tobacco, and leather and allied products	361,900
Private service-providing	113,194,000
Trade, transportation, and utilities	29,011,000
Wholesale trade	6,169,700
Durable goods	3,425,300
Nondurable goods	2,230,800
Agents and brokers	513,600
Retail trade	15,677,900
Motor vehicle and parts dealers	2,072,700
Automobile dealers	1,298,600
Other motor vehicle dealers	170,900
Automotive parts, accessories, and tire retailers	603,200
Building material and garden supply stores	1,375,600
Food and beverage stores	3,264,400
Furniture, home furnishings, electronics, and appliance stores	821,700
Furniture and home furnishing stores	425,500
Electronics and appliance stores	396,200
General merchandise stores	3,041,600
Department stores	1,377,400
Warehouse clubs, supercenters, and other general merchandise	2,306,500
Health and personal care	1,099,600
Gasoline stations	1,080,600
Clothing, clothing accessories, shoe, and jewelry stores	1,137,800
Sporting goods, hobby, music, book, and miscellaneous stores	1,544,300
Transportation and warehousing	6,575,800
Air transportation	573,900
Rail transportation	153,400
Water transportation	74,900
Truck transportation	1,557,800
Transit and ground passenger transportation	435,100
Pipeline transportation	53,600
Scenic and sightseeing transportation	31,900
Support activities for transportation	839,700
Couriers and messengers	1,079,900
Warehousing and storage	1,775,600
Utilities	587,400
Information	3,013,000
Motion picture and sound recording industries	434,400
Publishing industries	932,400
Broadcasting and content providers	341,100
Telecommunications	630,000
Computing infrastructure, data processing, hosting and related services	498,800
Web search portals, libraries, archives, and other information services	176,400
Financial activities	9,233,000
Finance and insurance	6,732,500
Monetary authorities-central bank	22,600
Credit intermediation and related activities	2,587,700
Depository credit intermediation	1,777,500
Commercial banking	1,366,700
Nondepository credit intermediation	525,700
Activities related to credit intermediation	284,500
Securities, commodity contracts, investments, and funds and trusts	1,112,600
Insurance carriers and related activities	3,009,600
Real estate and rental and leasing	2,500,900
Real estate	1,878,800
Rental and leasing services	598,600
Lessors of nonfinancial intangible assets (excluding copyrighted works)	23,500
Professional and business services	22,942,000
Professional, scientific, and technical services	10,995,500
Legal services	1,190,300
Accounting, tax preparation, bookkeeping, and payroll services	1,164,000
Architectural, engineering, and related services	1,688,800
Specialized design services	154,600
Computer systems design and related services	2,544,300
Management, scientific, and technical consulting services	1,896,400
Scientific research and development services	957,100
Advertising, public relations, and related services	522,900
Other professional, scientific, and technical services	877,100
Management of companies and enterprises	2,555,700
Administrative and support and waste management and remediation services	9,390,300
Administrative and support services	8,872,400
Office administrative services	631,400
Facilities support services	176,700
Employment services (Note: Includes other industries, not shown separately.)	3,516,500
Temporary help services	2,736,700
Business support services	709,800
Travel arrangement and reservation services	194,400
Investigation and security measures	1,015,200
Services to buildings and dwellings	2,284,000
Other support services	344,400
Waste management and remediation services	517,900
Private education and health services	26,194,000
Private educational services	3,869,300
Health care and social assistance	22,324,300
Health care (Note: Includes ambulatory health care services, hospitals, and nursing and residential care facilities.)	17,549,500
Ambulatory health care services	8,754,700
Offices of physicians	3,012,600
Offices of dentists	1,036,300
Offices of other health practitioners	1,203,600
Outpatient care centers	1,081,900
Medical and diagnostic laboratories	322,500
Home health care services	1,741,200
Other ambulatory health care services	356,700
Hospitals	5,527,400
Nursing and residential care facilities	3,267,400
Nursing care facilities	1,466,600
Residential intellectual and developmental disability, mental health, and substance abuse facilities	666,900
Continuing care retirement communities and assisted living for the elderly	970,800
Other residential facilities	163,200
Social Assistance	4,774,800
Individual and family services	3,189,600
Community food and housing, and emergency and other relief services	227,800
Vocational rehabilitation services	289,900
Child care services	1,067,400
Leisure and hospitality	16,897,000
Arts, entertainment, and recreation	2,641,400
Performing arts, spectator sports, and related industries	621,400
Museums, historical sites, and similar institutions	179,400
Amusements, gambling, and recreation	1,840,600
Accommodation and food services	14,255,200
Accommodation	1,923,900
Food services and drinking places	12,331,300
Other services	5,904,000
Repair and maintenance	1,482,200
Personal and laundry services	1,553,800
Religious, grantmaking, civic, professional, and similar organizations	2,867,800
Government	23,271,000
Federal government	2,993,000
Federal government, except U.S. Postal Service	2,386,700
U.S. Postal Service	606,200
State government	5,451,000
State government education	2,669,100
State government, excluding education	2,781,500
Local government	14,827,000
Local government education	8,078,400
Local government, excluding education	6,748,200

== See also ==
- List of companies of the United States by state
- List of largest companies in the United States by revenue
- List of largest employers
- List of multinational corporations
- List of wealthiest religious organizations
- List of largest corporate profits and losses
- List of public corporations by market capitalization
- List of most valuable brands
- List of countries by GDP sector composition
- List of companies by research and development spending
- List of largest private non-governmental companies by revenue
- List of the largest software companies
- List of largest Internet companies
- List of largest companies by revenue
- List of largest technology companies by revenue
- List of largest manufacturing companies by revenue
- List of largest financial services companies by revenue
- List of largest oil and gas companies by revenue
- List of private-equity firms
- Lists of companies
- Lists of occupations
- List of types of tradesman
- Fortune Global 500
- Forbes Global 2000
- List of DJIA companies
- NASDAQ Financial-100
- List of S&P 500 companies
- List of S&P 400 companies
- Economy of the United States
- List of economic expansions in the United States
- List of recessions in the United States
- Unemployment in the United States
- Technological unemployment
