= List of most indebted companies =

The following article lists the indebted companies in the world by total corporate debt according estimates by the British-Australian investment firm Janus Henderson. In 2019, the total debt of the 900 most indebted companies was $8,325 billion. The most indebted companies were in the oil and gas, utilities, telecommunication and automotive industries. The world's most indebted company in 2021 was Toyota.

The most indebted company in history was General Electric, holding in 2008 $550 billion of debt.

== 2023/24 Top 20 ==
The 20 companies with the highest debt in 2023/24.

Company	Country	Industry	Debt (billions of US$)
Volkswagen AG	Germany	Automotive	196
Toyota	Japan	Automotive	179
Verizon Communications	United States	Telecommunications	172
AT&T	United States	Telecommunications	152
Deutsche Telekom AG	Germany	Telecommunications	150
Ford Motor Company	United States	Automotive	111
Charter Communications	United States	Telecommunications	98
Comcast	United States	Telecommunications Mass media	97
Mercedes-Benz Group AG	Germany	Automotive	96
General Motors	United States	Automotive	94
Enel SpA	Italy	Energy	82
Oracle	United States	Information technology	82
Duke Energy	United States	Energy	80
BMW	Germany	Automotive	80
Hyundai	South Korea	Automotive	75
NextEra Energy	United States	Energy	71
CVS Health	United States	Healthcare Retail	68
Anheuser-Busch InBev	Belgium	Beverages	68
UnitedHealth Group	United States	Healthcare	67
Amazon	United States	Retail Information technology	67

== 2021 Top 20 ==
The 20 companies with the highest debt in 2021.

Rank	Company	Country	Debt (billions of US$)
1	Toyota	Japan	186
2	Volkswagen AG	Germany	185
3	AT&T	United States	182
4	Verizon Communications	United States	174
5	Deutsche Telekom AG	Germany	153
6	Mercedes-Benz Group AG	Germany	109
7	Électricité de France SA	France	104
8	Comcast	United States	98
9	BMW	Germany	96
10	Charter Communications	United States	92
11	Ford Motor Company	United States	90
12	General Motors	United States	79
13	Anheuser-Busch and In-Bev	Belgium	76
14	Enel SpA	Italy	72
15	Duke Energy	United States	68
16	AbbVie, Inc.	United States	68
17	Korea Electric Power	South Korea	68
18	Nippon Telegraph and Telephone	Japan	67
19	Hyundai	South Korea	65
20	Vodafone	United Kingdom	62

== 2019 Top 20 ==
The 20 companies with the highest debt in 2019.

Rank	Company	Country	Debt (billions of US$)
1	Volkswagen AG	Germany	192
2	AT&T	United States	176
3	Daimler AG	Germany	151
4	Toyota	Japan	138
5	SoftBank Group	Japan	135
6	Verizon Communications	United States	129
7	Ford Motor Company	United States	122
8	BMW	Germany	114
9	Comcast	United States	104
10	Anheuser-Busch and InBev	Belgium	96
11	Deutsche Telekom	Germany	87
12	CVS Health	United States	81
13	Petrobras	Brazil	79
14	Royal Dutch Shell	Netherlands	78
15	General Motors	United States	78
16	Charter Communications	United States	77
17	PetroChina	China	76
18	Walmart	United States	63
19	Duke Energy	United States	62
20	Korea Electric Power Corporation	South Korea	60

== 2016 Top 20 ==
The 20 companies with the highest debt in 2016.

Rank	Company	Country	Debt (billions of US$)
1	AT&T	United States	139
2	Volkswagen AG	Germany	136
3	Verizon Communications	United States	126
4	Toyota	Japan	119
5	Anheuser-Busch and InBev	Belgium	107
6	Daimler AG	Germany	104
7	Ford Motor Company	United States	104
8	Petrobras	Brazil	95
9	BMW	Germany	95
10	General Electric	United States	91
11	Royal Dutch Shell	Netherlands	89
12	SoftBank Group	Japan	82
13	PetroChina	China	81
14	Deutsche Telekom	Germany	76
15	Telefónica	Spain	69
16	Charter Communications	United States	61
17	Walmart	United States	58
18	General Motors	United States	58
19	Comcast	United States	58
20	Électricité de France	France	57

== 2014 Top 20 ==
The 20 companies with the highest debt in 2014.

Rank	Company	Country	Debt (billions of US$)
1	General Electric	United States	278
2	Volkswagen AG	Germany	134
3	Verizon Communications	United States	123
4	Toyota	Japan	115
5	Petrobras	Brazil	105
6	PetroChina	China	96
7	AT&T	United States	93
8	Daimler AG	Germany	90
9	Ford Motor Company	United States	88
10	BMW	Germany	84
11	Deutsche Telekom	Germany	79
12	Telefónica	Spain	73
13	Sinopec	China	71
14	SoftBank Group	Japan	70
15	Walmart	United States	66
16	Korea Electric Power Corporation	South Korea	57
17	Mitsubishi Corporation	Japan	55
18	Électricité de France	France	53
19	Rosneft	Russia	50
20	Orange S.A.	France	48

== See also ==
- List of largest companies by revenue
- List of largest employers
- List of largest corporate profits and losses
- List of public corporations by market capitalization
- List of most valuable brands
