= List of most valuable brands =

The following article lists the most valuable corporate brands in the world according to different estimates by Interbrand, Kantar Group and Brand Finance. Factors that influence brand value are sales, market share, market capitalization, awareness of a brand, products, popularity, image, etc. This list is subjective, as each ranking uses differing methodologies.

== Kantar BrandZ’s Most Valuable Global Brands list (2026) ==
The 100 most valuable brands in 2026 according to Kantar.

Rank	Brand	Country	Brand value (US$ millions)
1	Google	United States	1,484,895
2	Apple Inc.	United States	1,380,294
3	Microsoft	United States	1,111,788
4	Amazon	United States	1,022,820
5	Nvidia	United States	814,906
6	Facebook	United States	366,624
7	Instagram	United States	286,158
8	Tencent	China	251,551
9	Oracle Corporation	United States	235,838
10	McDonald's	United States	235,095
11	Visa Inc.	United States	228,570
12	Mastercard	United States	184,721
13	Walmart	United States	176,706
14	YouTube	United States	168,547
15	ChatGPT	United States	167,765
16	IBM	United States	150,760
17	Netflix	United States	139,422
18	T-Mobile	Germany	124,636
19	Alibaba	China	122,266
20	Coca-Cola	United States	121,324
21	Costco	United States	114,288
22	Hermès	France	113,136
23	Tesla	United States	112,097
24	AT&T	United States	107,032
25	TikTok	China	98,436
26	SAP	Germany	98,183
27	Claude	United States	96,577
28	AMD	United States	91,089
29	Verizon	United States	90,494
30	Cisco	United States	90,483
31	Home Depot	United States	87,634
32	Louis Vuitton	France	87,532
33	VMWare	United States	84,311
34	Aramco	Saudi Arabia	82,917
35	American Express	United States	80,316
36	JPMorgan	United States	76,651
37	LinkedIn	United States	76,485
38	Moutai	China	73,630
39	Marlboro	United States	73,336
40	Intel	United States	69,108
41	Huawei	China	68,156
42	Starbucks	United States	66,210
43	Chase	United States	63,078
44	Siemens	Germany	61,126
45	Uber	United States	58,186
46	Salesforce	United States	56,110
47	Intuit	United States	55,516
48	ADP	United States	55,505
49	MercadoLibre	Argentina	54,998
50	Texas Instruments	United States	54,924
51	Chanel	France	53,127
52	Disney	United States	52,968
53	Haier	China	52,949
54	Wells Fargo	United States	52,904
55	RBC	Canada	51,480
56	Snapdragon	United States	51,053
57	ICBC	China	50,513
58	Adobe	United States	50,511
59	China Mobile	China	50,315
60	ServiceNow	United States	49,457
61	Samsung	South Korea	48,736
62	Airtel	India	47,628
63	HDFC Bank	India	47,507
64	Accenture	Ireland	45,240
65	UPS	United States	45,234
66	Zara	Spain	44,088
67	XBOX	United States	43,972
68	CommBank	Australia	43,306
69	Nike	United States	41,188
70	Stripe	United States	40,187
71	Ping An	China	37,219
72	Dell Technologies	United States	37,124
73	L’Oréal Paris	France	36,854
74	IQOS	United States	36,634
75	Morgan Stanley	United States	36,509
76	Agricultural Bank of China	China	36,332
77	Bank of America	United States	35,942
78	Spotify	Sweden	34,930
79	Spectrum	United States	34,904
80	Booking.com	United States	33,389
81	Xiaomi	China	32,502
82	TCS	India	32,416
83	KFC	United States	32,180
84	Toyota	Japan	31,772
85	China Construction Bank	China	30,302
86	Lowe's	United States	30,094
87	China Life	China	29,762
88	Xfinity	United States	29,580
89	HSBC	United Kingdom	29,558
90	Sony	Japan	28,897
91	ExxonMobil	United States	28,097
92	Hilton	United States	28,036
93	Aldi	Germany	27,702
94	Uniqlo	Japan	27,284
95	TD	Canada	27,065
96	DoorDash	United States	26,533
97	UnitedHealthcare	United States	26,419
98	Charles Schwab	United States	26,083
99	FedEx	United States	25,739
100	BCA	Indonesia	25,663

== Brand Finance list (2026) ==
The 50 most valuable corporate brands in 2026 according to Brand Finance.

Rank	Brand	Country	Brand value (US$ billions)
1	Apple	United States	608
2	Microsoft	United States	565
3	Google	United States	433
4	Amazon.com	United States	370
5	Nvidia	United States	184
6	TikTok/Douyin	China	154
7	Walmart	United States	141
8	Samsung	South Korea	119
9	Facebook	United States	107
10	State Grid Corporation	China	102
11	T-Mobile	Germany	96
12	ICBC	China	91
13	Instagram	United States	81
14	China Construction Bank	China	77
15	Home Depot	United States	73
16	Verizon	United States	73
17	Bank of China	China	71
18	Oracle	United States	68
19	Agricultural Bank of China	China	63
20	Toyota	Japan	63
21	Allianz Group	Germany	61
22	Moutai	China	60
23	American Express	United States	57
24	UnitedHealthcare	United States	55
25	AT&T	United States	54
26	Costco	United States	53
27	Tencent	China	52
28	Shell	United Kingdom	52
29	Disney	United States	51
30	Uber	United States	50
31	China Mobile	China	49
32	Ping An	China	49
33	WeChat	China	48
34	Bank of America	United States	48
35	Aramco	Saudi Arabia	47
36	Mercedes-Benz	Germany	47
37	Coca-Cola	United States	46
38	Hyundai Group	South Korea	46
39	Chase	United States	45
40	Visa	United States	44
41	BMW	Germany	44
42	Deloitte	United States	43
43	McDonald's	United States	43
44	Accenture	United States	42
45	NTT Group	Japan	42
46	Wells Fargo	United States	40
47	TSMC	Taiwan	39
48	Lowe's	United States	39
49	YouTube	United States	38
50	SAP	Germany	38

== Interbrand's Best Global Brands list (2025) ==
The 100 most valuable brands in 2025 according to Interbrand, the brand consultancy that founded the practice of brand valuation. Best Global Brands is the longest recorded longitudinal study of brand valuation.

Rank	Brand	Brand value (US$ billions)
1	Apple Inc.	470.9
2	Microsoft	388.5
3	Amazon.com	319.9
4	Google	317.1
5	Samsung	90.5
6	Toyota	74.2
7	Coca-Cola	60.1
8	Instagram	57.3
9	McDonald's	53.0
10	Mercedes-Benz	50.1
11	Cisco	48.7
12	Louis Vuitton	48.4
13	YouTube	48.4
14	BMW	46.8
15	NVIDIA	43.2
16	Oracle	42.1
17	Disney	41.4
18	SAP	41.3
19	Facebook	41.3
20	Adobe	41.0
21	Hermès	40.9
22	IBM	39.4
23	Nike	33.7
24	Chanel	30.5
25	Tesla	29.5
26	JPMorgan	29.2
27	Allianz	28.2
28	Netflix	28.0
29	Honda	24.8
30	Hyundai	24.6
31	BlackRock	23.7
32	Booking.com	23.5
33	Visa	23.0
34	Sony	22.3
35	IKEA	22.2
36	MasterCard	21.1
37	Accenture	20.9
38	Pepsi	20.3
39	Qualcomm	20.1
40	PayPal	19.8
41	Zara	19.4
42	Salesforce	19.2
43	AXA	18.3
44	GE Aerospace	18.2
45	Airbnb	17.9
46	UPS	17.9
47	UNIQLO	17.7
48	Siemens	17.6
49	adidas	17.4
50	LEGO	16.6
51	Dell Technologies	16.3
52	Audi	15.4
53	Nintendo	15.4
54	Ferrari	15.4
55	Goldman Sachs	15.3
56	Volkswagen	15.0
57	Porsche	15.0
58	Spotify	14.9
59	L'Oréal Paris	14.7
60	Pampers	13.8
61	eBay	13.7
62	Citi	13.1
63	Nescafé	12.9
64	Uber	12.8
65	Schneider Electric	12.7
66	Budweiser	12.0
67	HP	12.0
68	H&M	11.9
69	Gucci	11.6
70	Monster	11.5
71	Intel	11.5
72	HSBC	11.5
73	Cartier	11.2
74	Philips	10.6
75	LinkedIn	10.4
76	Colgate	10.4
77	Santander	10.3
78	Gillette	10.2
79	Nestlé	9.8
80	Corona	9.7
81	Xiaomi	9.5
82	Nissan	9.4
83	Dior	9.3
84	Caterpillar	9.2
85	Nasdaq	9.2
86	Prada	9.0
87	3M	8.9
88	John Deere	8.8
89	Kia	8.5
90	BYD	8.1
91	Danone	8.1
92	FedEx	7.8
93	Sephora	7.7
94	Tiffany & Co.	7.6
95	Pandora	7.6
96	Huawei	7.6
97	Range Rover	7.2
98	Nespresso	7.0
99	Shopify	6.9
100	DHL	6.9

== Most valuable brands over time ==
=== Top 10 since 2007 (Kantar) ===
The 10 most valuable brands every year since 2007 according to Kantar.

Year	1.	2.	3.	4.	5.	6.	7.	8.	9.	10.
2007	Google	General Electric	Microsoft	Coca-Cola	China Mobile	Marlboro	Walmart	Citigroup	IBM	Toyota
2008	Google	General Electric	Microsoft	Coca-Cola	China Mobile	IBM	Apple Inc.	McDonald's	Nokia	Marlboro
2009	Google	Microsoft	Coca-Cola	IBM	McDonald's	Apple Inc.	China Mobile	General Electric	Vodafone	Marlboro
2010	Google	IBM	Apple Inc.	Microsoft	Coca-Cola	McDonald's	Marlboro	China Mobile	General Electric	Vodafone
2011	Apple Inc.	Google	IBM	McDonald's	Microsoft	Coca-Cola	AT&T	Marlboro	China Mobile	General Electric
2012	Apple Inc.	IBM	Google	McDonald's	Microsoft	Coca-Cola	Marlboro	AT&T	Verizon	China Mobile
2013	Apple Inc.	Google	IBM	McDonald's	Coca-Cola	AT&T	Microsoft	Marlboro	Visa Inc.	China Mobile
2014	Google	Apple Inc.	IBM	Microsoft	McDonald's	Coca-Cola	Visa Inc.	AT&T	Marlboro	Amazon
2015	Apple Inc.	Google	Microsoft	IBM	Visa Inc.	AT&T	Verizon	Coca-Cola	McDonald's	Marlboro
2016	Google	Apple Inc.	Microsoft	AT&T	Facebook	Visa Inc.	Amazon	Verizon	McDonald's	IBM
2017	Google	Apple Inc.	Microsoft	Amazon	Facebook	AT&T	Visa Inc.	Tencent	IBM	McDonald's
2018	Google	Apple Inc.	Amazon	Microsoft	Tencent	Facebook	Visa Inc.	McDonald's	Alibaba Group	AT&T
2019	Amazon	Apple Inc.	Google	Microsoft	Visa Inc.	Facebook	Alibaba Group	Tencent	McDonald's	AT&T
2020	Amazon	Apple Inc.	Microsoft	Google	Visa Inc.	Alibaba Group	Tencent	Facebook	McDonald's	Mastercard
2021	Amazon	Apple Inc.	Google	Microsoft	Tencent	Facebook	Alibaba Group	Visa Inc.	McDonald's	Mastercard
2022	Apple Inc.	Google	Amazon	Microsoft	Tencent	McDonald's	Visa Inc.	Facebook	Alibaba Group	Louis Vuitton
2023	Apple Inc.	Google	Microsoft	Amazon	McDonald's	Visa Inc.	Tencent	Louis Vuitton	Mastercard	Coca-Cola
2024	Apple Inc.	Google	Microsoft	Amazon	McDonald's	Nvidia	Visa Inc.	Facebook	Oracle	Tencent
2025	Apple Inc.	Google	Microsoft	Amazon	Nvidia	Facebook	Instagram	McDonald's	Oracle	Visa Inc.

=== 2000 (Interbrand) ===
The 10 most valuable company brands in 2000 according to Interbrand.

Rank	Brand	Country	Brand value (US$ millions)	Rank	Brand	Country	Brand value (US$ millions)
1	Coca-Cola	United States	72,537	11	Marlboro	United States	22,110
2	Microsoft	United States	70,196	12	Mercedes-Benz	Germany	21,104
3	IBM	United States	53,183	13	Hewlett-Packard	United States	20,572
4	Intel	United States	39,048	14	Cisco	United States	20,067
5	Nokia	Finland	38,528	15	Toyota	Japan	18,823
6	General Electric	United States	38,127	16	Citi	United States	18,809
7	Ford	United States	36,368	17	Gillette	United States	17,358
8	Walt Disney	United States	33,553	18	Sony	Japan	16,409
9	McDonald's	United States	27,859	19	American Express	United States	16,122
10	AT&T	United States	25,548	20	Honda	Japan	15,244

== See also ==
- List of most valuable airlines brands
- List of largest companies by revenue
- List of largest corporate profits and losses
- List of largest employers
- List of largest United States–based employers globally
- List of public corporations by market capitalization (also dubbed "most valuable companies")
