= List of largest companies in Asia =

This list comprises the largest companies currently in Asia by revenue and market cap as of 2024.

== By revenue ==
Below are the 30 largest companies by revenue in 2023 (mostly for fiscal year 2022) according to the Fortune Global 500.

Rank	Name	Industry	Revenue	Profit	Employees	Headquarters
Rank	Name	Industry	USD millions		Employees	Headquarters
1	Saudi Aramco	Oil and gas	$603,651	$159,069	70,496	Saudi Arabia
2	State Grid Corporation of China	Electricity	$530,009	$8,192	870,287	China
3	China National Petroleum Corporation	Oil and gas	$483,019	$21,080	1,087,049	China
4	China Petrochemical Corporation	Oil and gas	$471,154	$9,657	527,487	China
5	Trafigura	Commodities	$318,476	$6,994	12,347	Singapore
6	China State Construction Engineering	Construction	$305,885	$4,234	382,492	China
7	Toyota	Automotive	$274,491	$18,110	375,235	Japan
8	Samsung Electronics	Electronics	$234,129	$42,398	270,372	South Korea
9	Foxconn	Electronics	$222,535	$4,751	767,062	Taiwan
10	Industrial and Commercial Bank of China	Financials	$214,766	$53,589	427,587	China
11	China Construction Bank	Financials	$202,753	$48,145	376,682	China
12	Agricultural Bank of China	Financials	$187,061	$38,524	452,258	China
13	Ping An Insurance	Financials	$181,566	$12,454	344,223	China
14	Sinochem	Chemicals	$173,834	–$1	220,760	China
15	China Railway Engineering Corporation	Construction	$171,669	$2,035	314,792	China
16	China National Offshore Oil Corporation	Oil and gas	$164,762	$16,988	81,775	China
17	China Railway Construction Corporation	Construction	$163,037	$1,800	342,098	China
18	Baowu	Steel	$161,698	$2,493	245,675	China
19	Mitsubishi Group	Conglomerate	$159,371	$8,723	79,706	Japan
20	JD.com	E-commerce	$155,533	$1,543	450,679	China
21	China Life Insurance Company	Insurance	$151,487	$6,859	180,619	China
22	China Mobile	Telecommunications	$139,597	$14,718	452,202	China
23	China Minmetals	Mining	$133,541	$877	183,298	China
24	Alibaba Group	Technology	$129,059	$10,625	235,216	China
25	Xiamen C & D	Logistics	$125,971	$454	40,959	China
26	Honda Motor	Automotive	$124,912	$4,813	197,039	Japan
27	Shandong Energy	Mining	$124,089	$33	232,841	China
28	China Resources	Conglomerate	$121,643	$4,662	379,944	China
29	China Energy Investment	Energy	$121,427	$5,699	310,753	China
30	China Southern Power Grid	Electricity	$113,674	$1,516	271,202	China

== By market value ==
Below are the 20 largest companies in Asia by market capitalization as of 5th January 2024.

Rank	Name	Industry	Market capitalization (USD billions)	Headquarters
1	Saudi Aramco	Oil and gas	2,083.70	Saudi Arabia
2	TSMC	Electronics	481.28	Taiwan
3	Samsung Electronics	Electronics	386.91	South Korea
4	Tencent	Technology	355.05	China
5	Kweichow Moutai	Beverages	297.91	China
6	Toyota	Automotive	251.20	Japan
7	ICBC	Banking	223.89	China
8	Reliance Industries	Conglomerate	211.76	India
9	PDD Holdings	E-commerce	201.21	China
10	Alibaba Group	Technology	183.48	China
11	PetroChina Company	Oil and gas	181.19	China
12	China Mobile	Telecommunications	178.24	China
13	Agricultural Bank of China	Banking	176.83	China
14	Tata Consultancy Services	Technology	162.98	India
15	HDFC Bank	Banking	152.69	India
16	Bank of China	Banking	150.71	China
17	China Construction Bank	Banking	148.88	China
18	Sony	Technology	114.35	Japan
19	MUFG	Finance	104.13	Japan
20	Keyence	Technology	103.01	Japan

== See also ==
- List of companies by revenue
- List of largest manufacturing companies by revenue
- List of largest employers
- List of companies by profit and loss
- List of public corporations by market capitalization
- Fortune Global 500
- Economy of Asia
