= List of largest financial services companies by revenue =

Company ranking

The following is a list of the world's largest publicly-traded financial services companies, ordered by annual sales for the latest Fiscal Year in millions of U.S. dollars according to the Fortune Global 500 (currently the top 50 public companies are included, while privately held companies are not included).

== 2025 ==
Rank	Company	Industry	Revenue (USD millions)	Net Income (USD millions)	Total Assets (USD billions)	Headquarters
1	Transamerica corporation	Insurance	245,510	42,521	873	United States
2	Ping An Insurance Group	Insurance	191,509	20,738	1,460	China
3	ICBC	Banking	182,794	45,783	5,110	China
4	China Construction Bank	Banking	172,000	39,282	4,311	China
5	Agricultural Bank of China	Banking	153,884	31,293	4,169	China
6	China Life Insurance	Insurance	144,589	4,648	776	China
7	Allianz	Insurance	136,173	7,756	1,297	Germany
8	Bank of China	Banking	134,045	27,952	3,739	China
9	JP Morgan Chase	Banking	129,503	29,131	3,386	United States
10	AXA	Insurance	128,011	3,605	984	France
11	Fannie Mae	Investment Services	106,437	11,805	3,985	United States
12	Life Insurance Corporation of India	Insurance	102,851	4,954	630	India
13	Generali Group	Insurance	97,128	1,987	667	Italy
14	Bank of America	Banking	93,753	17,894	2,819	United States
15	Citigroup	Banking	88,839	11,047	2,260	United States
16	People's Insurance Company	Insurance	84,290	2,903	192	China
17	Crédit Agricole	Banking	82,958	3,067	2,399	France
18	BNP Paribas	Banking	81,632	8,052	3,045	France
18	HSBC	Banking	134,901	23,533	3,038	United Kingdom
20	Wells Fargo	Banking	80,303	3,301	1,955	United States
21	State Farm	Insurance	78,898	3,738	299	United States
22	Nippon Life	Insurance	76,984	3,127	773	Japan
23	Munich Re	Insurance	74,074	1,379	364	Germany
24	Dai-ichi Life	Insurance	73,841	3,431	574	Japan
25	Banco Santander	Banking	73,630		1,845	Spain
27	Bank of Communications	Banking	67,605	11,409	1,639	China
28	Freddie Mac	Investment Services	66,228	7,326	2,627	United States
29	Legal & General Group	Insurance	63,324	2,061	779	United Kingdom
30	Brookfield Asset Management	Investment Services	62,752		343	Canada
31	Aviva	Insurance	62,579	3,588	655	United Kingdom
32	China Pacific Insurance	Insurance	61,185	3,562	271	China
33	China Merchants Bank	Banking	60,433	14,107	1,281	China
34	Zurich Insurance Group	Insurance	59,001	3,834	439	Switzerland
35	Manulife Financial	Insurance	58,840	4,377	691	Canada
36	Aegon	Insurance	58,221		543	Netherlands
37	Prudential Financial	Insurance	57,033		940	United States
38	Mitsubishi UFJ Financial Group	Banking	56,838	7,329	3,250	Japan
39	Prudential	Insurance	55,973	2,118	516	United Kingdom
40	StoneX Group Inc.	Investment Services	54,139	169	13	United States
41	Goldman Sachs	Investment Services	53,498	9,459	1,163	United States
42	Industrial Bank	Banking	53,313	9,655	1,209	China
43	Shanghai Pudong Development	Banking	52,628	8,443	1,219	China
44	Société Générale	Banking	52,068		1,789	France
45	Morgan Stanley	Investment Services	52,047	10,996	1,115	United States
46	State Bank of India	Banking	51,919	3,018	662	India
47	Tokio Marine Holdings	Insurance	51,516	1,526	232	Japan
48	AIA Group	Insurance	50,359	5,779	326	Hong Kong
49	China Minsheng Banking	Banking	49,076	4,972	1,065	China
50	Power Corporation of Canada	Insurance	48,183	1,525	493	Canada
51	Talanx	Insurance	46,788	766	221	Germany
52	Lloyds Banking Group	Banking	14,592	1,882	1,183	United Kingdom

== 2018 ==
The following is a list of the world's largest publicly traded financial services companies, ordered by annual sales for the latest Fiscal Year that ended March 31, 2018 or prior (all public companies with sales of $20 billion or more are included, while privately held companies are not included).

Rank	Company	Industry	Revenue (USD millions)	Net Income (USD millions)	Total Assets (USD billions)	Headquarters
1	Berkshire Hathaway	Conglomerate	247,500	4,020	708	United States
2	Ping An Insurance Group	Insurance	163,597	16,237	7,143	China
3	Allianz	Insurance	143,860	8,490	973	Germany
4	AXA	Insurance	113,130	2,310	1,008	France
5	JP Morgan Chase	Banking	105,486	30,709	2,687	United States
6	ICBC	Banking	105,400	44,260	4,027	China
7	China Construction Bank	Banking	94,987	37,200	3,376	China
8	China Life Insurance	Insurance	92,710	22,040	362	China
9	Bank of America	Banking	91,240	28,140	2,325	United States
10	Agricultural Bank of China	Banking	87,600	29,500	3,287	China
11	Wells Fargo	Banking	86,410	22,390	1,895	United States
12	HSBC	Banking	86,131	15,020	2,715	United Kingdom
13	Generali Group	Insurance	75,460	2,310	587	Italy
14	People's Insurance Company	Insurance	75,377	1,952	146	China
15	Bank of China	Banking	73,230	27,970	3,092	China
16	Citigroup	Banking	72,850	16,672	1,917	United States
17	MetLife	Insurance	67,940	4,982	686	United States
18	Bank of Communications	Banking	65,644	11,131	1,386	China
19	Dai-ichi Life	Insurance	64,794	2,029	347	Japan
20	Aegon	Insurance	64,223	2,618	886	Netherlands
21	Banco Bradesco	Banking	61,540	5,222	361	Brazil
22	Prudential Financial	Insurance	59,689	7,863	832	United States
23	Legal & General Group	Insurance	55,999	2,701	493	United Kingdom
24	China Merchants Bank	Banking	55,063	12,179	981	China
25	Munich Re	Insurance	54,090	2,530	309	Germany
26	China Pacific Insurance	Insurance	53,572	2,724		China
27	Banco Santander	Banking	53,340	8,600		Spain
28	Shanghai Pudong Development	Banking	50,545	8,453		China
29	Morgan Stanley	Investment Services	50,193	8,748		United States
30	MS&AD Insurance Group	Insurance	49,609	1,738		Japan
31	Tokio Marine Holdings	Insurance	49,395	2,476		Japan
32	American International Group	Insurance	47,390	-0.006		United States
33	Zurich Insurance Group	Insurance	47,180	3,716		Switzerland
34	BNP Paribas	Banking	46,840	8,820		France
35	CNP Assurances	Insurance	45,461	1,612		France
36	Sberbank	Banking	44,898	13,268		Russia
37	Royal Bank of Canada	Banking	44,609	9,635		Canada
38	Banco do Brasil	Banking	43,332	3,782		Brazil
39	China Minsheng Banking	Banking	43,298	7,370		China
40	American Express	Financial Services	43,281	6,921		United States
41	Unibanco	Banking	42,700	6,500		Brazil
42	Talanx	Insurance	42,390	829		Germany
43	Goldman Sachs	Investment Services	42,254	4,286		United States
44	Mitsubishi UFJ Financial Group	Banking	41,280	9,820		Japan
45	TD Bank Group	Banking	41,198	8,751		Canada
46	Allstate	Insurance	39,815	2,252		United States
47	State Bank of India	Banking	39,090	120		India
48	Intesa Sanpaolo	Banking	39,050	4,780		Italy
49	Power Corporation of Canada	Insurance	37,118	1,033		Canada
50	Swiss Re	Insurance	37,047	462		Switzerland
51	Mizuho Financial Group	Banking	35,406	871		Japan
52	Sumitomo Mitsui Financial Group	Banking	35,170	8,207		Japan
53	Credit Suisse Group	Investment Services	34,284	2,070		Switzerland
54	Crédit Agricole	Banking	33,747	5,351		France
55	Commonwealth Bank	Banking	33,186	7,228		Australia
56	Sompo Holdings	Insurance	32,857	1,322		Japan
57	Prudential	Insurance	32,553	4,035		United Kingdom
58	Standard Life	Insurance	32,114	868		United Kingdom
59	Bank of Nova Scotia	Banking	31,589	6,642		Canada
60	The Travelers Companies	Insurance	30,282	2,523		United States
61	UBS	Investment Services	30,210	4,510		Switzerland
62	Manulife Financial	Insurance	30,070	3,703		Canada
63	Royal Bank of Scotland	Banking	28,984	2,218		United Kingdom
64	Barclays	Banking	27,865	3,126		United Kingdom
65	Deutsche Bank	Banking	27,492	378		Germany
66	Mapfre	Insurance	27,423	624		Spain
67	ANZ	Banking	27,147	4,863		Australia
68	Société Générale	Banking	26,380	3,780		France
69	BBVA	Banking	26,261	2,930		Spain
70	Onex	Investment Services	25,606	-0.663		Canada
71	Lloyds Banking Group	Banking	25,251	5,737		United Kingdom
72	Aviva	Insurance	91,840	3,481	496	United Kingdom
73	FNMA (Fannie Mae)	Investment Services	21,900	16,000		United States
74	Aflac	Insurance	21,758	2,920		United States
75	UniCredit	Banking	21,070	5,212		Italy
76	Standard Chartered	Banking	20,976	1,109		United Kingdom
77	Old Mutual	Investment Services	20,923	938		United Kingdom
78	Freddie Mac	Investment Services	15,380	9,235		United States
79	Westpac Banking Group	Banking	14,710	5,412		Australia
80	National Australia Bank	Banking	12,770	3,713		Australia

== See also ==
- List of largest manufacturing companies by revenue
- List of largest oil and gas companies by revenue
- List of largest United States–based employers globally
- List of largest companies by revenue
- List of public corporations by market capitalization
- List of largest corporate profits and losses
- Forbes Global 2000
- List of wealthiest religious organizations
