= List of largest companies in Southeast Asia by revenue =

This list comprises the largest companies by revenue in Southeast Asia as of 2025, according to the ranking of the largest 500 companies in Southeast Asia by Fortune magazine.

== 2025 Fortune Southeast Asia 500 List ==
Below are the 50 largest companies by revenue in 2025 (mostly for fiscal year 2024).

Rank	Name	Headquarters	Country	Revenue (million $)	Profit (million $)	Employees	Industry
1.	Trafigura	Singapore	Singapore	243,202	2,772	13,086	Commodity trading
2.	PTT Public Company	Bangkok	Thailand	87,639	2,554	30,251	Oil & natural gas
3.	Pertamina	Jakarta	Indonesia	75,327	3,126	43,998	Oil & natural gas
4.	Wilmar International	Singapore	Singapore	67,379	1,170	100,000	Agri-business
5.	Olam International	Singapore	Singapore	42,028	64	65,780	Agri-business
6.	Perusahaan Listrik Negara	Jakarta	Indonesia	34,437	1,118	51,435	Utilities
7.	DBS Group	Singapore	Singapore	29,037	8,448	41,354	Banks
8.	CP All	Bangkok	Thailand	28,012	719	204,701	Conglomerate
9.	San Miguel Corporation	Manila	Philippines	27,500	−129	10,138	Consumer goods
10.	Flex	Singapore	Singapore	25,813	838	147,979	Technology
11.	Petrovietnam	Hanoi	Vietnam	22,297	1,159	55,000	Oil & Natural Gas
12.	United Overseas Bank	Singapore	Singapore	20,864	4,524	32,087	Banks
13.	Oversea-Chinese Banking	Singapore	Singapore	20,328	5,678	33,319	Banks
14.	Bank Rakyat Indonesia	Jakarta	Indonesia	16,685	3,798	81,848	Banks
15.	Sea Limited	Singapore	Singapore	16,820	444	80,700	Technology
16.	Charoen Pokphand Foods	Bangkok	Thailand	16,469	555	132,739	Consumer goods
17.	Bangchak	Bangkok	Thailand	16,329	62	1,368	Energy
18.	Indorama Ventures	Bangkok	Thailand	15,480	−546	28,154	Chemicals
19.	Maybank	Kuala Lumpur	Malaysia	15,078	2,206	44,117	Banks
20.	Singapore Airlines	Singapore	Singapore	14,602	2,076	20,453	Airlines
21.	Siam Cement	Bangkok	Thailand	14,496	179	53,730	Construction
22.	Sime Darby	Kuala Lumpur	Malaysia	14,308	705	31,448	Conglomerate
23.	Bank Mandiri	Jakarta	Indonesia	13,049	3,522	36,700	Banks
24.	Tenaga Nasional	Kuala Lumpur	Malaysia	12,408	1,028	34,939	Utilities
25.	SM Investments	Pasay City	Philippines	11,430	1,442	141,366	Conglomerate
26.	Petrolimex	Hanoi	Vietnam	11,337	115	25,967	Oil & Gas
27.	Golden Agri-Resources	Singapore	Singapore	10,910	365	100,100	Agri-business
28.	Singapore Telecom	Singapore	Singapore	10,572	3,002	22,700	Telecommunications
29.	Thai Beverage	Bangkok	Thailand	9,539	762	51,719	Beverages
30.	Telkom Indonesia	Bandung	Indonesia	9,470	1,493	21,673	Telecommunications
31.	Kasikornbank	Bangkok	Thailand	9,343	1,378	31,739	Banks
32.	CIMB Group	Kuala Lumpur	Malaysia	8,457	1,690	33,512	Banks
33.	ST Engineering	Singapore	Singapore	8,439	526	27,836	Technology
34.	Petronas Dagangan	Kuala Lumpur	Malaysia	8,300	238	1,355	Oil & Natural Gas
35.	Manila Electric	Pasig	Philippines	8,211	801	19,549	Utilities
36.	Bank Central Asia	Jakarta	Indonesia	7,630	3,462	25,609	Banks
37.	Vingroup	Hanoi	Vietnam	7,548	475	67,342	Conglomerate
38.	Bangkok Bank	Bangkok	Thailand	7,541	1,282	18,746	Banks
39.	Sumber Alfaria Trijaya	Tangerang	Indonesia	7,465	199	95,648	Retail
40.	Indofood	Jakarta	Indonesia	7,311	546	95,606	Consumer goods
41.	Central Retail Corporation	Bangkok	Thailand	6,925	231	33,274	Retail
42.	Seatrium	Singapore	Singapore	6,908	117	23,829	Shipping
43.	BIDV	Hanoi	Vietnam	6,845	1,004	28,998	Banks
44.	Petronas Chemical Group	Kuala Lumpur	Malaysia	6,708	257	6,729	Oil & natural gas
45.	Agribank	Hanoi	Vietnam	6,652	876	42,278	Banks
46.	YTL Corporation	Kuala Lumpur	Malaysia	6,498	456	12,090	Conglomerate
47.	Ayala Corporation	Makati	Philippines	6,460	734	31,139	Conglomerate
48.	PTG Energy	Bangkok	Thailand	6,404	29	25,755	Oil & natural gas
49.	SCB X	Bangkok	Thailand	6,387	1,246	31,912	Finance
50.	JG Summit Holdings	Pasig	Philippines	6,240	372	22,201	Conglomerate

== See also ==
- List of companies by revenue
- List of largest companies in Asia
- Fortune Global 500
- Economy of ASEAN
