= List of wealthiest religious organizations =

The following is a list of the world's wealthiest religious organizations.

== List ==
Organization	Worth (billion USD)	Country	Religion/belief	Notes
The Church of Jesus Christ of Latter-day Saints	293	United States	Mormonism	Includes everything from investments, operating assets (ecclesiastical buildings) and real estate, mostly from USA.
Setad (Execution of Imam Khomeini's Order)	95 to 135	Iran	Shiite Islam	
Catholic Church in Germany	47.24 to 265.62	Germany	Catholicism	Some sources suggest a value as high as $265.62 billion, while others put it closer to $47.24 billion due to limited public data on the Church's finances. Former totals the value of land, real estate, investments and holdings of the Catholic Church and its institutions.
Tirumala Tirupati Devasthanams (TTD)	31.11	India	Hinduism	Holdings reportedly include 10.25 tonnes of gold deposits in banks, 2.5 tonnes of gold jewelry, $1.9 billion in various banks and 960 properties across India.
Muhammadiyah	26.25	Indonesia	Sunni Islam	Roughly converted from 400 trillion rupiah as of 2023; mostly in the form of land and buildings (hospitals, mosques, schools, & universities).
Catholic Church in Australia	23.25	Australia	Catholicism	Extrapolated figure from calculating assets and investments in the state of Victoria.
Catholic Church in France	23.0	France	Catholicism	
Plymouth Brethren Christian Church	22 to 79	United States	Evangelical Christianity	
Seventh-day Adventist Church	15.6	United States	Adventism	As of 1998.
Church of England	13.84	United Kingdom	Anglican	Endowment funds.
Church of Sweden	11.41	Sweden	Lutheran	FY2012. Largely of assets that are in forests, buildings and securities. Another 3.07 billion as annual income.
Trinity Church	8.9	United States	Anglican	2025 Updated Parish Financial Statement
The Episcopal Church	7.4	United States	Anglican	2025 Parochial Report. $5.6 billion in endowments and $1.8 billion in investments across its 6,673 parishes and missions.
Tzu Chi Foundation	4.3	Taiwan	Buddhism	
Opus Dei (part of the Catholic Church)	3.0	Italy	Catholicism	
Church of Scientology	2.0	United States	Scientology	
Holy See (Vatican)	Incalculable	Vatican City	Catholicism	Not available due to widespread properties globally.

== See also ==
=== Individuals ===
- Forbes list of billionaires
- List of wealthiest families
- List of wealthiest animals

=== Businesses ===
- List of largest church buildings
- List of largest companies by revenue
- List of largest employers
- List of largest corporate profits and losses
- List of public corporations by market capitalization
- List of most indebted companies
- List of largest manufacturing companies by revenue
- List of largest financial services companies by revenue
- List of largest companies in Europe by revenue
