= List of largest internet companies =

Amazon is the Internet company with the highest revenue, at $469.82 billion in 2021.

This is a list of internet companies by revenue and market capitalization. The list is limited to dot-com companies, defined as a company that does the majority of its business on the internet, with annual revenues exceeding US$1 billion. It excludes internet service providers or other information technology companies. For a more general list of technology companies, see list of largest technology companies by revenue. This list is incomplete and does not include some dot-com companies acquired by incumbent brick and mortar firms to expand the distribution channels.

== List ==
List of the largest internet companies
Rank	Company	Revenue USD billions	F.Y.	Employees	Market cap. USD billions	Headquarters	Founded	Industry	Refs
1	Amazon	$620.12	2021	1,608,000	$2,490	(United States) Seattle	1994	Ecommerce	
2	Alphabet	$339.85	2021	156,500	$2,270	(United States) Mountain View	1998	Internet	
3	JD.com	$260.4	2021	385,357	$390.35	(China) Beijing	1998	Ecommerce	
4	Meta	$156.22	2021	71,970	$1,803	(United States) Menlo Park	2004	Social Media	
5	Alibaba	$109.48	2021	251,462	$330.67	(China) Hangzhou	1999	Ecommerce	
6	Tencent	$87.85	2021	112,771	$562.84	(China) Shenzhen	1998	Internet	
7	ByteDance	$58	2021	110,000	$353	(China) Beijing	2012	Social Media	
8	Netflix	$39	2021	12,135	$434.46	(United States) Los Gatos	1997	Entertainment	
9	Meituan	$27.77	2021	100,033	$177.34	(China) Beijing	2010	Ecommerce	
10	PayPal	$25.37	2021	30,900	$220.26	(United States) San Jose	1998	Financial Services	
11	Wildberries	$22.26	2022	154,000	$14.52	(Russia) Moscow	2004	Ecommerce	
12	Salesforce.com	$21.25	2021	49,000	$212.34	(United States) San Francisco	1999	Software	
13	Suning.com	$21.09	2021	69,398	$13.47	(China) Nanjing	1990	Ecommerce	
14	Ozon	$20.068	2023	40,000	$7.8	(Russia) Moscow	1998	Ecommerce	
15	Baidu	$19.54	2021	45,500	$51.77	(China) Beijing	2000	Internet	
16	Otto Group	$18.27	2020	49,895	-	(Germany) Hamburg	2005	Ecommerce	
17	Block	$17.66	2021	8,521	$74.50	(United States) San Francisco	2009	Financial Services	
18	Uber	$17.46	2021	29,300	$81.34	(United States) San Francisco	2009	Transportation	
19	Adobe	$15.78	2021	25,988	$269.35	(United States) San Jose	1982	Software	
20	Shein	$15.70	2021	10,000	$47	(China) Nanjing	2008	Ecommerce	
21	Rakuten	$15.30	2021	23,841	$15.12	(Japan) Tokyo	1997	Ecommerce	
22	NetEase	$13.75	2021	32,064	$67.76	(China) Hangzhou	1997	Internet	
23	Wayfair	$13.71	2021	16,681	$19.86	(United States) Boston	2005	Ecommerce	
24	Kwai	$12.75	2021	28,098	$38.74	(China) Beijing	2011	Social Media	
25	Spotify	$11.44	2021	8,230	$44.82	(Sweden) Stockholm	2006	Audio Streaming	
26	eBay	$10.42	2021	10,800	$41.62	(United States) San Jose	1995	Ecommerce	
27	Bloomberg L.P.	$10	2019	20,000	-	(United States) New York City	1981	Financial Services	
28	Zalando	$7.98	2020	14,194	$27.37	(Germany) Berlin	2008	Ecommerce	
29	Yahoo	$7.4	2020	10,030	-	(United States) Sunnyvale	2017	Search engine	
30	Chewy	$7.15	2020	18,500	$33.05	(United States) Dania Beach	2011	Ecommerce	
31	Yandex	$6.96	2022	11,864	$21.65	(Russia) Moscow	1997	Internet	
32	Booking	$6.79	2020	20,300	$96.35	(United States) Norwalk	1996	Travel	
33	Coupang	$6.23	2019	10,000	-	(South Korea) Seoul (United States) Delaware	2010	Ecommerce	
34	Naver	$5.7	2019	15,148	$51.23	(South Korea) Seongnam	1999	Internet	
35	Carvana	$5.59	2020	10,400	$45.65	(United States) Tempe	2013	Ecommerce	
36	Epic Games	$5.4	2019	1,000	-	(United States) Cary	1999	Video Games	
37	Expedia	$5.2	2020	19,100	$25.26	(United States) Bellevue	1996	Travel	
38	ServiceNow	$4.52	2020	13,096	$107.55	(United States) Santa Clara	2004	Software	
39	ASOS.com	$4.52	2020	3,824	$7.1	(United Kingdom) London	2000	Ecommerce	
40	Sea Limited	$4.38	2020	33,800	$128.07	Singapore	2009	Ecommerce	
41	Pinduoduo	$4.33	2019	5,828	$167.04	(China) Shanghai	2015	Ecommerce	
42	Workday	$4.32	2020	12,500	$61.44	(United States) Pleasanton	2005	Software	
43	Bet365	$3.89	2019	4,708	-	(United Kingdom) Stoke-on-Trent	2000	Online Gambling	
44	Twitter	$3.72	2020	5,500	$51.36	(United States) San Francisco	2006	Social Media	
45	Compass, Inc.	$3.72	2020	18,000	-	(United States) New York	2010	Real estate broker	
46	Kakao	$3.71	2020	8,602 (2019)	$46.02	(South Korea) Jeju City	2010	Internet	
47	Stripe	$3.45	2018	2,500	-	(United States) San Francisco (Republic of Ireland) Dublin	2010	Financial Services	
48	Airbnb	$3.38	2020	5,597	$103.86	(United States) San Francisco	2008	Lodging	
49	Zillow	$3.34	2020	5,249	$9.59	(United States) Seattle	2006	Real Estate	
50	GoDaddy	$3.32	2020	6,621	$14.35	(United States) Scottsdale	2004	Web Hosting	
51	Akamai Technologies	$3.2	2020	8,368	$17.36	(United States) Cambridge, Massachusetts	1998	Cybersecurity	
52	wework	$3.2	2020	6,000		(United States) New York City	2010	Real estate technology	
53	Infor	$3.2	2020	18,000	-	(United States) New York	2002	Software as service	
54	Shopify	$2.93	2020	7,000	$133.22	(Canada) Ottawa	2004	Ecommerce	
55	DoorDash	$2.89	2020	3,886	$46.27	(United States) San Francisco	2013	Delivery	
56	Trip.com	$2.81	2020	33,400	$23.03	(China) Shanghai	1999	Travel	
57	Rackspace	$2.71	2020	7,200	$20.00	(United States) San Antonio, Texas	1998	Information Technology	
58	EPAM Systems	$2.66	2019	36,50	$31.10	(United States) Newtown, Pennsylvania	1993	Information Technology	
59	Zoom Video	$2.65	2020	4,422	$96.43	(United States) San Jose, California	2011	Internet Telecommunication	
60	Opendoor	$2.58	2020	1,048	$10.78	(United States) San Francisco	2011	Internet Real Estate	
61	Beyond	$2.55	2020	1,750	$2.89	(United States) Midvale	1999	Ecommerce	
62	Travelport	$2.55	2018	3,700	-	(United States) Cumberland, Georgia	2001	Travel	
63	Wish	$2.54	2020	875	$8.09	(United States) San Francisco	2008	Ecommerce	
64	The Stars Group	$2.53	2019	4,591	$7.49	(Canada) Toronto	2001	Online Gambling	
65	Snap	$2.51	2020	3,863	$86.04	(United States) Santa Monica	2011	Social Media	
66	Coolblue	$2.4	2020	6,361	-	(Netherlands) Rotterdam	1999	Ecommerce	
67	Match Group	$2.39	2020	1,900	$38.59	(United States) Dallas	2006	Online Dating	
68	Lyft	$2.36	2020	4,675	$20.06	(United States) San Francisco	2010	Transportation	
69	Fanatics	$2.3	2018	1,800	-	(United States) Jacksonville	1995	Ecommerce	
70	58.com	$2.23	2019	21,743	$9.69	(China) Beijing	2005	Online Directory	
71	Copart	$2.21	2020	7,600	$29.04	(United States) Dallas	1982	Automotive	
72	CDK Global	$2.19	2020	9,000	$5.3	(United States) Illinois	2014	Automotive Ecommerce	
73	Sina Corp	$2.16	2019	8,300	$2.58	(China) Beijing	1998	Internet	
74	Newegg	$2.08	2019	3,700	-	(United States) City of Industry	2003	Ecommerce	
75	Instacart	$2.0	2017	5,755	-	(United States) San Francisco	2012	Hyperlocal Delivery	
76	Shutterfly	$2.0	2018	7,500	-	(United States) Redwood City, California	1998	Photography	
77	BMC Software	$2.0	2019	6,000	-	(United States) Houston, Texas	1980	software as service	
78	Zynga	$1.97	2020	2,245	$11.53	(United States) San Francisco	1998	Video Games	
79	Roblox Corporation	$1.91	2021	1,600	$16.17	(United States) San Mateo	2004	Online gaming	
80	Dropbox	$1.91	2020	2,760	$10.47	(United States) San Francisco	2007	Cloud Storage	
81	B2W	$1.86	2020	9,050 (2019)	$6.90	(Brazil) Rio de Janeiro	2006	Ecommerce	
82	Grubhub	$1.82	2020	2,841	$6.62	(United States) Chicago	2001	Online Food Ordering	
83	Twilio	$1.76	2020	4,629	$63.71	(United States) San Francisco	2008	Telecommunication	
84	Stitch Fix	$1.71	2020	8,000	$4.66	(United States) San Francisco	2009	Personalized Services	
85	Etsy	$1.7	2020	1,414	$25.3	(United States) New York	2002	Ecommerce	
86	Pinterest	$1.69	2020	2,545	$45.73	(United States) San Francisco	2009	Social Media	
87	Farfetch	$1.67	2020	5,441	$16.96	(United Kingdom) London (Portugal) Lisbon	2007	Ecommerce	
88	Klarna	$1.60	2021	4,789	$45.6	(Sweden) Stockholm	2005	Financial Services	
89	Carsome	$1.50	2022	4,000 (2022)	$2.00	(Malaysia) Kuala Lumpur,	2015	Internet	
90	J2 Global	$1.49	2020	2,400 (2019)	$5.43	(United States) Los Angeles,	1995	Internet	
91	ANGI Homeservices Inc.	$1.47	2020	5,100	$7.92	(United States) Denver	1995	Internet	
92	DocuSign	$1.45	2021	5,630	$41.13	(United States) San Francisco	2003	Software	
93	Groupon	$1.42	2020	4,159	$1.30	(United States) Chicago	2005	Ecommerce	
94	Vroom.com	$1.36	2020	944	$5.89	(United States) New York City	2003	Ecommerce	
95	VK (formerly Mail.ru)	$1.33	2020	6,334 (2019)	$5.17	(Russia) Moscow	1998	Internet	
96	Sabre Corporation	$1.33	2020	7,531	$4.88	(United States) Southlake	1994	Travel	
97	Kaplan, Inc.	$1.31	2020	5,500	-	(United States) Fort Lauderdale, Florida	1938	Education	
98	Endurance International Group	$1.3	2019	2,500	$4.00	(United States) Burlington, Massachusetts	1998	Internet	
99	GoTo	$1.3	2022	5,000	$32.00	(Indonesia) Jakarta	2021	Transportation, Ecommerce	
100	Exela Technologies	$1.29	2020	22,000	$1.2	(United States) Irving, Texas	2017	Automation	
101	Verisign	$1.27	2020	909	$23.94	(United States) Reston	1995	Internet	
102	Flexport	$1.27	2020	2,000		(United States) San Francisco	2013	Software freight forwarding	
103	LogMeIn	$1.26	2019	3,974	$4.21	(United States) Boston	2003	Software	
104	Unity Technologies	$1.2	2021	5,500	$12.73	(United States) San Francisco	2004	Software gaming	
105	Blue Yonder	$1.1	2021	5,500	-	(United States) Scottsdale, Arizona	1985	Software	
106	Craigslist	$1.0	2018	1,000	-	(United States) San Francisco	1995	Classifieds	
107	Grab	$1.0	2018	6,000	-	Singapore	2012	Transportation	

== See also ==
- List of largest technology companies by revenue
- List of largest manufacturing companies by revenue
- List of largest companies by revenue
- List of largest United States–based employers globally
- List of largest employers
