= Economy of the United States by sector =

The economy of the United States is divided into economic sectors. The North American Industry Classification System (NAICS) was developed in 1997 and is used by the United States Census Bureau and U.S. Securities Exchange Commission (SEC).

== Economic Census ==
The United States Census Bureau currently conducts a comprehensive Economic Census every five years. The results of this survey are tabulated according to the NAICS and provide statistics about the U.S. economy. The most recent data are from the 2022 Economic Census. First Look national-level estimates at the 2- and 3-digit NAICS level were released in January 2024; detailed data for nearly every 2- through 6-digit NAICS code at varying geographic levels followed on a flow basis and were completed thereafter.

== Comparative statistics ==
The Census Bureau releases sector-by-sector statistics on the number of establishments, total business activity, annual payroll, and number of paid employees. A standardized classification of the economy into sectors makes it possible to compare census results over time. However, to reflect the evolving nature of the economy, the NAICS is updated every five years. Therefore, when comparing different censuses, a particular NAICS basis is usually specified. The following data are based on a comparison of the 2007 and 2002 censuses using the 2002 NAICS basis and an older comparison of the 1997 and 2002 censuses using the older 1997 NAICS basis. Thus, (*) the 1997 data are based on a slightly different classification than the 2007 and 2002 data.

Number of establishments by sector in the United States economy in 1997, 2002, and 2007.

Value of sales, shipments, receipts, revenue, or business done by sector in the United States economy in 1997, 2002, and 2007.

Annual payroll by sector in the United States economy in 1997, 2002, and 2007.

Employees by sector in the United States economy in 1997, 2002, and 2007.

Annual payroll per employee by sector in the United States economy in 1997, 2002, and 2007.

== 2002 statistics ==
Sectors of the U.S. Economy in 2002 - firms with payroll - All Sector Totals

Sector	Establishments	Sales, receipts, or shipments ($1,000)	Annual payroll ($1,000)	Paid employees
Mining	24,087	182,911,093	21,173,895	477,840
Utilities	17,103	398,907,044	42,417,830	663,044
Construction	710,307	1,196,555,587	254,292,144	7,193,069
Manufacturing	350,828	3,916,136,712	576,170,541	14,699,536
Wholesale trade	435,521	4,634,755,112	259,653,080	5,878,405
Retail trade	1,114,637	3,056,421,997	302,113,581	14,647,675
Transportation & warehousing	199,618	382,152,040	115,988,733	3,650,859
Information	137,678	891,845,956	194,670,163	3,736,061
Finance & insurance	440,268	2,803,854,868	377,790,172	6,578,817
Real estate & rental & leasing	322,815	335,587,706	60,222,584	1,948,657
Professional, scientific, & technical services	771,305	886,801,038	376,090,052	7,243,505
Management of companies & enterprises	49,308	107,064,264	178,996,060	2,605,292
Administrative & support & waste management & remediation service	350,583	432,577,580	206,439,329	8,741,854
Educational services	49,319	30,690,707	10,164,378	430,164
Health care & social assistance	704,526	1,207,299,734	495,845,829	15,052,255
Arts, entertainment, & recreation	110,313	141,904,109	45,169,117	1,848,674
Accommodation & food services	565,590	449,498,718	127,554,483	10,120,951
Other services (except public administration)	537,576	307,049,461	82,954,939	3,475,310
Totals	6,891,382	21,362,013,726	3,727,706,910	108,991,968

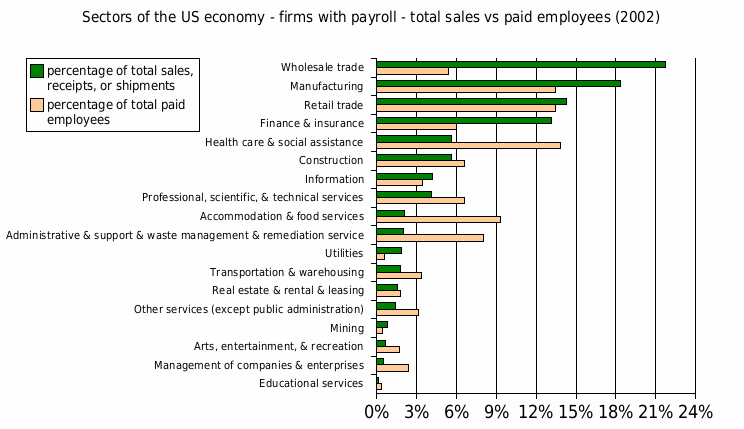
Sales and employees by sector within the United States economy in 2002.

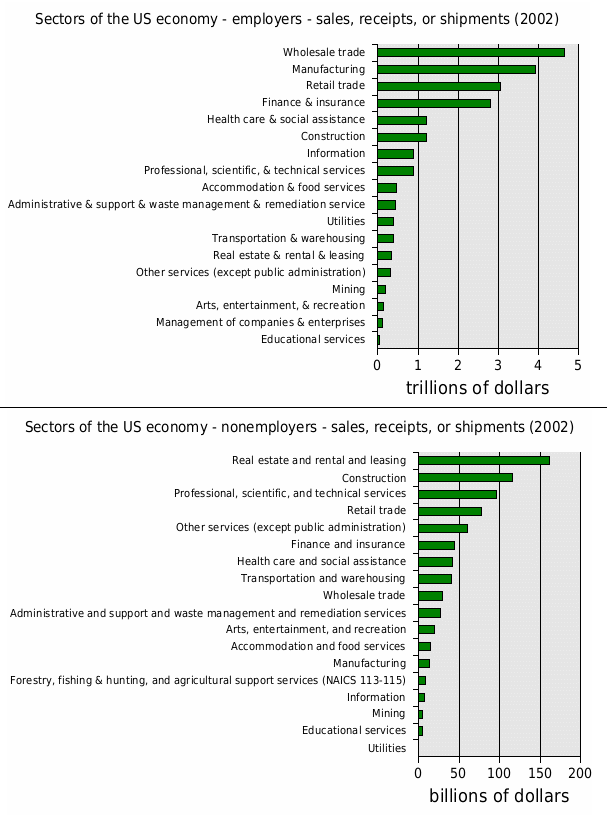
Sectors of the US economy ranked by number of sales, receipts, or shipments in the year 2002. Includes both employers and nonemployers

=== 2022 statistics ===
According to First Look estimates from the 2022 Economic Census (firms with paid employees), the United States had just over 8 million establishments, which employed 140 million people and paid $8.6 trillion in annual payroll. These figures compare with 7.6 million establishments in 2017 and 7.1 million in 2012.

== See also ==
- Economy of the United States
- List of largest United States–based employers globally
