= List of largest employers =

== Largest employers ==
Below is the list of largest employers including government-owned companies and institutions in 2022 (various sources).

Rank	Employer	Country	Employees (millions)	State-owned	Ref
1	Ministry of Defence (India)	India	2.99	Yes	
2	United States Department of Defense	United States	2.91	Yes	
3	People's Liberation Army	China	2.55	Yes	
4	Walmart	United States	2.30	No	
5	Amazon	United States	1.61	No	
6	China National Petroleum Corporation	China	1.45	Yes	
7	National Health Service	United Kingdom	1.38	Yes	
8	Foxconn	Taiwan	1.29	No	
9	Indian Railways	India	1.21	Yes	
10	Tata Group	India	1.15	No	

== Fortune Global 500 ==
Following is the list of Fortune Global 500 companies providing the most jobs worldwide, according to a list published in 2023 by Fortune magazine.

Figures appear to disagree with source, and are not in descending order of size.

Rank	Employer	Country	Employees (millions)	State-owned
1	Walmart	United States	2.21	No
2	Amazon	United States	1.61	No
3	State Grid Corporation of China	China	1.36	Yes
4	China National Petroleum Corporation	China	1.09	Yes
5	BYD Company	China	0.90	No
6	Accenture	Ireland	0.8	No
7	Foxconn	Taiwan	0.76	No
8	China Post	China	0.75	Yes
9	Volkswagen Group	Germany	0.68	Partially
10	United States Postal Service	United States	0.63	Yes

Note: The country shown appears to be where the company is based, and not necessarily where all the employees are based.

== See also ==
- Fortune Global 500
- Forbes Global 2000
- List of multinational corporations
- List of largest European manufacturing companies by revenue
- List of largest financial services companies by revenue
- List of the largest software companies
- List of largest Internet companies
- List of largest technology companies by revenue
- List of private-equity firms
- List of largest companies by revenue
- List of public corporations by market capitalization
- List of largest corporate profits and losses
- Lists of occupations
- List of types of tradesman
- Lists of companies – company-related list articles on Wikipedia
- List of largest United States–based employers globally
- List of wealthiest religious organizations
