= List of public corporations by market capitalization =

The following is a list of publicly traded companies, that have the largest market capitalization or "market value". Most or all of these companies would be categorized as megacap stocks.

Market capitalization is calculated by multiplying the share price on a selected day and the number of outstanding shares on that day. The list is expressed in USD billions, using exchange rates from the selected day to convert other currencies.

== Trillion-dollar companies ==
The table below lists all companies that have ever had a market capitalization of $1 trillion or more, their peak value, and the date on which their market cap first exceeded each milestone.

Company	Country	Peak value (in billions of dollars)		Peak value date	When first passed					Ref.
Company	Country	Nominal	Inflation- adjusted	Peak value date	$1 trillion	$2 trillion	$3 trillion	$4 trillion	$5 trillion	Ref.
Nvidia	(United States)	5,777	5,777	6 Oct 2026	30 May 2023	23 Feb 2024	5 Jun 2024	9 Jul 2025	29 Oct 2025	
Apple	(United States)	5,177	5,177	11 Nov 2026	2 Aug 2018	19 Aug 2020	3 Jan 2022	28 Oct 2025	28 Jul 2026	
Alphabet	(United States)	4,230	4,230	2 Feb 2026	16 Jan 2020	8 Nov 2021	15 Sep 2025	12 Jan 2026	—	
Microsoft	(United States)	4,190	4,190	31 Jul 2025	25 Apr 2019	22 Jun 2021	24 Jan 2024	31 Jul 2025	—	
Amazon	(United States)	3,055	3,055	3 Aug 2026	4 Sep 2018	26 Jun 2024	3 Aug 2026	—	—	
Saudi Aramco	(Saudi Arabia)	2,520	2,754	10 May 2022	12 Dec 2018	11 Dec 2019	—	—	—	
TSMC	(Taiwan)	2,240	2,240	17 Aug 2026	17 Oct 2024	24 Feb 2026	—	—	—	(Note: On 8 July 2024, TSMC's American depository receipt (ADR) shares on the New York Stock Exchange briefly crossed the $1 trillion milestone due to the ratio of ADRs to ordinary shares listed in Taiwan.)
Meta	(United States)	2,180	2,180	15 Aug 2025	28 Jun 2021	15 Aug 2025	—	—	—	(Note: Meta was formerly Facebook Inc. and traded as Facebook, Inc. at the time it first reached a $1tn capitalization.)
SpaceX	(United States)	2,440	2,440	19 Jun 2026	12 Jun 2026	12 Jun 2026	—	—	—	
Broadcom	(United States)	2,001	2,001	25 Apr 2026	13 Dec 2024	22 Apr 2026	—	—	—	
Tesla	(United States)	1,707	1,707	30 Jan 2026	25 Oct 2021	—	—	—	—	
Berkshire Hathaway	(United States)	1,192	1,192	3 May 2025	28 Aug 2024	—	—	—	—	
Eli Lilly	(United States)	1,167	1,167	5 Feb 2026	21 Nov 2025	—	—	—	—	
Walmart	(United States)	1,070	1,070	19 May 2026	3 Feb 2026	—	—	—	—	
Samsung	(South Korea)	1,520	1,520	20 Jun 2026	26 Feb 2026	—	—	—	—	
PetroChina	(China)	1,200	1,792	5 Nov 2007	5 Nov 2007	—	—	—	—	(Note: On 5 November 2007, A shares of PetroChina ended their first day of trading after an IPO on the Shanghai Stock Exchange yielded a market cap of approximately $1 trillion. Only 4 billion A shares were floated during the IPO, another 158 billion A shares were still held by China National Petroleum Corporation. 21.9 billion H shares were already floated on the Hong Kong Stock Exchange. However, market capitalization based on H shares never reached $500 billion.)
Micron Technology	(United States)	1,020	1,020	26 May 2026	26 May 2026	—	—	—	—	
SK Hynix	(South Korea)	1,280	1,280	20 Jun 2026	27 May 2026	—	—	—	—	
AMD	(United States)	1,005	1,005	21 Sep 2026	21 Sep 2026	—	—	—	—	
Anthropic	(United States)	1,476	1,476	19 Nov 2026	19 Nov 2026					

== Publicly traded companies ==
Only companies with free float of at least 15% are included, and investment companies are excluded from these lists. For lists based on Financial Times data, the value of unlisted stock classes is excluded.

Note: All market capitalization figures are in USD billions.

=== 2026 ===
This list is up to date as of 1 October 2026. Indicated changes in market value are relative to the previous quarter.

Rank	First quarter		Second quarter		Third quarter	
1	(United States)	Nvidia ▼4,238	(United States)	Nvidia ▲4,846	(United States)	Nvidia ▲5,514
2	(United States)	Apple ▼3,730	(United States)	Alphabet ▲4,311	(United States)	Apple ▲4,860
3	(United States)	Alphabet ▼3,470	(United States)	Apple ▲4,249	(United States)	Alphabet ▼4,167
4	(United States)	Microsoft ▼2,751	(United States)	Microsoft ▲2,770	(United States)	Microsoft ▲3,808
5	(United States)	Amazon ▼2,235	(United States)	Amazon ▲2,563	(United States)	Amazon ▲2,687
6	(Taiwan)	TSMC ▲1,752	(Taiwan)	TSMC ▲2,475	(Taiwan)	TSMC ▼2,366
7	(United States)	Broadcom ▼1,467	(United States)	Broadcom ▲1,797	(United States)	SpaceX; 1,987
8	(United States)	Meta ▼1,447	(United States)	Tesla ▲1,579	(United States)	Meta ▲1,847
9	(United States)	Tesla ▼1,394	(United States)	Meta ▼1,429	(United States)	Broadcom ▼1,676
10	(United States)	Berkshire Hathaway ▼1,033	(South Korea)	Samsung ▲1,416	(United States)	Tesla ▼1,401

=== 2025 ===
This list is up to date as of 31 December 2025. Indicated changes in market value are relative to the previous quarter.

Rank	First quarter		Second quarter		Third quarter		Fourth quarter	
1	(United States)	Apple ▼3,337	(United States)	Nvidia ▲3,850	(United States)	Nvidia ▲4,542	(United States)	Nvidia ▲4,638
2	(United States)	Microsoft ▼2,791	(United States)	Microsoft ▲3,700	(United States)	Microsoft ▲3,850	(United States)	Apple ▲4,057
3	(United States)	Nvidia ▼2,644	(United States)	Apple ▼3,060	(United States)	Apple ▲3,794	(United States)	Alphabet ▲3,802
4	(United States)	Amazon ▼2,016	(United States)	Amazon ▲2,330	(United States)	Alphabet ▲2,975	(United States)	Microsoft ▼3,625
5	(United States)	Alphabet ▼1,895	(United States)	Alphabet ▲2,150	(United States)	Amazon ▲2,341	(United States)	Amazon ▲2,485
6	(United States)	Meta ▼1,460	(United States)	Meta ▲1,860	(United States)	Meta ▼1,845	(United States)	Meta ▼1,671
7	(United States)	Berkshire Hathaway ▲1,140	(United States)	Broadcom ▲1,300	(United States)	Broadcom ▲1,589	(United States)	Broadcom ▲1,669
8	(United States)	Tesla ▼833.529	(Taiwan)	TSMC ▲1,170	(United States)	Tesla ▲1,478	(United States)	Tesla ▲1,580
9	(United States)	Broadcom ▼787.247	(United States)	Berkshire Hathaway ▼1,050	(Taiwan)	TSMC ▲1,448	(Taiwan)	TSMC ▲1,570
10	(United States)	Eli Lilly ▲782.95	(United States)	Tesla ▲1,020	(United States)	Berkshire Hathaway ▲1,086	(United States)	Berkshire Hathaway ▼1,074

=== 2024 ===
This list is up to date as of 31 December 2024. Indicated changes in market value are relative to the previous quarter.

Rank	First quarter		Second quarter		Third quarter		Fourth quarter	
1	(United States)	Microsoft ▼3,126	(United States)	Apple ▼3,322	(United States)	Microsoft ▼3,543	(United States)	Apple ▼3,785
2	(United States)	Apple ▲2,648	(United States)	Microsoft ▼3,230	(United States)	Apple ▲3,198	(United States)	Nvidia ▼3,289
3	(United States)	Nvidia ▼2,259	(United States)	Nvidia ▼3,182	(United States)	Nvidia ▲2,979	(United States)	Microsoft ▲3,134
4	(United States)	Alphabet ▲1,893	(United States)	Alphabet ▲2,267	(United States)	Alphabet ▼2,058	(United States)	Alphabet ▲2,331
5	(United States)	Amazon ▲1,874	(United States)	Amazon ▲2,011	(United States)	Amazon ▼1,956	(United States)	Amazon ▲2,307
6	(United States)	Meta ▲1,238	(United States)	Meta ▲1,279	(United States)	Meta ▲1,448	(United States)	Meta ▲1,478
7	(United States)	Berkshire Hathaway ▲912.13	(Taiwan)	TSMC ▲901.39	(United States)	Berkshire Hathaway ▲993.02	(United States)	Tesla ▲1,296
8	(United States)	Eli Lilly ▲739.66	(United States)	Berkshire Hathaway ▼879.67	(Taiwan)	TSMC ▼900.67	(United States)	Broadcom ▲1,087
9	(Taiwan)	TSMC ▲705.69	(United States)	Eli Lilly ▲815.21	(United States)	Tesla ▲835.81	(Taiwan)	TSMC ▲1,024
10	(United States)	Broadcom ▲614.22	(United States)	Broadcom ▲747.36	(United States)	Broadcom ▲805.67	(United States)	Berkshire Hathaway ▼978.89

=== 2023 ===
This list is up to date as of 31 December 2023. Indicated changes in market value are relative to the previous quarter.

Rank	First quarter		Second quarter		Third quarter		Fourth quarter	
1	(United States)	Apple ▲2,609	(United States)	Apple ▲3,050	(United States)	Apple ▼2,677	(United States)	Apple ▲2,994
2	(United States)	Microsoft ▲2,146	(United States)	Microsoft ▲2,532	(United States)	Microsoft ▼2,346	(United States)	Microsoft ▲2,795
3	(United States)	Alphabet ▲1,332	(United States)	Alphabet ▲1,530	(United States)	Alphabet ▲1,662	(United States)	Alphabet ▲1,764
4	(United States)	Amazon ▲1,058	(United States)	Amazon ▲1,337	(United States)	Amazon ▼1,312	(United States)	Amazon ▲1,570
5	(United States)	Nvidia ▲686.09	(United States)	Nvidia ▲1,044	(United States)	Nvidia ▲1,074	(United States)	Nvidia ▲1,223
6	(United States)	Berkshire Hathaway ▼677.77	(United States)	Tesla ▲829.67	(United States)	Tesla ▼794.2	(United States)	Meta ▲909
7	(United States)	Tesla ▲656.42	(United States)	Berkshire Hathaway ▲745.01	(United States)	Meta ▲772.49	(United States)	Tesla ▼789.93
8	(United States)	Meta ▲549.48	(United States)	Meta ▲735.45	(United States)	Berkshire Hathaway ▲769.26	(United States)	Berkshire Hathaway ▲783.55
9	(Taiwan)	TSMC ▲482.41	(Taiwan)	TSMC ▲523.41	(United States)	Eli Lilly ▲509.89	(United States)	Eli Lilly ▲553.37
10	(United States)	Visa ▲473.87	(United States)	Visa ▲497.37	(United States)	Visa ▼480.99	(Taiwan)	TSMC ▲539.39

=== 2022 ===
This list is as of 31 December 2022. Indicated changes in market value are relative to the previous quarter.

Rank	First quarter		Second quarter		Third quarter		Fourth quarter	
1	(United States)	Apple ▼2,850	(United States)	Apple ▼2,212	(United States)	Apple ▲2,221	(United States)	Apple ▼2,066
2	(United States)	Microsoft ▼2,311	(United States)	Microsoft ▼1,920	(United States)	Microsoft ▼1,737	(United States)	Microsoft ▲1,787
3	(United States)	Alphabet ▼1,846	(United States)	Alphabet ▼1,435	(United States)	Alphabet ▼1,254	(United States)	Alphabet ▼1,145
4	(United States)	Amazon ▼1,659	(United States)	Amazon ▼1,080	(United States)	Amazon ▲1,151	(United States)	Amazon ▼856.94
5	(United States)	Tesla ▲1,114	(United States)	Tesla ▼697.66	(United States)	Tesla ▲831.15	(United States)	Berkshire Hathaway ▲681.77
6	(United States)	Berkshire Hathaway ▲779.15	(United States)	Berkshire Hathaway ▼602.45	(United States)	Berkshire Hathaway ▼596.41	(United States)	UnitedHealth ▲495.37
7	(United States)	Nvidia ▼684.88	(United States)	UnitedHealth ▲481.87	(United States)	UnitedHealth ▼472.41	(United States)	Johnson & Johnson ▲461.84
8	(United States)	Meta ▼605.25	(United States)	Johnson & Johnson ▼467.09	(United States)	Johnson & Johnson ▼429.5	(United States)	ExxonMobil ▲454.24
9	(Taiwan)	TSMC ▼540.67	(China)	Tencent ▼445.99	(United States)	Visa ▲374.38	(United States)	Visa ▲439.95
10	(United States)	UnitedHealth ▲479.83	(United States)	Meta ▼436.39	(United States)	Meta ▼364.65	(China)	Tencent ▲405.09

=== 2021 ===
This list is up to date as of December 31, 2021. Indicated changes in market value are relative to the previous quarter.

Rank	First quarter		Second quarter		Third quarter		Fourth quarter	
1	(United States)	Apple ▼2,050	(United States)	Apple ▲2,286	(United States)	Apple ▲2,339	(United States)	Apple ▲2,913
2	(United States)	Microsoft ▲1,778	(United States)	Microsoft ▲2,040	(United States)	Microsoft ▲2,119	(United States)	Microsoft ▲2,525
3	(United States)	Amazon ▼1,558	(United States)	Amazon ▲1,735	(United States)	Alphabet ▲1,777	(United States)	Alphabet ▲1,922
4	(United States)	Alphabet ▲1,395	(United States)	Alphabet ▲1,680	(United States)	Amazon ▼1,664	(United States)	Amazon ▲1,691
5	(United States)	Meta ▲838.72	(United States)	Meta ▲985.92	(United States)	Meta ▼956.89	(United States)	Tesla ▲1,061
6	(China)	Tencent ▲766.97	(China)	Tencent ▼721.46	(United States)	Tesla ▲776.85	(United States)	Meta ▼935.64
7	(United States)	Tesla ▼641.11	(United States)	Tesla ▲654.78	(United States)	Berkshire Hathaway ▼619.95	(United States)	Nvidia ▲732.92
8	(China)	Alibaba Group ▼615.01	(United States)	Berkshire Hathaway ▲637.28	(Taiwan)	TSMC ▼579.03	(United States)	Berkshire Hathaway ▲668.63
9	(Taiwan)	TSMC ▲613.41	(Taiwan)	TSMC ▲623.16	(China)	Tencent ▼574.46	(Taiwan)	TSMC ▲623.93
10	(United States)	Berkshire Hathaway ▲590.05	(China)	Alibaba Group ▲615.14	(United States)	Nvidia ▲517.9	(China)	Tencent ▼559.9

=== 2020 ===
This Financial Times–based list is up to data as of December 31, 2020. Indicated changes in market value are relative to the previous quarter.

Rank	First quarter		Second quarter		Third quarter		Fourth quarter	
1	(United States)	Microsoft ▼1,200	(United States)	Apple ▲1,576	(United States)	Apple ▲1,981	(United States)	Apple ▲2,254
2	(United States)	Apple ▼1,113	(United States)	Microsoft ▲1,551	(United States)	Microsoft ▲1,592	(United States)	Microsoft ▲1,682
3	(United States)	Amazon ▲970.59	(United States)	Amazon ▲1,432.59	(United States)	Amazon ▲1,577	(United States)	Amazon ▲1,634
4	(United States)	Alphabet ▼799.18	(United States)	Alphabet ▲979.7	(United States)	Alphabet ▲999.57	(United States)	Alphabet ▲1,185
5	(China)	Alibaba Group ▼521.74	(United States)	Facebook ▲675.69	(China)	Alibaba Group ▲795.4	(United States)	Facebook ▲776.59
6	(United States)	Facebook ▼475.46	(China)	Tencent ▲620.92	(United States)	Facebook ▲746.1	(China)	Tencent ▲683.47
7	(China)	Tencent ▲471.66	(China)	Alibaba Group ▲579.74	(China)	Tencent ▲646.79	(United States)	Tesla ▲668.08
8	(United States)	Berkshire Hathaway ▼440.83	(United States)	Berkshire Hathaway ▼432.57	(United States)	Berkshire Hathaway ▲509.47	(China)	Alibaba Group ▼628.65
9	(United States)	Visa ▼357.02	(United States)	Visa ▲412.71	(United States)	Visa ▲425.51	(Taiwan)	TSMC ▲565.28
10	(United States)	Johnson & Johnson ▼345.7	(United States)	Johnson & Johnson ▲370.59	(Taiwan)	TSMC ▲420.44	(United States)	Berkshire Hathaway ▲544.78

=== 2019 ===
This Financial Times–based list is up to date as of December 31, 2019. Indicated changes in market value are relative to the previous quarter.

Rank	First quarter		Second quarter		Third quarter		Fourth quarter	
1	(United States)	Microsoft ▲904.86	(United States)	Microsoft ▲1,028	(United States)	Microsoft ▲1,062	(United States)	Apple ▲1,305
2	(United States)	Apple ▲835.67	(United States)	Amazon ▲928.54	(United States)	Apple ▲1,012	(United States)	Microsoft ▲1,203
3	(United States)	Amazon ▲874.71	(United States)	Apple ▲911.24	(United States)	Amazon ▼858.68	(United States)	Alphabet ▲922.13
4	(United States)	Alphabet ▲818.16	(United States)	Alphabet ▼751.17	(United States)	Alphabet ▲838.02	(United States)	Amazon ▲916.15
5	(United States)	Berkshire Hathaway ▼493.75	(United States)	Facebook ▲551.49	(United States)	Berkshire Hathaway ▼508.53	(United States)	Facebook ▲585.32
6	(United States)	Facebook ▲475.73	(United States)	Berkshire Hathaway ▲521.1	(United States)	Facebook ▼508.05	(China)	Alibaba Group ▲569.01
7	(China)	Alibaba Group ▲472.94	(China)	Alibaba Group ▼439.15	(China)	Alibaba Group ▼435.4	(United States)	Berkshire Hathaway ▲553.53
8	(China)	Tencent ▲440.98	(China)	Tencent ▼432.08	(China)	Tencent ▼398.84	(China)	Tencent ▲461.37
9	(United States)	Johnson & Johnson ▲372.23	(United States)	Visa ▲379.271	(United States)	Visa ▲385.37	(United States)	JPMorgan Chase ▲437.23
10	(United States)	Visa ▲353.71	(United States)	Johnson & Johnson ▼370.3	(United States)	JPMorgan Chase ▲376.31	(United States)	Visa ▲416.79

=== 2018 ===
This Financial Times–based list is up to date as of December 31, 2018. Indicated changes in market value are relative to the previous quarter.

Rank	First quarter		Second quarter		Third quarter		Fourth quarter	
1	(United States)	Apple ▼851.317	(United States)	Apple ▲909.84	(United States)	Apple ▲1,091	(United States)	Microsoft ▼780.52
2	(United States)	Alphabet ▼715.404	(United States)	Amazon ▲824.79	(United States)	Amazon ▲976.65	(United States)	Apple ▼748.68
3	(United States)	Microsoft ▲702.76	(United States)	Alphabet ▲774.84	(United States)	Microsoft ▲877.4	(United States)	Amazon ▼735.9
4	(United States)	Amazon ▲700.672	(United States)	Microsoft ▲757.64	(United States)	Alphabet ▲839.74	(United States)	Alphabet ▼728.36
5	(China)	Tencent ▲507.99	(United States)	Facebook ▲562.48	(United States)	Berkshire Hathaway ▲523.52	(United States)	Berkshire Hathaway ▼499.59
6	(United States)	Berkshire Hathaway ▲492.019	(China)	Tencent ▼478.58	(United States)	Facebook ▼473.85	(United States)	Facebook ▼375.89
7	(China)	Alibaba Group ▲470.93	(China)	Alibaba Group ▲476.04	(China)	Alibaba Group ▼423.6	(China)	Tencent ▼375.11
8	(United States)	Facebook ▼464.189	(United States)	Berkshire Hathaway ▼463.98	(China)	Tencent ▼388.08	(China)	Alibaba Group ▼355.13
9	(United States)	JPMorgan Chase ▲377.41	(United States)	JPMorgan Chase ▼354.78	(United States)	JPMorgan Chase ▲379.44	(United States)	Johnson & Johnson ▼346.11
10	(United States)	Johnson & Johnson ▼343.78	(United States)	ExxonMobil ▲350.27	(United States)	Johnson & Johnson ▲370.65	(United States)	JPMorgan Chase ▼324.66

=== 2017 ===
This Financial Times–based list is up to date as of December 31, 2017. Indicated changes in market value are relative to the previous quarter.

Rank	First quarter (Note: In case some companies with multiple classes of stock only one class is considered.)		Second quarter		Third quarter		Fourth quarter	
1	(United States)	Apple ▲753.718	(United States)	Apple ▼749.124	(United States)	Apple ▲791.726	(United States)	Apple ▲868.88
2	(United States)	Alphabet ▲573.57	(United States)	Alphabet ▲628.61	(United States)	Alphabet ▲664.55	(United States)	Alphabet ▲727.04
3	(United States)	Microsoft ▲508.935	(United States)	Microsoft ▲528.778	(United States)	Microsoft ▲568.965	(United States)	Microsoft ▲659.91
4	(United States)	Amazon ▲423.031	(United States)	Amazon ▲466.471	(United States)	Amazon ▼459.435	(United States)	Amazon ▲563.54
5	(United States)	Berkshire Hathaway ▲410.88	(United States)	Berkshire Hathaway ▲418.88	(United States)	Berkshire Hathaway ▲451.84	(United States)	Facebook ▲512.76
6	(United States)	ExxonMobil ▲339.897	(United States)	Johnson & Johnson ▲357.31	(China)	Alibaba Group ▲436.85	(China)	Tencent ▲493.34
7	(United States)	Johnson & Johnson ▲337.947	(United States)	Facebook ▲357.176	(China)	Tencent ▲405.007	(United States)	Berkshire Hathaway ▲489.49
8	(United States)	Facebook ▲334.552	(China)	Alibaba Group ▲356.39	(United States)	Facebook ▲399.946	(China)	Alibaba Group ▲440.712
9	(United States)	JPMorgan Chase ▲313.761	(China)	Tencent ▲344.879	(United States)	ExxonMobil ▲348.248	(United States)	Johnson & Johnson ▲375.36
10	(United States)	Wells Fargo ▲278.516	(United States)	ExxonMobil ▲341.947	(United States)	Johnson & Johnson ▼347.497	(United States)	JPMorgan Chase ▲371.05

=== 2016 ===
This Financial Times–based list is up to date as of December 31, 2016. Indicated changes in market value are relative to the previous quarter.

Rank	First quarter		Second quarter		Third quarter		Fourth quarter	
1	(United States)	Apple ▲607.465	(United States)	Apple ▼517.069	(United States)	Apple ▲604.475	(United States)	Apple ▲617.588
2	(United States)	Alphabet ▲535.66	(United States)	Alphabet ▼475.32	(United States)	Alphabet ▲535.66	(United States)	Alphabet ▼531.97
3	(United States)	Microsoft ▲439.734	(United States)	Microsoft ▼397.268	(United States)	Microsoft ▲447.29	(United States)	Microsoft ▲483.16
4	(United States)	ExxonMobil ▲350.991	(United States)	ExxonMobil ▲383.396	(United States)	Amazon ▲393.03	(United States)	Berkshire Hathaway ▲404.39
5	(United States)	Berkshire Hathaway ▲349.74	(United States)	Berkshire Hathaway ▼345.86	(United States)	ExxonMobil ▼358.519	(United States)	ExxonMobil ▲374.28
6	(United States)	Johnson & Johnson ▲300.604	(United States)	Amazon ▲337.641	(United States)	Berkshire Hathaway ▲358.3	(United States)	Amazon ▼356.313
7	(United States)	General Electric ▼295.546	(United States)	Johnson & Johnson ▲328.234	(United States)	Johnson & Johnson ▼320.836	(United States)	Johnson & Johnson ▼313.432
8	(United States)	Amazon ▼281.888	(United States)	General Electric ▼280.927	(United States)	Facebook ▲297.548	(United States)	JPMorgan Chase ▲308.768
9	(United States)	Facebook ▲259.192	(United States)	Facebook ▲263.93	(China)	Tencent ▲265.603	(United States)	General Electric ▲279.546
10	(United States)	Wells Fargo ▼246.035	(United States)	AT&T ▲261.035	(United States)	General Electric ▼261.876	(United States)	Wells Fargo ▼276.779

=== 2015 ===
This Financial Times–based list is up to date as of December 31, 2015. Indicated changes in market value are relative to the previous quarter.

Rank	First quarter		Second quarter		Third quarter		Fourth quarter	
1	(United States)	Apple ▲724.773	(United States)	Apple ▼722.577	(United States)	Apple ▼621.939	(United States)	Apple ▼598.344
2	(United States)	ExxonMobil ▼356.549	(United States)	Microsoft ▲357.154	(United States)	Google ▲407.87	(United States)	Alphabet ▲534.09
3	(United States)	Berkshire Hathaway ▼356.511	(United States)	ExxonMobil ▼347.868	(United States)	Microsoft ▼347.432	(United States)	Microsoft ▲439.68
4	(United States)	Google ▲345.849	(United States)	Google ▲336.015	(United States)	Berkshire Hathaway ▼318.18	(United States)	Berkshire Hathaway ▲323.75
5	(United States)	Microsoft ▼333.525	(United States)	Berkshire Hathaway ▼336.015	(United States)	ExxonMobil ▼304.245	(United States)	ExxonMobil ▲325.167
6	(China)	Petro China ▲329.715	(China)	Petro China ▼319.392	(United States)	Johnson & Johnson ▼257.637	(United States)	Amazon ▲323.009
7	(United States)	Wells Fargo ▼279.92	(China)	ICBC ▲298.532	(United States)	General Electric ▼248.069	(United States)	General Electric ▲313.892
8	(United States)	Johnson & Johnson ▼279.724	(United States)	Wells Fargo ▲289.591	(China)	China Mobile ▲243.186	(United States)	Johnson & Johnson ▲287.153
9	(China)	ICBC ▲275.389	(United States)	Johnson & Johnson ▼270.261	(Switzerland)	Novartis ▲240.373	(United States)	Wells Fargo ▲281.77
10	(Switzerland)	Novartis ▲267.897	(United States)	General Electric ▲267.717	(Switzerland)	Nestlé ▲233.361	(United States)	JPMorgan Chase ▲245.126

=== 2014 ===
This Financial Times–based list is up to date as of December 31, 2014. Indicated changes in market value are relative to the previous quarter.

Rank	First quarter		Second quarter		Third quarter		Fourth quarter	
1	(United States)	Apple ▼478.766	(United States)	Apple ▲560.337	(United States)	Apple ▲603.277	(United States)	Apple ▲647.361
2	(United States)	ExxonMobil ▼422.098	(United States)	ExxonMobil ▲432.357	(United States)	ExxonMobil ▼401.094	(United States)	ExxonMobil ▼391.482
3	(United States)	Microsoft ▲340.217	(United States)	Google ▲358.347	(United States)	Microsoft ▲381.96	(United States)	Microsoft ▲382.88
4	(United States)	Google ▲313.004	(United States)	Microsoft ▲344.459	(United States)	Google ▲361.998	(United States)	Berkshire Hathaway ▲370.653
5	(United States)	Berkshire Hathaway ▲308.091	(United States)	Berkshire Hathaway ▲312.217	(United States)	Berkshire Hathaway ▲340.055	(United States)	Google ▼329.769
6	(United States)	Johnson & Johnson ▲277.826	(United States)	Johnson & Johnson ▲295.98	(United States)	Johnson & Johnson ▲300.614	(China)	PetroChina ▲305.536
7	(United States)	Wells Fargo ▲261.218	(United States)	Wells Fargo ▲276.837	(United States)	Wells Fargo ▲270.782	(United States)	Johnson & Johnson ▼292.703
8	(United States)	General Electric ▼259.547	(Netherlands) (United Kingdom)	Royal Dutch Shell ▲269.563	(United States)	General Electric ▼257.068	(United States)	Wells Fargo ▲284.386
9	(Switzerland)	Hoffmann-La Roche ▲258.542	(United States)	General Electric ▲263.53	(Switzerland)	Novartis ▲255.326	(United States)	Walmart ▼276.807
10	(United States)	Walmart ▼246.806	(Switzerland)	Hoffmann-La Roche ▼256.323	(Switzerland)	Hoffmann-La Roche ▼254.544	(China)	ICBC ▲271.146

=== 2013 ===
This Financial Times–based list is up to date as of 31 December 2013. Indicated changes in market value are relative to the previous quarter.

Rank	First quarter		Second quarter		Third quarter		Fourth quarter	
1	(United States)	Apple ▼415.683	(United States)	ExxonMobil ▼401.73	(United States)	Apple ▲433.1	(United States)	Apple ▲504.771
2	(United States)	ExxonMobil ▲403.733	(United States)	Apple ▼372.202	(United States)	ExxonMobil ▼378.716	(United States)	ExxonMobil ▲442.143
3	(United States)	Berkshire Hathaway ▲256.802	(United States)	Microsoft ▲288.489	(United States)	Berkshire Hathaway ▲280.002	(United States)	Microsoft ▲312.297
4	(China)	PetroChina ▼254.619	(United States)	Berkshire Hathaway ▲276.549	(United States)	Microsoft ▼277.221	(United States)	Google ▲310.079
5	(United States)	Walmart ▲246.373	(United States)	Walmart ▼244.079	(United States)	Johnson & Johnson ▲244.299	(United States)	Berkshire Hathaway ▲292.396
6	(United States)	General Electric ▲239.776	(United States)	Johnson & Johnson ▲241.171	(United States)	General Electric ▲243.29	(United States)	General Electric ▲283.59
7	(United States)	Microsoft ▲239.602	(United States)	General Electric ▲239.787	(United States)	Walmart ▼240.773	(United States)	Johnson & Johnson ▲258.415
8	(United States)	IBM ▲237.725	(United States)	Google ▲238.689	(United States)	Google ▼237.479	(United States)	Walmart ▲254.623
9	(Switzerland)	Nestlé ▲233.792	(United States)	Chevron Corporation ▼229.403	(United States)	Chevron Corporation ▲234.741	(Switzerland)	Hoffmann-La Roche ▲241.368
10	(United States)	Chevron Corporation ▲230.831	(China)	ICBC ▲226.88	(Switzerland)	Hoffmann-La Roche ▲232.495	(United States)	Chevron Corporation ▲240.223

=== 2012 ===
This Financial Times–based list is up to date as of 31 December 2012. Indicated changes in market value are relative to the previous quarter.

Rank	First quarter		Second quarter		Third quarter		Fourth quarter	
1	(United States)	Apple ▲559.002	(United States)	Apple ▼546.076	(United States)	Apple ▲625.348	(United States)	Apple ▼500.611
2	(United States)	ExxonMobil ▲408.777	(United States)	ExxonMobil ▼400.139	(United States)	ExxonMobil ▲422.128	(United States)	ExxonMobil ▼394.611
3	(China)	PetroChina ▲278.968	(China)	PetroChina ▼257.686	(China)	PetroChina ▼253.853	(China)	PetroChina ▲264.833
4	(United States)	Microsoft ▲270.644	(United States)	Microsoft ▼256.982	(United States)	Microsoft ▼249.49	(Australia) (United Kingdom)	BHP Billiton ▲247.409
5	(United States)	IBM ▲241.755	(United States)	Walmart ▲235.9	(United States)	Walmart ▲248.074	(China)	ICBC ▲236.458
6	(China)	ICBC ▲236.335	(United States)	IBM ▼225.599	(United States)	General Electric ▲239.791	(China)	China Mobile ▲234.04
7	(Netherlands) (United Kingdom)	Royal Dutch Shell ▼222.425	(United States)	General Electric ▲220.806	(United States)	IBM ▲237.068	(United States)	Walmart ▼228.245
8	(China)	China Mobile ▲220.979	(China)	China Mobile ▼219.481	(United States)	Chevron Corporation ▲228.707	(South Korea)	Samsung Electronics ▲227.582
9	(United States)	General Electric ▲212.318	(Netherlands) (United Kingdom)	Royal Dutch Shell ▼217.048	(China)	China Mobile ▲222.818	(United States)	Microsoft ▼224.801
10	(United States)	Chevron Corporation ▲211.951	(China)	ICBC ▼211.196	(Netherlands) (United Kingdom)	Royal Dutch Shell ▲222.67	(Netherlands) (United Kingdom)	Royal Dutch Shell; 222.67

=== 2011 ===
This Financial Times–based list is up to date as of 31 December 2011. Indicated changes in market value are relative to the previous quarter.

Rank	First quarter		Second quarter		Third quarter		Fourth quarter	
1	(United States)	ExxonMobil ▲417.167	(United States)	ExxonMobil ▼400.885	(United States)	Apple ▲353.518	(United States)	ExxonMobil ▲406.272
2	(China)	PetroChina ▲326.199	(United States)	Apple ▼310.412	(United States)	ExxonMobil ▼353.135	(United States)	Apple ▲376.411
3	(United States)	Apple ▲321.072	(China)	PetroChina ▼303.65	(China)	PetroChina ▼276.474	(China)	PetroChina ▲276.845
4	(China)	ICBC ▲251.078	(China)	ICBC ▼246.851	(United States)	IBM ▲208.844	(Netherlands) (United Kingdom)	Royal Dutch Shell ▲236.677
5	(Brazil)	Petrobras ▲247.418	(Australia) (United Kingdom)	BHP Billiton ▼233.627	(United States)	Microsoft ▼208.535	(China)	ICBC ▲228.168
6	(Australia) (United Kingdom)	BHP Billiton ▲247.08	(Netherlands) (United Kingdom)	Royal Dutch Shell ▼225.123	(China)	ICBC ▼206.021	(United States)	Microsoft ▲218.38
7	(China)	China Construction Bank ▲232.609	(United States)	Microsoft ▲219.252	(China)	China Mobile ▲198.779	(United States)	IBM ▲216.724
8	(Netherlands) (United Kingdom)	Royal Dutch Shell ▲226.129	(Switzerland)	Nestlé ▲215.018	(Netherlands) (United Kingdom)	Royal Dutch Shell ▼197.061	(United States)	Chevron Corporation ▲211.894
9	(United States)	Chevron Corporation ▲215.781	(Brazil)	Petrobras ▼210.111	(Switzerland)	Nestlé ▼191.116	(United States)	Walmart ▲204.66
10	(United States)	Microsoft ▼213.336	(United States)	IBM ▲207.781	(United States)	Chevron Corporation ▼185.456	(China)	China Mobile ▼196.148

=== 2010 ===
This Financial Times–based list is up to date as of 31 December 2010. Indicated changes in market value are relative to the previous quarter.

Rank	First quarter		Second quarter		Third quarter		Fourth quarter	
1	(China)	PetroChina ▼329.26	(United States)	ExxonMobil ▼291.789	(United States)	ExxonMobil ▲314.623	(United States)	ExxonMobil ▲368.712
2	(United States)	ExxonMobil ▼316.231	(China)	PetroChina ▼268.505	(China)	PetroChina ▲270.89	(China)	PetroChina ▲303.274
3	(United States)	Microsoft ▼256.865	(United States)	Apple ▲228.877	(United States)	Apple ▲259.223	(United States)	Apple ▲295.886
4	(China)	ICBC ▼246.42	(China)	ICBC ▼211.259	(Brazil)	Petrobras ▲220.617	(Australia) (United Kingdom)	BHP Billiton ▲243.54
5	(United States)	Apple ▲213.097	(United States)	Microsoft ▼201.656	(China)	ICBC ▲213.364	(United States)	Microsoft ▲238.785
6	(Australia) (United Kingdom)	BHP Billiton ▲209.935	(China)	China Mobile ▲201.471	(United States)	Microsoft ▲210.676	(China)	ICBC ▲233.369
7	(United States)	Walmart ▲209.001	(United States)	Berkshire Hathaway ▼197.357	(China)	China Mobile ▲205.34	(Brazil)	Petrobras ▲229.067
8	(United States)	Berkshire Hathaway ▲200.621	(China)	China Construction Bank ▲189.171	(United States)	Berkshire Hathaway ▲204.792	(China)	China Construction Bank ▲222.245
9	(United States)	General Electric ▲194.246	(United States)	Walmart ▼178.323	(China)	China Construction Bank ▲202.998	(Netherlands) (United Kingdom)	Royal Dutch Shell ▲208.594
10	(China)	China Mobile ▲192.999	(United States)	Procter & Gamble; 172.737	(Australia) (United Kingdom)	BHP Billiton ▲196.866	(Switzerland)	Nestlé ▲203.534

=== 2009 ===
This Financial Times–based list is up to date as of 31 December 2009. Indicated changes in market value are relative to the previous quarter.

Rank	First quarter		Second quarter		Third quarter		Fourth quarter	
1	(United States)	ExxonMobil ▼336.527	(China)	PetroChina ▲366.663	(United States)	ExxonMobil ▼329.725	(China)	PetroChina ▲353.14
2	(China)	PetroChina ▲287.185	(United States)	ExxonMobil ▲341.14	(China)	PetroChina ▼325.098	(United States)	ExxonMobil ▼323.717
3	(United States)	Walmart ▼204.365	(China)	ICBC ▲257.004	(China)	ICBC ▼237.952	(United States)	Microsoft ▲270.635
4	(China)	ICBC ▲187.885	(United States)	Microsoft ▲211.546	(United States)	Microsoft ▲229.631	(China)	ICBC ▲268.956
5	(China)	China Mobile ▼174.673	(China)	China Mobile ▲200.832	(United Kingdom)	HSBC ▲198.561	(United States)	Walmart ▲203.654
6	(United States)	Microsoft ▼163.32	(United States)	Walmart ▼188.752	(China)	China Mobile ▼195.68	(China)	China Construction Bank ▲201.436
7	(United States)	AT&T ▼148.511	(China)	China Construction Bank ▲182.187	(United States)	Walmart ▲189.332	(Australia) (United Kingdom)	BHP Billiton ▲201.248
8	(United States)	Johnson & Johnson ▼145.481	(Brazil)	Petrobras ▲165.057	(Brazil)	Petrobras ▲189.028	(United Kingdom)	HSBC ▲199.255
9	(Netherlands) (United Kingdom)	Royal Dutch Shell ▼138.999	(United States)	Johnson & Johnson ▲156.516	(China)	China Construction Bank ▲186.817	(Brazil)	Petrobras ▲199.108
10	(United States)	Procter & Gamble ▼138.013	(Netherlands) (United Kingdom)	Royal Dutch Shell ▲156.387	(Netherlands) (United Kingdom)	Royal Dutch Shell ▲175.986	(United States)	Apple ▲189.802

=== 2008 ===
This Financial Times–based list is up to date as of 31 December 2008. Indicated changes in market value are relative to the previous quarter.

Rank	First quarter		Second quarter		Third quarter		Fourth quarter	
1	(United States)	ExxonMobil ▼452.505	(United States)	ExxonMobil ▲465.652	(United States)	ExxonMobil ▲403.366	(United States)	ExxonMobil ▲406.067
2	(China)	PetroChina ▼423.996	(China)	PetroChina ▲341.14	(China)	PetroChina ▼325.098	(China)	PetroChina ▼259.836
3	(United States)	General Electric ▼369.569	(China)	ICBC ▲257.004	(China)	ICBC ▼237.952	(United States)	Walmart ▼219.898
4	(Russia)	Gazprom ▼299.764	(United States)	Microsoft ▲211.546	(United States)	Microsoft ▲229.631	(China)	China Mobile ▲201.291
5	(China)	China Mobile ▼298.093	(China)	China Mobile ▲200.832	(United Kingdom)	HSBC ▲198.561	(United States)	Procter & Gamble ▼184.576
6	(China)	ICBC ▼277.236	(United States)	Walmart ▼188.752	(China)	China Mobile ▼195.68	(China)	ICBC ▼173.93
7	(United States)	Microsoft ▼264.132	(China)	China Construction Bank ▲182.187	(United States)	Walmart ▲189.332	(United States)	Microsoft ▼172.929
8	(United States)	AT&T ▼231.168	(Brazil)	Petrobras ▲165.057	(Brazil)	Petrobras ▲189.028	(United States)	AT&T ▲167.95
9	(Netherlands) (United Kingdom)	Royal Dutch Shell ▼220.11	(United States)	Johnson & Johnson ▲156.516	(China)	China Construction Bank ▲186.817	(United States)	Johnson & Johnson ▼166.002
10	(United States)	Procter & Gamble ▼215.64	(Netherlands) (United Kingdom)	Royal Dutch Shell ▲156.387	(Netherlands) (United Kingdom)	Royal Dutch Shell ▲175.986	(United States)	General Electric ▼161.278

=== 2007 ===
This Financial Times–based list is up to date as of 31 December 2007. Indicated changes in market value are relative to the previous quarter.

Rank	First quarter		Second quarter		Third quarter		Fourth quarter	
1	(United States)	ExxonMobil ▼429.567	(United States)	ExxonMobil ▲472.519	(United States)	ExxonMobil ▲513.362	(China)	Petrochina ▲723.952
2	(United States)	General Electric ▼363.611	(United States)	General Electric ▲393.831	(United States)	General Electric ▲424.191	(United States)	ExxonMobil ▼511.887
3	(United States)	Microsoft ▼272.912	(United States)	Microsoft ▲281.934	(China)	China Mobile ▲327.937	(United States)	General Electric ▼374.637
4	(United States)	Citigroup ▼252.857	(Netherlands) (United Kingdom)	Royal Dutch Shell ▲266.141	(China)	ICBC ▲279.269	(China)	China Mobile ▲354.12
5	(United States)	AT&T ▲246.206	(United States)	AT&T ▲255.871	(United States)	Microsoft ▼276.202	(China)	ICBC ▲338.989
6	(Russia)	Gazprom ▼245.911	(United States)	Citigroup ▲253.703	(Netherlands) (United Kingdom)	Royal Dutch Shell ▼264.397	(United States)	Microsoft ▲333.054
7	(Japan)	Toyota ▼230.832	(Russia)	Gazprom ▼245.757	(Russia)	Gazprom ▲260.249	(Russia)	Gazprom ▲329.591
8	(United States)	Bank of America ▼228.177	(United Kingdom)	BP ▲231.491	(United States)	AT&T ▲258.047	(Netherlands) (United Kingdom)	Royal Dutch Shell ▲269.544
9	(China)	ICBC ▼224.788	(Japan)	Toyota ▼228.009	(United States)	Citigroup ▼232.162	(United States)	AT&T ▼252.051
10	(Netherlands) (United Kingdom)	Royal Dutch Shell ▼214.018	(United States)	Bank of America ▼216.963	(United States)	Bank of America ▲223.066	(China)	Sinopec ▲249.645

=== 2006 ===
This Financial Times–based list is up to date as of December 2006. Indicated changes in market value are relative to the previous quarter.

Rank	First quarter		Second quarter		Third quarter		Fourth quarter	
1	(United States)	ExxonMobil ▲371.631	(United States)	ExxonMobil ▼371.187	(United States)	ExxonMobil ▲398.906	(United States)	ExxonMobil ▲446.943
2	(United States)	General Electric ▼362.527	(United States)	General Electric ▼342.731	(United States)	General Electric ▲364.414	(United States)	General Electric ▲383.564
3	(United States)	Microsoft ▲281.171	(Russia)	Gazprom ▲246.341	(United States)	Microsoft ▲272.679	(United States)	Microsoft ▲293.537
4	(United States)	Citigroup ▼238.935	(United States)	Citigroup ▲239.862	(Russia)	Gazprom ▼254.634	(United States)	Citigroup ▲273.691
5	(United Kingdom)	BP ▲233.26	(United States)	Microsoft ▼237.688	(United States)	Citigroup ▲246.727	(Russia)	Gazprom ▲271.482
6	(United States)	Bank of America ▲211.706	(United Kingdom)	BP ▲233.151	(United States)	Bank of America ▲242.451	(China)	ICBC ▲254.592
7	(Netherlands) (United Kingdom)	Royal Dutch Shell ▲211.28	(Netherlands) (United Kingdom)	Royal Dutch Shell ▲224.925	(Netherlands) (United Kingdom)	Royal Dutch Shell ▼216.368	(Japan)	Toyota ▲241.161
8	(United States)	Walmart ▲196.86	(United States)	Bank of America ▲219.504	(United Kingdom)	BP ▼215.623	(United States)	Bank of America ▼239.758
9	(Japan)	Toyota ▲196.731	(United Kingdom)	HSBC ▲201.854	(United Kingdom)	HSBC ▲209.774	(Netherlands) (United Kingdom)	Royal Dutch Shell ▲225.781
10	(Russia)	Gazprom ▲196.339	(United States)	Walmart ▲200.762	(United States)	Pfizer ▲206.785	(United Kingdom)	BP ▲218.643

=== 2005 ===
This Financial Times–based list is up to date as of 31 March 2005.

Rank	Name	Country	Primary industry	Market value (USD billion)
1	General Electric	United States	Conglomerate	▲382.233
2	ExxonMobil	United States	Oil and gas	▲380.567
3	Microsoft	United States	Software industry	▼262.975
4	Citigroup	United States	Banking	▼234.437
5	BP	United Kingdom	Oil and gas	▲221.365
6	Walmart	United States	Retail	▼212.209
7	Royal Dutch Shell	Netherlands United Kingdom	Oil and gas	▲210.63
8	Johnson & Johnson	United States	Health care	▲199.711
9	Pfizer	United States	Health care	▼195.945
10	Bank of America	United States	Banking	▲178.765

=== 2004 ===
This Financial Times–based list is up to date as 31 March 2004.

Rank	Name	Country	Primary industry	Market value (USD billion)
1	General Electric	United States	Conglomerate	▲299.336
2	Microsoft	United States	Software industry	▲271.911
3	ExxonMobil	United States	Oil and gas	▲263.94
4	Pfizer	United States	Health care	▲261.616
5	Citigroup	United States	Banking	▲259.191
6	Walmart	United States	Retail	▲258.888
7	American International Group	United States	Insurance	▲183.696
8	Intel Corporation	United States	Computer hardware	▲179.996
9	BP	United Kingdom	Oil and gas	▲174.648
10	HSBC	United Kingdom	Banking	▲163.574

=== 2003 ===
This Financial Times–based list is up to date as December 2003.

Rank	Name	Country	Primary industry	Market value (USD billion)
1	Microsoft	United States	Software industry	▼264.003
2	General Electric	United States	Conglomerate	▼259.647
3	ExxonMobil	United States	Oil and gas	▼241.037
4	Walmart	United States	Retail	▼234.399
5	Pfizer	United States	Health care	▼195.948
6	Citigroup	United States	Banking	▼183.887
7	Johnson & Johnson	United States	Health care	▼170.417
8	Royal Dutch Shell	Netherlands United Kingdom	Oil and gas	▼149.034
9	BP	United Kingdom	Oil and gas	▼144.381
10	IBM	United States	Computer software, computer hardware	▲139.272

=== 2002 ===
This Financial Times–based list is up to date December 2002.

Rank	Name	Country	Primary industry	Market value (USD billion)
1	General Electric	United States	Conglomerate	▼372.089
2	Microsoft	United States	Software industry	▲326.639
3	ExxonMobil	United States	Oil and gas	▲299.82
4	Walmart	United States	Retail	▲273.22
5	Citigroup	United States	Banking	▲255.299
6	Pfizer	United States	Health care	▼249.021
7	Intel Corporation	United States	Computer hardware	▼203.838
8	BP	United Kingdom	Oil and gas	▼200.794
9	Johnson & Johnson	United States	Health care	▲197.912
10	Royal Dutch Shell	Netherlands United Kingdom	Oil and gas	▼189.913

=== 2001 ===
This Financial Times–based list is up to date as 31 March 2001.

Rank	Name	Country	Primary industry	Market value (USD billion)
1	General Electric	United States	Conglomerate	▲477.406
2	Cisco Systems	United States	Networking hardware	▼304.699
3	ExxonMobil	United States	Oil and gas	▲286.367
4	Pfizer	United States	Health care	263.996
5	Microsoft	United States	Software industry	▼258.436
6	Walmart	United States	Retail	▼250.955
7	Citigroup	United States	Banking	250.143
8	Vodafone	United Kingdom	Telecommunications	227.175
9	Intel	United States	Computer hardware	▼227.048
10	Royal Dutch Shell	Netherlands United Kingdom	Oil and gas	206.34

=== 2000 ===
This Financial Times–based list is up to date as 31 March 2000.

Rank	Name	Country	Primary industry	Market value (USD billion)
1	Microsoft	United States	Software industry	▼586.197
2	General Electric	United States	Conglomerate	▼474.956
3	NTT Docomo	Japan	Telecommunications	▲366.204
4	Cisco Systems	United States	Networking hardware	▼348.965
5	Wal-Mart	United States	Retail	▼286.153
6	Intel	United States	Computer hardware	▲277.096
7	Nippon Telegraph & Telephone	Japan	Telecommunications	▲274.905
8	ExxonMobil	United States	Oil and gas	▼265.894
9	Lucent	United States	Telecommunications	▲237.668
10	Deutsche Telekom	Germany	Telecommunications	▼209.628

== See also ==
- List of countries by stock market capitalization
- List of largest companies by revenue
- List of largest employers
- List of largest corporate profits and losses
- List of wealthiest religious organizations
- Corporate capitalism
- World Economic Forum
- Fortune Global 500
- Forbes Global 2000
- Most Valuable Nation Brands List
