= List of largest companies by revenue =

Amazon, the world's largest company by revenue since 2026

This list comprises the world's largest companies by consolidated revenue, according to the 2026 Fortune Global 500 ranking, which covers fiscal years ending on or before 31 March 2026. Among the 50 largest companies, 26 are in the United States, 17 are in Asia, and 7 are in Europe.

This list is limited to the largest 50 companies, all of which reported annual revenues exceeding US$150 billion. This list is incomplete, as not all companies disclose their information to the media or general public. Data reflects each company's most recent fiscal year as reported to Fortune, primarily 2025.

== List ==
| Ranks | Name | Industry | Revenue | Profit | Employees | Headquarters (Note: As reported by source.) | State-owned | Ref. |
| Ranks | Name | Industry | USD (in billions) | | Employees | Headquarters | State-owned | Ref. |
|---|---|---|---|---|---|---|---|---|
| 1 | Amazon | Information technology | 717 ▲ | 77.7 | 1,576,000 | United States | No | |
| 2 | Walmart | Retail | 713 ▲ | 21.9 | 2,100,000 | United States | No | |
| 3 | State Grid Corporation of China | Electricity | 555 ▲ | 11.1 | 1,350,000 | China | Yes | |
| 4 | UnitedHealth Group | Healthcare | 448 ▲ | 12.1 | 390,000 | United States | No | |
| 5 | Saudi Aramco | Oil and gas | 446 ▼ | 92.8 | 76,660 | Saudi Arabia | Yes | |
| 6 | Apple | Information technology | 416 ▲ | 112 | 166,000 | United States | No | |
| 7 | McKesson | Healthcare | 403 ▲ | 4.8 | 42,300 | United States | No | |
| 8 | Alphabet | Information technology | 403 ▲ | 132 | 190,820 | United States | No | |
| 9 | CVS Health | Healthcare | 402 ▲ | 1.8 | 259,500 | United States | No | |
| 10 | China National Petroleum Corporation | Oil and gas | 402 ▼ | 21.2 | 948,580 | China | Yes | |
| 11 | Berkshire Hathaway | Financials | 371 ▲ | 67.0 | 387,800 | United States | No | |
| 12 | China Petrochemical Corporation | Oil and gas | 364 ▼ | 5.1 | 488,020 | China | Yes | |
| 13 | Volkswagen Group | Automotive | 363 ▲ | 8.3 | 628,890 | Germany | No | |
| 14 | Toyota | Automotive | 336 ▲ | 25.5 | 390,930 | Japan | No | |
| 15 | ExxonMobil | Oil and gas | 332 ▼ | 28.8 | 57,900 | United States | No | |
| 16 | Cencora | Healthcare | 321 ▲ | 1.6 | 49,000 | United States | No | |
| 17 | China State Construction Engineering | Construction | 290 ▼ | 3.1 | 370,270 | China | Yes | |
| 18 | Microsoft | Information technology | 282 ▲ | 102 | 228,000 | United States | No | |
| 19 | JPMorgan Chase | Financials | 280 ▲ | 57.0 | 318,510 | United States | No | |
| 20 | Costco | Retail | 275 ▲ | 8.1 | 341,000 | United States | No | |
| 21 | Cigna | Healthcare | 275 ▲ | 6.0 | 66,690 | United States | No | |
| 22 | Shell | Oil and gas | 274 ▼ | 17.8 | 85,000 | United Kingdom | No | |
| 23 | Foxconn | Electronics | 260 ▲ | 6.1 | 648,490 | Taiwan | No | |
| 24 | Glencore | Commodities | 248 ▲ | 0.36 | 80,420 | Switzerland | No | |
| 25 | Trafigura | Commodities | 240 ▼ | 2.7 | 14,480 | Singapore | No | |
| 26 | Samsung Electronics | Information technology | 235 ▲ | 31.1 | 259,150 | South Korea | No | |
| 27 | Cardinal Health | Healthcare | 223 ▼ | 1.6 | 55,390 | United States | No | |
| 28 | Nvidia | Semiconductors | 216 ▲ | 120 | 42,000 | United States | No | |
| 29 | Industrial and Commercial Bank of China | Financials | 211 ▼ | 51.3 | 409,758 | China | Yes | |
| 30 | Meta Platforms | Information technology | 201 ▲ | 60.5 | 78,860 | United States | No | |
| 31 | Elevance Health | Healthcare | 199 ▲ | 5.7 | 97,100 | United States | No | |
| 32 | Centene | Healthcare | 195 ▲ | −6.7 | 61,100 | United States | No | |
| 33 | BP | Oil and gas | 193 ▼ | 0.06 | 93,700 | United Kingdom | No | |
| 34 | Bank of America | Financials | 192 ▼ | 30.5 | 211,304 | United States | No | |
| 35 | Agricultural Bank of China | Financials | 191 ▼ | 40.5 | 457,835 | China | Yes | |
| 36 | Chevron | Oil and gas | 189 ▼ | 12.3 | 43,039 | United States | No | |
| 37 | China Construction Bank | Financials | 189 ▼ | 47.2 | 378,344 | China | Yes | |
| 38 | Ford Motor Company | Automotive | 187 ▲ | −8.2 | 169,000 | United States | No | |
| 39 | General Motors | Automotive | 185 ▼ | 2.7 | 156,000 | United States | No | |
| 40 | TotalEnergies | Oil and gas | 182 ▼ | 13.1 | 101,513 | France | No | |
| 41 | JD.com | Retail | 182 ▲ | 2.7 | 776,682 | China | No | |
| 42 | China Life Insurance | Financials | 178 ▲ | 3.5 | 175,710 | China | Yes | |
| 43 | Stellantis | Automotive | 173 ▼ | −25.2 | 259,206 | Netherlands | No | |
| 44 | Bank of China | Financials | 172 ▼ | 33.8 | 313,746 | China | Yes | |
| 45 | Citigroup | Financials | 168 ▼ | 14.3 | 219,000 | United States | No | |
| 46 | Home Depot | Retail | 165 ▲ | 14.2 | 472,400 | United States | No | |
| 47 | Fannie Mae | Financials | 159 ▲ | 14.4 | 7,000 | United States | No | |
| 48 | Ping An Insurance | Financials | 159 ▲ | 18.8 | 258,806 | China | No | |
| 49 | China Railway Engineering Corporation | Construction | 152 ▼ | 1.2 | 302,527 | China | Yes | |
| 50 | BMW Group | Automotive | 151 ▼ | 8.2 | 154,540 | Germany | No | |

== By country ==
Breakdown by country
| Rank | Country | Companies |
|---|---|---|
| 1 | United States | 26 |
| 2 | China | 12 |
| 3 | Germany | 2 |
| 3 | United Kingdom | 2 |
| 5 | France | 1 |
| 5 | Japan | 1 |
| 5 | Netherlands | 1 |
| 5 | Saudi Arabia | 1 |
| 5 | Singapore | 1 |
| 5 | South Korea | 1 |
| 5 | Switzerland | 1 |
| 5 | Taiwan | 1 |

== See also ==
- List of largest private non-governmental companies by revenue
- List of largest companies in Africa by revenue
- List of largest companies in Asia
- List of largest companies in Europe by revenue
- Forbes Global 2000
- List of largest employers
- List of public corporations by market capitalization
- List of most valuable brands
- List of companies by research and development spending
- List of wealthiest religious organizations
- List of the largest software companies
- List of largest Internet companies
- List of largest technology companies by revenue
- Largest airlines in the world
