= List of largest manufacturing companies by revenue =

The following is a list of the world's largest manufacturing companies, ordered by revenue in millions of U.S. dollars according to the Fortune Global 500. Currently the 50 biggest companies by revenue are included. Due to conglomerated nature of companies of this size, some holding companies may be indiscriminately exluded/included during classification as or despite being primarily engaged in service or resource extraction industry sectors. As such, placings should not be understood as definitive.

== 2025 ==
No.	Company	Industry	Revenue (in billion US$)	Headquarters
1	Apple	Electronics	391.035	United States
2	Volkswagen Group	Automotive	351.093	Germany
3	Toyota	Automotive	315.110	Japan
4	Samsung Electronics	Electronics	220.637	South Korea
5	Foxconn	Electronics	213.699	Taiwan
6	General Motors	Automotive	187.442	United States
7	Ford	Automotive	184.992	United States
8	Stellantis	Automotive	169.653	Netherlands
9	China Railway and Engineering Group	Engineering	161.337	China
10	Mercedes-Benz Group	Automotive	157.450	Germany
11	BMW	Automotive	153.974	Germany
12	Honda	Automotive	142.274	Japan
13	Nvidia	Semiconductors, various	130.497	United States
14	Hyundai Motor Company	Automotive	128.502	South Korea
15	Baowu	Metals	125.113	China
16	Mitsubishi	Engineering, various	122.127	Japan
17	Hengli Group	Chemicals, oils, polyester	121.126	China
18	Huawei	Telecommunications equipment, electronics	119.813	China
19	China Minmetals	Metals	115.806	China
20	BYD	Automotive, electronics	108.004	China
21	Nestlé	Food & beverages	103.750	Switzerland
22	Bosch	Engineering, various	97.702	Germany
23	Tesla	Automotive, various	97.690	United States
24	Dell Technologies	Electronics	95.567	United States
25	PepsiCo	Food & beverages	91.854	United States
26	Christian Dior	Luxury goods	91.579	France
27	Zhejiang Rongsheng Holding Group	Chemicals, oils, polyester	91.534	China
28	TSMC	Semiconductors	90.167	Taiwan
29	Johnson & Johnson	Pharmaceuticals	88.821	United States
30	COFCO Group	Food & beverages	88.260	China
31	SAIC Motor	Automotive	87.224	China
32	Archer Daniels Midland	Food & beverages	85.530	United States
33	Siemens	Engineering	85.433	Germany
34	Sony	Electronics	85.000	Japan
35	Procter & Gamble	Consumer goods	84.039	United States
36	Wuchan Zhongda Group	Tire & rubber, various	84.039	China
37	Nissan	Automotive	82.871	Japan
38	RTX Corporation	Aerospace & defense	80.738	United States
39	Geely	Automotive	79.891	China
40	Kia	Automotive	78.795	South Korea
41	Shenghong Holding Group	Chemicals, oils, polyester	78.612	China
42	FAW Group	Automotive	77.737	China
43	Jiangxi Copper	Metals	77.668	China
44	Shandong Weiqiao Pioneering Group	Textiles, metals, automotive	77.626	China
45	JBS N.V.	Food & beverages	77.183	Brazil
46	Airbus	Aerospace & defense	74.688	France
47	Lockheed Martin	Aerospace & defense	71.043	United States
48	Roche Group	Pharmaceuticals	70.861	Switzerland
49	BASF	Chemicals	70.574	Germany
50	Lenovo	Electronics	69.077	Hong Kong

== 2024 ==
No.	Company	Industry	Revenue (in billion US$)	Headquarters
1	Apple	Electronics, telecommunications equipment	274.515	United States
2	Toyota Group	Engineering, various	256.721	Japan
3	Volkswagen Group	Automotive	253.965	Germany
4	Samsung Electronics	Electronics, various	200.734	South Korea
5	Foxconn	Electronics	181.945	Taiwan
6	Mercedes-Benz Group	Automotive	175.827	Germany
7	Cardinal Health	Pharmaceuticals	152.922	United States
8	China Railway and Engineering Group	Engineering	141.383	China
9	Huawei	Telecommunications equipment, electronics	129.183	China
10	Ford	Automotive	127.144	United States
11	Honda	Automotive	124.240	Japan
12	General Motors	Automotive	122.485	United States
13	Mitsubishi	Engineering, various	121.542	Japan
14	BMW	Automotive	112.794	Germany
15	SAIC Motor	Automotive	107.555	China
16	China Minmetals	Metals	102.014	China
17	FAW Group	Automotive	101.075	China
18	Hengli Group	Textiles	100.773	China
19	Baowu	Steel	97.643	China
20	Dell	Electronics	94.224	United States
21	Nestlé	Food & beverages	89.852	Switzerland / United States
22	Hyundai Motor Company	Automotive	88.155	South Korea
23	Dongfeng Motor Group	Automotive	86.85	China
24	Sony	Electronics	84.893	Japan
25	Johnson & Johnson	Personal care products	82.344	United States
26	Hitachi	Engineering, various	82.334	Japan
27	Bosch	Engineering, various	81.463	Germany
28	General Electric	Engineering, various	79.619	United States
29	Intel	Electronics	77.867	United States
30	Sinopharm	Pharmaceuticals	77.278	China
31	Nissan	Automotive	74.169	Japan
32	Enel	Renewable energy	74.047	Italy
33	IBM	Engineering, various	73.620	United States
34	Beijing Automotive Group	Automotive	72.147	China
35	Procter & Gamble	Consumer goods	70.950	United States
36	PepsiCo	Food & beverages	70.387	United States
37	BASF	Chemicals	69.464	Germany
38	Aviation Industry Corporation of China	Aerospace & defense	66.964	China
39	Lockheed Martin	Aerospace & defense	65.398	United States
40	Hoffmann-La Roche	Pharmaceuticals	64.285	Switzerland
41	Siemens	Engineering, various	63.935	Germany
42	Sinochem	Chemicals	63.544	China
43	Panasonic	Engineering, various	63.191	Japan
44	Lenovo	Electronics	60.742	China / United States
45	ChemChina	Chemicals	60.491	China
46	Boeing	Aerospace & defense	58.158	United States
47	Unilever	Consumer goods	57.797	United Kingdom
48	Airbus	Aerospace & defense	56.872	France
49	HP	Electronics	56.639	United States
50	Raytheon Technologies	Engineering, various	56.587	United States

== 2020 ==
*Revenue with asterisk(s) are not found or confused according to Fortune Global 500 in the year 2020.

No.	Company	Industry	Revenue (in billion US$)	Headquarters
1	Volkswagen Group	Automotive	282.7	Germany
2	Toyota Group	Engineering, various	265.172*	Japan
3	Apple	Electronics, telecommunications equipment	260.174	United States
4	Samsung Electronics	Electronics, various	197.705	South Korea
5	Daimler	Automotive	193.346	Germany
6	Foxconn	Electronics	172.869	Taiwan
7	Ford	Automotive	155.900	United States
8	Cardinal Health	Pharmaceuticals	145.534	United States
9	Honda	Automotive	137.332	Japan
10	General Motors	Automotive	137.237	United States
11	Mitsubishi	Engineering, various	135.940	Japan
12	Huawei	Telecommunications equipment, electronics	124.316	China
13	China Railway and Engineering Group	Engineering	123.324	China
14	SAIC Motor	Automotive	122.071	China
15	BMW	Automotive	116.638	Germany
16	Siemens	Engineering, various	97.937	Germany
17	General Electric	Engineering, various	95.214	United States
18	Dell	Electronics	92.154	United States
19	Nestlé	Food & beverages	92.107	Switzerland
20	Nissan	Automotive	90.863	Japan
21	Hyundai Motor Company	Automotive	90.740	South Korea
22	Enel	Renewable energy	89.907	Italy
23	FAW Group	Automotive	89.417	China
24	China Minmetals	Metals	88.357	China
25	Bosch	Engineering, various	86.990	Germany
26	Dongfeng Motor Group	Automotive	84.049	China
27	Peugeot	Automotive	83.643	France
28	Johnson & Johnson	Personal care products	82.059	United States
29	Hitachi	Engineering, various	80.639	Japan
30	Hengli Group	Textiles	80.588	China
31	Sinochem	Chemicals	80.376	China
32	Baowu	Steel	79.932	China
33	Eni	Oil & gas	79.513	Italy
34	Airbus	Aerospace & defense	78.883	France
35	IBM	Engineering, various	77.147	United States
36	Boeing	Aerospace & defense	76.559	United States
37	Sony	Electronics	75.972	Japan
38	Beijing Automotive Group	Automotive	72.554	China
39	Intel	Electronics	71.965	United States
40	BASF	Chemicals	70.723	Germany
41	Sinopharm	Pharmaceuticals	70.690	China
42	ArcelorMittal	Steel	70.615	Luxembourg
43	Panasonic	Engineering, various	68.897	Japan
44	Norinco	Aerospace & defense	68.714	China
45	Procter & Gamble	Consumer goods	67.684	United States
46	PepsiCo	Food & beverages	67.161	United States
47	Aviation Industry Corporation of China	Aerospace & defense	65.909	China
48	ChemChina	Chemicals	65.767	China
57	Hoffmann-La Roche	Pharmaceuticals	56.634*	Switzerland
49	DowDuPont	Chemicals	62.683*	United States
50	Renault	Automotive	62.160	France
51	Christian Dior	Luxury goods	60.071	France
52	United Technologies	Engineering, various	59.837*	United States
53	Lockheed Martin	Aerospace & defense	59.812	United States
54	Hewlett-Packard	Electronics	58.756	United States
55	Unilever	Consumer goods	58.179	United Kingdom
56	China National Building Material Group	Building materials, glass	57.626	China
58	POSCO	Steel	55.592	South Korea
59	Nippon Steel	Steel	54.465	Japan
60	Caterpillar	Construction equipment	53.800	United States
61	Anheuser-Busch InBev	Food & beverages	53.723	Belgium
62	Guangzhou Automobile Industry Group	Automotive	53.662	China
63	LG Electronics	Electronics	53.464	South Korea
64	Cisco Systems	Telecommunications equipment	51.904	United States
65	JBS S.A.	Food & beverages	51.859	Brazil
66	Bayer	Pharmaceuticals	51.807	Germany
67	Pfizer	Pharmaceuticals	51.750	United States
68	Aluminum Corporation of China	Aluminium	51.649	China
69	Hesteel Group	Metals	51.345	China
70	Lenovo	Electronics	50.716	China
71	Novartis	Pharmaceuticals	50.486	Switzerland
72	Kia Motors	Automotive	49.894	South Korea
73	Continental	Tyres	49.783	Germany
74	Mitsui	Engineering, various	48.880	Japan
75	Geely	Automotive	47.886	China
76	Saint-Gobain	Building materials	47.650	France
77	Denso	Engineering, various	47.400	Japan
78	ThyssenKrupp	Steel	47.358	Germany
79	Merck & Co.	Pharmaceuticals	46.840	United States
80	Volvo	Automotive	45.690	Sweden
81	China Shipbuilding Industry Corporation	Shipbuilding	44.431*	China
82	Pegatron	Electronics	44.207	Taiwan
83	Sinomach	Industrial machinery	43.122	China
84	GlaxoSmithKline	Pharmaceuticals	43.073	United Kingdom
85	Wilmar International	Food & beverages	42.641	Singapore
86	Tyson Foods	Food & beverages	42.405	United States
87	Sanofi	Pharmaceuticals	42.119	France
88	Bunge Limited	Food, beverages & tobacco	41.140	United States
89	Mitsubishi Electric	Engineering, various	41.045	Japan
90	Jardine Matheson	Conglomerate	40.922	Hong Kong
91	ZF Friedrichshafen	Motor vehicles & parts	40.873	Germany
92	Shandong Weiqiao Pioneering Group	Textiles	40.426	China
93	SABIC	Chemicals	39.939*	Saudi Arabia
94	Mitsubishi Heavy Industries	Engineering, various	39.506	Japan
95	Magna International	Motor vehicles & parts	39.431	Canada
96	Oracle Corporation	Electronics	37.728	United States
97	Tata Motors	Automotive	37.242	India
98	Honeywell	Engineering, various	36.709	United States
99	Fujitsu	Electronics	35.483	Japan
100	China South Industries Group	Automotive, electronics	29.063	China

== See also ==
- Economy of the United States
- List of largest employers
- List of largest private non-governmental companies by revenue
- List of the largest software companies
- List of largest Internet companies
- List of largest companies by revenue
- List of largest technology companies by revenue
- List of manufacturing occupations
