= List of largest private non-governmental companies by revenue =

This is a list of the world's largest non-governmental privately held companies by revenue. This list does not include state-owned enterprises like Sinopec, State Grid, China National Petroleum, Kuwait Petroleum Corporation, Pemex, Petrobras, PDVSA and others. These corporations have revenues of at least US$10 billion.

== Largest private non-governmental companies by revenue ==
No.	Company	Revenue (in billions of USD)	Headquarters	Founded
1	Vitol	400 (2023)	Switzerland	1966
2	Trafigura Group	244.3 (2023)	Singapore	1993
3	Schwarz Group	180.6 (2023)	Germany	1930
4	Cargill	160 (2023/24)	United States	1865
5	Koch, Inc.	125 (2021)	United States	1940
6	Aldi	120.96 (2023)	Germany	1946
7	Suning Holdings Group	102.9 (2019/20)	China	1990
8	Huawei	99 (2023)	China	1987
9	Robert Bosch	98.92 (2023)	Germany	1886
10	REWE Group	90,8 (2026)	Germany	1927
11	Amer International Group	88.9 (2019)	China	1995
12	HNA Group	88.5 (2018)	China	2000
13	ByteDance	85.2 (2022) *	China	2012
14	Groupe BPCE	82,8 (2026)	France	2009
15	State Farm	82.2 (2021)	United States	1922
16	Hengli Group	80.6 (2019)	China	1994
17	Pacific Construction Group	77.07 (2021)	China	1986
18	Crédit Mutuel	69,2 (2026)	France	2009
19	Deloitte	67.2 (2024)	United Kingdom	1845
20	E.Leclerc	66,8 (2026)	France	1948
21	Ineos	65 (2021)	United Kingdom	1998
22	CMA CGM	56 (2021)	France	1978
23	PwC	55.2 (2024)	United Kingdom	1998
24	Auchan Holding	54.7 (2019)	France	1961
25	Edeka Zentrale	54,5 (2026)	Germany	1898
26	EY	51.2 (2024)	United Kingdom	1989
27	Nationwide	49,7 (2026)	United States	1926
28	Zheijiang Geely Holding Group	47.89 (2019)	China	1986
29	Ingram Micro	47.2 (2019)	United States	1979
30	SPAR	46.98 (2022)	Netherlands	1932
31	IKEA	45.4 (2018/19)	Sweden	1943
32	Liberty Mutual Insurance Group	45,9 (2026)	United States	1912
33	Massachusetts Mutual Life Insurance	43,5 (2026)	United States	1851
34	New York Life Insurance Company	44.2 (2019)	United States	1845
35	Cedar Holdings Group	41.3 (2019)	China	1997
36	ZF Friedrichshafen	40.9 (2019)	Germany	1915
37	TIAA	40.5 (2019)	United States	1918
38	Shandong Weiqiao Pioneering Group	40.4 (2019)	China	1951
39	DZ Bank	39.1 (2019)	Germany	2001
40	Nippon Life Insurance	38,6 (2026)	Japan	1889
41	Coop Group	38,6 (2026)	Switzerland	1969
42	Publix Super Markets	38.5 (2019)	United States	1930
43	KPMG	38.4 (2024)	United Kingdom	1987
44	Tsingshan Holding Group	38 (2019)	China	1992
45	Massachusetts Mutual Life Insurance Company	37.3 (2019)	United States	1851
46	Mars	37 (2019)	United States	1911
47	Tech Data	37 (2019/20)	United States	1974
48	Jiangsu Shagang Group	36.5 (2019)	China	1975
49	Les Mousquetaires	35.9 (2019)	France	1969
50	Yango Longking Group	35.9 (2019)	China	1995
51	USAA	35.6 (2019)	United States	1922
52	Migros Group	35,6 (2026)	Switzerland	1925
53	Reyes Holdings	35 (2019)	United States	1976
54	Rabobank	35 (2026)	Netherlands	
55	GuideWell	32.9 (2024)	United States	1944
56	Louis Dreyfus Company	33.8 (2019)	France	1851
57	Northwestern Mutual	32.3 (2019)	United States	1857
58	Groupe Casino	32.1 (2021)	France	1898
59	Sumitomo Life Insurance	32.1 (2019/20)	Japan	1907
60	Wanda Group	31.7 (2018)	China	1988
61	H-E-B	31.2 (2018/19)	United States	1905
62	Phoenix Pharma	30.5 (2019/20)	Germany	1994
63	Pilot Flying J	29.5 (2019)	United States	1981
64	Taikang Insurance Group	29.5 (2019)	China	1996
65	Asda	29.39 (2024)	United Kingdom	1942
66	Zenkyoren	29,1 (2026)	Japan	
67	Xinjiang Guanghui Industry Investment Group	28.7 (2019)	China	1989
68	GS Caltex	28.5 (2019)	South Korea	1967
69	Huaxia Life Insurance	28.49 (2019)	China	2006
70	Desjardins Group	28,4 (2026)	Canada	
71	Mercadona	28 (2019)	Spain	1977
72	Système U	28,0 (2026)	France	1894
73	Hailiang Group	27.2 (2019)	China	1989
74	EG Group	28.3 (2023)	United Kingdom	2001
75	BayWa	25,9 (2026)	Germany	
76	C&S Wholesale Grocers	25.8 (2018/19)	United States	1918
77	Heraeus	25.1 (2019)	Germany	1851
78	Achmea	24,8 (2026)	Netherlands	1995
79	Meiji Yasuda Life Insurance	23,7 (2026)	Japan	2004
80	Enterprise Holdings	22.5 (2019/20)	United States	1969
81	Ferrero	22.4 (2025)	Italy	1946
82	Bechtel	21.8 (2019)	United States	1898
83	Dairy Farmers of America	21,7 (2026)	USA	
84	Conad	21,6 (2026)	Italy	
85	Norinchukin Bank	21,5 (2026)	Japan	
86	Boehringer Ingelheim	21.3 (2019)	Germany	1885
87	Cox Enterprises	21.1 (2019)	United States	1898
88	Greenergy	21.1 (2019)	United Kingdom	1992
89	Fidelity Investments	20.9 (2019)	United States	1946
90	Love's Travel Stops & Country Stores	20.6 (2019)	United States	1964
91	Southern Glazer's Wine & Spirits	20 (2019)	United States	1968
92	Wakefern Food Corporation	19.6 (2022/23)	United States	1946
93	Unimed	19,5 (2026)	Brazil	
94	Swire	18.4 (2024)	United Kingdom	1816
95	Groupama	18,4 (2026)	France	
96	Covéa	18,3 (2026)	France	
97	John Lewis Partnership	18.1 (2024)	United Kingdom	1929
98	Meijer	18.1 (2019/20)	United States	1934
99	Allied Universal	18.0 (2020)	United States	2016
100	Andel Group	18,0 (2026)	Denmark	
101	JM Family Enterprises	17.7 (2019)	United States	1968
102	Coop Italia	17,7 (2026)	Italy	
103	Octopus Group	17.2 (2023)	United Kingdom	2000
104	World Wide Technology	17.0 (2022)	United States	1990
105	Aéma Groupe	16,5 (2026)	France	
106	Subway	16.1 (2019)	United States	1965
107	S Group	15,9 (2026)	Finland	
108	Chanel	15.6 (2021)	France	1910
109	Gordon Food Service	15.5 (2018/19)	United States	1897
110	VGZ	14,9 (2026)	Netherlands	
111	Inspire Brands	14.6 (2020)	United States	2018
112	Royal London Group	14,5 (2026)<	UK	
113	Turner Construction	14.4 (2020)	United States	1901
114	The Co-operative Group	14,1 (2026)	UK	
115	Land O' Lakes	13.95 (2020)	United States	1921
116	Medline Industries	13.9 (2019)	United States	1966
117	Debeka	13,8 (2026)	Germany	
118	Trader Joe's	13.7 (2019)	United States	1958
119	Allegis Group	13.6 (2019)	United States	1984
120	The Guardian Life Insurance Company of America	13.56 (2020)	United States	1860
121	CZ Group	13,5 (2026)	Netherlands	
122	In Vivo	13,4 (2026)	France	
123	OpenAI	13.1 (2025) **	United States	2015
124	American Family Insurance Group	13.07 (2020)	United States	1927
125	Wawa	13 (2019)	United States	1964
126	Kingston Technology	12.8 (2019)	United States	1985
127	Racetrac	12.6 (2019)	United States	1934
128	OP Financial Group	12,6 (2026)<	Finland	
129	Kiewit Corporation (Peter Kiewit Sons')	12.46 (2020)	United States	1932
130	Menzis	11,9 (2026)	Netherlands	
131	Farmers Insurance Exchange	11.87 (2020)	United States	1928
132	ABC Supply	11.6 (2019)	United States	1982
133	Hearst Corporation	11.5 (2019)	United States	1887
134	Decathlon	11.4 (2020)	France	1976
135	Chick-fil-A	11.3 (2019)	United States	1976
136	QuikTrip	11.2 (2019/20)	United States	1958
137	Wegmans	11.2 (2021)	United States	1916
138	Mutual of Omaha Insurance	11.1 (2020)	United States	1909
139	Republic National Distributing Company	11.0 (2019)	United States	1996
140	Graybar	11.0 (2023) **	United States	1869
141	Copersugar	10,8 (2026)	Brasil	
142	SHI International Corp	10.7 (2019)	United States	1989
143	Colruyt Group	10,7 (2026)	Belgium	
144	Menards	10.7 (2019)	United States	1960
145	Bloomberg	10.5 (2019)	United States	1981
146	S. C. Johnson & Son	10.5 (2019/20)	United States	1886
147	McKinsey	10.5 (2019)	United States	1929
148	The Whiting-Turner Contracting Company	10.3 (2019)	United States	1909
149	Jones Financial (Edward Jones)	10.17 (2020)	United States	1922
150	Hy-Vee	10.1 (2019	United States	1930
151	Calpine	10.1 (2019)	United States	1984
152	Pacific Life	10.06 (2020)	United States	1868

== See also ==
- List of largest companies by revenue
- List of largest companies in the United States by revenue
- List of largest manufacturing companies by revenue
- List of largest corporate profits and losses
- List of largest oil and gas companies by revenue
- Government-owned corporation
- State ownership
