= Yango Longking Group =

- Company type: Private
- Industry: environmental protection, education, real estate, finance, international trade
- Founded: 1995; 31 years ago
- Headquarters: Fuzhou and Shanghai, China
- Area served: Worldwide
- Key people: Lin Tengjiao (CEO)
- Revenue: US$36.3 billion (2021)
- Number of employees: 28,670 (2021)
- Website: yangoholdings.com

Yango Longking Group
- Traditional Chinese: 陽光龍淨集團有限公司
- Simplified Chinese: 阳光龙净集团有限公司
- Literal meaning: Sunshine Longjing Group Company Limited
Transcriptions
Standard Mandarin
- Hanyu Pinyin: Yángguāng lóng jìng jítuán yǒuxiàn gōngsī
- IPA: [jǎŋ.kwáŋ lʊ̌ŋ.tɕîŋ]

The Yango Longking Group (Chinese: 阳光龙净) is a Chinese private company active in the financial and construction industry.

Yango Longking was founded in 1995 as Yango Financial Holding Investment Group Co., Ltd, adopting its current name in 2018. Its headquarters are in the Fuzhou International Finance Center and North Bund, Shanghai.

Yango Longking was ranked 332nd in the Fortune Global 500 for 2021.

The company received a bailout from the state-owned China Huarong Asset Management in August 2022, in what was described by the South China Morning Post as "the result of Beijing seeking the stabilisation of the property market."
