= CR5 =

CR5 may refer to:

- China Railway No.5 Engineering Group, a subsidiary of the transport construction conglomerate, China Railway Group Limited
- CR5, a CR postcode area covering Coulsdon, Old Coulsdon, Chipstead, Hooley, Netherne-on-the-Hill, part of Woodmansterne, and Clockhouse
- Pasir Ris MRT station, MRT station code
