= Sydney Park (disambiguation) =

Sydney Park is a recreational area in Sydney, New South Wales, Australia.

Sydney Park may also refer to:

- Sydney Olympic Park, a suburb of Greater Western Sydney
- Sydney Park (actress) (born 1997), American actress
