= Shenghong Holding Group =

Chinese petrochemical and textile conglomerate

Shenghong Holding Group Co., Ltd.
- Native name: 盛虹控股集团有限公司
- Type: Private
- Industry: Petrochemicals; Chemical fibres Textiles; New energy materials
- Founded: 1992
- Headquarters: Suzhou, Jiangsu, China
- Revenue: US$81.81 billion (2025)
- Net income: US$491.4 million (2025)
- Website: www.shenghongholding.com/en/

Shenghong Holding Group Co., Ltd. (Chinese: 盛虹控股集团有限公司), also known as Shenghong Group, is a privately owned Chinese industrial energy Conglomerate headquartered in Suzhou, Jiangsu. Founded in 1992, it is a Fortune Global 500 company.
