= Fan Hongwei =

Chinese entrepreneur and billionaire

- 范红卫
- Born: February 1967 (age 59); Jiangsu Province
- Occupation: CEO of Hengli Petrochemical
- Spouse: Chen Jianhua (陈建华)
- Children: Chen Yiting (陈逸婷)

Fan Hongwei (simplified Chinese: 范红卫; traditional Chinese: 范紅衛; pinyin: Fàn Hóngwèi; born February 1967) is a Chinese entrepreneur and billionaire who is the chair and CEO of the chemical fiber company Hengli Petrochemical (恒力石化) and vice chair of its holding company Hengli Group (恒力集团). She was the fourth richest woman in China in 2019.

== Early life and education ==
Fan was born in February 1967 in Jiangsu Province, China. She attended Nanjing Normal University.

== Career ==
Fan started her career as an accountant.

In 1994, Fan and her husband Chen Jianhua (陈建华) took out a CN¥ 3,000,000 loan to buy Wujiang Chemical Fibre Textile Factory (吴江化纤织造厂), a failing textile factory in Wujiang, Suzhou. Fan took over the factory as general manager, and she and Chen restructured the company and grew it from a factory with 27 employees into the largest fiber producer in China and one of the largest weaving companies in the world.

The company is now known as Hengli Group, and its main unit is Hengli Petrochemical. According to the company, Hengli Petrochemical became publicly traded through a backdoor listing on the Shanghai Stock Exchange in 2016. In 2019, Hengli Group earned more than ¥500 billion in revenue. Its activities include refining petroleum to produce polyester, manufacturing chemical fibers, and real estate. It mainly serves the apparel industry, but also produces chips and filaments for packaging, electronics, and pharmaceuticals. It has factories in Nantong, Suqian, and Suzhou.

Fan owns a 45% stake in Hengli Petrochemical. In 2020, Forbes estimated her and her family's net worth at US$6 billion. As of 2021, her net worth is estimated at US$23 billion.

== Recognition ==
In 2020 she was included on Forbes's list of the 50 top CEOs in China and on Fortune's list of the 50 most influential business leaders in China. The same year, she was ranked sixth on Hurun's list of the world's richest self-made women, with an estimated net worth of ¥53 billion.

In 2021, Forbes listed her as one of China's 20 top businesswomen.

China Daily has listed her as one of the ten richest women in China three times: she was ranked fifth in 2018, fourth in 2019, and seventh in 2020.

== Personal life ==
Fan's husband Chen Jianhua (陈建华) is also a billionaire. He is the chair and director of Hengli Group. Their daughter Chen Yiting (陈逸婷), born in 1993, is a director of Tongli Lake Travel (同里旅游), a subsidiary of Hengli Group.

Fan lives in Suzhou.

== See also ==
- List of female billionaires
- Petrochemical industry
