= Hailiang Group =

Chinese private company

- Type: Private
- Industry: environmental protection, education, real estate, finance, international trade, mining
- Founded: 1989; 37 years ago
- Headquarters: Hangzhou, China
- Area served: Worldwide
- Key people: Wang Lihong (CEO)
- Revenue: US$31 billion (2021)
- Number of employees: 24,058 (2021)
- Website: hailiang.com

Hailiang Group
- Traditional Chinese: 海亮集團有限公司
- Simplified Chinese: 海亮集团有限公司
- Literal meaning: Sea Light Group Company Limited
Transcriptions
Standard Mandarin
- Hanyu Pinyin: Hǎi Liàng jítuán yǒuxiàn gōngsī
- IPA: [xàɪ.ljâŋ]

The Hailiang Group (Chinese: 海亮集团; pinyin: Hǎiliàng Jítuán) is a Chinese private company with diversified operations in non-ferrous metals (particularly copper), construction, ecological agriculture, environmental protection, private education, finance, and real estate.

Founded in 1989 in Zhuji, Zhejiang Province, as a small copper tube plant, Hailiang has grown into one of China's largest private conglomerates. It was ranked 459th in the Fortune Global 500 for 2021. In a ranking of China's top 500 enterprises, it was listed 16th.

Its private education arm, Hailiang Education Group Inc., is listed on the Nasdaq with the ticker symbol HLG.

== Operations ==
=== Metals and Mining ===
The non-ferrous metals segment, particularly copper processing and trade, is the core of Hailiang Group's industrial portfolio. The group controls Zhejiang Hailiang Co., Ltd. (SZSE: 002203), a publicly listed copper products manufacturer that is among the largest producers of copper pipes and tubes in the world.

Hailiang has invested in copper mining and upstream raw material sourcing both domestically and abroad. In 2020, Zhejiang Hailiang announced a USD 1 billion investment into developing a high-grade copper mine in the DRC, including infrastructure and ore processing facilities.

=== Education and Services ===
Hailiang Education operates K–12 schools and bilingual international academies across several provinces in China. It has also begun expanding into Southeast Asia. As of 2021, it served over 67,000 students.

=== Real Estate and Environmental Protection ===
The group has projects in high-end residential real estate and commercial complexes, mostly concentrated in the Yangtze River Delta. In environmental services, Hailiang has developed water treatment and solid waste recycling platforms through its subsidiaries and partnerships.
