= Executive Order 13902 =

2020 U.S. executive order imposing Iran-related sanctions

- Imposing Sanctions With Respect to Additional Sectors of Iran
- Type: Executive order
- Number: 13902
- President: Donald Trump
- Signed: January 10, 2020

Federal Register details
- Federal Register document number: 2020-00534
- Publication date: January 14, 2020
- Document citation: 85 FR 2003

Summary
- Authorizes sanctions on persons operating in designated sectors of the Iranian economy

Executive Order 13902, titled Imposing Sanctions With Respect to Additional Sectors of Iran, is an executive order signed by President Donald Trump on January 10, 2020. The order authorizes sanctions on persons operating in designated sectors of the Iranian economy and permits the United States Secretary of the Treasury, in consultation with the United States Secretary of State, to identify additional sectors subject to sanctions.

The order initially applied to Iran's construction, mining, manufacturing, and textiles sectors. It was later used as authority for sanctions involving Iran's financial sector in 2020 and petroleum and petrochemical sectors in 2024. Analysts have described the order as part of the Trump administration's broader "maximum pressure" campaign against Iran and as an expansion of U.S. sector-based and secondary sanctions.

== Background ==
Executive Order 13902 followed heightened tensions between the United States and Iran in January 2020. Iran Watch, a publication of the Wisconsin Project on Nuclear Arms Control, stated that Iran fired ballistic missiles at two bases in Iraq used by U.S. forces after the U.S. killing of Iranian general Qasem Soleimani, and that the January 10, 2020 sanctions package was announced in response to the missile attack. The Congressional Research Service similarly characterized the order as a response to Iranian missile strikes on an Iraqi base used by U.S. forces.

On the same day the order was signed, the U.S. Department of the Treasury announced sanctions against senior Iranian officials, Iranian metals producers and mining companies, and a network involved in Iranian metals trade. Treasury stated that the new executive order expanded authorities to target additional sources of revenue used by the Iranian government.

Iran Watch described the January 10 measures as a three-part sanctions package consisting of Treasury designations against metals-related entities, a State Department determination under the Iran Freedom and Counter-Proliferation Act, and Executive Order 13902's new sectoral sanctions on construction, mining, manufacturing, and textiles. The order followed previous sanctions on Iran's metals sector under Executive Order 13871, issued in 2019 after the United States withdrew from the Joint Comprehensive Plan of Action.

== Legal authority and provisions ==
Executive Order 13902 cites several legal authorities, including the International Emergency Economic Powers Act, the National Emergencies Act, section 212(f) of the Immigration and Nationality Act of 1952, and section 301 of title 3 of the United States Code. The order takes additional steps under the national emergency first declared in Executive Order 12957 in 1995. In March 2026, the president continued that national emergency for one year beyond March 15, 2026; the continuation notice listed Executive Order 13902 among the additional steps taken under the emergency.

Section 1 blocks all property and interests in property under United States jurisdiction of persons determined to operate in the construction, mining, manufacturing, or textiles sectors of the Iranian economy, or in any other Iranian economic sector later designated by the Secretary of the Treasury in consultation with the Secretary of State. It also applies to persons who knowingly engage in significant transactions involving significant goods or services connected to those sectors, materially support blocked persons, or are owned or controlled by or acting for blocked persons.

Section 2 authorizes sanctions on foreign financial institutions that knowingly conduct or facilitate significant financial transactions involving designated Iranian sectors or persons blocked under the order. Such sanctions may include prohibiting or imposing strict conditions on the maintenance of correspondent accounts or payable-through accounts in the United States. Legal analysts at Norton Rose Fulbright described the order as having implications for both U.S. and non-U.S. persons engaged in activity involving the covered Iranian sectors.

The order also bars entry into the United States for persons who meet the criteria for sanctions under section 1, subject to exceptions determined by the Secretary of State. It prohibits efforts to evade or avoid the order and authorizes the Treasury Secretary, in consultation with the Secretary of State, to issue regulations and take other actions necessary to implement it.

The prohibitions in the order do not apply to transactions for the provision, including sale, of agricultural commodities, food, medicine, or medical devices to Iran.

== Implementation and guidance ==
The Office of Foreign Assets Control (OFAC) subsequently issued guidance defining the original sectors covered by the order and, after the 2020 determination, the financial sector. OFAC described the covered sectors as including construction, mining, manufacturing, textiles-related activity, and financial-sector activity in Iran.

OFAC stated that persons in Iran manufacturing medicines, medical devices, sanitation and hygiene products, medical safety products, personal protective equipment, and similar items solely for use in Iran and not for export would not be treated as operating in the manufacturing sector for purposes of Executive Order 13902. OFAC also stated that transactions for the provision of agricultural commodities, food, medicine, or medical devices to Iran would not be subject to sanctions under Executive Order 13902, while separately noting that humanitarian transactions can still be restricted when they involve persons designated under other sanctions authorities or activity otherwise subject to sanctions.

Reuters reported in June 2020 that OFAC guidance exempted Iran-based manufacturers of medicines, medical devices, personal protective equipment, sanitation products, and similar essential goods for domestic use from being treated as operating in Iran's manufacturing sector under the order. The report described the guidance as coming amid broader concerns that U.S. sanctions could impede Iran's access to medicine, medical supplies, and other essentials during the COVID-19 pandemic.

== Later sector determinations ==
On October 8, 2020, the Secretary of the Treasury, in consultation with the Secretary of State, identified the financial sector of the Iranian economy as an additional sector under Executive Order 13902. OFAC simultaneously sanctioned eighteen major Iranian banks, including sixteen banks for operating in Iran's financial sector, one bank for being owned or controlled by a sanctioned Iranian bank, and one military-affiliated bank under a separate counter-proliferation authority. Treasury stated that the action did not affect existing authorizations and exceptions for humanitarian trade.

Reuters reported that the 2020 financial-sector sanctions extended secondary-sanctions risk to foreign banks dealing with the targeted institutions, and cited analysts who said the action could further deter European and other foreign banks from handling even permitted humanitarian transactions involving Iran. Iran Watch described the financial-sector determination as combining sector-based sanctions with secondary sanctions, potentially affecting non-U.S. entities that continued to transact with Iranian financial institutions.

On October 11, 2024, the Secretary of the Treasury, in consultation with the State Department, determined that section 1(a)(i) of Executive Order 13902 would apply to the petroleum and petrochemical sectors of the Iranian economy. Treasury described the action as a response to Iran's October 1, 2024 attack on Israel and stated that the determination allowed Treasury to target a broader range of activity related to Iran's trade in petroleum and petrochemical products.

Reuters and the Associated Press reported that the 2024 expansion targeted Iran's energy revenues and included measures against vessels and companies associated with networks used to transport Iranian oil.

Treasury continued to use Executive Order 13902's petroleum-sector authority in later Iran-related designations. In April 2025, Treasury designated Shandong Shengxing Chemical Co., Ltd., a China-based independent refinery, for operating in the petroleum sector of the Iranian economy. In April 2026, Treasury said another action was taken pursuant to Executive Order 13902 and targeted persons operating in Iran's petroleum and petrochemical sectors. OFAC also published time-limited general licenses in 2026 authorizing certain safety, environmental, and cargo-offloading transactions that would otherwise have been prohibited by Executive Order 13902.

== Analysis and reaction ==
The order and later sector determinations drew analysis concerning their secondary-sanctions effects. Iran Watch stated that the January 2020 order would largely affect parties outside the United States because of the long-standing embargo on U.S. trade with Iran, and that the order gave the Treasury Secretary discretionary authority to expand sanctions to additional Iranian economic sectors. The Congressional Research Service described the order as expanding Iranian industrial sectors subject to U.S. sanctions and noted that foreign banks conducting transactions with the covered sectors could be barred from the U.S. financial system.

The 2020 financial-sector determination generated debate over humanitarian trade. Writing in Just Security, sanctions lawyer Shahrzad Noorbaloochi argued that the financial-sector sanctions would undermine humanitarian trade with Iran by increasing secondary-sanctions risk for non-U.S. financial institutions. By contrast, Richard Goldberg and Mark Dubowitz of the Foundation for Defense of Democracies argued before the designation that applying Executive Order 13902 to Iran's financial sector would not interfere with humanitarian trade because the order contained an exemption for humanitarian transactions and because Treasury had established mechanisms intended to facilitate such trade.

== See also ==
- United States sanctions against Iran
- International sanctions against Iran
- Executive Order 12957
- Executive Order 13846
- Executive Order 13871
- Office of Foreign Assets Control
- Iran–United States relations
