= Sydney Park =

Park in Sydney, New South Wales, Australia

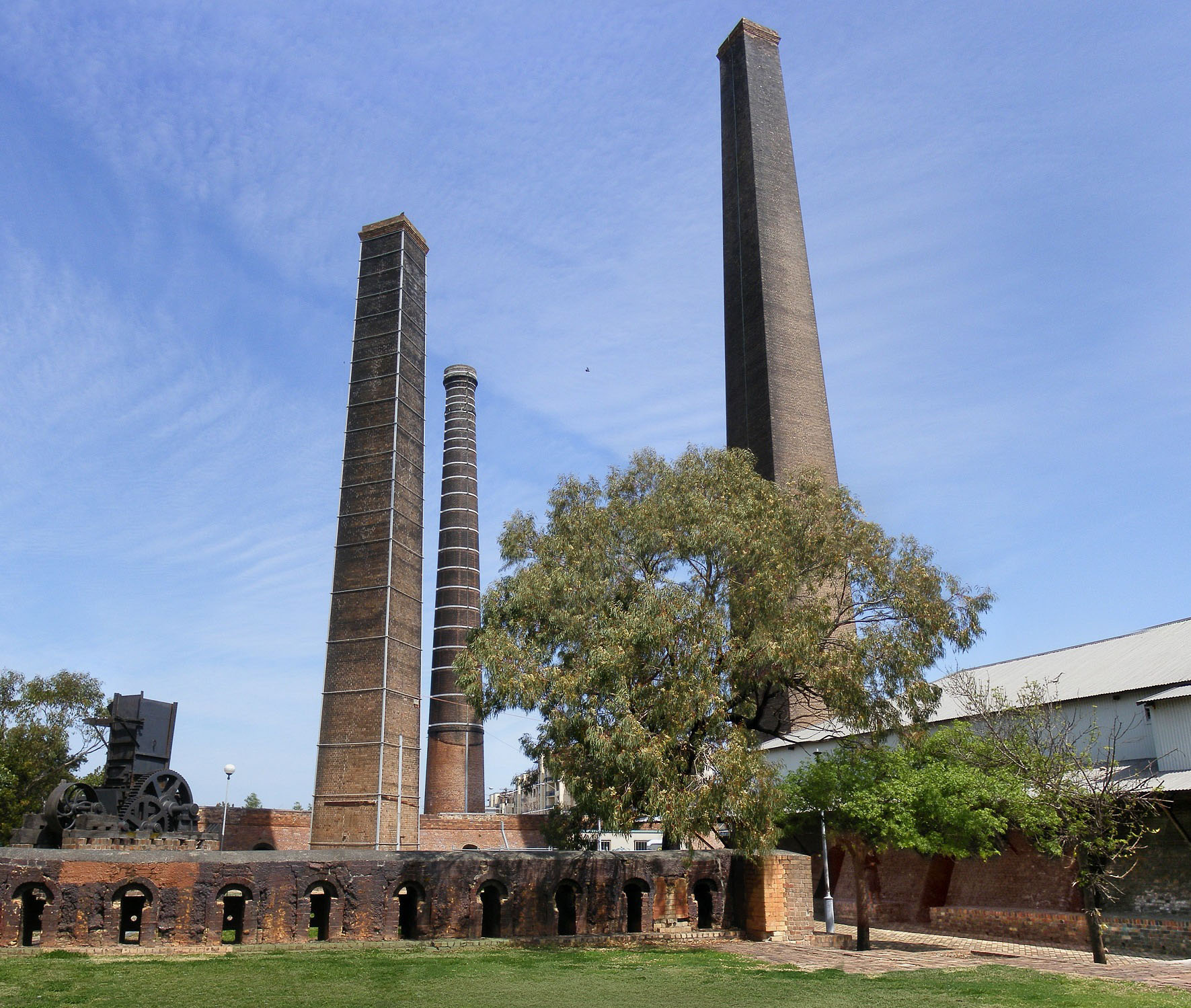
- Former Austral brick works at Sydney Park
- Interactive map of Sydney Park
- Location: Sydney Park Road, Alexandria, New South Wales, Australia
- Nearest city: Sydney
- Coordinates: 33°54′38″S 151°11′05″E
- Area: 41.6 hectares (103 acres)
- Created: 11 February 1991
- Operator: City of Sydney
- Open: 24 hours
- Status: Open all year
- Public transit: : /: St Peters; : n/a; : Routes #422; #308; #348; #370; : n/a

New South Wales Heritage Database (Local Government Register)
- Official name: Former Bedford Brickworks Group Including Chimneys, Kilns and Grounds; Austral Brickworks
- Type: Local government (built)
- Criteria: a., b., c., d., e., g.
- Designated: 14 December 2012
- Reference no.: I27
- Group: Manufacturing and Processing
- Category: Industrial Office/Admin Building

Sydney Park is a 41.6-hectare (103-acre) recreational area in the inner-city area of Sydney, New South Wales, Australia. The parkland is located in the suburb of Alexandria, sitting along the borders with Newtown and Erskineville.

Sydney Park is the third largest park in inner-city Sydney. The park comprises large open recreation spaces with distinctive hills that provide 360 degree views over Sydney, a children's playground, wetlands, a sports oval (Alan Davidson Oval), a children's bicycle track, sculptures, a heritage area featuring the remains of the brickworks that formerly occupied part of the site, and the AIDS Memorial Grove. The former brickworks area of the park is listed on the City of Sydney local government heritage list.

== History ==
Prior to British settlement, the north-western part of the present park area would have been a forest of turpentine and ironbark trees, grading down towards the south-eastern area, situated on Botany Sands, which would have been swamp, marsh and heathland associated with the waterway that became known as Shea's Creek. The woodland area was first cleared by Thomas Smyth, a marine sergeant with the First Fleet, who planted fruit trees and grain crops.

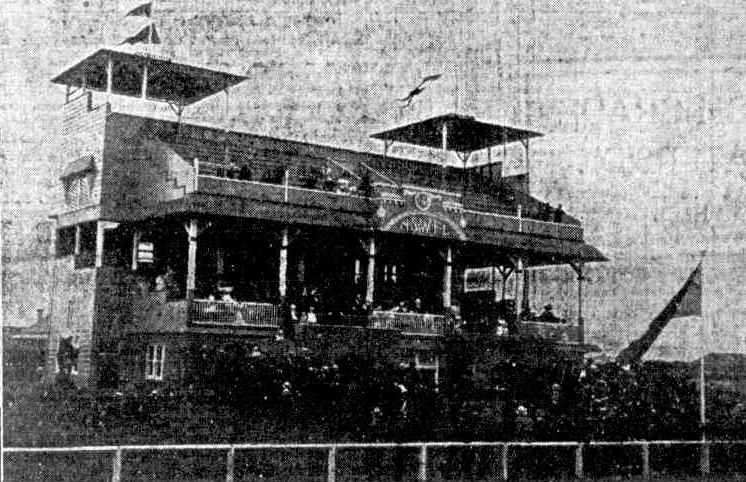
The New South Wales Football League grandstand at the park's Oval in 1912

The north-west part of the park is situated over a bed of Wianamatta shale which became a valuable source of brick-making clay. It also encouraged tall vegetation growth, providing fuel. Brick manufacture on the site was a major industry by the 1870s when machine manufacture was introduced.

From 1887, Sydney Park was used as Bedford Brickworks. Bricks made here were widely used around Sydney's suburbs for more than 100 years and the first batch of machine-made bricks was used for the construction of the Farmers' Building on the corner of Market Street, Sydney.

Josiah Gentle opened the Bedford Brickworks in 1893. In 1933 (or 1936), it was taken over by Austral Bricks, who had a large brickworks in Cowper Street, Marrickville. They operated the site until the brickworks closed in 1970.

Other parts of the Alexandria site were used for a variety of industrial purposes including manufacturing, warehousing and gas storage. The brickworks are registered on the City of Sydney local government heritage-list. They have also been used as shelter by unhomed people.

From 1948 the clay pits that had been excavated were used as a municipal waste tip. (Note: This section was based on EDAW 1995) The site was known as the Tempe Tip in the 1960s with systematic dumping. The waste disposal had ceased by 1976, however further 'passive' disposal continued in the central-west of the site.

The Sydney Park Committee, a product of the NSW Government Inner Urban Open Spaces Program had identified St Peters by 1978 as an opportunity for development. The South Sydney Council were interested in development as well as the NSW Heritage Council, who took interest in the brick-making buildings and machinery.

The Department of Environment and Planning commissioned a Plan of Management by Conybeare Morrison and Partners and Ove Arup. The 1982 Master Plan proposed restoration of the kilns and chimneys, a car park and playing field at the north-east corner, pond and landscape works, an 'urban farm' and purchase of the 44ha 'super block' down to Campbell Road.

Landfill gas was examined by the Public Works Department in 1987.

The South Sydney Council took over responsibility of the land in 1990 and the EDAW Plan of Management of 1995 resulted.

After the closure of the tip, the area was reclaimed by placing layers of soil and building rubble over the refuse dump to create the present parkland profile. The land has been declared as contaminated and as of 2025 methane gas mitigation and monitoring systems were being developed.

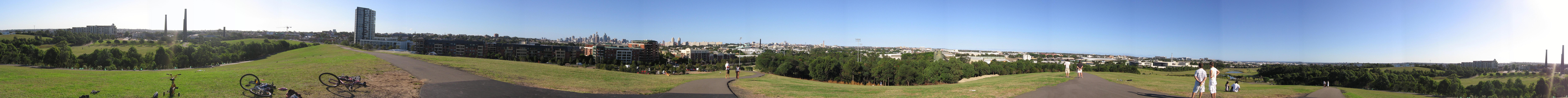
A 360° panorama from one of the hilltops at Sydney Park.

A 2000 report found a lack of primary and secondary sources about the Brickworks.

== Art and heritage ==
Sydney Park features public sculpture including Michael Snape's 'The Trail' 1990 located on top of the hill in the north-western corner of the park, opposite to St Peters Station. This corner, where King Street, Newtown turns into the Princes Highway, features the remaining chimneys and brick kilns from the former brickworks site. These chimneys have been retained as heritage items and are a prominent feature of this area.

== Sports and recreation ==
The Alan Davidson Oval is located in the northern section of the park. The oval is used for cricket and Australian rules football. It is the home ground of the South Sydney District Cricket Club and Newtown Swans Junior Australian rules football team.

The park is also the site of St Peters Parkrun, held every Saturday morning at 8:00 a.m. around the bike trails and paths of the park.

== Culture and events ==
Sydney Park has played an important role in various youth subcultures since its redevelopment – generally without official approval. Throughout the 1990s and to the present day the park is used reasonably regularly for the 'Punks Picnic' – a gathering initially of anarcho-punks from Newtown and neighbouring suburbs. From 2006 to 2008, after organising a number Punks Picnics, Shaun South hosted the Summer Winds DIY music festival at the brick works site, where a plaque now commemorates the events. From 1992 to 1994 the park was also used by the Vibe Tribe for a series of free open-air rave parties that formed an important part of the Sydney electronic music scene throughout the 1990s. The last of these Freequency was violently shut down by over 40 riot police. Since then, in an effort to avoid such "anti-social behaviour" and illegal gatherings, the South Sydney Council (and now City of Sydney Council) has allowed and promoted community arts festivals on the site. In recent years, the park has become home to Sydney's Earthdance event, joining simultaneous dance parties in more than 50 countries to mark the International Day of Peace each September. The park has also become the host for the touring Soundwave Festival having its first show there in 2007 and returning in 2008.

== Flora and fauna ==
The park area has been extensively replanted with a variety of native trees and shrubs. Stormwater retention ponds constructed in the eastern section of the site have been transformed into wetland habitats, partially recreating the original character of the eastern part of the site, and this has attracted a wide variety of bird and animal life including dusky moorhens, Australian magpies and pelicans. It has become a breeding place for black swans.

== Water Re-use Project ==
The Sydney Park Water Re-use Project won both the Civic Trust Award and Special Award for Sustainability at the Civic Trust Awards in the UK in 2018.

== Buildings ==
At the north-west of the park are old brick kilns and chimneys from the 1800s.

To the north-east of the site is a concrete batching plant at 171A Euston Road. In 1982 the site was marked as owned by Monier Ltd. As of 2014 it was occupied by the Metromix batching plant.

=== 205-213 and 215-225 Euston Road ===
To the south-east corner are two large warehouse buildings at 205-213 and 215-225 Euston Road. They were previously occupied by FedEx and Kone elevators. The site was previously used for a gasworks and metal manufacturing.

In the 1982 Sydney Park Plan of Management, the site was marked as being owned by McPherson Ltd (north) an AGL (south). The site was part of Stage 7e of the plan (the second last stage), with a cost of $310,000,.

A 2014 Sydney Park Plan of Management suggested an action to monitor private land at park edges and integrate where appropriate.

In 2015, Hailiang Property Group purchased the 2.1 hectare site from Goodman Group.

In response to a 2017 City of Sydney Design Advisory Panel meeting suggesting a land swap be investigated as part of a DA to grow Sydney Park, the council offices responded that while it would be a superior outcome in terms of broad community benefits, the applicant in question had acquired the site.

By February 2018, HPG had sold about half of the 100 units in the first stage launch of One Sydney Park. Nearly all of the buyers were owner occupiers. By August 2018, designs for a $700 million apartment development, including 390 apartments, were submitted to the City of Sydney. In August 2018, the Australian Financial Review reported that HPG had been requested by their government to divest overseas investments. HPG had been looking for a buyer of the One Sydney Park project off-market.

In 2019, the second stage development application by Hailiang Property Group was complicated by WestConnex construction. Silvester Fuller and MNHDU were selected in a competitive design process. Penny Fuller stated the brief was to hide 400 apartments, as the council really didn't want to see buildings. Development director said HPG was committed to delivering One Sydney Park. In 2019, Brand & Co received award of Best Development Marketing Australia at the International Asia Pacific Awards 2019-2020 for One Sydney Park.

In June 2020, the Central Sydney Planning Committee refused an application on the site. The council said the designs were different to the initial concept and winning design competition plans. There were a significant number of community submissions opposing the development. The Commissioner Peter Walsh said these submissions did not persuade him. After a six-month court battle, and modification, the Land and Environmental Court approved a development of 356 homes. A combination of economic uncertainty in China at the time and the COVID-19 pandemic resulted in construction not commencing.

In March 2026, Besgate sought approval for revised plans with approximately 700 residences, seeking to use the State Significant Development Application process.

On 28 September 2026, Clover Moore wrote a letter to residents about an upcoming State Significant Development application being prepared for 205-213 and 215-225 Euston Road for around 700 new homes. The City of Sydney expressed concern of the height and scale of the plans, potential lack of affordable housing contribution, and short exhibition duration. Moore expressed that livability must be retained, and that we must "avoid overly dense developments that will blight Sydney for generations to come."

=== Council depot ===
As of 2014, directly to the north of 215-225 Euston Road was a former council depot, and was considered a staging area for implementation of a leachate management action and future location of leachate plant, with potential for a new recreational space such as a skateboarding area and childcare.

== Transport ==
Sydney Park is adjacent to St Peters railway station. Nearby bus routes include the 308, 348 and 370. The park has 4 on-site car parks. It is connected to the Mitchell Road and Huntly Street cycleway.

=== Sydney Park Junction ===
The Sydney Park Junction project is a Transport for NSW transport project for improved bike riding and walking links around Sydney park. In March 2022, Transport for NSW received approval for the project, including reallocating traffic lanes on King Street, Princes Highway and Sydney Park Road. An addendum Review of Environmental Factors was released in July 2025.

The project has attracted criticism for scope cuts.

== Gallery ==
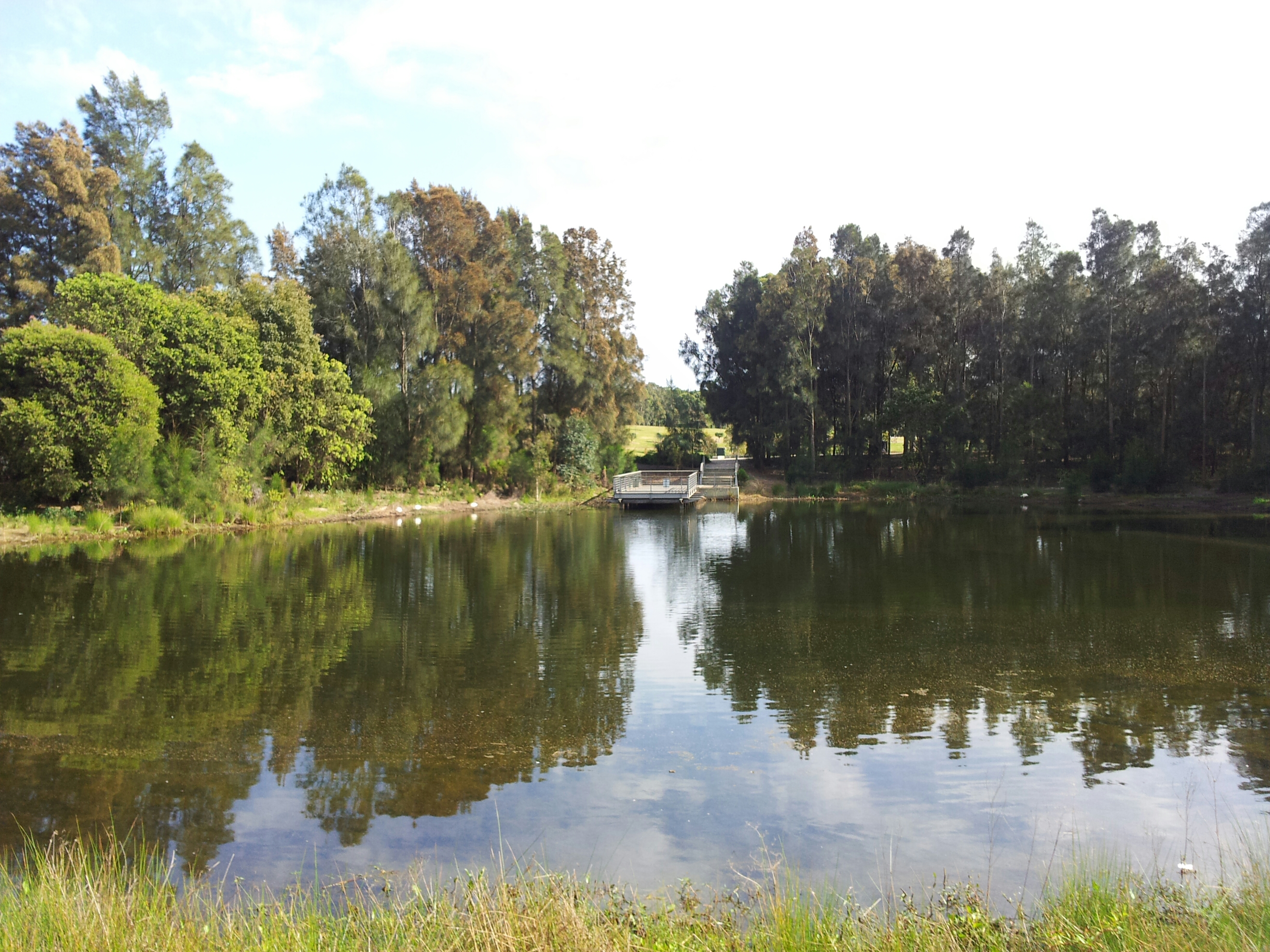
Sydney Park wetlands

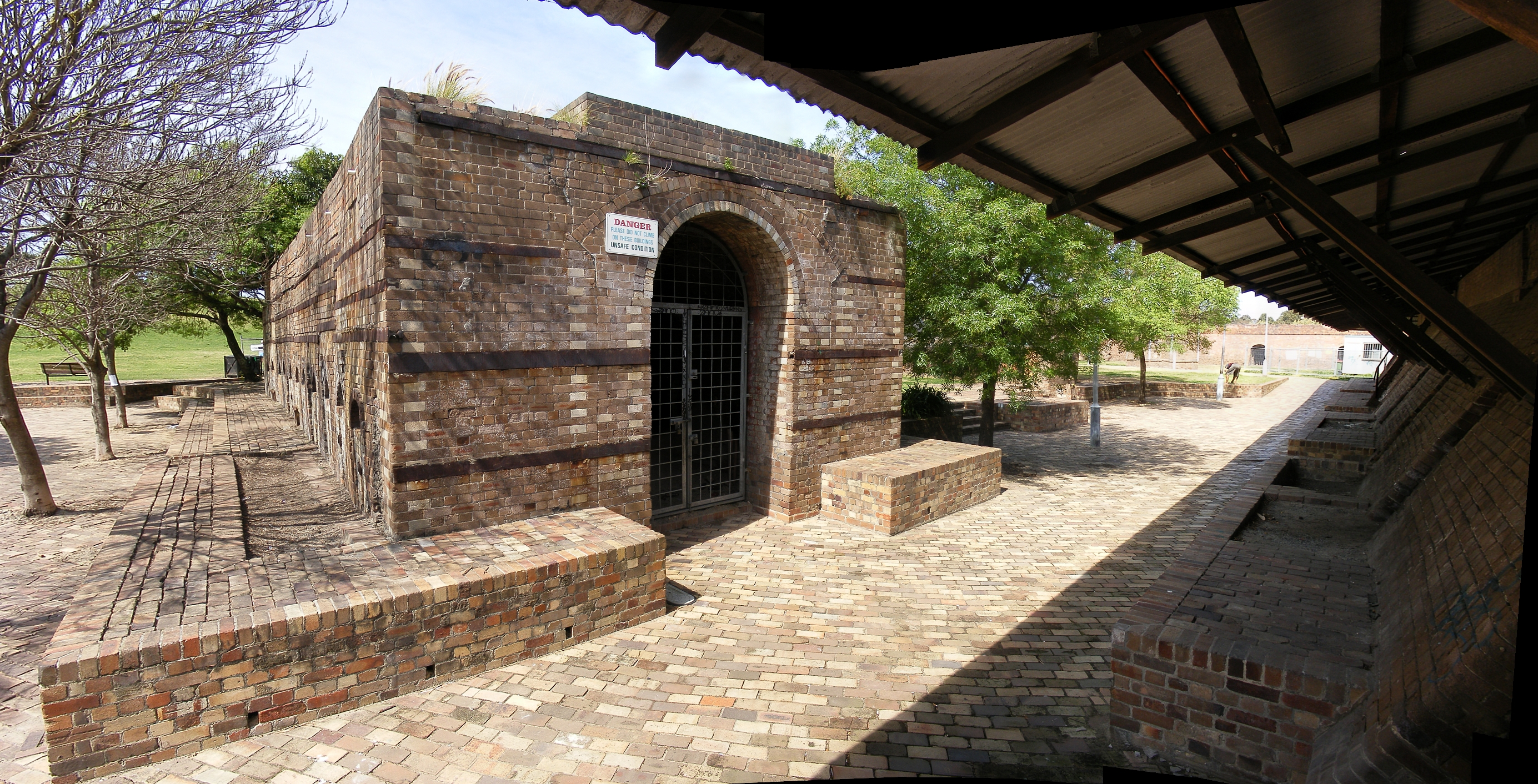
Former brick works in Sydney Park

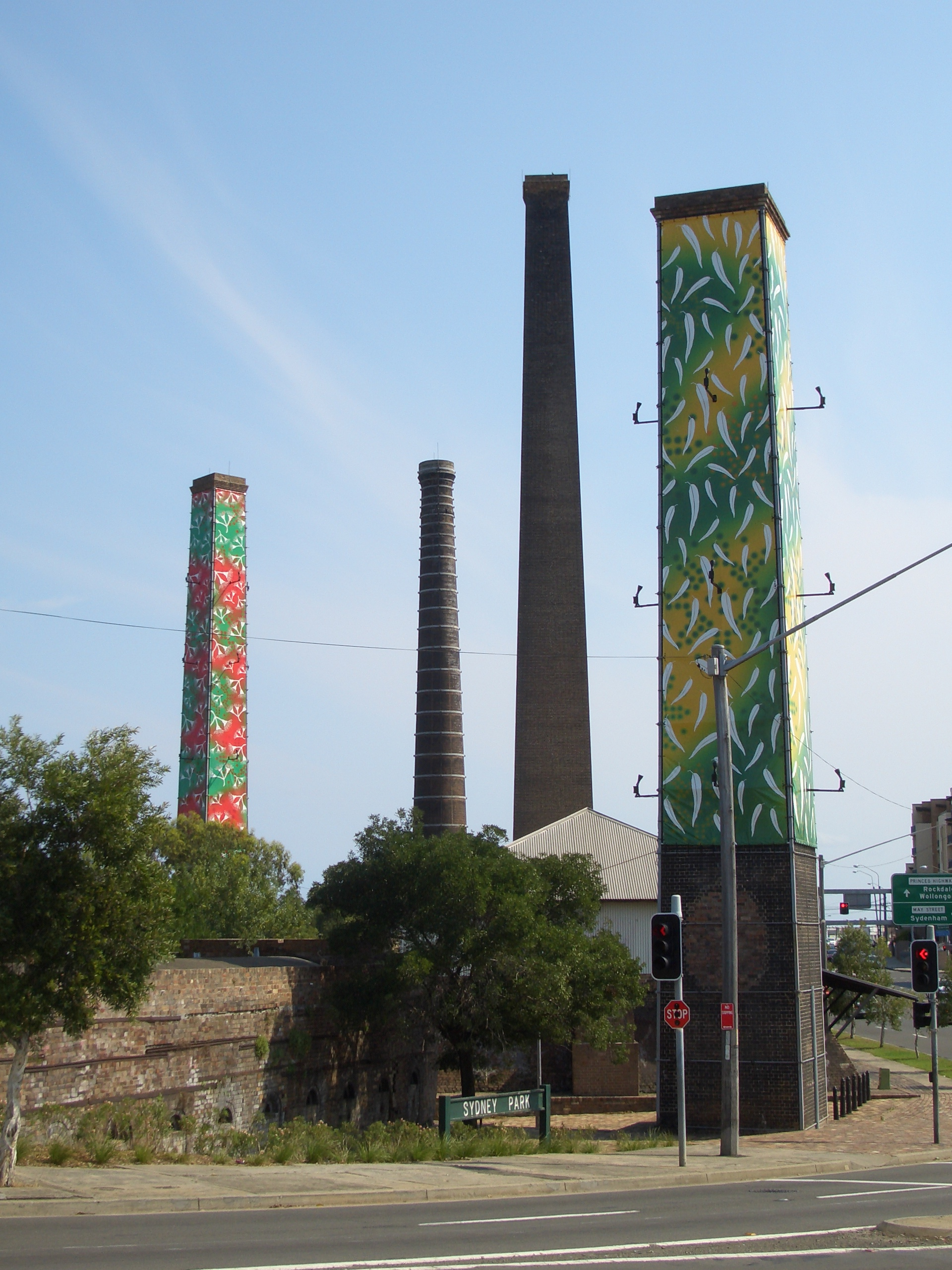
Sydney Park chimneys decorated at Christmas

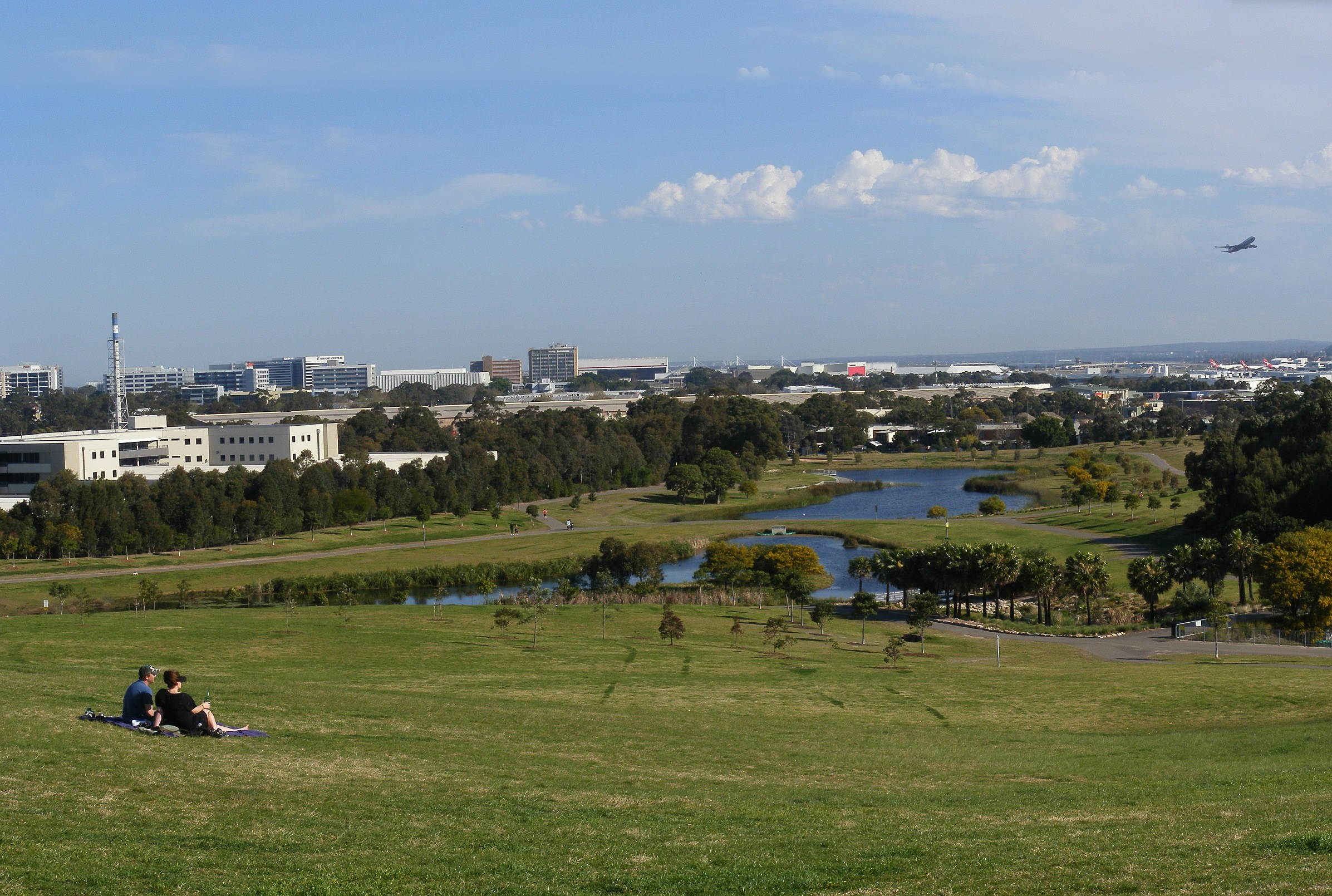
Sydney Park looking south

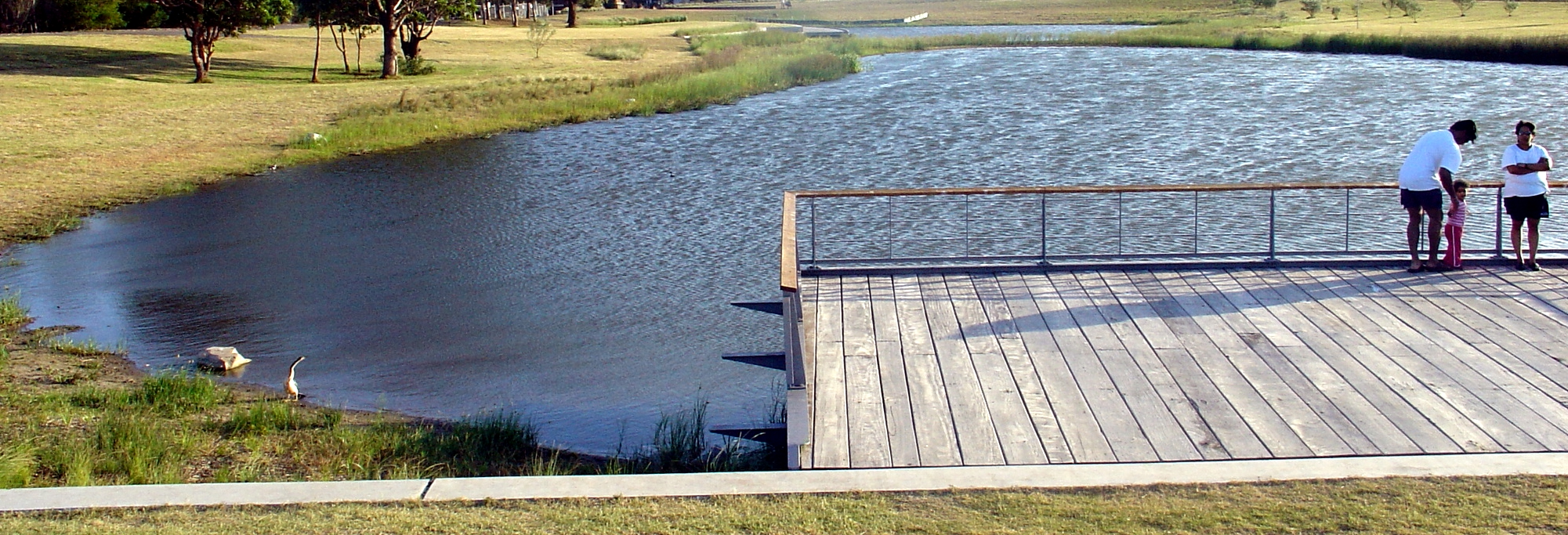
Wetland featuring a boardwalk and viewing platforms

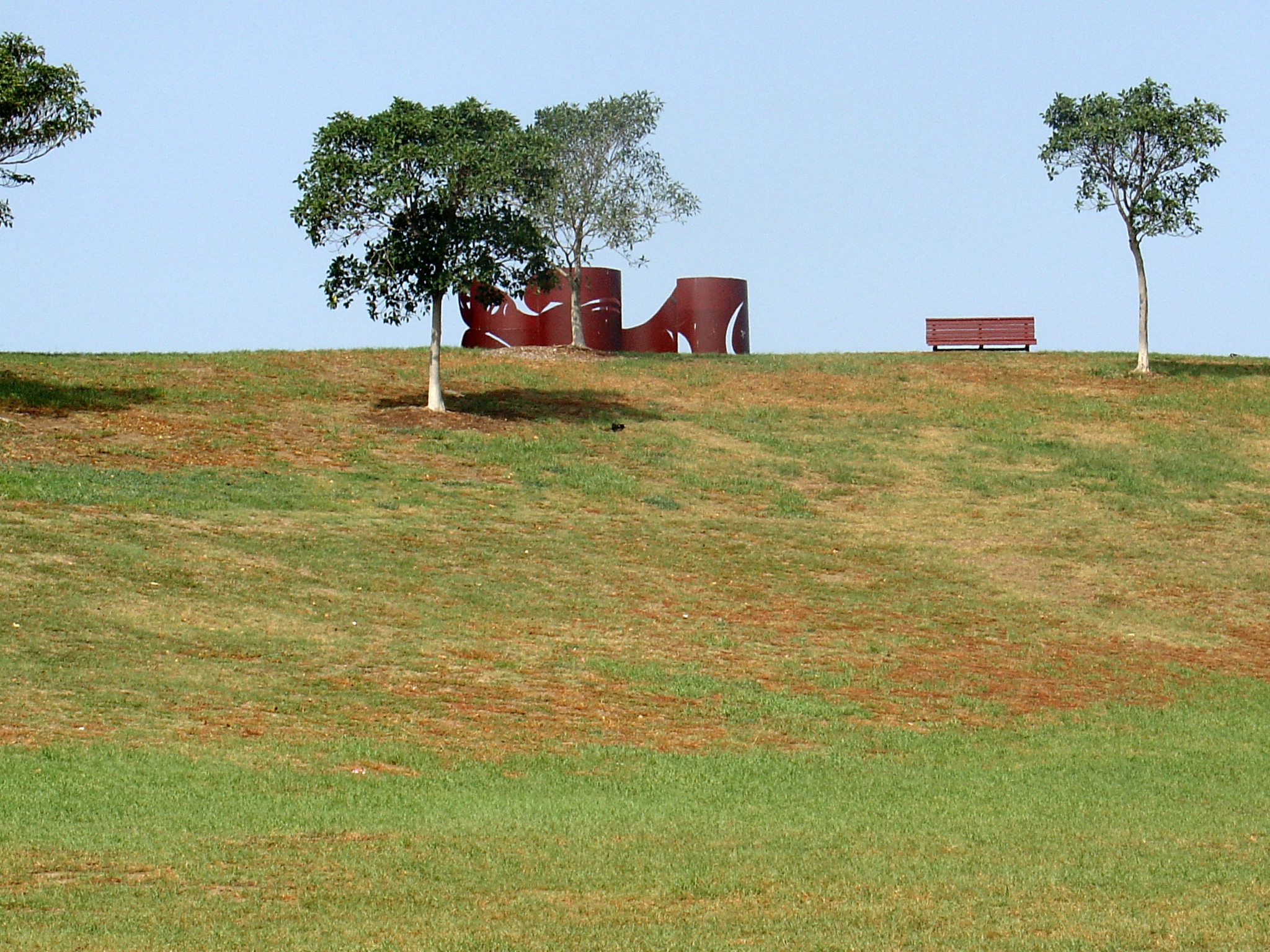
The Trail

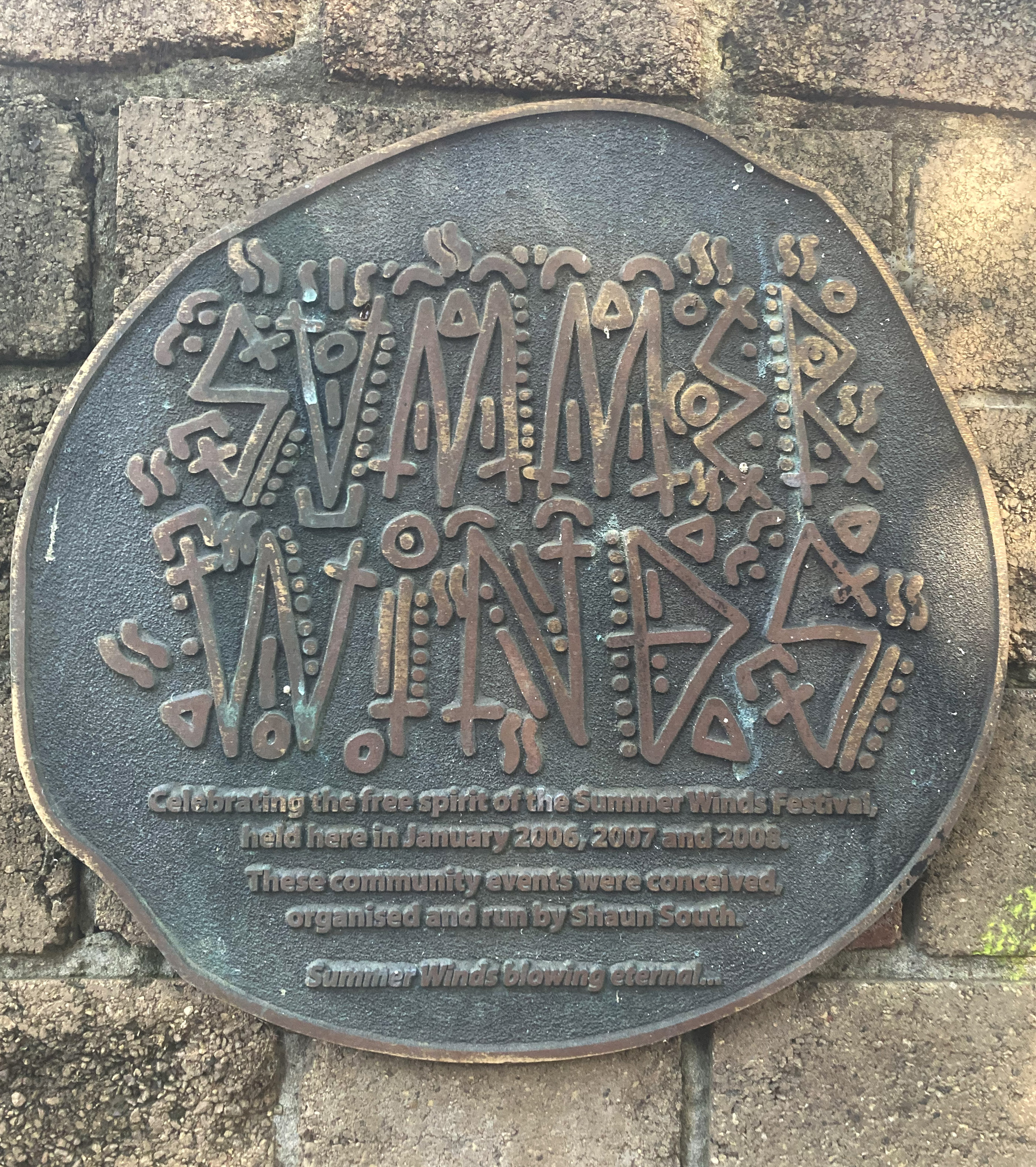
Plaque commemorating the Summer Winds Festival at Sydney Park
