= Cedar Holdings Group =

Chinese holding company

- Company type: Privately held company
- Industry: financial services, asset management, commodities
- Founded: 1997; 29 years ago
- Founders: Zhang Jin
- Headquarters: Guangzhou, China
- Area served: Worldwide
- Key people: Zhang Jing (CEO)
- Revenue: US$33.8 billion (2021)
- Number of employees: 23,856 (2021)
- Website: cedarhd.com

Cedar Holdings Group
- Traditional Chinese: 雪鬆控股集團有限公司
- Simplified Chinese: 雪松控股集团有限公司
- Literal meaning: Cedar Holdings Group Company Limited
Transcriptions
Standard Mandarin
- Hanyu Pinyin: Xuěsōng Kònggǔ jítuán yǒuxiàn gōngsī

The Cedar Holdings Group (Chinese: 雪松控股) is a Chinese holding company active in six business sectors:

- Gongtongyun Supply Chain Group
- Chemical Industry Group
- Cedar Culture & Tourism Group
- King vision Group
- Community Ecological Operation Group
- Financial Services Group

Cedar also controls two A-share listed companies: Qixiang Tengda and Sinoer.

Cedar Holdings was founded in 1997. In 2019 it had assets of 221 billion yuan. Headquartered in Guangzhou, it also has offices in Hong Kong, Singapore, Switzerland, Germany, France and the United States.

In 2020, Cedar bought the British steel firm Stemcor for $150 million.

Cedar was ranked 359th in the Fortune Global 500 for 2021, and on a list of China's top 500 Private Enterprises.

== Controversies ==
In February 2022 Cedar missed interest payments of 20 billion yuan (US$3.15 billion) owed to clients, casting doubt on the soundness of the business; The Nikkei described it as being built on a "shell game," reporting that "Most of the goods traded by Cedar did not belong to Cedar, a person with knowledge of the matter said. The goods in warehouses belonged to state companies that sold them to Cedar and then bought them back after multiple rounds of transactions […] All transactions took place only on paper as the ownership of goods changed hands […] The goods could be sold hundreds of times in days without leaving a warehouse, boosting sales figures for the companies involved."
