= Hengli Group =

Chinese petrochemical and textile company

- Native name: 恒力集团有限公司
- Type: Private
- Industry: Oil refining; Petrochemicals; Polyester materials; Textiles
- Founded: 1994; 32 years ago
- Founders: Chen Jianhua; Fan Hongwei
- Headquarters: Suzhou, China
- Area served: Worldwide
- Key people: Chen Jianhua (chairman)
- Revenue: US$125.085 billion (2026)
- Net income: US$439.7 million (2026)
- Number of employees: 311,600 (2026)
- Website: www.hengli.com

Hengli Group
- Traditional Chinese: 恆力集團有限公司
- Simplified Chinese: 恒力集团有限公司
Transcriptions
Standard Mandarin
- Hanyu Pinyin: Hénglì Jítuán Yǒuxiàn Gōngsī
- IPA: [xə̌ŋ.lî]

Hengli Group (Chinese: 恒力集团) is a Chinese privately held company based in Suzhou, Jiangsu. It operates oil refining, petrochemical, polyester materials and textile businesses. Reuters described the company in 2020 as one of the world's largest polyester yarn producers.

Hengli was founded in 1994 as a small weaving factory by Chen Jianhua and Fan Hongwei. In 2025, Hengli Group ranked 81st on the Fortune Global 500 and 22nd on Fortune China's China 500 list, with Fortune China reporting 2024 revenue of US$121.126 billion.

== History ==
=== Textile origins ===
Hengli traces its origins to the textile industry in Wujiang, Suzhou. In 1994, Chen Jianhua and Fan Hongwei began operating Wujiang Chemical Fiber Weaving Factory, a small weaving business in Shengze, Suzhou, that Xinhua described as having 27 employees at the time. In a 2025 interview published by the All-China Federation of Industry and Commerce, Chen said he had purchased the bankrupt town-run Wujiang Chemical Fiber Weaving Factory for RMB 3.69 million and expanded the business by adding equipment and branch factories. Xinhua reported that Hengli Group was formally established in 2003, with Fan Hongwei serving as general manager.

=== Expansion into polyester and petrochemicals ===
The company expanded from weaving into polyester and then further upstream into petrochemical feedstocks. Hengli Petrochemical's annual report describes an integrated business model in which crude oil and related inputs are processed into products including paraxylene, PTA is produced from paraxylene, and PTA and MEG are then used to produce polyester filaments for textile applications. Hengli has described this upstream-to-downstream model as a chain extending from crude oil, aromatics and ethylene to PTA, ethylene glycol, polyester, yarns, films and textiles.

=== Dalian Changxing Island complex ===
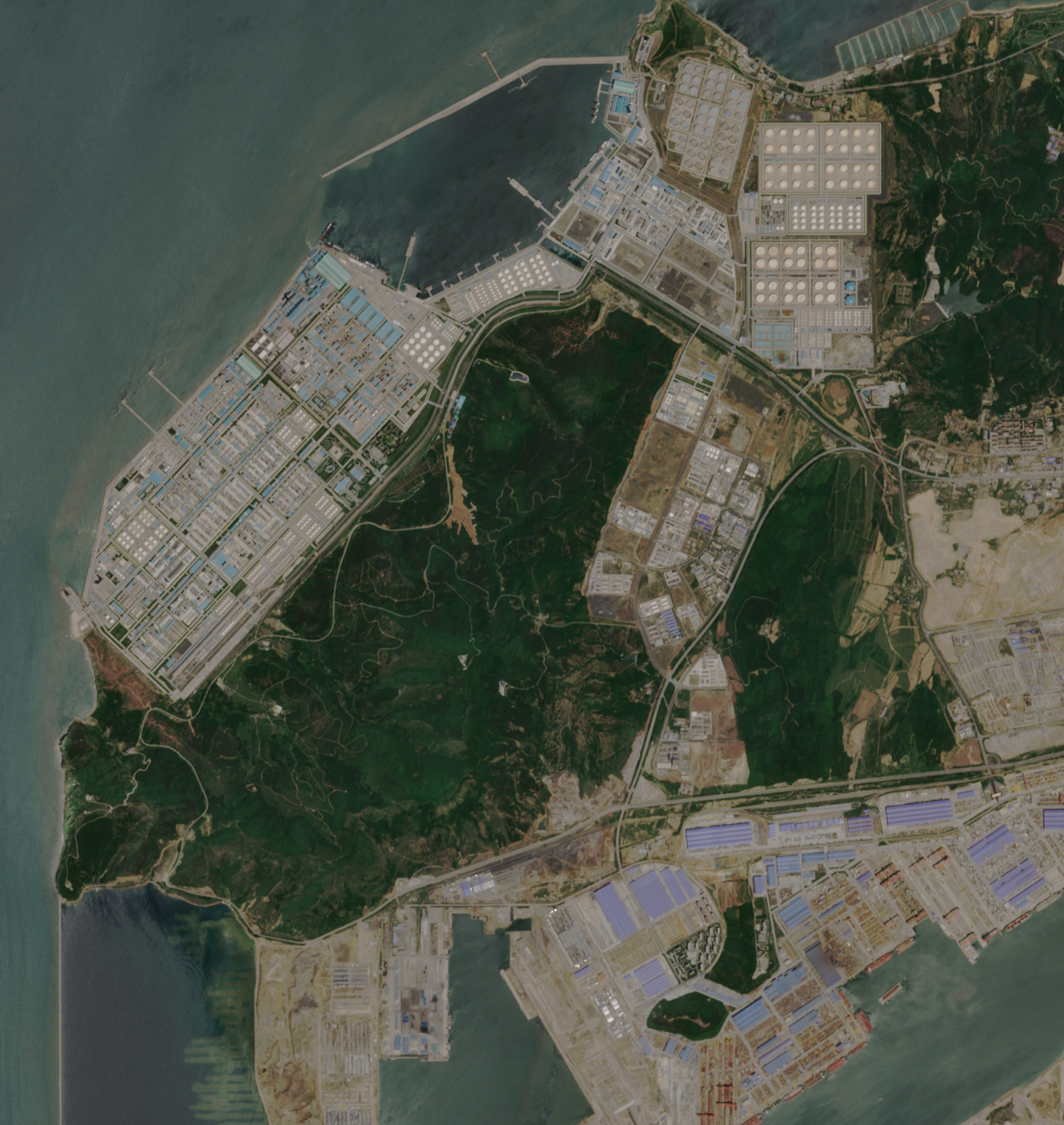
Sentinel-2 satellite image of Hengli Petrochemical Industrial Park on Changxing Island, Dalian, acquired on 30 May 2026.

A major stage in Hengli's expansion was its move into large-scale petrochemicals at Dalian Changxing Island. China Daily reported that Hengli partnered with the Dalian municipal government in 2010 to begin construction of a petrochemical industrial park in the Dalian Changxing Island Economic and Technological Development Zone. Xinhua later described Hengli's Dalian Changxing Island site as including a large PTA production base and a 20-million-tonne-per-year refining and chemical integration project.

Reuters reported in 2018 that Hengli was preparing to begin testing an $11 billion oil refinery and petrochemical complex on reclaimed land at Changxing Island. Reuters said the facility had a crude oil import quota of 20 million tonnes per year, equal to about 400,000 barrels per day, and included ethylene and paraxylene units in addition to refining capacity.

=== Public listing and restructuring ===
Hengli Petrochemical entered the public equity market through a restructuring of Dalian Rubber & Plastics Machinery, an A-share company already listed on the Shanghai Stock Exchange. Hengli Petrochemical's 2024 annual report states that the company was formerly known as Dalian Rubber & Plastics Machinery Co., Ltd., that the predecessor company was listed on the Shanghai Stock Exchange in 2001, and that its name was changed to Hengli Petrochemical Co., Ltd. on 27 May 2016. Reuters also reported in May 2016 that Dalian Rubber & Plastics Machinery would change its name to Hengli Petrochemical.

The listed company's annual report says the China Securities Regulatory Commission approved Dalian Rubber & Plastics Machinery's major asset restructuring in January 2016, including a share transfer to Hengli Group and the acquisition of Jiangsu Hengli Chemical Fiber assets. China Securities Journal later described the transaction as a backdoor listing in which Hengli Petrochemical injected assets worth RMB 10.8 billion into Dalian Rubber & Plastics Machinery at the end of 2015. In 2018, Hengli Petrochemical carried out a further asset restructuring that included the acquisition of Hengli Petrochemical (Dalian) Refining Co., Ltd.

=== Environmental concerns ===
In 2020, Hengli Group's planned coal-to-polyester project drew environmental concern. Reuters reported that the company planned a US$20 billion project in Yulin, Shaanxi, to convert coal into polyester yarn, and that coal-based chemical plants typically emitted around three times more carbon dioxide and wastewater per unit of production than oil-based chemical plants. Ecotextile News described the proposed use of coal as likely to alarm apparel companies with science-based emissions targets.

== Ownership and control ==
Hengli Group is a privately held company founded by Chen Jianhua and Fan Hongwei, who are married. The group's main listed arm is Hengli Petrochemical Co., Ltd., which is chaired by Fan Hongwei; Chen Jianhua chairs the parent Hengli Group.

In Hengli Petrochemical's 2025 annual report, Hengli Group was identified as the listed company's controlling shareholder, with Chen Jianhua named as Hengli Group's legal representative. The report identified Chen Jianhua and Fan Hongwei as Hengli Petrochemical's actual controllers and stated that, through Hengli Group and parties acting in concert, they directly and indirectly held 5,330,873,649 shares, or 75.73%, of Hengli Petrochemical.

== U.S. sanctions ==
On April 24, 2026, the U.S. Department of the Treasury's Office of Foreign Assets Control (OFAC) sanctioned Hengli Petrochemical (Dalian) Refinery Co., Ltd., a subsidiary of Hengli Petrochemical, under Executive Order 13902, which targets persons operating in Iran's petroleum and petrochemical sectors. The Treasury Department said the refinery was one of Iran's largest customers for crude oil and petroleum products and alleged that it had purchased billions of dollars' worth of Iranian petroleum. OFAC also sanctioned about 40 shipping firms and vessels that it said were involved in Iran's oil trade.

Under the sanctions, property and interests in property of designated persons that are in the United States or controlled by U.S. persons are blocked, and U.S. persons are generally prohibited from transactions involving them. OFAC also issued Iran-related General License V, which authorized transactions otherwise prohibited by Executive Order 13902 that were ordinarily incident and necessary to the wind down of transactions involving Hengli Petrochemical (Dalian) Refinery or entities in which it held a 50% or greater interest. The authorization applied through 12:01 a.m. eastern daylight time on May 24, 2026, and OFAC later listed the license as expired. Reuters described the action as a significant escalation of U.S. efforts to curb Iranian oil revenues, noting that Hengli operated a 400,000-barrel-per-day refining complex in Dalian and was the largest Chinese refiner targeted by the United States since it renewed its crackdown on Iranian oil exports in 2019.

Hengli Petrochemical denied trading with Iran, saying in a stock-exchange filing that it had "never engaged in any trade with Iran" and that its crude oil suppliers had guaranteed that the crude oil supplied did not fall within the scope of U.S. sanctions. The company said the sanctions lacked factual and legal basis and that it would seek to have the restrictions lifted. Following the designation, Hengli Petrochemical's shares fell by 10%, while the company said its Dalian refinery and petrochemical facilities were operating normally and that it had sufficient crude inventories for more than three months of processing.

After the sanctions were imposed, Reuters reported that Hengli Group adjusted the ownership structure of its Singapore-based trading arm, Hengli Petrochemical International, reducing Hengli Petrochemical (Dalian) Refinery's ownership from 100% to 5%, with the remaining stake transferred to Dalian Changxing International Trade, a company owned by a local Chinese government entity. In May 2026, China's Ministry of Commerce issued an injunction under China's blocking rules against recognition or compliance with U.S. sanctions on five Chinese refiners, including Hengli Petrochemical (Dalian) Refinery.

Later in May 2026, Reuters reported that Hengli Petrochemical International, the former Singapore trading arm of Hengli Petrochemical (Dalian) Refinery, planned to cease operations and wind down in late May. Reuters, citing industry sources, reported that some staff had been made redundant while others were to be moved to other Hengli group entities that were not under U.S. sanctions. A Reuters follow-up reported further business effects from the sanctions, including the suspension by Wanhua Chemical of a long-term agreement to buy benzene from Hengli Petrochemical and potential risk to a preliminary 2024 agreement under which Saudi Aramco had considered taking a 10% stake in Hengli Petrochemical. Reuters also reported that Hengli's largely domestic focus and Beijing's support could allow it to continue operating largely as usual, while traders said it had redirected petrochemical sales to the domestic market.

== Listed subsidiaries and affiliates ==
Publicly traded subsidiaries and affiliates
Company	Stock code	Market	Direct stake held by Hengli Group	As of	Notes
Hengli Petrochemical Co., Ltd.	600346.SH	Shanghai Stock Exchange	2,100,612,342 shares, or 29.84%	31 March 2026	Hengli Group was listed as acting in concert with Hengneng Investment (Dalian), Fan Hongwei, Dechengli International Group, Jiangsu Hegao Investment, Hailaide International Investment, and the Huayin Xuyang No. 1 private securities investment fund. The 2025 annual report stated that Chen Jianhua and Fan Hongwei, through Hengli Group and parties acting in concert, directly and indirectly held, including voting-right entrusted shares, 5,330,873,649 shares, or 75.73%.
Guangdong Songfa Ceramics Co., Ltd.	603268.SH	Shanghai Stock Exchange	37,428,000 shares, or 3.86%	31 March 2026	Hengli Group was listed as acting in concert with Suzhou Zhongkun Investment, Chen Jianhua, Hengneng Investment (Dalian), and Suzhou Hengneng Supply Chain Management.
Suzhou Wujiang Tongli Lake Tourism Resort Co., Ltd.	834199.OC	National Equities Exchange and Quotations	45,000,000 shares, or 90.00%	31 December 2025	Chen Jianhua held the remaining 5,000,000 shares, or 10.00%; the annual report stated that Chen was also a shareholder and actual controller of Hengli Group.
