= Wuchan Zhongda Group =

Chinese state-owned conglomerate

Wuchan Zhongda Group Co., Ltd.
- Native name: 物产中大集团股份有限公司
- Type: Public company; state owned enterprise
- Traded as: SSE: 600704
- Industry: Conglomerate, supply chain management, industrial manufacturing and financial services
- Predecessor: Zhejiang Materials Bureau; Zhejiang Materials Industry Group; Zhongda Group
- Founded: 1992
- Headquarters: Hangzhou, Zhejiang, China
- Area served: China and overseas markets
- Products: Steel and metal products, wire and cable, tyres, magnesium products, automotive components and industrial materials
- Services: Commodity supply chain services, automobile distribution, logistics, financial leasing, futures, asset management and insurance
- Revenue: CN¥596.46 billion (2025)
- Net income: CN¥3.62 billion (2025)
- Total assets: CN¥200.99 billion (2025)
- Owner: Zhejiang provincial state interests
- Website: www.wzgroup.cn

Wuchan Zhongda Group Co., Ltd. (Chinese: 物产中大集团股份有限公司) is a Chinese state controlled conglomerate headquartered in Hangzhou, Zhejiang. It began being listed on the Fortune Global 500 in 2011.

== See also ==
- List of companies of China
- Economy of Zhejiang
