= Executive Order 13871 =

2019 executive order signed by Donald Trump

Executive Order 13871 is an order signed by Donald Trump on May 8, 2019, also known as the "Iran Metals EO". The order imposed sanctions with respect to the iron, steel, aluminum, and copper sectors of Iran. Although the sale, supply or transfer to and from Iran these commodities were already targeted by Section 1245 of the Iran Freedom and Counter-Proliferation Act of 2012, the Iran Metals executive order expands upon those sanctions and further targets the Iranian iron and copper sectors.

== Stated goal ==
The stated goal of EO 13871 is to "deny Iran all paths to both a nuclear weapon and intercontinental ballistic missiles, and to counter the totality of Iran’s malign influence in the Middle East." In the order it is also stated that United States "aims to deny the Iranian government revenue, including revenue derived from the export of products from Iran’s iron, steel, aluminum, and copper sectors, that may be used to provide funding and support for the proliferation of weapons of mass destruction, terrorist groups and networks, campaigns of regional aggression, and military expansion."

== Extension ==
The order were further extended by President Trump Executive order 13902 on 10 Jan 2020 authorizing further and more rigorous sanctions on the New Sectors, namely Iran's construction, mining, manufacturing, and textile sectors. The stated goal of EO 13902 were to hold "the Iranian regime responsible for attacks against United States personnel and interests by denying it substantial revenue that may be used to fund and support its nuclear program, missile development, terrorism and terrorist proxy networks, and malign regional influence.
