= China Railway No.5 Engineering Group =

- Native name: 中国中铁五局集团有限公司
- Industry: Civil engineering
- Headquarters: Guiyang, China
- Parent: China Railway Group Limited
- Website: www.ztwj.cn

China Railway No.5 Engineering Group Co., Ltd.
- Simplified Chinese: 中国中铁五局集团有限公司
- Traditional Chinese: 中國中鐵五局集團有限公司
Transcriptions

The China Railway No. 5 Group (abbreviated as CR5) is a subsidiary of the transport construction conglomerate, China Railway Group Limited. Domestically it mainly constructs subway lines and high speed rail. The company is also a contractor for a rail line in Singapore. Outside of Asia, the company is a contractor for road projects throughout Africa, where it is active in Benin, Ghana, Uganda, Liberia and Zimbabwe.

It is active in Benin, where it is constructing a road from Godomey to Cotonou, a project funded by the World Bank. The success of the company in Benin and the significantly lower prices it offers than competitors has put in question the future of Colas Group, a French construction company with long standing history in the country.

In Ghana, the company is constructing a new motorway overpass linking Spintex road to East Legon.
