= Privately held company =

Business which is not publicly traded

A privately held company, or simply private company, is a company whose shares and related rights or obligations are not offered for public subscription or publicly negotiated in their respective listed markets. Instead, the company's shares are held and transferred privately and are not traded on public stock exchanges. Related terms include unlisted company and unquoted company.

Private companies are often less well-known than their publicly traded counterparts but still have major importance in the world's economy. For example, in 2008, the 441 largest private companies in the United States accounted for $1.8 trillion in revenues and employed 6.2 million people, according to Forbes.

A private enterprise is any non-government-owned business, whereas a privately held company is a company whose shares are not publicly traded. Therefore, private enterprises encompass both publicly traded and privately held companies, as their ownership is private rather than governmental.

== State, private, and cooperative ownership ==
Private ownership of productive assets differs from state ownership or collective ownership (as in worker-owned companies). This usage is often found in former Eastern Bloc countries to differentiate from former state-owned enterprises, but it may be used anywhere in contrast to a state-owned or a collectively owned company.

In the United States, a privately held company refers to a business entity owned by private stakeholders, investors, or company founders, and its shares are not available for public purchase on stock exchanges. That contrasts with public companies, whose shares are publicly traded, which allows investing by the general public.

== Ownership of stock ==
In countries with public trading markets, a privately held business is generally taken to mean one whose ownership shares or interests are not publicly traded. Often, privately held companies are owned by the company founders or their families and heirs or by a small group of investors. Sometimes, employees also hold shares in private companies. Most small businesses are privately held.

Subsidiaries and joint ventures of publicly traded companies (for example, General Motors' Saturn Corporation), unless shares in the subsidiary itself are traded directly, have characteristics of both privately held companies and publicly traded companies. Such companies are usually subject to the same reporting requirements as privately held companies, but their assets, liabilities, and activities are also including the reports of their parent companies, as are required by the accountancy and securities industry rules relating to groups of companies.

== Form of organization ==
Private companies may be called corporations, limited companies, limited liability companies, unlimited companies, or other names, depending on where and how they are organized and structured. In the United States but not generally in the United Kingdom, the term is also extended to partnerships, sole proprietorships or business trusts. Each of those categories may have additional requirements and restrictions that may impact reporting requirements, income tax liabilities, governmental obligations, employee relations, marketing opportunities, and other business obligations and decisions.

In many countries, there are forms of organization that are restricted to and are commonly used by private companies, for example, the private company limited by shares in the United Kingdom (abbreviated Ltd) or unlimited company and the proprietary limited company (abbreviated Pty Ltd) or unlimited proprietary company (abbreviated Pty) in South Africa and Australia.

In India, private companies are registered by the Registrar of Companies, which is under the Ministry of Corporate Affairs. Indian private companies must contain the word Private Limited at the end of their names.

== Reporting obligations and restrictions ==
Privately held companies generally have fewer or less comprehensive reporting requirements and obligations for transparency, via annual reports, etc. than publicly traded companies do. For example, in the United States, privately held companies are not generally required to publish their financial statements. By not being required to disclose details about their operations and financial outlook, private companies are not forced to disclose information that may potentially be valuable to competitors and so can avoid the immediate erosion of customer and stakeholder confidence in the event of financial duress. Further, with limited reporting requirements and shareholder expectations, private firms are afforded a greater operational flexibility by being able to focus on long-term growth rather than quarterly earnings.

Private companies may also raise capital through private placements, venture capital, or private equity investments without becoming subject to the ongoing disclosure requirements that generally apply to publicly traded companies.

In addition, private company executives may steer their ships without shareholder approval, which allows them to take significant action without delays.

In Australia, Part 2E of the Corporations Act 2001 requires publicly traded companies to file certain documents relating to their annual general meeting with the Australian Securities and Investments Commission (ASIC). There is a similar requirement for large proprietary companies, which are required to lodge Form 388H to the ASIC containing their financial report. In the United States, private companies are held to different accounting auditing standards than public companies, overseen by the Private Company Counsel division of the Financial Accounting Standards Board.^{(see external links)}

Researching private companies and private companies' financials in the United States can involve contacting the secretary of state for the U.S. state of incorporation (or for LLC or partnership, state of formation), or using specialized private company databases such as Dun & Bradstreet. Many other companies provide aggregated data on privately held companies, segmented by industry code. By contrast, in the United Kingdom, all incorporated companies are registered centrally with Companies House.

Privately held companies also sometimes have restrictions on how many shareholders they may have. For example, the U.S. Securities Exchange Act of 1934, section 12(g), limits a privately held company, generally, to fewer than 2000 shareholders, and the U.S. Investment Company Act of 1940, requires registration of investment companies that have more than 100 holders. In Australia, section 113 of the Corporations Act 2001 limits a privately held company to 50 non-employee shareholders.

== Privately owned enterprise ==
A privately owned enterprise is a commercial enterprise owned by private investors, shareholders or owners (usually collectively, but they can be owned by a single individual), and is in contrast to state institutions, such as publicly owned enterprises and government agencies. Private enterprises comprise the private sector of an economy. An economic system that 1) contains a large private sector where privately run businesses are the backbone of the economy, and 2) a business surplus is controlled by the owners, is referred to as capitalism. This contrasts with socialism, where the industry is owned by the state or by all of the community in common. The act of taking assets into the private sector is referred to as privatization.

A privately owned enterprise is one form that private property may take.

=== Types of privately owned businesses ===
- Sole proprietorship: A sole proprietorship is a business owned by one person. The owner may operate on their own or may employ others. The owner of the business has total and unlimited personal liability for the debts incurred by the business. This form is usually relegated to small businesses.
- Partnership: A partnership is a form of business in which two or more people operate for the common goal of making a profit. Each partner has total and unlimited personal liability for the debts incurred by the partnership. There are three typical different types of classifications for partnerships: general partnerships, limited partnerships, and limited liability partnerships.
- Corporation: A business corporation is a for-profit, limited liability or unlimited liability entity that has a separate legal personality from its members. A corporation is owned by one or more shareholders and is overseen by a board of directors, which hires the business's managerial staff. Corporate models have also been applied to the state sector in the form of government-owned corporations. A corporation may be privately held (for example, a close company - see below) or publicly traded.
- Hybrid Types: Some countries, like Germany, the United States, and the United Kingdom have created a hybrid type of entity that has characteristics of both a corporation and a partnership. In Germany, it is called a Gesellschaft mit beschränkter Haftung (GmbH), in the United States it is called a Limited Liability Company (LLC), and in the United Kingdom it is called a Limited Liability Partnership (LLP). It is considered a corporate body similar to a corporation but is typically taxed like a partnership.

=== Close companies ===
In the United Kingdom, a close or closely held company is defined as a company which is controlled by either five or fewer shareholders or is controlled by shareholders who are also directors.

== See also ==
- Limited company
- Private company limited by shares
- Private equity
- Public company
- Unlisted public company
