= Fortune Global 500 =

Annual ranking of corporations

The Fortune Global 500, also known as Global 500, is an annual ranking of the top 500 corporations worldwide as measured by revenue. The list is compiled and published annually by Fortune magazine. It was first published in 1955.

== Methodology ==
Until 1989, Global 500 listed only non–United States industrial corporations under the title "International 500" while the Fortune 500 contained and still contains exclusively United States corporations. In 1990, United States companies were added to compile a truly global list of top industrial corporations as ranked by sales. Since 1995, the list has had its current form, listing also top financial corporations and service providers by revenue.

Several inconsistencies exist in Fortune's ranking of cities with the most Fortune 500 headquarters. On June 3, 2011, the Atlanta Business Chronicle stated examples of Fortune including regional headquarters for some cities, excluding regional headquarters for other cities and in some cases excluding headquarters that are physically located inside a city limit.

== Geographical distribution ==
Since 2001, there has been significant change in the geographical distribution of the companies in the Global 500 rankings. Most of this growth is accounted for by a rapid increase in the number of Chinese Global 500 companies, of which there were 116 by 2026, increasing from only 10 in 2001. The number of European-based companies declined, from 158 to 123, over the same period, as well as Japanese-based companies of which there were about 107 in the ranking in 2000 to now only 40 in 2026.

== Fortune Global 500 list of 2026 ==
The following is the list of Top 10 companies in 2026:

Fortune Global 500 list of 2026
Rank	Company	Country	Industry	Revenue in USD
1	Amazon	United States	Internet services and retailing	▲$716.92 billion
2	Walmart	United States	Retail	▲$713.16 billion
3	State Grid	China	Energy	▲$555.37 billion
4	UnitedHealth Group	United States	Health care	▲$447.57 billion
5	Saudi Aramco	Saudi Arabia	Energy	▼$445.53 billion
6	Apple	United States	Technology	▲$416.16 billion
7	McKesson	United States	Wholesalers: Health Care	▲$403.43 billion
8	Alphabet	United States	Internet services and retailing	▲$402.84 billion
9	CVS Health	United States	Health care	▲$402.07 billion
10	China National Petroleum	China	Petroleum	▼$401.93 billion

=== Breakdown by country/territory ===
These are the Top 10 countries/territories with the highest revenues from the Top 500 companies as of 2026:

Breakdown by country/territory
Rank	Country	Companies
1	United States	141
2	China	116
3	Japan	40
4	Germany	28
5	France	24
6	United Kingdom	21
7	Canada	14
8	South Korea	13
9	Switzerland	12
10	India	10

=== Breakdown by region ===
As of 2026, 47 (9.4%) of the Fortune Global 500 companies are located outside East Asia, North America, and Europe:

Breakdown by region
Region	Companies	Global share
East Asia	175	35%
North America	155	31%
Europe	123	24.6%
Rest of world	47	9.4%

== Fortune Global 500 list of 2025 ==
The following is the list of Top 10 companies in 2025:

Fortune Global 500 list of 2025
Rank	Company	Country	Industry	Revenue in USD
1	Walmart	United States	Retail	▲$681.0 billion
2	Amazon	United States	Internet services and retailing	▲$638.0 billion
3	State Grid	China	Energy	▲$548.4 billion
4	Saudi Aramco	Saudi Arabia	Energy	▼$480.2 billion
5	China National Petroleum	China	Petroleum	▼$412.6 billion
6	Sinopec Group	China	Petroleum	▼$407.5 billion
7	UnitedHealth Group	United States	Health care	▲$400.3 billion
8	Apple	United States	Technology	▲$391.0 billion
9	CVS Health	United States	Health care	▲$372.8 billion
10	Berkshire Hathaway	United States	Financials	▲$371.4 billion

=== Breakdown by country/territory ===
These are the Top 10 countries/territories with the highest revenues from the Top 500 companies as of 2025:

Breakdown by country/territory
Rank	Country	Companies
1	United States	138
2	China	124
3	Japan	38
4	Germany	30
5	France	24
6	United Kingdom	20
7	South Korea	14
8	Canada	13
9	Switzerland	12
10	Netherlands	11

=== Breakdown by region ===
As of 2025, 50 (10%) of the Fortune Global 500 companies are located outside East Asia, North America, and Europe:

Breakdown by region
Region	Companies	Global share
East Asia	182	36.4%
North America	151	30.2%
Europe	117	23.4%
Rest of world	50	10%

== Fortune Global 500 list of 2024 ==
The following is the list of Top 10 companies in 2024:

Fortune Global 500 list of 2024
Rank	Company	Country	Industry	Revenue in USD
1	Walmart	United States	Retail	$648.1 billion
2	Amazon	United States	Internet services and retailing	$574.20 billion
3	State Grid	China	Energy	$545.8 billion
4	Saudi Aramco	Saudi Arabia	Energy	$494.9 billion
5	Sinopec Group	China	Petroleum	$429.7 billion
6	China National Petroleum	China	Petroleum	$421.7 billion
7	Apple	United States	Technology	$383.3 billion
8	UnitedHealth Group	United States	Health care	$371.6 billion
9	Berkshire Hathaway	United States	Financials	$364.5 billion
10	CVS Health	United States	Health care	$357.8 billion

=== Breakdown by country/territory ===
These are the Top 10 countries/territories with the highest revenues from the Top 500 companies as of August 2024:

Breakdown by country/territory
Rank	Country	Companies
1	United States	139
2	China	128
3	Japan	40
4	France	30
5	Germany	29
6	United Kingdom	17
7	South Korea	15
8	Canada	14
9	Switzerland	11
10	Netherlands	11

=== Leadership by sector ===
The following are the top-ranked companies in 2024 for each sector:

Sector	Company	Headquarters	Overall rank	Revenues ($M)
Aerospace & Defense	China North Industries Group	(China) Beijing	#147	82,654
Apparel	Christian Dior	(France) Paris	#119	93,137
Chemicals	Sinochem Holdings	(China) Beijing	#54	143,240
Energy	State Grid Corporation of China	(China) Beijing	#3	545,948
Engineering & Construction	China State Construction Engineering	(China) Beijing	#14	320,431
Financials	Berkshire Hathaway	(United States) Omaha	#9	364,482
Food & Drug Stores	Kroger	(United States) Cincinnati	#51	150,039
Food, Beverages & Tobacco	Nestlé	(Switzerland) Vevey	#98	103,505
Health Care	UnitedHealth Group	(United States) Minnetonka	#8	371,622
Hotels, Restaurants & Leisure	Compass Group	(United Kingdom) Chertsey	#398	38,005
Household Products	Procter & Gamble	(United States) Cincinnati	#149	82,006
Industrials	Hengli Group	(China) Suzhou	#81	114,665
Materials	China Baowu Steel Group	(China) Shanghai	#44	157,216
Media	Walt Disney	(United States) Burbank	#131	88,898
Motor Vehicles & Parts	Volkswagen Group	(Germany) Wolfsburg	#11	348,408
Retailing	Walmart	(United States) Bentonville	#1	648,125
Technology	Apple	(United States) Cupertino	#7	383,285
Telecommunications	China Mobile Communications	(China) Beijing	#55	142,832
Transportation	China Post Group	(China) Beijing	#83	112,779
Wholesalers	Trafigura Group	Singapore	#19	244,280

== Fortune Global 500 list of 2023 ==
The following is the list of Top 10 companies in 2023:

Fortune Global 500 list of 2023
Rank	Company	Country	Industry	Revenue in USD
1	Walmart	United States	Retail	$612.3 billion
2	Saudi Aramco	Saudi Arabia	Energy	$603.7 billion
3	State Grid	China	Energy	$530.0 billion
4	Amazon	United States	Internet services and retailing	$514.0 billion
5	China National Petroleum	China	Petroleum	$483.1 billion
6	Sinopec Group	China	Petroleum	$471.2 billion
7	ExxonMobil	United States	Petroleum	$413.7 billion
8	Apple	United States	Technology	$394.3 billion
9	Shell	United Kingdom	Petroleum	$386.2 billion
10	UnitedHealth Group	United States	Health care	$324.2 billion

=== Breakdown by country/territory ===
These are the Top 10 countries/territories with the highest revenues from the Top 500 companies as of August 2023:

Breakdown by country/territory
Rank	Country	Companies
1	United States	136
2	China	135
3	Japan	41
4	Germany	30
5	France	24
6	South Korea	18
7	United Kingdom	15
8	Canada	14
9	Switzerland	11
10	Netherlands	10

=== Breakdown by region ===
As of August 2023, 28 (6%) of the Fortune Global 500 companies are located outside East Asia, North America, and Europe:

Breakdown by region
Region	Companies	Global share
East Asia	208	42%
North America	153	31%
Europe	118	24%
Rest of world	21	4%

=== Leadership by sector ===
The following are the top-ranked companies in 2023 for each sector:

Sector	Company	Headquarters	Overall rank	Revenues ($M)
Aerospace & Defense	China North Industries Group	(China) Beijing	#146	82,689
Apparel	Christian Dior	(France) Paris	#143	83,283
Chemicals	Sinochem Holdings	(China) Beijing	#38	173,834
Energy	Saudi Aramco	(Saudi Arabia) Dhahran	#2	603,651
Engineering & Construction	China State Construction Engineering	(China) Beijing	#13	305,885
Financials	Berkshire Hathaway	(United States) Omaha	#14	302,089
Food & Drug Stores	Kroger	(United States) Cincinnati	#58	148,258
Food, Beverages & Tobacco	Archer Daniels Midland	(United States) Chicago	#98	101,556
Health Care	UnitedHealth Group	(United States) Minnetonka	#10	324,162
Hotels, Restaurants & Leisure	Compass Group	(United Kingdom) Chertsey	#469	32,564
Household Products	Procter & Gamble	(United States) Cincinnati	#154	80,187
Industrials	Hengli Group	(China) Suzhou	#123	90,944
Materials	China Baowu Steel Group	(China) Shanghai	#44	161,698
Media	Walt Disney	(United States) Burbank	#145	82,722
Motor Vehicles & Parts	Volkswagen Group	(Germany) Wolfsburg	#15	293,685
Retailing	Walmart	(United States) Bentonville	#1	611,289
Technology	Apple	(United States) Cupertino	#8	394,328
Telecommunications	China Mobile Communications	(China) Beijing	#62	139,597
Transportation	China Post Group	(China) Beijing	#86	110,271
Wholesalers	Trafigura Group	Singapore	#12	318,476

== Fortune Global 500 list of 2022 ==
The following is the list of Top 10 companies in 2022:

Fortune Global 500 list of 2022
Rank	Company	Country	Industry	Revenue in USD
1	Walmart	United States	Retail	$572.8 billion
2	Amazon	United States	Internet Services and Retailing	$469.8 billion
3	State Grid	China	Energy	$460.6 billion
4	China National Petroleum	China	Petroleum	$411.7 billion
5	Sinopec Group	China	Petroleum	$401.3 billion
6	Saudi Aramco	Saudi Arabia	Energy	$400.4 billion
7	Apple	United States	Technology	$365.8 billion
8	Volkswagen	Germany	Automobiles	$295.8 billion
9	China State Construction Engineering	China	Construction & Engineering	$293.7 billion
10	CVS Health	United States	Health care	$292.1 billion

=== Breakdown by country ===
These are the Top 10 countries with the highest revenues from the Top 500 companies as of August 2022:

Breakdown by country
Rank	Country	Companies
1	China	145
2	United States	124
3	Japan	47
4	Germany	28
5	France	25
6	United Kingdom	18
7	South Korea	16
8	Switzerland	14
9	Canada	12
10	Netherlands	11

=== Breakdown by region ===
As of August 2022, 26 (5%) of the Fortune Global 500 companies are located outside East Asia, North America, and Europe:

Breakdown by region
Region	Companies	Global share
East Asia	208	42%
North America	138	28%
Europe	128	26%
Rest of world	26	5%

=== Leadership by sector ===
The following are the top-ranked companies in 2022 for each sector:

Sector	Company	Headquarters	Overall rank	Revenues ($M)
Aerospace & Defense	China North Industries Group	(China) Beijing	#136	81,785
Apparel	Christian Dior	(France) Paris	#156	75,924
Business services	Randstad	(Netherlands) Diemen	#491	29,126
Chemicals	Sinochem Holdings	(China) Beijing	#31	172,260
Energy	State Grid	(China) Beijing	#3	460,617
Engineering & Construction	China State Construction Engineering	(China) Beijing	#9	293,712
Financials	Berkshire Hathaway	(United States) Omaha	#14	276,094
Food & Drug Stores	Walgreens Boots Alliance	(United States) Deerfield	#45	148,579
Food, Beverages & Tobacco	Nestlé	(Switzerland) Vevey	#103	95,293
Health Care	CVS Health	(United States) Woonsocket	#10	292,111
Household Products	Procter & Gamble	(United States) Cincinnati	#154	76,118
Industrials	Hengli Group	(China) Suzhou	#75	113,536
Materials	China Baowu Steel Group	(China) Shanghai	#44	150,730
Media	Walt Disney	(United States) Burbank	#183	67,418
Motor Vehicles & Parts	Volkswagen	(Germany) Wolfsburg	#8	295,820
Retailing	Walmart	(United States) Bentonville	#1	572,754
Technology	Apple	(United States) Cupertino	#7	365,817
Telecommunications	AT&T	(United States) Dallas	#32	168,864
Transportation	China Post Group	(China) Beijing	#81	108,669
Wholesalers	Trafigura Group	Singapore	#19	231,308

== Fortune Global 500 list of 2021 ==
The following is the list of Top 10 companies in 2021:

Fortune Global 500 list of 2021
Rank	Company	Country	Industry	Revenue in USD
1	Walmart	United States	Retail	$559.1 billion
2	State Grid	China	Energy	$386.6 billion
3	Amazon	United States	Internet Services and Retailing	$386 billion
4	China National Petroleum	China	Petroleum	$283.9 billion
5	Sinopec Group	China	Petroleum	$283.7 billion
6	Apple	United States	Technology	$274.5 billion
7	CVS Health	United States	Health care	$268.7 billion
8	UnitedHealth Group	United States	Health care	$257.1 billion
9	Toyota Motor	Japan	Automobiles	$256.7 billion
10	Volkswagen	Germany	Automobiles	$253.9 billion

=== Breakdown by country ===
As of August 2021, this is the list of the Top 10 countries with the highest revenues Top 500 companies:

Breakdown by country
Rank	Country	Companies
1	China	135
2	United States	122
3	Japan	53
4	France	28
5	Germany	27
6	United Kingdom	22
7	South Korea	15
8	Switzerland	13
9	Canada	12
10	Netherlands	11

=== Breakdown by region ===
As of August 2021, just 21 (4%) of the Fortune Global 500 companies are located outside East Asia, North America, and Europe:

Breakdown by region
Region	Companies	Global share
East Asia	211	42%
North America	136	27%
Europe	132	26%
Rest of world	21	4%

== Fortune Global 500 list of 2020 ==
The following is the list of Top 10 companies in 2020:

Fortune Global 500 list of 2020
Rank	Company	Country	Industry	Revenue in USD
1	Walmart	United States	Retail	$524 billion
2	Sinopec Group	China	Petroleum	$407 billion
3	State Grid	China	Energy	$384 billion
4	China National Petroleum	China	Petroleum	$379 billion
5	Royal Dutch Shell	Netherlands / United Kingdom	Petroleum	$352 billion
6	Saudi Aramco	Saudi Arabia	Energy	$330 billion
7	Volkswagen	Germany	Automobiles	$283 billion
8	BP	United Kingdom	Petroleum	$283 billion
9	Amazon.com	United States	Internet Services and Retailing	$281 billion
10	Toyota Motor	Japan	Automobiles	$275 billion

=== Breakdown by country ===
As of August 2020, this is the list of the Top 10 countries with the highest earning Top 500 companies:

Breakdown by country
Rank	Country	Companies
1	China	124
2	United States	121
3	Japan	53
4	France	31
5	Germany	27
6	United Kingdom ^{‡}	22
7	South Korea	14
8	Switzerland	14
9	Canada	13
10	Netherlands ^{‡}	13

^{‡} The Global 500 includes Unilever under the heading "Britain/Netherlands", as the company is counted in the tally for both countries.

=== Leadership by sector ===
The following are the top-ranked companies in 2020 for each sector:

Sector	Company	Headquarters	Overall rank	Revenues ($M)
Aerospace & Defense	Airbus	(Netherlands) Leiden	#116	78,883
Apparel	Christian Dior	(France) Paris	#180	60,071
Business services	Compass Group	(United Kingdom) Chertsey	#395	31,736
Chemicals	BASF	(Germany) Ludwigshafen	#143	70,723
Energy	Sinopec Group	(China) Beijing	#2	407,009
Engineering & Construction	China State Construction Engineering	(China) Beijing	#18	205,839
Financials	Berkshire Hathaway	(United States) Omaha	#14	254,616
Food & Drug Stores	Walgreens Boots Alliance	(United States) Deerfield	#41	136,866
Food, Beverages & Tobacco	Nestlé	(Switzerland) Vevey	#82	92,107
Health Care	CVS Health	(United States) Woonsocket	#13	256,776
Household Products	Procter & Gamble	(United States) Cincinnati	#156	67,684
Industrials	Siemens	(Germany) Munich	#74	97,937
Materials	Amer International Group	(China) Shenzhen	#91	88,862
Media	Walt Disney	(United States) Burbank	#150	69,570
Motor Vehicles & Parts	Volkswagen	(Germany) Wolfsburg	#7	282,760
Retailing	Walmart	(United States) Bentonville	#1	523,964
Technology	Apple	(United States) Cupertino	#12	260,174
Telecommunications	AT&T	(United States) Dallas	#22	181,193
Transportation	China Post Group	(China) Beijing	#90	89,347
Wholesalers	Trafigura Group	Singapore	#27	171,474

=== Breakdown by region ===
As of August 2020, just 24 (5%) of the Fortune Global 500 companies are located outside East Asia, North America, and Europe:

Breakdown by region
Region	Companies	Global share
East Asia	200	40%
Europe	138	28%
North America	138	28%
Rest of world	24	5%

== Fortune Global 500 list of 2019 ==
The following is the list of Top 10 companies in 2019:

Fortune Global 500 list of 2019
Rank	Company	Country	Industry	Revenue in USD
1	Walmart	United States	Retail	$514 billion
2	Sinopec Group	China	Petroleum	$415 billion
3	Royal Dutch Shell	Netherlands United Kingdom	Petroleum	$397 billion
4	China National Petroleum	China	Petroleum	$393 billion
5	State Grid	China	Energy	$387 billion
6	Saudi Aramco	Saudi Arabia	Energy	$356 billion
7	BP	United Kingdom	Petroleum	$304 billion
8	Exxon Mobil	United States	Petroleum	$290 billion
9	Volkswagen	Germany	Automobiles	$278 billion
10	Toyota Motor	Japan	Automobiles	$273 billion

=== Breakdown by country ===
As of July 2019, this is the list of the Top 10 countries with the most Global 500 companies:

Breakdown by country
Rank	Country	Companies
1	United States	121
2	China	119
3	Japan	52
4	France	31
5	Germany	29
6	United Kingdom ^{‡}	18
7	South Korea	16
8	Switzerland	14
9	Canada	13
10	Netherlands ^{‡}	12

^{‡} The Global 500 includes Unilever & Royal Dutch Shell under the heading "Britain/Netherlands", as the company is counted in the tally for both countries.

=== Leadership by sector ===
The following are the top-ranked companies in 2019 for each sector:

Sector	Company	Headquarters	Overall rank	Revenues ($M)
Aerospace & Defense	Boeing	(United States) Chicago	#68	101,127
Apparel	Christian Dior	(France) Paris	#187	55,263
Business services	Compass Group	(United Kingdom) Chertsey	#403	30,879
Chemicals	DuPont	(United States) Wilmington	#100	85,977
Energy	Sinopec Group	(China) Beijing	#2	414,650
Engineering & Construction	China State Construction Engineering	(China) Beijing	#21	181,525
Financials	Berkshire Hathaway	(United States) Omaha	#12	247,837
Food & Drug Stores	Walgreens Boots Alliance	(United States) Deerfield	#40	131,537
Food, Beverages & Tobacco	Nestlé	(Switzerland) Vevey	#76	93,513
Health Care	UnitedHealth Group	(United States) Minnetonka	#14	226,247
Household Products	Procter & Gamble	(United States) Cincinnati	#146	66,832
Industrials	General Electric	(United States) Boston	#48	120,268
Materials	China Minmetals	(China) Beijing	#112	80,076
Media	Walt Disney	(United States) Burbank	#170	59,434
Motor Vehicles & Parts	Volkswagen	(Germany) Wolfsburg	#9	278,342
Retailing	Walmart	(United States) Bentonville	#1	514,405
Technology	Apple	(United States) Cupertino	#11	265,595
Telecommunications	AT&T	(United States) Dallas	#25	170,756
Transportation	China Post Group	(China) Beijing	#101	85,628
Wholesalers	Trafigura Group	Singapore	#22	180,744

== Fortune Global 500 list of 2018 ==
The following is the list of Top 10 companies in 2018:

Fortune Global 500 list of 2018
Rank	Company	Country	Industry	Revenue in USD
1	Walmart	United States	Retail	$500 billion
2	State Grid	China	Energy	$349 billion
3	Sinopec Group	China	Petroleum	$327 billion
4	China National Petroleum	China	Petroleum	$326 billion
5	Royal Dutch Shell	Netherlands United Kingdom	Petroleum	$312 billion
6	Toyota Motor	Japan	Automobiles	$265 billion
7	Volkswagen	Germany	Automobiles	$260 billion
8	BP	United Kingdom	Petroleum	$245 billion
9	Exxon Mobil	United States	Petroleum	$244 billion
10	Berkshire Hathaway	United States	Holding	$242 billion

=== Breakdown by country ===
As of July 2018, this is the list of the Top 10 countries with the most Global 500 companies:

Breakdown by country
Rank	Country	Companies
1	United States	126
2	China	120
3	Japan	52
4	Germany	32
5	France	28
6	United Kingdom ^{†}	21
7	South Korea	16
8	Netherlands ^{†}	15
9	Switzerland	14
10	Canada	12

^{†} The Global 500 includes Unilever under the heading "Britain/Netherlands", as the company is counted in the tally for both countries.

As shown in the table above, 436 (87.2%) of the Global 500 are represented by only 10 countries: two in North America (Canada and United States), five in Western Europe (France, Germany, Netherlands, Switzerland and the United Kingdom) and three in East Asia (China, Japan and South Korea). Moreover, the top six (United States, China, Japan, Germany, France and the United Kingdom) are the world's largest economies as estimated by the IMF (List of countries by GDP (nominal)). Among the Global 500, 379 companies (75.8%) are from these six countries.

=== Leadership by sector ===
The following are the top-ranked companies in 2018 for each sector:

Sector	Company	Headquarters	Overall rank	Revenues ($M)
Aerospace & Defense	Boeing	(United States) Chicago	#64	93,392
Apparel	Christian Dior	(France) Paris	#208	49,221
Business services	Compass Group	(United Kingdom) Chertsey	#413	28,578
Chemicals	BASF	(Germany) Ludwigshafen	#112	72,677
Energy	State Grid	(China) Beijing	#2	348,903
Engineering & Construction	China State Construction Engineering	(China) Beijing	#23	156,071
Financials	Berkshire Hathaway	(United States) Omaha	#10	242,137
Food & Drug Stores	Kroger	(United States) Cincinnati	#39	122,662
Food, Beverages & Tobacco	Nestlé	(Switzerland) Vevey	#69	91,222
Health Care	UnitedHealth Group	(United States) Minnetonka	#15	201,159
Household Products	Procter & Gamble	(United States) Cincinnati	#135	66,217
Industrials	General Electric	(United States) Boston	#41	122,274
Materials	China Minmetals	(China) Beijing	#109	72,997
Media	Disney	(United States) Burbank	#176	55,137
Motor Vehicles & Parts	Toyota Motor	(Japan) Toyota	#6	265,172
Retailing	Walmart	(United States) Bentonville	#1	500,343
Technology	Apple	(United States) Cupertino	#11	229,234
Telecommunications	AT&T	(United States) Dallas	#20	160,546
Transportation	China Post Group	(China) Beijing	#113	72,197
Wholesalers	McKesson Corporation	(United States) San Francisco	#13	208,357

=== Breakdown by industry ===
The following are the top-ranked companies in 2018 for each industry:

Fortune Global 500 by industry
Industry	Company	Country	Rank	Revenue ($M)
Aerospace & Defense	Boeing	United States	64	93,392
Airlines	American Airlines	United States	260	42,207
Apparel	Christian Dior	France	208	49,221
Banks: Commercial & Savings	Industrial & Commercial Bank	China	26	153,021
Beverages	Anheuser-Busch InBev	Belgium	170	56,444
Building Materials, Glass	Saint-Gobain	France	231	46,002
Chemicals	BASF	Germany	112	72,677
Computer Software	Microsoft	United States	71	89,950
Computers, Office Equipment	Apple	United States	11	229,234
Construction & Farm Machinery	Caterpillar	United States	238	45,462
Diversified Financials	EXOR Group	Netherlands	19	161,677
Electronics, Electrical Equipment	Samsung Electronics	South Korea	12	211,940
Energy	Gazprom	Russia	49	111,983
Engineering & Construction	China Construction Engineering	China	23	156,071
Entertainment	Disney	United States	176	55,137
Food & Drug Stores	Kroger	United States	39	122,662
Food Consumer Products	Nestle	Switzerland	69	91,222
Food Production	Archer Daniels Midland	United States	152	60,828
Food Services	Compass Group	United Kingdom	413	28,578
General Merchandisers	Walmart	United States	1	500,343
Health Care: Insurance & Managed Care	UnitedHealth Group	United States	15	201,159
Health Care: Medical Facilities	HCA Healthcare	United States	215	47,653
Health Care: Pharmacy & Other Services	CVS Health	United States	17	184,765
Household & Personal Products	Procter & Gamble	United States	135	66,217
Human Resources & Employment Services	Adecco Group	Switzerland	441	26,670
Industrial Machinery	General Electric	United States	41	122,274
Information Technology Services	IBM	United States	92	79,139
Insurance: Life, Health (Mutual)	Nippon Life Insurance	Japan	126	68,684
Insurance: Life, Health (Stock)	AXA	France	27	149,461
Insurance: Property & Casualty (Mutual)	State Farm Insurance	United States	95	78,331
Insurance: Property & Casualty (Stock)	Berkshire Hathaway	United States	10	242,137
Internet Services & Retailing	Amazon.com	United States	18	177,866
Mail, Package, & Freight Delivery	China Post Group	China	113	72,197
Medical Products & Equipment	Medtronic	(Republic of Ireland) Ireland	396	29,710
Metals	China Minmetals	China	109	72,997
Mining, Crude-Oil Production	Glencore	Switzerland	14	205,476
Motor Vehicles & Parts	Toyota Motor	Japan	6	265,172
Network & Other Communications Equipment	Huawei Investment & Holding	China	72	89,311
Oil & Gas Equipment, Services	Schlumberger	United States	386	30,440
Petroleum Refining	Sinopec Group	China	3	326,953
Pharmaceuticals	China Resources	China	86	82,184
Pipelines	Energy Transfer Equity	United States	217	47,487
Railroads	Deutsche Bahn	Germany	211	48,124
Real Estate	China Evergrande Group	China	230	46,019
Semiconductors & Other Electronic Components	Intel	United States	146	62,761
Shipping	China Shipbuilding Industry	China	245	44,431
Specialty Retailers	Home Depot	United States	57	100,904
Telecommunications	AT&T	United States	20	160,546
Textiles	Shandong Weiqiao Pioneering	China	185	53,203
Tobacco	Philip Morris International	United States	411	28,748
Trading	Trafigura Group	Singapore	32	136,421
Utilities	State Grid	China	2	348,903
Wholesalers: Electronics & Office Equipment	Tech Data	United States	315	36,775
Wholesalers: Food & Grocery	Sysco	United States	174	55,371
Wholesalers: Health Care	McKesson Corporation	United States	13	208,357

Most profitable

The following is the Global 500 list sorted by profits:

Fortune Global 500 most profitable of 2018
Rank	Company	Country	Profits ($M)
1	Apple	United States	$48,351.0
2	British American Tobacco	United Kingdom	$48,327.8
3	Berkshire Hathaway	United States	$44,940.0
4	Industrial & Commercial Bank of China	China	$42,323.7
5	Samsung Electronics	South Korea	$36,575.4
6	China Construction Bank	China	$35,845.2
7	Verizon	United States	$30,101.0
8	AT&T	United States	$29,450.0
9	Agricultural Bank of China	China	$28,550.4
10	Bank of China	China	$25,509.2

== Fortune Global 500 list of 2017 ==
The following is the list of Top 10 companies in 2017:

Rank	Company	Country	Industry	Revenue in USD
1	Walmart	United States	Retail	$486 billion
2	State Grid	China	Energy	$316 billion
3	Sinopec Group	China	Petroleum	$268 billion
4	China National Petroleum	China	Petroleum	$263 billion
5	Toyota Motor	Japan	Automobiles	$255 billion
6	Volkswagen	Germany	Automobiles	$240 billion
7	Royal Dutch Shell	Netherlands ^{†}	Petroleum	$240 billion
8	Berkshire Hathaway	United States	Products	$242 billion
9	Apple	United States	Technology	$216 billion
10	Exxon Mobil	United States	Petroleum	$205 billion

^{†} Fortune had previously listed Shell as a British/Dutch company, but as of the 2016 listing it is listed as Dutch.

=== Breakdown by country ===
As of November 2017, this is the list of the Top 10 countries with the most Global 500 companies:

Rank	Country	Companies
1	United States	133
2	China	109
3	Japan	51
4	France	29
5	Germany	29
6	United Kingdom ^{†}	21
7	South Korea	15
8	Netherlands ^{†}	15
9	Switzerland	13

^{†} The Global 500 includes Unilever under the heading "Britain/Netherlands", as the company is counted in the tally for both countries.

As can be seen from the table above, 425 (85.0%) of the Global 500 are represented by only 10 countries: two in North America (Canada and United States), five in Western Europe (France, Germany, Netherlands, Switzerland, and the United Kingdom) and three in East Asia (China, Japan and South Korea). Moreover, the top six (United States, China, Japan, France, Germany, and the United Kingdom) are some of the world's largest economies as estimated by the IMF (List of countries by GDP (nominal)). Among the Fortune Global 500, 371 companies (74.2%) are from these six countries.

=== Leadership by sector ===
The top-ranked companies in each sector are as follows:

Sector	Company	Headquarters	Overall rank	Revenues ($M)
Aerospace & Defense	Boeing	(United States) Chicago	#60	94,571
Apparel	Christian Dior	(France) Paris	#234	42,113
Business services	The Adecco Group	(Switzerland) Zürich	#434	25,112
Chemicals	BASF	(Germany) Ludwigshafen	#126	63,641
Energy	State Grid Corporation of China	(China) Beijing	#2	315,199
Engineering & Construction	China State Construction Engineering	(China) Beijing	#24	144,505
Financials	Berkshire Hathaway	(United States) Omaha	#8	223,604
Food & Drug Stores	Walgreens Boots Alliance	(United States) Deerfield	#37	117,351
Food, Beverages & Tobacco	Nestlé	(Switzerland) Vevey	#64	90,814
Health Care	UnitedHealth Group	(United States) Minnetonka	#13	184,840
Household Products	Procter & Gamble	(United States) Cincinnati	#98	71,726
Industrials	General Electric	(United States) Boston	#31	126,661
Materials	China Minmetals	(China) Beijing	#120	65,547
Media	The Walt Disney Company	(United States) Burbank	#161	55,632
Motor Vehicles & Parts	Toyota Motor	(Japan) Toyota	#5	255,000
Retailing	Walmart	(United States) Bentonville	#1	485,873
Technology	Apple	(United States) Cupertino	#9	215,639
Telecommunications	AT&T	(United States) Dallas	#19	163,786
Transportation	U.S. Postal Service	(United States) Washington, D.C.	#99	71,498
Wholesalers	McKesson Corporation	(United States) Irving, Texas	#11	198,533

== See also ==
- 40 Under 40
- Fortune India 500
- Forbes Global 2000
- Fortune 500
- Fortune 1000
- List of largest companies by revenue
- List of largest employers
- List of public corporations by market capitalization
- Most Valuable Nation Brands List
