= List of largest Swedish companies =

This article lists the largest companies in Sweden in terms of their revenue, net profit and total assets, according to the American business magazines Fortune and Forbes.

== 2023 Fortune list ==
This list displays all Swedish companies in the Fortune Global 500, which ranks the world's largest companies by annual revenue. The figures below are given in billions of US dollars and are for the fiscal year 2022. Also listed are the headquarters location, net profit, number of employees worldwide and industry sector of each company.

Rank	Fortune 500 rank	Name	Industry	Revenue (USD millions)	Profits (USD millions)	Employees	Headquarters
1	307	Volvo	Automotive	46,828	3,236	94,921	Gothenburg

== 2019 Forbes list ==
This list is based on the Forbes Global 2000, which ranks the world's 2,000 largest publicly traded companies. The Forbes list takes into account a multitude of factors, including the revenue, net profit, total assets and market value of each company; each factor is given a weighted rank in terms of importance when considering the overall ranking. The table below also lists the headquarters location and industry sector of each company. The figures are in billions of US dollars and are for the year 2018. All 26 companies from Sweden are listed.

Rank	Forbes 2000 rank	Name	Headquarters	Revenue (billions US$)	Profit (billions US$)	Assets (billions US$)	Value (billions US$)	Industry
1	231	Nordea	Helsinki and Stockholm	15.0	3.6	630.6	33.9	Banking
2	246	Volvo	Gothenburg	44.9	2.9	53.5	32.8	Automotive
3	416	SEB Group	Stockholm	8.0	2.7	289.6	21.2	Banking
4	450	Svenska Handelsbanken	Stockholm	7.4	2.0	341.8	21.8	Banking
5	497	Swedbank	Stockholm	6.6	2.4	253.3	18.6	Banking
6	595	H&M	Stockholm	24.3	1.4	13.2	29.7	Retail
7	656	Telia Company	Solna	9.6	1.2	28.0	18.7	Telecommunication
8	700	Atlas Copco	Nacka	11.0	2.2	10.9	36.8	Industrials
9	719	Ericsson	Stockholm	24.1	−0.3	30.3	33.4	Telecommunication
10	724	Essity	Stockholm	13.6	0.9	17.4	20.0	Consumer goods
11	725	Sandvik	Stockholm	11.5	1.5	13.3	23.7	Industrials
12	1036	Investor AB	Stockholm	4.7	−0.3	47.0	36.1	Finance
13	1150	Skanska	Stockholm	19.7	0.5	13.1	7.7	Construction
14	1219	Assa Abloy	Stockholm	9.7	0.3	12.0	25.1	Industrials
15	1224	SKF	Gothenburg	9.9	0.8	9.8	8.7	Industrials
16	1250	Hexagon	Stockholm	4.4	0.9	11.1	20.3	Industrials
17	1455	Electrolux	Stockholm	14.3	0.4	11.0	7.4	Home appliance
18	1478	Boliden AB	Stockholm	6.0	0.8	6.6	8.4	Mining
19	1519	ICA Gruppen	Solna	13.3	0.4	9.1	7.4	Retail
20	1531	Epiroc	Nacka	4.4	0.6	4.1	13.2	Industrials
21	1622	Fastighets Balder	Gothenburg	0.6	1.1	14.4	5.8	Finance
22	1684	Industrivarden	Stockholm	0.6	0.6	11.4	10.1	Finance
23	1825	Alfa Laval	Lund	4.7	0.5	6.6	10.4	Industrials
24	1909	Autoliv	Stockholm	9.3	0.2	6.7	7.6	Automotive
25	1967	L E Lundbergföretagen	Stockholm	2.5	0.4	15.3	8.2	Finance
26	1978	Securitas AB	Stockholm	11.7	0.3	6.3	6.3	Services

== See also ==
- List of companies of Sweden
- List of largest companies by revenue
