= Unifly =

European software company

Unifly is a European software company that provides a platform for drone telematics services for unmanned traffic management. The company provides mapping and location data to connect authorities with pilots for the safe integration of drones into the airspace and unmanned aviation. The company was a wholly owned subsidiary of VITO until a corporate spin-off in 2015. Unifly is headquartered in Antwerp, Belgium.

== History ==
Unifly was founded in 2015 by aerospace experts Andres Van Swalm, Jürgen Verstaen and Koen Meuleman in Paters Vaetje. They worked on creating a platform to facilitate unmanned traffic management solutions in the aerospace for drones. The company received $1.2 million in seed funding from PMV and Qbic Fund. Again in 2016, it raised another round of series A funding of $5 million from Terra Drone for the business expansion and development.

In May 2018, Unifly announced that it has partnered with UNICEF to create a UTM drone corridor in Africa. Later in the year the company announced its partnership with the Northeast UAS Airspace Integration Research Alliance (NUAIR) program for New York's UAS Test Site to test drone mission for the proposed corridor. As of 2018, the company has operations in Spain, France, Belgium, Denmark, Germany, the US, Malawi, China and Japan.

== Partnerships ==
Unifly partnered with HERE Technologies that specialises in digital mapping and location services to enable airspace maps for drones. In 2018, Unifly signed a memorandum of understanding (MoU) with China's Huawei Technologies to cooperate in the field of unmanned traffic management (UTM) systems. In August 2018, Unifly formed a partnership with Integra Aviation Academy, NUAIR and Griffiss International Airport to visualize and manage drone traffic in the low-altitude airspace.

== Projects ==
The company works on European projects for Horizon 2020 including, CORUS, CLASS, SECOPS and PODIUM.

== Awards ==
- 2018: Infosecurity Tech Startup of the Year
- 2017: Luciad Geospatial Excellence Awards: Best Aviation Application.
- 2017: Tech Startup Day: Scale-up of the Year.
- 2017: EU Drone Awards: Best Emerging Drone Company.
- 2016: Nacht van de KMO / Night of the SME: Most Promising Company
