= List of largest Nordic companies =

This is a list of the largest companies from the Nordic countries, as determined by different factors. There are several ways of ranking companies, be it by revenue, income, market value or number of employees. Arguably, the most complete list, is the annual Forbes Global 2000 list, a ranking based on four metrics. Of note, IKEA Group, with $37.6 billion in annual revenue and $4.8 billion in annual profit, is not included on the Forbes Global 2000 list.

== Largest Nordic companies according to Forbes ==
The Forbes Global 2000 published on 18 April 2012 is a ranking of largest companies in the world, by a mix of four metrics: sales, profits, assets and market value. The ranking number shows the ranking among all other Nordic companies on the list, while the number displayed within parenthesis shows the actual ranking among all the companies on the Forbes Global 2000 list.

The ranking is based on annual reports, as of April 2012. As a consequence, the data is most likely based on 2011 annual reports and market values are most likely those of April 2012 (unless otherwise noted). Furthermore, the ranking does not take privately or state-owned enterprises into account.

Rank	Company	Headquarters	Industry	Revenue (billion $)	Profits (billion $)	Assets (billion $)	Market value (billion $)
01 (41)	Equinor	Stavanger, Norway	Oil and gas	111.6	13.1	127.8	81.4
02 (135)	Nordea	Helsinki, Finland	Banking	21.7	3.4	933.8	39.7
03 (152)	Maersk	Copenhagen, Denmark	Transportation	56.1	2.6	69.8	33.7
04 (183)	Volvo	Gothenburg, Sweden	Automotive	45.0	2.6	49.7	30.2
05 (239)	Ericsson	Stockholm, Sweden	Telecommunication	32.9	1.8	19.0	19.4
06 (260)	DNB	Oslo, Norway	Diversified financial	11.6	2.2	356.1	21.1
07 (280)	SEB	Stockholm, Sweden	Banking	13.5	1.6	344.5	19.2
08 (282)	Handelsbanken	Stockholm, Sweden	Banking	10.9	1.8	358.0	23.2
09 (294)	Telia	Stockholm, Sweden	Telecommunications	15.1	2.7	35.9	30.0
10 (311)	Swedbank	Stockholm, Sweden	Banking	10.3	1.7	270.8	19.1
11 (353)	Telenor	Fornebu, Norway	Telecommunication	16.4	1.3	27.8	33.9
12 (432)	Fortum	Espoo, Finland	Utilities	3.9	0.9	29.7	16.8
13 (466)	Novo	Copenhagen, Denmark	Health care	11.6	3.0	10.9	90.3
14 (489)	H&M	Stockholm, Sweden	Retailing	16.3	2.3	8.7	61.6
15 (498)	Danske Bank	Copenhagen, Denmark	Banking	20.0	0.3	597.8	15.8
16 (503)	Sampo Group	Helsinki, Finland	Insurance	7.2	1.3	38.3	16.3
17 (504)	Norsk Hydro	Oslo, Norway	Industrial	16.3	1.1	22.2	11.7
18 (528)	Atlas Copco	Stockholm, Sweden	Capital goods	13.6	0.8	14.4	19.0
19 (563)	Carlsberg Group	Copenhagen, Denmark	Brewery	11.1	0.9	25.6	12.8
20 (573)	Nokia	Espoo, Finland	Technology	50.1	-1.5	44.6	32.8
21 (574)	Yara International	Oslo, Norway	Chemical industry	13.0	2.0	12.1	13.3
22 (578)	Sandvik	Sandviken, Sweden	Capital goods	13.6	0.8	14.4	19.0
23 (707)	Skanska	Stockholm, Sweden	Construction	17.2	1.1	11.8	7.5
24 (765)	UPM-Kymmene	Helsinki, Finland	Materials	13.0	0.6	19.3	7.2
25 (845)	SKF	Gothenburg, Sweden	Manufacturing	9.6	0.9	8.5	11.5
26 (902)	Stora Enso	Helsinki, Finland	Manufacturing	14.2	0.4	16.7	6.0
27 (904)	Svenska Cellulosa Aktiebolaget	Stockholm, Sweden	Consumer Goods	11.8	0.1	20.2	12.5
28 (937)	Kone	Espoo, Finland	Engineering	9.5	1.2	8.4	14.9
29 (1098)	Electrolux	Stockholm, Sweden	Manufacturing	14.7	0.3	10.7	6.8
30 (1101)	Assa Abloy	Stockholm, Sweden	Manufacturing	6.1	0.6	8.1	11.2
32 (1131)	Investor	Stockholm, Sweden	Diversified financials	2.8	-1.3	31.2	17.0
32 (1170)	Tele2	Stockholm, Sweden	Telecommunications	5.9	0.7	6.4	8.6
33 (1175)	Metso	Helsinki, Finland	Capital goods	8.6	0.5	8.4	7.3
34 (1226)	Autoliv	Stockholm, Sweden	Automotive	8.2	0.6	6.1	6.2
35 (1254)	Orkla Group	Oslo, Norway	Media	10.2	-0.1	11.1	8.2
36 (1297)	Kinnevik	Stockholm, Sweden	Investment	1.3	1.0	10.2	6.3
37 (1363)	Storebrand	Oslo, Norway	Insurance	5.6	0.1	67.2	2.4
38 (1373)	TDC A/S	Copenhagen, Denmark	Telecommunications	4.6	0.5	11.4	6.0
39 (1376)	OP-Pohjola Group	Helsinki, Finland	Financial services	4.9	0.3	53.3	3.7
40 (1388)	Aker Solutions	Oslo, Norway	Engineering	6.1	0.9	5.6	4.5
41 (1416)	Gjensidige	Oslo, Norway	Insurance	3.6	0.5	14.7	5.9
42 (1481)	L E Lundbergföretagen	Stockholm, Sweden	Investment	3.3	0.7	12.5	4.2
43 (1488)	Alfa Laval	Lund, Sweden	Manufacturing	4.2	0.5	4.8	8.7
44 (1495)	Neste	Espoo, Finland	Oil refining	20.0	0.2	9.4	3.1
45 (1506)	Wärtsilä	Helsinki, Finland	Manufacturing	5.6	0.6	5.8	7.2
46 (1619)	Boliden AB	Stockholm, Sweden	Mining	5.8	0.5	5.5	4.6
47 (1686)	Jyske Bank	Silkeborg, Denmark	Banking	1.6	0.1	47.2	2.4
48 (1750)	Swedish Match	Stockholm, Sweden	Tobacco	1.7	0.4	2.1	8.1
49 (1816)	Hexagon AB	Stockholm, Sweden	Technology	2.8	0.4	6.8	7.0
50 (1868)	Nokian Tyres	Nokia, Finland	Manufacturing	1.9	0.4	2.4	6.4
51 (1883)	Kesko	Helsinki, Finland	Retail	12.3	0.2	5.4	3.2
52 (1889)	Novozymes	Copenhagen, Denmark	Health care	1.8	0.3	2.4	7.9
53 (1929)	Sydbank	Aabenraa, Denmark	Banking	1.0	0.0	26.8	1.4
54 (1935)	Getinge Group	Getinge, Sweden	Medical technology	3.2	0.4	6.0	6.6
55 (1937)	Coloplast	Copenhagen, Denmark	Medical equipment	1.8	0.3	1.6	7.3
56 (1948)	Vestas	Aarhus, Denmark	Manufacturing	7.6	-0.2	9.6	2.3

== Divided by country ==
To put a perspective on the differences between the number of companies in the Nordic nations, this list shows the annual number of companies from a given nation, that made the list. Note that Iceland is no longer represented, primarily because of the 2008–2012 Icelandic financial crisis in which several banks collapsed.

Country	2008-list	2009-list	2010-list	2011-list	2012-list
Sweden	20	22	27	22	25
Finland	16	13	11	12	12
Norway	14	9	10	10	9
Denmark	9	12	13	10	10
Iceland	4	0	0	0	0

== Largest employers ==
This is a list of the largest employers in the Nordic nations, based on the most recent annual reports. Both private and public companies are represented on the list, though public employers are not. IKEA would rank 4 on this list with its 123,000 employees, had its official headquarters been in Sweden instead of in the Netherlands.

Rank	Company	Headquarters	Industry	Employees	Reference date
1	ISS	Copenhagen, Denmark	Facility Management	534,500	2011
2	Securitas	Stockholm, Sweden	Security Services	335,945	2016
3	Nokia	Espoo, Finland	Technology	130,050	2011
4	Maersk	Copenhagen, Denmark	Transportation	117,080	2011
5	Ericsson	Stockholm, Sweden	Telecommunication	104,525	2011
6	Volvo	Gothenburg, Sweden	Automotive	98,162	2011
7	H&M	Stockholm, Sweden	Retailing	64,874	2011
8	Electrolux	Stockholm, Sweden	Manufacturing	52,916	2011
9	Skanska	Stockholm, Sweden	Construction	52,557	2011
10	Sandvik	Sandviken, Sweden	Capital goods	50,030	2011
