= Global 500 =

Global 500 may refer to:

- Fortune Global 500, a list of the largest companies published by Fortune
- Global 500 Roll of Honour, an award given by the United Nations Environment Program
- Global 500 (internet), a list of the 500 most popular websites updated daily by Alexa Internet
- Financial Times Global 500, a list of the largest companies published by Financial Times
