= Ola Rollén =

Swedish entrepreneur and business executive (born 1965)

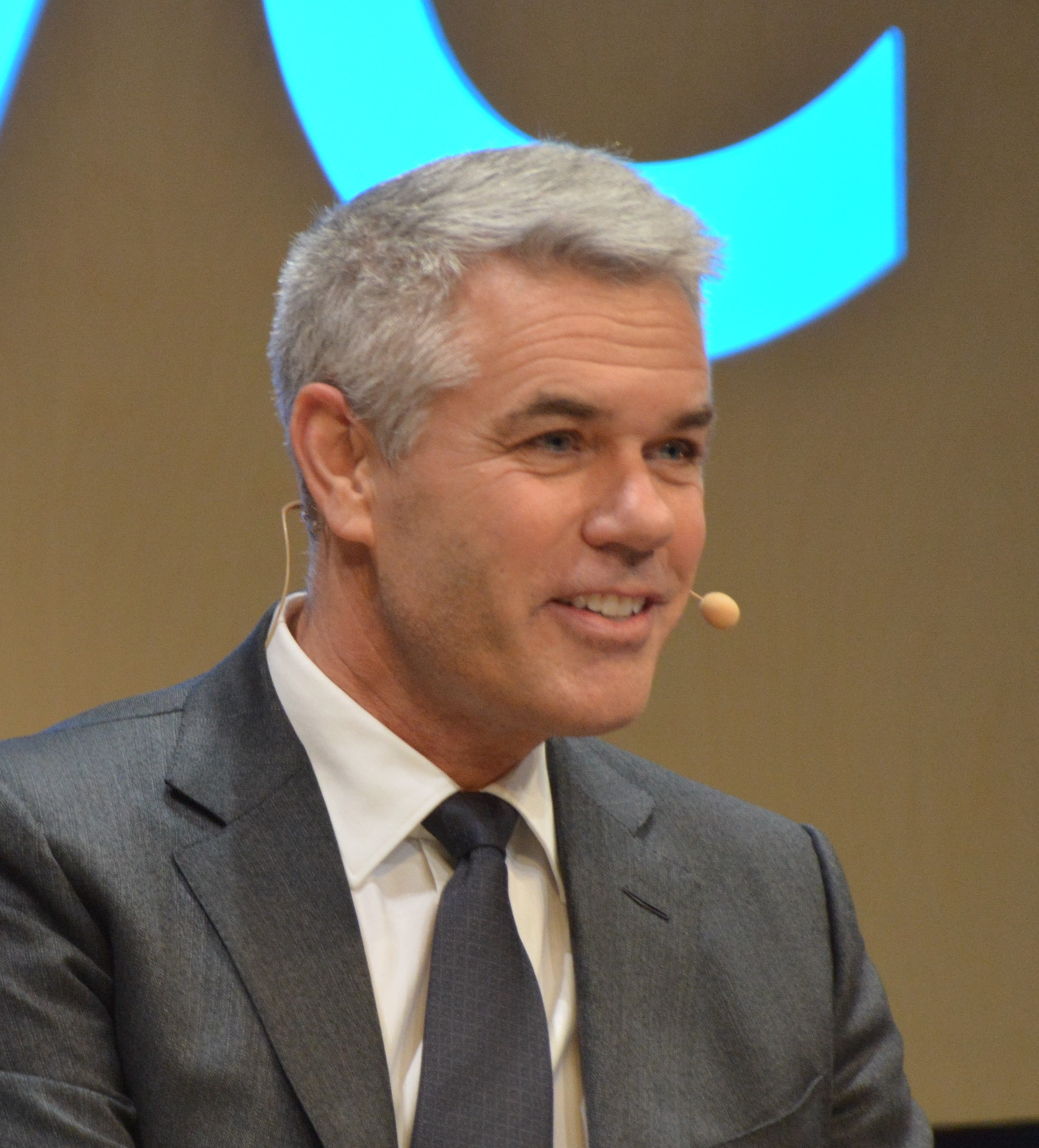
- Rollén in 2017
- Born: 1965 (age 59–60); Stockholm, Sweden
- Education: Stockholm University

Ola Rollén is a Swedish entrepreneur and businessman. He retired as CEO of Hexagon AB, a global technology firm on December 31, 2022.

== Early life and education ==
Rollén was born in Stockholm in 1965. He earned an undergraduate degree in finance and economics from Stockholm University in 1989.

== Career ==
After graduation, Rollén began his career at Stora AB in 1989 and later joined AB Kanthal in 1990.

In 1996, Ola Rollén became president of Kanthal. Two years later he changed jobs and became vice president at Avesta Sheffield. In 1999, he became CEO of Sandvik Stål (now Sandvik Materials Technology) in Sandviken.

The following year, Rollén was recruited by Melker Schörling to be CEO of Hexagon, which was then a conglomerate with limited growth prospects. Under Rollén's leadership, Hexagon expanded internationally through the acquisition of Brown & Sharpe, Leica Geosystems, Intergraph, and MSC Software to become a leader in advanced measurement technology. Hexagon has acquired more than 200 companies during Rollén's years as CEO, while balancing the company's portfolio with hardware and software products.

Hexagon also managed to create a successful Rubber compounding business Hexpol that was distributed to Hexagons shareholders in 2008 via an IPO on the Stockholm Stock Exchange.

In 2015, Rollén sold half of his shares in Hexagon to form the investment company Greenbridge Partners, which as of October 2015 owned 20% of Norwegian Next Biometrics. Melker Schörling, then chairman of Hexagon's Board of Directors, supported and invested in this new venture.

He has been named to the Harvard Business Review's “Best-Performing CEOs” list several times.

== Accusations of insider trading ==
In 2016, Rollén was accused of insider trading in Norway for buying shares in Next Biometrics in October 2015 on behalf of Greenbridge Partners, a transaction which did not involve Hexagon. He was prosecuted by the Norwegian economic crime authority (Økokrim) and acquitted by The Oslo City Court in a unanimous verdict announced 10 January 2018. Following Økokrim's appeal of the acquittal, Rollén was acquitted for a second time, this time by the Borgarting Court of Appeal (Borgarting lagmannsrett), rejecting all charges of insider trading. The second acquittal verdict was announced 26 June 2019. The prosecutor in the case stated that they will not challenge the verdict, making the acquittal final.
