= Intergraph =

American corporation

Intergraph Corporation
- Logo used from 2004 to 2010
- Type: Subsidiary
- Industry: Software, Geographic Information Systems
- Founded: 1969; 57 years ago
- Headquarters: Huntsville, Alabama, United States
- Key people: Ola Rollén, CEO; Mattias Stenberg, President, Hexagon Asset Lifecycle Intelligence (ALI); Steven Cost, President, Hexagon Safety & Infrastructure; Mladen Stojic, President, Hexagon Geospatial
- Revenue: ▲$808.4 million USD (2008)
- Number of employees: 4,000
- Parent: Hexagon AB
- Website: hexagonppm.com

Intergraph Corporation was an American software development and services company, which now forms part of Hexagon AB. It provides enterprise engineering and geospatially powered software to businesses, governments, and organizations around the world, and operates through three divisions: Hexagon Asset Lifecycle Intelligence (ALI, formerly PPM), Hexagon Safety & Infrastructure, and Hexagon Geospatial. The company's headquarters is in Huntsville, Alabama, United States.

In 2008, Intergraph was one of the one hundred largest software companies in the world. In July 2010, Intergraph was acquired by Hexagon AB.

== History ==
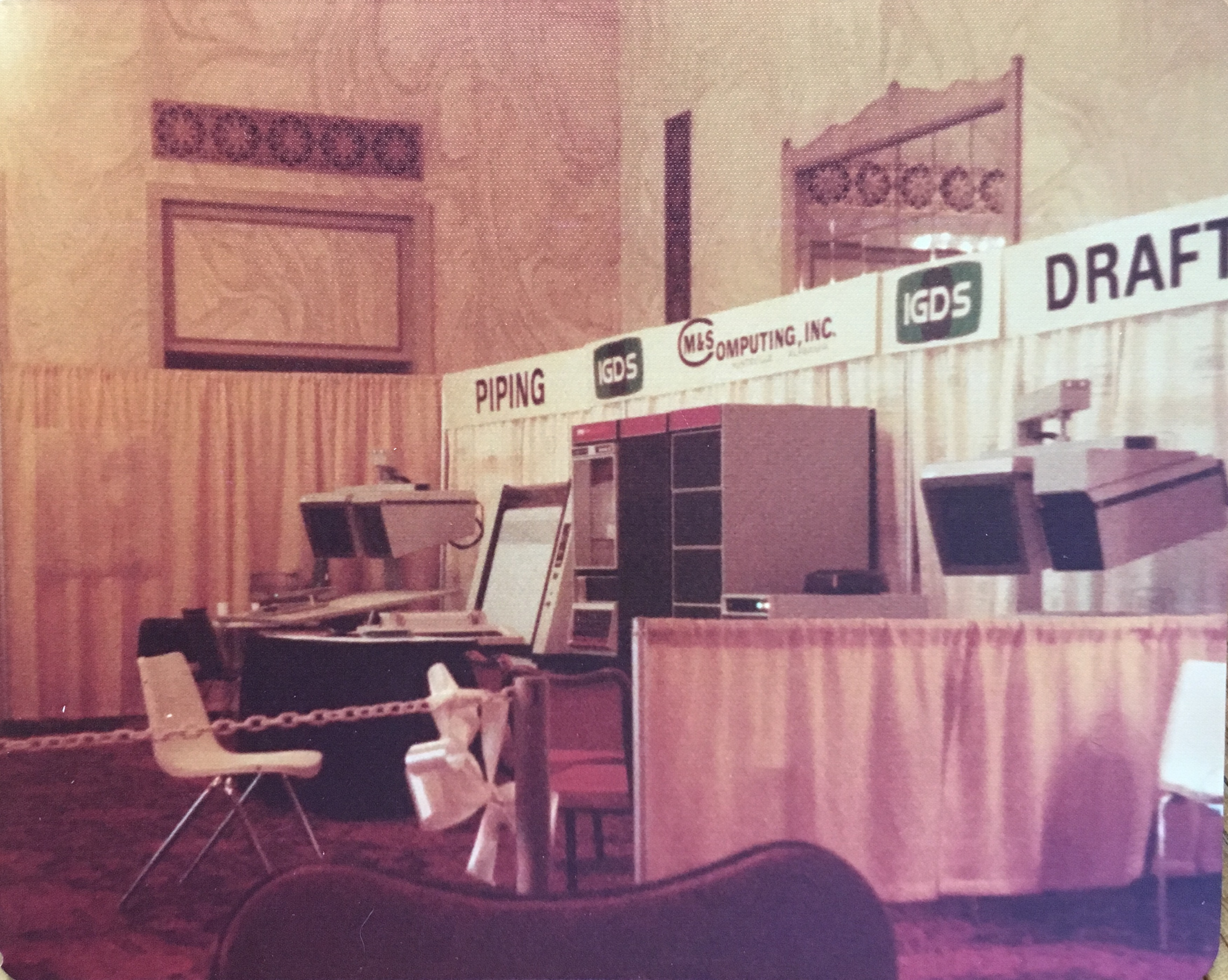
M&S Computing exhibit at a trade show in 1978

Logo used from 1980 to 2004

Intergraph was founded in 1969 as M&S Computing, Inc., by former IBM engineers Jim Meadlock, his wife Nancy, Terry Schansman (the S of M&S), Keith Schonrock, and Robert Thurber who had been working with NASA and the U.S. Army in developing systems that would apply digital computing to real time missile guidance. The company was later renamed to Intergraph Corporation in 1980.

One of Intergraph's major hardware projects was developing a line of workstations using the Clipper architecture created by Fairchild Semiconductor. Intergraph was one of only two companies to use the chips in a major product line. Intergraph developed its own version of UNIX for the architecture, which it called CLIX. In 1987, Intergraph bought the Fairchild division responsible for the chip.

In 1997, Intergraph began pursuing patent infringement litigation against Intel and other computer hardware manufacturers based on the intellectual property developed in Clipper. Intergraph negotiated major settlements with Intel, HP, Texas Instruments and Gateway, earning the company over $394M. In 2000, Intergraph exited the hardware business and became purely a software company. On July 21, 2000, it sold its Intense3D graphics accelerator division to 3Dlabs, and its workstation and server division to Silicon Graphics.

On November 29, 2006, Intergraph was acquired by an investor group led by Hellman & Friedman LLC, Texas Pacific Group and JMI Equity, making the company privately held. On October 28, 2010, Intergraph was acquired by Hexagon AB. The transaction marks the return of Intergraph as part of a publicly traded company.

As part of the Hexagon acquisition, Hexagon moved the management of ERDAS, Inc. from under Leica Geosystems to Intergraph, and Z/I Imaging airborne imaging sensors from under Intergraph to Leica Geosystems.

On December 2, 2013, the geospatial technology portfolio was split out from under the Intergraph Security, Government and Infrastructure division to form the Hexagon Geospatial division. On October 13, 2015, the Intergraph Security, Government & Infrastructure division was rebranded as Hexagon Safety & Infrastructure. On January 9, 2017, the Intergraph Government Solutions division was rebranded as Hexagon US Federal.

On June 5, 2017, the Intergraph Process, Power & Marine division was rebranded as Hexagon PPM.

On June 6, 2022, the Hexagon PPM division was rebranded as Hexagon Asset Lifecycle Intelligence.

In 2025, Hexagon AB initiated a spin-off of its Asset Lifecycle Intelligence and Safety, Infrastructure and Geospatial divisions. Along with ETQ and Bricsys, that spin-off became Octave, which today operates as a standalone company.
