= Hexagon AB =

Swedish tech company

- Type: Public (Aktiebolag)
- Traded as: Nasdaq Stockholm: HEXA B OMX Stockholm 30 component
- ISIN: SE0015961909
- Industry: CAD/CAM Software, Electronics, Enterprise Software, Geographic Information Systems (GIS), Software, Technology, Technology Consulting.
- Founded: 1975; 51 years ago
- Headquarters: Stockholm, Sweden
- Area served: Worldwide
- Key people: Anders Svensson, CEO
- Revenue: ▼3.7 bn EUR (2025)
- Operating income: ▲1,517.8 MEUR (2022)
- Total assets: ▲17.1 MEUR (2025)
- Number of employees: 24,000 (2025)
- Website: hexagon.com

Hexagon AB is a multinational industrial technology company. Headquartered in Stockholm, Sweden, and publicly traded on the Nasdaq Stockholm exchange, the company since 2000 has had a particular focus on measuring technology and geospatial tools and software. After its founding, between 2000 and 2022, Hexagon completed more than 170 acquisitions, and it is the parent company of Leica Geosystems and Infor EAM, among other subsidiaries. With around 24,000 employees, the company reported net sales of approximately 3.7 billion EUR and total assets of 17.1 billion in 2025.

== History ==
=== 1975–2012 ===
Headquartered in Stockholm, Sweden, the predecessor company of Hexagon AB was founded on August 29, 1970 . The company was described as a "sprawling conglomerate" investing in diverse industries, for example seafood imports, vehicle hydraulics, and day-care centers. Financier Melker Schörling bought a controlling stake in the company in 1998, and aimed to focus the company's investments.

In 2000, Ola Rollén, former CEO of Kanthal, was appointed by Schörling to be CEO of Hexagon AB. The company began acquiring companies focused on precision measurement technology and software, and divesting in other areas. In late 2001, Hexagon AB agreed to buy Brown & Sharpe, a US company focused on metrological tools, for around US$180 million. Hexagon AB also acquired Leica Geosystems after counter-bidding against Danaher for the company in 2005. Hexagon AB acquired the Israel-based 3D optics company CogniTens Ltd in 2007. The software company Intergraph was acquired by Hexagon AB in July 2010 for US$2.1 billion.

=== 2013–2021 ===
Hexagon AB acquired Vero Software in 2014. In 2016, the top five shareholders in Hexagon included Schörling, Ramsbury Invest, SSB CI Omnibus, Swedbank Robur Fonder and JPM Chase. Schorling served as chairman, although he stepped down in October 2016 due to health issues. Hexagon purchased MSC Software for US$834 million in 2017, using the acquisition to boost its portfolio of products related to automated manufacturing. In 2018, Hexagon acquired both AGTEK and Spring Technologies SAS.

In 2016, Hexagon's CEO Ola Rollén was detained in Sweden over allegations of insider trading. The transaction did not involve Hexagon and he continued to serve as CEO of Hexagon. Rollén was acquitted in 2018, then again found not guilty by an Oslo appeals court in 2019. Hexagon acquired Infor EAM, a program developed by Infor, from Koch in 2021. Hexagon paid US$800 million in cash and shares worth $1.95 billion for the purchase, giving Koch a 5% stake in Hexagon.

=== 2022–2025 ===
Ola Rollén stepped down as Hexagon CEO at the end of 2022, becoming chairman of the board. Former COO Paolo Guglielmini became president and CEO. Hexagon purchased Hard-Line, a radio system company based in Ontario, in July 2023, and in November 2023, Hexagon led a US$230 million funding round in the industrial AI company Divergent Technologies. Hexagon's revenues in 2023 were US$5.5 billion. Assets were $18.1 billion, profits were $1.1 billion, and the company listed 24,000 employees in 50 countries.

On November 11, 2024, it was announced that Paolo Guglielmini was stepping down as CEO and that Norbert Hanke would be serving as interim CEO. Hexagon also announced its exploration of a possible split of the company into Hexagon AB and a new corporation, which would focus on Enterprise Industrial Software. On the 20th of January the following year Hexagon announced that Anders Svensson would take over the position of President and CEO. He officially took office on July 20.

In September 2025, Cadence Design Systems announced it would acquire the design and engineering business of Hexagon for €2.7 billion (approximately $3.16 billion) in a stock-and-cash deal. The acquisition includes MSC Software which Hexagon acquired in 2017.

== Products and services ==
Hexagon is a technology and software firm known for specializing in measurement and positioning systems. According to Reuters in 2023, Hexagon's products are used for "measurement and quality inspection in manufacturing processes and engineering plant design, as well as in infrastructure planning, construction, mining, agriculture and energy." With Hexagon developing what it calls "ecosystems" of software programs and technologies for specific purposes, in 2023, the company's official website stated it sold products catered to the following industries: autonomous mobility, buildings, cities and nations, defense, farms, industrial facilities, infrastructure, manufacturing, and mines.

== Divisions ==
Hexagon AB is organized into divisions, listing five internal divisions on its website: Asset Lifecycle Intelligence, Autonomous Solutions, Geosystems, Manufacturing Intelligence, and Safety, Infrastructure & Geospatial.

=== List of acquisitions and subsidiaries ===
Between 2000 and 2022, Hexagon completed more than 170 acquisitions. The following table lists major acquisitions by year, also noting the division of Hexagon AB that the acquisition was made a part of.

Year	Company	Country	Hexagon division
2000	Cubic-Tavleproduktion	Denmark	
2000	Wilcox & Associates	US	Manufacturing Intelligence
2000	HTR Hydrauliikka	Finland	
2001	Brown & Sharpe	US	Manufacturing Intelligence
2002	MIRAI S.R.L	Italy	
2002	Quality Ltda	Brazil	
2002	CE Johansson	Sweden	Manufacturing Intelligence
2002	Xygent	US	Manufacturing Intelligence
2002	GFD Technology	Germany	
2004	Korea ErFa Systems Eng – Business	South Korea	
2004	Romer	France	Manufacturing Intelligence
2004	GPD Sprl – Assets	Italy	
2004	Thona Group	Belgium	
2005	Trostel SEG	US	
2005	Leica Geosystems	Switzerland	Geosystems
2006	Mikrofyn	Denmark	Geosystems
2007	Gesswein	Germany	
2007	Agatec SAS	France	
2007	Jingjiang Measuring Tool Company	China	Manufacturing Intelligence
2007	Transmetal	Turkey	
2007	Allen Precision Equipment	US	Geosystems
2007	NovAtel	Canada	Autonomy & Positioning
2007	Elcome Technologies	India	Geosystems
2007	Gold Key Processing	US	
2007	Ionic Software	Belgium	
2007	Earth Resource Mapping	Australia	
2007	GAMFI International	France	
2007	Svensk ByggnadsGeodesi	Sweden	Geosystems
2007	CogniTens Ltd	Israel	Manufacturing Intelligence
2008	Messtechnik Wetzlar	Germany	Manufacturing Intelligence
2008	Santiago & Cintra Ibérica	Spain	
2008	m&h Group	Germany	Manufacturing Intelligence
2008	Viewserve	Sweden	Geosystems
2008	Serein Metrology	US	Manufacturing Intelligence
2009	Technodigit	France	Manufacturing Intelligence
2009	Mahr Multisensor GmbH	Germany	
2009	MYCRONA GmbH	Germany	
2010	Intergraph	US	Safety, Infrastructure & Geospatial/ Asset Lifecycle Intelligence
2012	Microsurvey	Canada	Geosystems
2012	myVR	Norway	CORP
2012	GTA Geoinformatik	Germany	
2013	Pixis	Chile	Asset Lifecycle Intelligence
2013	Airborne Hydrography AB	Sweden	Geosystems
2013	Devex	Brazil	Mining
2013	Navgeocom	Russia	Geosystems
2013	LISTECH	Australia	Geosystems
2013	New River Kinematics (NRK)	US	Manufacturing Intelligence
2013	MANFRA	Brazil	Geosystems
2014	Veripos	UK	Autonomy & Positioning
2014	Aibotix	Germany	Geosystems
2014	HostSure	Ireland	Asset Lifecycle Intelligence
2014	iLab	Brazil	VEN
2014	Mintec	US	Mining
2014	North West Geomatics Ltd. (North West Group)	Canada	Geosystems
2014	SAFEmine	Switzerland	Mining
2014	Arvus	Brazil	iHub
2014	Vero Software	UK	Manufacturing Intelligence
2015	EcoSys	US	Asset Lifecycle Intelligence
2015	Q-DAS	Germany	Manufacturing Intelligence
2015	CAMTECH GmbH & Co KG	Germany	Manufacturing Intelligence
2016	Apodius GmbH	Germany	Manufacturing Intelligence
2016	Forming Technology, Inc.	Canada	Manufacturing Intelligence
2016	Multivista	US	Geosystems
2016	SigmaSpace Corporation	US	Safety, Infrastructure & Geospatial
2016	SCCS Survey	UK	Geosystems
2016	AICON 3D Systems	Germany	Manufacturing Intelligence
2016	NESTIX Oy	Finland	Asset Lifecycle Intelligence
2017	Catavolt, Inc	US	VENT
2017	Luciad	Belgium	Safety, Infrastructure & Geospatial
2017	MiPlan	Australia	Mining
2017	MSC Software	US	Manufacturing Intelligence
2017	VIRES GmbH	Germany	Manufacturing Intelligence
2017	DST Computer Services	Switzerland	Asset Lifecycle Intelligence
2018	AGTEK	US	Geosystems
2018	AutonomouStuff	US	Autonomy & Positioning
2018	Bricsys	Belgium	Asset Lifecycle Intelligence
2018	Guardvant	US	Mining
2018	Nextsense	Austria	Manufacturing Intelligence
2018	Spring Technologies SAS	France	Manufacturing Intelligence
2019	J5 International	Isle of Man	Asset Lifecycle Intelligence
2019	Etalon AG	Germany	Manufacturing Intelligence
2019	Thermopylae Sciences & Technology LLC	US	GSP
2019	Split Engineering	US	Mining
2019	AMendate	Germany	Manufacturing Intelligence
2019	Volume Graphics	Germany	Manufacturing Intelligence
2020	Blast Movement Technology (BMT)	Australia	Mining
2020	Geopraevent	Switzerland	Geosystems
2020	Romax	UK	Manufacturing Intelligence
2020	PAS Global	US	Asset Lifecycle Intelligence
2020	Tacticaware	Czech Republic	Geosystems
2020	ESPRIT CAM	US	Manufacturing Intelligence
2020	CAEfatigue	UK	Manufacturing Intelligence
2020	OxBlue	US	Geosystems
2021	Infor EAM	US	Asset Lifecycle Intelligence
2021	Immersal	Finland	Geosystems
2021	CADLM	France	Manufacturing Intelligence
2022	ETQ	US	Manufacturing Intelligence
2022	Innovatia Accelerator	Canada	Asset Lifecycle Intelligence
2022	Minnovare	Australia	Mining
2022	iConstruct Pty Ltd	Australia	Asset Lifecycle Intelligence
2022	PDSA Company Limited	Ghana	Geosystems
2023	Qognify	US	Safety, Infrastructure & Geospatial
2023	CADS Additive	Austria	Manufacturing Intelligence
2023	Projectmates	US	Geosystems
2023	Hard-Line	Canada	Mining
2024	Xwatch	UK	Geosystems
2024	Itus Digital	US	Asset Lifecycle Intelligence
2024	Voyansi	US	Geosystems
2024	indurad	Germany	Autonomous Solutions
2025	Septentrio	Belgium	Autonomous Solutions
2025	CONET Communications GmbH	Germany	Safety, Infrastructure & Geospatial

== See also ==
- List of largest Swedish companies
- List of largest Nordic companies
- S&P Europe 350 Dividend Aristocrats
- Internet of things
