= Bentley Infrastructure 500 =

Bentley Infrastructure 500 is a ranking of infrastructure owners compiled by the CAD software company Bentley Systems. It was first published in 2010. The index ranks the combined infrastructure assets in the hands of the biggest public and private organisations.

In contrast to the Forbes Global 2000 ranking, the Bentley Infrastructure 500 ranks companies according to their reported tangible fixed assets (or other comparable noncurrent physical assets such as buildings or fixed structures, land, and machinery) - and is a direct measure of the infrastructure owned and operated by an organization. The aim of the ranking is to help global constituents appreciate and explore the magnitude of investment in infrastructure and the potential to continually increase the return on that investment. The Infrastructure 500 index also takes into consideration governments and states.

== 2014 list ==
Rank	Organization	Headquarters Country	Infrastructure Value (millions USD)
1	Federal government of the United States	United States	360,900
2	GAZPROM	Russia	248,401
3	ExxonMobil	United States	243,650
4	Petrobras	Brazil	227,433
5	Royal Dutch Shell	United Kingdom	191,897
6	China National Petroleum Corporation	China	190,424
7	Highways Agency	United Kingdom	185,875
8	Électricité de France - EDF	France	172,839
9	Chevron	United States	164,829
10	Rosneft	Russia	162,852
11	Korea Electric Power Corporation	South Korea	154,133
12	BP	United Kingdom	133,690
13	Pemex - Petróleos Mexicanos	Mexico	130,837
14	PDVSA - Petróleos De Venezuela	Venezuela	128,535
15	Commonwealth of Australia	Australia	119,327
16	State of California	United States	118,627
17	Walmart	United States	117,907
18	Kingdom of the Netherlands	Netherlands	114,597
19	Enel	Italy	111,776
20	AT&T	United States	110,968

*As measured by reported net tangible fixed assets.

== 2013 list ==
Rank	Organization	Headquarters Country	Infrastructure Value (millions USD)*
1	Federal government of the United States	United States	342,900
2	State Grid Corporation of China	China	236,012
3	GAZPROM	Russia	228,366
4	ExxonMobil	United States	226,949
5	Petrobras	Brazil	204,962
6	Royal Dutch Shell	Netherlands	172,293
7	Highways Agency	United Kingdom	166,985
8	Électricité de France - EDF	France	161,286
9	Chevron Corporation	United States	141,348
10	Petroleos Mexicanos	Mexico	127,449
11	Kingdom of the Netherlands	Netherlands	118,205
12	Walmart	United States	116,681
13	BP	United Kingdom	115,421
14	Korea Electric Power Corporation	Korea	113,498
15	GDF Suez	France	113,416
16	Commonwealth of Australia	Australia	113,386
17	State of California	United States	112,470
18	AT&T	United States	109,767
19	Enel	Italy	109,662
20	Tokyo Electric Power Company	Japan	106,365

*As measured by reported net tangible fixed assets.

== 2011 list ==
Rank	Organization	Headquarters Country	Infrastructure Value (millions USD)
1	Federal government of the United States	United States	308,800
2	State Grid Corporation of China	China	209,727
3	ExxonMobil	United States	199,548
4	GAZPROM	Russia	180,019
5	Petrobras	Brazil	167,777
6	Électricité de France - EDF	France	143,241
7	Nippon Telegraph and Telephone	Japan	119,098
8	Kingdom of the Netherlands	Netherlands	117,060
9	Royal Dutch Shell	Netherlands	117,060
10	Walmart	United States	107,878
11	Tokyo Electric Power Company	Japan	106,455
12	BP	United Kingdom	105,887
13	Chevron Corporation	United States	104,504
14	Enel	Italy	104,349
15	GDF Suez	France	104,317
16	State of California	United States	104,107
17	Ferrovie dello Stato	Italy	103,903
18	AT&T	United States	103,196
19	State of Texas	United States	92,214
20	ENI	Italy	90,065

== 2010 list ==
Rank	Organization	Headquarters Country	Infrastructure Value (millions USD)
1	Federal government of the United States	United States	282,700
2	Électricité de France - EDF	France	186,466
3	GAZPROM	Russia	161,813
4	Petrochina Company Limited	China	155,973
5	ExxonMobil	United States	139,116
6	Petrobras	Brazil	132,286
7	Royal Dutch Shell	Netherlands	129,149
8	United States Department of the Army	United States	122,145
9	Enel	Italy	113,951
10	Nippon Telegraph and Telephone	Japan	107,856
11	Tokyo Electric Power Company	Japan	106,455
12	BP	United Kingdom	103,686
13	Walmart	United States	102,307
14	State of California	United States	102,201
15	Ferrovie dello Stato	Italy	101,660
16	AT&T	United States	100,093
17	GDF Suez	France	99,457
18	Chevron Corporation	United States	96,468
19	China Petrochemical Corporation	China	96,105
20	Verizon Communications	United States	91,466

Infrastructure Value above as measured by reported net tangible fixed assets.

== Key findings ==
The Bentley Infrastructure 500 index shows little correlation with the Forbes 2000 - showing that the biggest companies in the world are not necessarily the biggest owners of fixed assets.

The 2010 study showed that the combined assets of all the 500 companies add up to US$ 13 trillion, which is equivalent to annual GDP of the United States. Other interesting relations compiled by CAD Analyst

- the largest commercial facilities owner is No. 13, Wal-Mart Stores, at $102.3 billion (Forbes 2000 No. 14);
- the largest state government infrastructure owner is No. 14, Government of California, at $102.2 billion (Public Entity - not in Forbes);
- the largest rail owner is No. 15, Ferrovie dello Stato, at $101.6 billion (Public Entity - not in Forbes);
- the largest manufacturing owner is No. 31, Toyota, at $71.9 billion (Forbes 2000 No. 360);
- the largest mineral resources owner is No. 36, Brazilian Vale do Rio Doce, at $66.1 billion (Forbes 2000 No. 80);
- the largest infrastructure owner in India is No. 81, Reliance Industries, at $38.1 billion (Forbes 2000 No. 126);
- the largest private infrastructure investor is No. 89, Ferrovial, at $35.9 billion (Forbes 2000 No. 748);
- the largest bank owner is No. 128, Royal Bank of Scotland Group, at $25.3 billion (Forbes 2000 No. 385);
- the largest private water infrastructure owner is No. 322, Kemble Water Holdings, at $14.3 billion (did not make the Forbes 2000).

== See also ==
- Financial Times Global 500
- Forbes Global 2000
- Fortune Global 500
