= Diversified financial =

Diversified financials is a specific category of the Global Industry Classification Standard (GICS) that is used by the financial community. It includes a range of consumer and commercially oriented companies offering a wide variety of financial products and services, including various lending products (such as home equity loans and credit cards), insurance, and securities and investment products.

Many of these firms in this category are non-banking financial companies, specialist organisations like stock exchanges or financial holding companies that were created through consolidation of banks, insurance companies and brokerage firms to become universal banks.

There are concerns that diversified financial services firms contribute to speculation.

== Classification within GICS ==
Under the Global Industry Classification Standard (GICS), diversified financials are classified within the broader Financial Services industry group. MSCI and S&P Dow Jones Indices define Diversified Financial Services as providers of a diverse range of financial services and/or firms with interests across banking, insurance, and capital markets, but without a single dominant business line.

The same methodology distinguishes diversified financial services firms from more specialized GICS sub-industries such as diversified banks, commercial and residential mortgage finance, and investment banking and brokerage.
