= Forbes Global 2000 =

Annual ranking of the top 2000 public companies published by Forbes magazine

The Forbes Global 2000 is an annual ranking of the top 2000 public companies in the world, published by Forbes magazine. "The Global 2000" annual ranking is assembled by Forbes using an assessment of four equally-weighted metrics: sales, profit, assets and market value. The list has been published annually since 2003.

== 2026 list ==
In 2026, the ten largest companies as calculated by this method were:

1. (United States) JPMorgan Chase
2. (United States) Amazon
3. (United States) Berkshire Hathaway
4. (United States) Alphabet
5. (Saudi Arabia) Saudi Aramco
6. Industrial and Commercial Bank of China
7. (United States) Bank of America
8. (United States) Microsoft
9. China Construction Bank
10. Agricultural Bank of China

=== By country ===
Forbes Global 2000 as of 2026:

| Rank | Country/region | Companies | Highest-ranked company |
|---|---|---|---|
| 1 | United States | 593 | JPMorgan Chase |
| 2 | China | 300 | ICBC |
| 3 | Japan | 179 | Toyota |
| 4 | United Kingdom | 67 | Shell |
| 5 | South Korea | 66 | Samsung Electronics |
| 6 | Canada | 64 | Royal Bank of Canada |
| 6 | India | 64 | Reliance Industries |
| 8 | Germany | 49 | Volkswagen Group |
| 9 | France | 45 | TotalEnergies |
| 10 | Taiwan | 44 | Taiwan Semiconductor |
| 11 | Switzerland | 42 | Nestlé |
| 12 | Hong Kong | 40 | China Mobile |
| 13 | Australia | 32 | BHP |
| 14 | Italy | 27 | Eni |
| 15 | Netherlands | 24 | Stellantis |
| 16 | Sweden | 23 | Volvo |
| 17 | Brazil | 21 | Petrobras |
| 17 | Ireland | 21 | Accenture |
| 19 | Spain | 20 | Santander |
| 20 | Saudi Arabia | 18 | Saudi Aramco |
| 20 | Thailand | 16 | PTT |
| 22 | United Arab Emirates | 16 | First Abu Dhabi Bank |
| 23 | Singapore | 14 | Oversea-Chinese Banking Corporation |
| 24 | Mexico | 13 | América Móvil |
| 25 | South Africa | 12 | FirstRand |
| 26 | Israel | 11 | Bank Leumi |
| 26 | Denmark | 11 | Møller-Maersk |
| 28 | Finland | 10 | Nordea Bank |
| 29 | Norway | 9 | Equinor |
| 29 | Turkey | 9 | Koç Holding |
| 31 | Indonesia | 8 | Bank Rakyat Indonesia |
| 31 | Malaysia | 8 | Maybank |
| 31 | Chile | 8 | Falabella |
| 34 | Belgium | 7 | Anheuser-Busch InBev |
| 34 | Philippines | 7 | SM Investments |
| 36 | Austria | 6 | OMV Group |
| 36 | Poland | 6 | PKN Orlen |
| 38 | Colombia | 5 | Ecopetrol |
| 38 | Greece | 5 | Eurobank Ergasias |
| 38 | Portugal | 5 | EDP - Energias de Portugal |
| 41 | Vietnam | 4 | Joint Stock Commercial Bank for Foreign Trade of Vietnam |
| 41 | Peru | 4 | Credicorp |
| 41 | Luxembourg | 4 | ArcelorMittal |
| 44 | Kazakhstan | 3 | Kaspi.kz JSC |
| 45 | Hungary | 2 | MOL Hungarian Oil |
| 45 | Czech Republic | 2 | Cez Group |
| 45 | Morocco | 2 | Attijariwafa Bank |
| 45 | Qatar | 2 | Qatar National Bank |
| 50 | Nigeria | 1 | Dangote Cement |
| 50 | Argentina | 1 | YPF |
| 50 | Uruguay | 1 | MercadoLibre |
| 50 | Bermuda | 1 | Arch Capital Group |
| 50 | Cayman Islands | 1 | Nu Holdings |
| 50 | Kuwait | 1 | Kuwait Finance House |
| 50 | Egypt | 1 | Commercial International Bank |
| 50 | Jordan | 1 | Arab Bank |
| 50 | Oman | 1 | Bank Muscat |
| 50 | Pakistan | 1 | Pakistan State Oil |

== 2025 list ==
In 2025, the ten largest companies as calculated by this method were:

1. (United States) JPMorgan Chase
2. (United States) Berkshire Hathaway
3. Industrial and Commercial Bank of China
4. (Saudi Arabia) Saudi Aramco
5. (United States) Amazon
6. (United States) Bank of America
7. China Construction Bank
8. Agricultural Bank of China
9. (United States) Alphabet
10. (United States) Microsoft

== 2024 list ==
In 2024, the ten largest companies as calculated by this method were:

1. (United States) JPMorgan Chase
2. (United States) Berkshire Hathaway
3. (Saudi Arabia) Saudi Aramco
4. Industrial and Commercial Bank of China
5. (United States) Bank of America
6. (United States) Amazon
7. China Construction Bank
8. (United States) Microsoft
9. Agricultural Bank of China
10. (United States) Alphabet

== 2023 list ==
In 2023, the ten largest companies as calculated by this method were:

2023 top ten
| Rank | Company | Headquarters | Industry | Sales (billion $) | Profits (billion $) | Assets (billion $) |
|---|---|---|---|---|---|---|
| 1 | JPMorgan Chase | New York | Banking, financial services | 179.93 | 41.8 | 3,700 |
| 2 | Saudi Aramco | Dhahran | Oil and gas | 393.16 | 61.69 | 3694 |
| 3 | Citigroup | New York | Banking, financial services | 216.77 | 52.47 | 6,100 |
| 4 | Industrial and Commercial Bank of China | Beijing | Banking, financial services | 203.08 | 48.25 | 5,000 |
| 5 | China Construction Bank | Beijing | Banking, financial services | 186.14 | 37.92 | 5,400 |
| 7 | Alphabet | Mountain View, California | Conglomerate | 282.85 | 58.59 | 369.5 |
| 6 | Bank of America | Charlotte | Banking, financial services | 133.84 | 28.62 | 3,200 |
| 8 | Berkshire Hathaway | Omaha | Conglomerate | 589.47 | 156.36 | 653.9 |
| 9 | Microsoft | Redmond | Software | 207.59 | 69.02 | 380.1 |
| 10 | Apple Inc. | Cupertino | Consumer Electronics, Software, Services | 385.1 | 94.32 | 332.2 |

== 2022 list ==
In 2022, the ten largest companies as calculated by this method were:

2022 top ten
| Rank | Company | Headquarters | Industry | Sales (billion $) | Profits (billion $) | Assets (billion $) | Market value (billion $) |
|---|---|---|---|---|---|---|---|
| 1 | Berkshire Hathaway | Omaha | Conglomerate | 276.1 | 89.9 | 958.8 | 741.5 |
| 2 | Industrial and Commercial Bank of China | Beijing | Banking, financial Service | 208.1 | 54.0 | 5,518.5 | 214.4 |
| 3 | Saudi Aramco | Dhahran | Oil and gas | 400.4 | 105.4 | 576.0 | 2,292.1 |
| 4 | JPMorgan Chase | New York | Banking, financial services | 124.5 | 42.1 | 3,954.7 | 374.5 |
| 5 | China Construction Bank | Beijing | Banking, financial services | 202.1 | 46.9 | 4,747.0 | 181.3 |
| 6 | Amazon.com, Inc. | Seattle | Conglomerate | 469.8 | 33.4 | 420.6 | 1,468.4 |
| 7 | Apple Inc. | Cupertino | Consumer Electronics, Software, Services | 678.7 | 100.6 | 381.2 | 2,640.3 |
| 8 | Citigroup | New York | Banking, financial services | 181.4 | 37.4 | 4,561.1 | 133.4 |
| 9 | Bank of America | Charlotte | Banking, financial services | 96.8 | 31.0 | 3,238.2 | 303.1 |
| 10 | Toyota | Toyota, Aichi | Automotive | 281.8 | 28.2 | 552.5 | 237.7 |

== 2021 list ==
In 2021, the ten largest companies as calculated by this method were:

2021 top ten
| Rank | Company | Headquarters | Industry | Sales (billion $) | Profits (billion $) | Assets (billion $) | Market value (billion $) |
|---|---|---|---|---|---|---|---|
| 1 | Industrial and Commercial Bank of China | Beijing | Banking, financial Service | 190.5 | 45.8 | 4914.7 | 249.5 |
| 2 | JPMorgan Chase | New York City | Banking, financial services | 136.2 | 40.4 | 3689.3 | 464.8 |
| 3 | Berkshire Hathaway | Omaha | Banking, financial services | 245.5 | 42.5 | 873.7 | 624.4 |
| 4 | China Construction Bank | Beijing | Banking, financial services | 173.5 | 39.3 | 4301.7 | 210.4 |
| 5 | Saudi Aramco | Dhahran | Oil and gas | 229.7 | 49.3 | 510.3 | 1897.2 |
| 6 | Apple Inc. | Cupertino | Consumer Electronics, Software, Services | 294 | 63.9 | 354.1 | 2252.3 |
| 6 | Bank of America | Charlotte | Banking, financial services | 98.8 | 17.9 | 2832.2 | 336.3 |
| 6 | Ping An Insurance | Shenzhen | Financial services | 169.1 | 20.8 | 1453.8 | 211.2 |
| 9 | Citigroup | New York | Banking, financial services | 153.9 | 31.3 | 4159.9 | 140.1 |
| 10 | Amazon.com, Inc. | Seattle | Conglomerate | 386.1 | 21.3 | 321.2 | 1711.8 |

== 2020 list ==
In 2020, the ten largest companies as calculated by this method were:

2020 top ten
| Rank | Company | Headquarters | Industry | Sales (billion $) | Profits (billion $) | Assets (billion $) | Market value (billion $) |
|---|---|---|---|---|---|---|---|
| 1 | Industrial and Commercial Bank of China | Beijing | Banking, financial services | 177.2 | 45.3 | 4322.5 | 242.3 |
| 2 | China Construction Bank | Beijing | Banking, financial services | 162.1 | 38.9 | 3822 | 203.8 |
| 3 | JPMorgan Chase | New York City | Banking, financial services | 142.9 | 30 | 3139.4 | 291.7 |
| 4 | Berkshire Hathaway | Omaha | Banking, financial services | 254.6 | 81.4 | 817.7 | 455.4 |
| 5 | Citigroup | New York | Banking, financial services | 148.7 | 30.9 | 3697.5 | 147.2 |
| 6 | Saudi Aramco | Dhahran | Oil and gas | 329.8 | 88.2 | 398.3 | 1284.8 |
| 7 | Ping An Insurance | Shenzhen | Financial services | 155 | 18.8 | 1218.6 | 187.2 |
| 8 | Bank of America | Charlotte | Banking, financial services | 112.1 | 24.1 | 2620 | 208.6 |
| 9 | Apple Inc. | Cupertino | Consumer Electronics, Software, Services | 267.7 | 57.2 | 320.4 | 1285.5 |
| 10 | Bank of China | Beijing | Banking, financial services | 135.4 | 27.2 | 3387 | 112.8 |

== 2019 list ==
In 2019, the ten largest companies as calculated by this method were:

2019 top ten
| Rank | Company | Headquarters | Industry | Sales (billion $) | Profits (billion $) | Assets (billion $) | Market value (billion $) |
|---|---|---|---|---|---|---|---|
| 1 | Industrial and Commercial Bank of China | Beijing | Banking, financial services | 175.9 | 45.2 | 4034.5 | 305.1 |
| 2 | JPMorgan Chase | New York City | Banking, financial services | 132.9 | 32.7 | 2737.2 | 368.5 |
| 3 | China Construction Bank | Beijing | Banking, financial services | 150.3 | 38.8 | 3382.4 | 225 |
| 4 | Citigroup | New York City | Banking, financial services | 137.5 | 30.9 | 3293.1 | 197 |
| 5 | Bank of America | Charlotte | Banking, financial services | 111.9 | 28.5 | 2377.2 | 287.3 |
| 6 | Apple Inc. | Cupertino | Consumer Electronics, Software, Services | 261.7 | 59.4 | 373.7 | 961.3 |
| 7 | Ping An Insurance | Shenzhen | Financial services | 151.8 | 16.3 | 1038.3 | 220.2 |
| 8 | American Express | Buffalo | Banking, financial services | 126.7 | 27.5 | 3097.6 | 143 |
| 9 | Royal Dutch Shell | The Hague | Oil and gas | 382.6 | 23.3 | 399.2 | 264.9 |
| 10 | Wells Fargo | San Francisco | Banking, financial services | 101.5 | 23.1 | 1887.8 | 214.7 |

== 2018 list ==
In 2018, the ten largest companies as calculated by this method were:

2018 top ten
| Rank | Company | Headquarters | Industry | Sales (billion $) | Profits (billion $) | Assets (billion $) | Market value (billion $) |
|---|---|---|---|---|---|---|---|
| 1 | Industrial and Commercial Bank of China | Beijing | Banking, financial services | 165.3 | 43.7 | 4210.9 | 311 |
| 2 | China Construction Bank | Beijing | Banking, financial services | 143.2 | 37.1 | 3631.6 | 261.2 |
| 3 | JPMorgan Chase | New York City | Banking, financial services | 118.2 | 26.5 | 2609.8 | 387.7 |
| 4 | Berkshire Hathaway | Omaha | Conglomerate | 235.2 | 39.7 | 702.7 | 491.9 |
| 5 | Citigroup | New York City | Banking, financial services | 129.3 | 29.6 | 3439.3 | 184.1 |
| 6 | Bank of America | Charlotte | Banking, financial services | 92.2 | 16.6 | 2196.8 | 231.9 |
| 7 | Wells Fargo | San Francisco | Banking, financial services | 103.0 | 21.7 | 1915.4 | 265.3 |
| 8 | Apple Inc. | Cupertino | Consumer Electronics, Software, Services | 247.5 | 53.3 | 367.5 | 926.9 |
| 9 | Bank of China | Beijing | Banking, financial services | 118.2 | 26.4 | 3204.2 | 158.6 |
| 10 | American Express | Buffalo | Banking, financial services | 141.6 | 13.9 | 1066.4 | 181.4 |

As a group, the Forbes Global 2000 in year 2018 accounts for $39.1* trillion in sales, $3.2 trillion in profit, $189* trillion in assets and $56.8* trillion in market value.

=== By industry sector ===
The top-ranked companies in each industry sector are as follows.

2018 top company by sector
| Sector | Company | Headquarters | Overall rank | Sales (billion $) | Profits (billion $) | Assets (billion $) | Market value (billion $) |
|---|---|---|---|---|---|---|---|
| Advertising | WPP | London | #301 | 18.7 | 1.8 | 42.4 | 30.1 |
| Aerospace & Defense | Boeing | Chicago | #76 | 96.1 | 5.2 | 94.4 | 85.3 |
| Air Courier | United Parcel Service | Sandy Springs | #146 | 58.1 | 4.8 | 38.3 | 93.3 |
| Airline | Delta Air Lines | Atlanta | #170 | 40.5 | 4.7 | 53.3 | 34.4 |
| Aluminum | Alcoa | New York City | #757 | 21.7 | -0.3 | 36.1 | 13.7 |
| Apparel/Accessories | Christian Dior | Paris | #216 | 41.6 | 1.7 | 68.1 | 31.4 |
| Apparel/Footwear Retail | Inditex | A Coruña | #310 | 23.1 | 3.2 | 18.8 | 103.2 |
| Auto & Truck Manufacturers | Toyota Motor | Toyota | #10 | 235.8 | 19.3 | 406.7 | 177.0 |
| Auto & Truck Parts | Continental | Hanover | #209 | 43.5 | 3.0 | 36.7 | 43.7 |
| Beverages | Anheuser-Busch InBev | Leuven | #56 | 43.6 | 8.3 | 136.5 | 204.6 |
| Biotechs | Gilead Sciences | Foster City | #118 | 32.2 | 18.1 | 51.8 | 138.1 |
| Broadcasting & Cable | Comcast | Philadelphia | #35 | 74.5 | 8.2 | 166.6 | 148.2 |
| Business & Personal Services | Alibaba | Hangzhou | #174 | 15.0 | 11.0 | 56.2 | 200.7 |
| Business Products & Supplies | Canon | Tokyo | #254 | 31.4 | 1.8 | 36.8 | 40.4 |
| Casinos & Gaming | Las Vegas Sands | Paradise | #301 | 11.4 | 1.8 | 21.0 | 37.2 |
| Communications Equipment | Cisco Systems | San Jose | #63 | 49.6 | 10.3 | 112.6 | 141.7 |
| Computer & Electronics Retail | Best Buy | Richfield | #637 | 39.5 | 0.9 | 13.5 | 10.7 |
| Computer Hardware | Apple Inc. | Cupertino | #8 | 233.3 | 53.7 | 293.3 | 586.0 |
| Computer Services | Alphabet | Mountain View | #27 | 77.2 | 17.0 | 149.7 | 500.1 |
| Computer Storage Devices | EMC | Hopkinton | #231 | 24.6 | 2.0 | 45.7 | 51.9 |
| Conglomerates | Siemens | Munich | #51 | 85.5 | 6.5 | 133.9 | 91.8 |
| Construction Materials | Saint-Gobain | Courbevoie | #256 | 43.9 | 1.4 | 48.7 | 25.6 |
| Construction Services | China State Construction Engineering | Beijing | #114 | 135.0 | 4.1 | 165.6 | 25.6 |
| Consumer Electronics | Sony | Tokyo | #192 | 67.9 | 1.1 | 142.2 | 34.1 |
| Consumer Financial Services | American Express | New York City | #95 | 34.6 | 5.0 | 159.0 | 63.2 |
| Containers & Packaging | Amcor | Hawthorn | #966 | 9.3 | 0.7 | 8.2 | 13.6 |
| Department Stores | Macy's | New York City | #515 | 27.1 | 1.1 | 20.6 | 12.8 |
| Discount Stores | Wal-Mart Stores | Bentonville | #15 | 482.1 | 14.7 | 199.6 | 215.7 |
| Diversified Chemicals | BASF | Ludwigshafen | #94 | 78.1 | 4.4 | 80.1 | 73.2 |
| Diversified Insurance | Ping An Insurance | Shenzhen | #20 | 98.7 | 8.7 | 732.3 | 90.0 |
| Diversified Metals & Mining | China Shenhua Energy | Beijing | #167 | 27.3 | 2.6 | 85.3 | 43.1 |
| Diversified Utilities | Veolia Environnement | Paris | #526 | 27.7 | 0.5 | 39.0 | 13.3 |
| Drug Retail | CVS Health | Woonsocket | #62 | 153.3 | 5.2 | 93.7 | 110.8 |
| Electric Utilities | Korea Electric Power | Seoul | #97 | 52.1 | 11.7 | 149.5 | 33.1 |
| Electrical Equipment | Schneider Electric | Rueil-Malmaison | #117 | 29.5 | 1.6 | 46.3 | 39.3 |
| Electronics | Hon Hai Precision (Foxconn) | New Taipei City | #117 | 141.2 | 4.6 | 70.3 | 39.2 |
| Environmental & Waste | Waste Management | Houston | #549 | 13.0 | 0.8 | 20.9 | 25.1 |
| Food Processing | Nestlé | Vevey | #33 | 92.2 | 9.4 | 123.9 | 235.7 |
| Food Retail | Kroger | Cincinnati | #223 | 109.8 | 2.0 | 34.9 | 34.2 |
| Forest Products | Empresas CMPC | Santiago | #1943 | 4.8 | 0.3 | 14.8 | 5.4 |
| Furniture & Fixtures | Steinhoff International | Stellenbosch | #440 | 13.3 | 1.4 | 25.1 | 22.8 |
| Healthcare Services | Express Scripts | St. Louis | #145 | 101.8 | 2.5 | 54.0 | 46.5 |
| Heavy Equipment | Caterpillar | Peoria | #155 | 47.0 | 2.1 | 78.5 | 45.6 |
| Home Improvement Retail | Home Depot | Atlanta | #112 | 88.5 | 7.0 | 42.5 | 169.8 |
| Hotels/Motels | Carnival | Miami | #311 | 15.8 | 1.9 | 38.4 | 37.8 |
| Household Appliances | Midea Group | Foshan | #402 | 22.0 | 2.0 | 19.8 | 20.2 |
| Household/Personal Care | Procter & Gamble | Cincinnati | #39 | 69.4 | 8.4 | 129.1 | 218.9 |
| Insurance Brokers | Aon | London | #420 | 11.7 | 1.4 | 27.2 | 27.9 |
| Internet & Catalog Retail | Amazon | Seattle | #237 | 107.0 | 0.6 | 67.7 | 292.6 |
| Investment Services | Berkshire Hathaway | Omaha | #4 | 210.8 | 24.1 | 561.1 | 360.1 |
| Iron & Steel | Citic Pacific | Hong Kong | #61 | 53.8 | 5.4 | 877.8 | 45.4 |
| Life & Health Insurance | Japan Post Holdings | Tokyo | #29 | 129.8 | 4.4 | 2,450.7 | 62.6 |
| Major Banks | Industrial and Commercial Bank of China | Beijing | #1 | 171.1 | 44.2 | 3,420.3 | 198.0 |
| Managed Health Care | UnitedHealth Group | Minnetonka | #41 | 165.9 | 6.0 | 117.9 | 127.5 |
| Medical Equipment & Supplies | Johnson & Johnson | New Brunswick | #32 | 70.2 | 15.4 | 133.4 | 312.6 |
| Natural Gas Utilities | Gas Natural Fenosa | Barcelona | #287 | 28.8 | 1.7 | 52.3 | 20.6 |
| Oil & Gas Operations | ExxonMobil | Irving | #9 | 236.8 | 16.2 | 336.8 | 363.3 |
| Oil Services & Equipment | Schlumberger | Houston | #176 | 31.7 | 1.6 | 69.1 | 111.1 |
| Other Industrial Equipment | Eaton | Dublin | #315 | 20.9 | 2.0 | 31.0 | 28.9 |
| Other Transportation | Møller-Maersk | Copenhagen | #306 | 40.3 | 0.7 | 64.1 | 30.7 |
| Paper & Paper Products | International Paper | Memphis | #426 | 22.4 | 0.9 | 30.6 | 17.8 |
| Pharmaceuticals | Pfizer | New York City | #46 | 48.9 | 7.7 | 167.5 | 205.7 |
| Precision Healthcare Equipment | Thermo Fisher Scientific | Waltham | #267 | 17.0 | 2.0 | 40.9 | 57.8 |
| Printing & Publishing | Thomson Reuters | New York City | #405 | 12.2 | 1.3 | 29.1 | 30.9 |
| Property & Casualty Insurance | Travelers | New York City | #165 | 26.9 | 3.4 | 102.0 | 32.4 |
| Railroads | Union Pacific | Omaha | #172 | 21.0 | 4.6 | 55.8 | 75.4 |
| Real Estate | Vanke | Shenzhen | #185 | 31.1 | 2.9 | 94.1 | 27.7 |
| Recreational Products | Activision Blizzard | Santa Monica | #842 | 4.6 | 0.9 | 15.3 | 25.5 |
| Regional Banks | China Construction Bank | Beijing | #2 | 146.8 | 36.4 | 2,826.0 | 162.8 |
| Rental & Leasing | Mitsubishi UFJ Lease | Tokyo | #1075 | 6.7 | 0.5 | 42.3 | 4.2 |
| Restaurants | McDonald's | Oak Brook | #189 | 25.4 | 4.8 | 37.9 | 110.1 |
| Security Systems | Secom | Tokyo | #854 | 7.1 | 0.6 | 13.2 | 18.1 |
| Semiconductors | Samsung Electronics | Seoul | #18 | 177.3 | 16.5 | 206.5 | 161.6 |
| Software & Programming | Microsoft | Redmond | #23 | 86.6 | 10.2 | 181.9 | 407.0 |
| Specialized Chemicals | Air Liquide | Paris | #313 | 18.2 | 1.9 | 31.4 | 40.5 |
| Specialty Stores | Richemont | Bellevue | #416 | 12.4 | 1.7 | 21.2 | 37.6 |
| Telecommunications services | AT&T | Dallas | #12 | 146.8 | 13.2 | 402.7 | 234.2 |
| Thrifts & Mortgage Financing | Aareal Bank | Wiesbaden | #1381 | 1.4 | 0.4 | 57.2 | 2.1 |
| Tobacco | British American Tobacco | London | #177 | 20.0 | 6.6 | 46.5 | 111.0 |
| Trading Companies | Mitsubishi Corp | Tokyo | #136 | 59.8 | 2.7 | 135.7 | 27.7 |
| Trucking | Yamato Holdings | Tokyo | #1306 | 11.7 | 0.3 | 9.3 | 8.6 |

== 2017 list ==
In 2017, the ten largest companies as calculated by this method were:

2017 top ten
| Rank | Company | Headquarters | Industry | Sales (billion $) | Profits (billion $) | Assets (billion $) | Market value (billion $) |
|---|---|---|---|---|---|---|---|
| 1 | Industrial and Commercial Bank of China | Beijing | Banking, financial services | 151.4 | 42.0 | 3473.2 | 229.8 |
| 2 | China Construction Bank | Beijing | Banking, financial services | 134.2 | 35.0 | 3016.6 | 200.5 |
| 3 | Berkshire Hathaway | Omaha | Conglomerate | 222.9 | 24.1 | 620.9 | 409.9 |
| 4 | JPMorgan Chase | New York City | Banking, financial services | 102.5 | 24.2 | 2513.0 | 306.6 |
| 5 | Wells Fargo | San Francisco | Banking, financial services | 97.6 | 21.9 | 1943.4 | 274.4 |
| 6 | Citigroup | New York City | Banking, financial services | 115.7 | 27.8 | 2816.0 | 149.2 |
| 7 | Bank of America | Charlotte | Banking, financial services | 92.2 | 16.6 | 2196.8 | 231.9 |
| 8 | Bank of China | Beijing | Banking, financial services | 113.1 | 24.9 | 2611.5 | 141.3 |
| 9 | Apple Inc. | Cupertino | Consumer Electronics, Software, Services | 217.5 | 45.2 | 331.1 | 752.0 |
| 10 | Toyota Motor | Toyota | Automotive | 249.9 | 17.1 | 412.5 | 171.9 |

== 2016 list ==
In 2016, the ten largest companies as calculated by this method were:

2016 top ten
| Rank | Company | Headquarters | Industry | Sales (billion $) | Profits (billion $) | Assets (billion $) | Market value (billion $) |
|---|---|---|---|---|---|---|---|
| 1 | Industrial and Commercial Bank of China | Beijing | Banking, financial services | 171.1 | 44.2 | 3,420.2 | 198 |
| 2 | China Construction Bank | Beijing | Banking, financial services | 146.8 | 36.4 | 2,826 | 162.8 |
| 3 | Citigroup | New York City | Banking, financial services | 131.9 | 28.8 | 2,739.8 | 152.7 |
| 4 | Berkshire Hathaway | Omaha | Conglomerate | 210.8 | 24.1 | 561.1 | 360.1 |
| 5 | JPMorgan Chase | New York City | Banking, financial services | 99.9 | 23.5 | 2,423.8 | 234.2 |
| 6 | Bank of China | Beijing | Banking, financial services | 122 | 27.2 | 2,589.6 | 143 |
| 7 | Wells Fargo | San Francisco | Banking, financial services | 91.4 | 22.7 | 1,849.2 | 256 |
| 8 | Apple Inc. | Cupertino | Consumer Electronics, Software, Services | 233.3 | 53.7 | 293.3 | 586 |
| 9 | ExxonMobil | Irving | Oil and gas | 236.8 | 16.2 | 336.8 | 363.3 |
| 10 | Toyota Motor | Toyota | Automotive | 235.8 | 19.3 | 406.7 | 177 |

== See also ==
- Forbes 500
- Fortune Global 500
- Fortune India 500
- Financial Times Global 500
- Bentley Infrastructure 500
- List of largest employers
- List of largest companies by revenue
- List of public corporations by market capitalization
- List of largest Nordic companies
- Most Valuable Nation Brands List
