= Melker Schörling =

Swedish billionaire businessman (1947–2023)

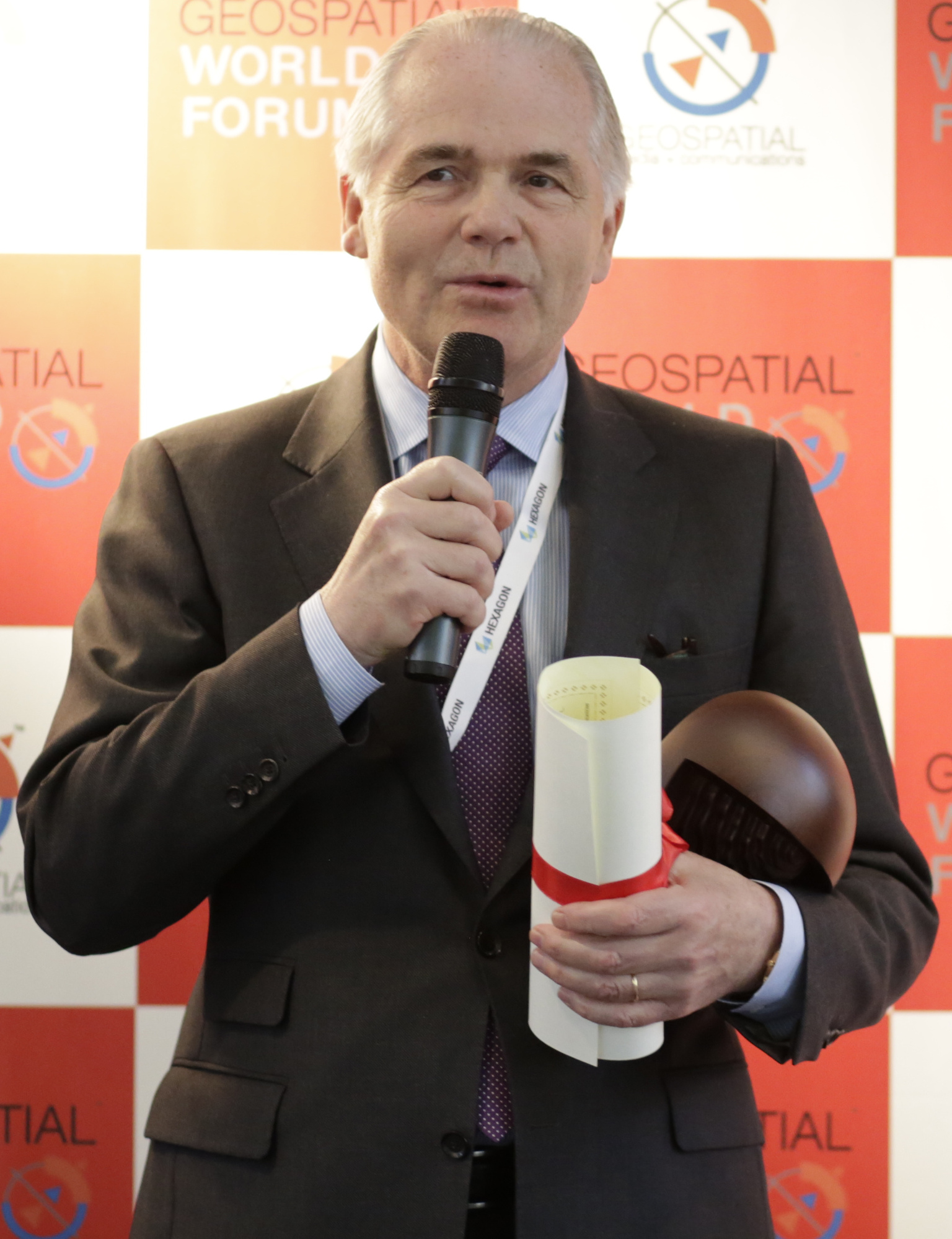
- Schörling in 2013
- Born: 15 May 1947
- Died: 10 December 2023 (aged 76); Nyköping, Sweden
- Education: Gothenburg School of Business, Economics and Law
- Known for: Founder, Melker Schorling AB
- Spouse: Kerstin Schörling
- Children: 2

Melker Schörling (15 May 1947 – 10 December 2023) was a Swedish billionaire businessman. His investment company Melker Schörling AB (MSAB) had large interests in Securitas AB, Assa Abloy, Hexagon AB, Loomis and more. Schörling formed a partnership with fellow billionaire Gustaf Douglas, who was also a major shareholder in Securitas and Assa Abloy.

== Early life ==
Melker Schörling was a graduate of the Gothenburg School of Business, Economics and Law.

== Career ==
Schörling made a name for himself as the CEO of Securitas in 1987 before moving on to Skanska, when Percy Barnevik was chair. Schörling later left his executive career to focus on his investments.

In August 2006, Schörling revealed that he would take MSAB public, listing it on the Stockholm Stock Exchange. He also unveiled a new board of directors. The new board, one of the most high-profile in the Swedish business world, includes Stefan Persson, Carl-Henric Svanberg, and Schörling's daughter.

In 2017, Schörling left all positions in the company, citing health reasons. He has since been replaced by his daughters Sophia and Märta.

As of May 2021, he was worth US$12.5 billion according to Bloomberg Billionaires Index.

== Personal life and death ==
Schörling was married, with two children, and lived in Stockholm.

Schörling died in Nyköping on 10 December 2023, at the age of 76.
