= Financial Times Global 500 =

Annual statistics publisher

The FT Global 500 is an annual snapshot of the world's largest companies to show how corporate fortunes have changed in the past year, highlighting the relative performance of countries and sectors. The list is published by the Financial Times. The companies are ranked by market capitalization. The greater the stock market value of a company, the higher its ranking. Market cap is the share price multiplied by the number of shares issued.

For each company, the main Global 500 table shows the rank in that year and the year before, the country, market capitalization, sector, turnover, net income, total assets and employees. The price, price earnings ratio, dividend yield and the company's year-end are included in the Global 500 on FT.com.

== See also ==
- Fortune Global 500
- 40 under 40 (Fortune magazine)
- Fortune 1000
- Forbes Global 2000
- Bentley Infrastructure 500
- List of largest companies by revenue
- List of corporations by market capitalization
