= Luciad =

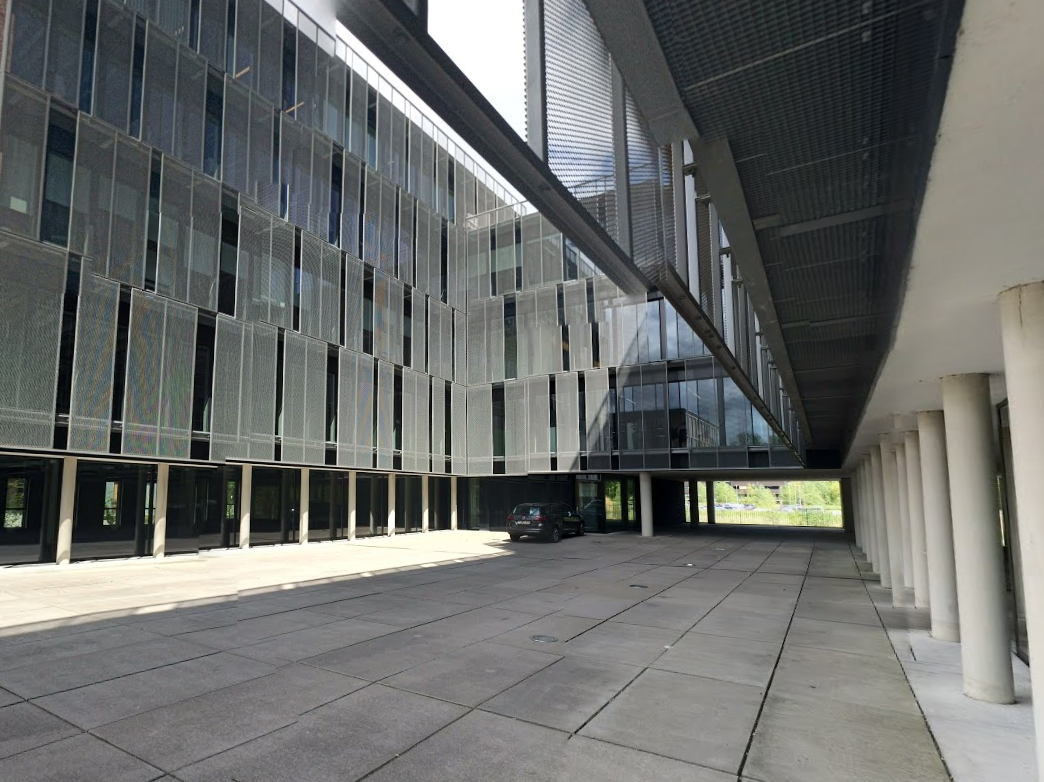
- Luciad's headquarters at the Arenberg Research-Park in Leuven, Belgium
- Company type: Public – NV
- Industry: Aviation; Defense; Security; Software; Geographic Information Systems (GIS)
- Founded: 1999 in Holsbeek, Belgium
- Founder: Dr. Lode Missiaen
- Headquarters: Leuven, Belgium
- Area served: Worldwide
- Key people: COO: Frank Suykens; CIO: Gunther Sablon
- Website: www.hexagongeospatial.com

Luciad is a supplier of geographic information system (GIS) tools. Their products are intended for geospatial situational awareness. The company mainly focuses on the aviation, defence and security markets. Defence customers account for about 70% of the company's business.

Headquartered in Leuven, Belgium, Luciad has offices in the United States, France, Germany, Mexico, and other international locations. It has supplied software to aviation and defense organizations, including Eurocontrol and Airbus Defence and Space.

== History ==
Dr. Lode Missiaen along with his colleague, Thierry Salvant, founded Luciad on March 22, 1999, together with management company R2I (acted as business angels). Gemma Frisius Fund (GFF), a seed capital fund established in 1997 as a joint venture between the KU Leuven, KBC and BNP Paribas, provided further seed capital in September 2000.

Beginning in 2008, Luciad technology has been used to support SACT's objectives of improving interoperability between NATO and national C4I systems. Luciad has also been contracted by the NATO C3 Agency to deliver the software components for the visualization capability in its interim Joint Common Operational Picture. In 2016, Luciad announced a partnership with Sc2 Corp and IBM to develop social media analytics for US Special Operations Command.

Luciad has participated with Frontex, the European Organisation for Security (EOS) and the Aerospace and Defence Industries Association of Europe (ASD) on border security and border control.

Luciad is one of several spin-offs of the KU Leuven.

Missiaen served as Group CEO from 1999 to 2012. Investment company Gimv acquired a majority stake in Luciad in 2013. In October 2017, Gimv and the other shareholders sold their stake in Luciad to the Swedish-headquartered Hexagon, which rendered Luciad a fully owned Hexagon subsidiary under their Geospatial division.

== Operations and Productions ==
In October 2017, the Swedish company Hexagon AB bought Luciad, turning it into a fully owned part of their Geospatial division. At that time, Luciad had over 100 employees across eight countries and more than 100,000 users worldwide.

After the acquisition, Luciad continued to develop its geospatial software, with a focus on real-time visuals, situational awareness, and tools for defense and intelligence. The company continued to be active in aviation, defense and security markets, serving both governments and businesses.

In 2025, Hexagon launched Luciad 2025.0, an update featuring enhanced real-time visualization, strengthened support for defense formats such as NITF, and improved tools for on-the-ground operations. It shows ongoing evolution to fit what defense, intelligence, and other geospatial users need.

Luciad makes a range of geospatial software products designed for different platforms and needs. Their lineup includes LuciadFusion for managing geospatial data on servers, LuciadLightspeed for desktop analysis, LuciadRIA for web-based situational awareness, and LuciadCPillar as an API for developers building custom applications.

The software provides tools for real-time visuals, data integration, and analysis for both static and dynamic geospatial data. These capabilities are applied in sectors such as defense, aviation, and security markets, where quick awareness and smooth data sharing are critical.

Luciad's tech also pops up outside defense and aviation applications; it has been used in commercial and civil areas like smart city planning, infrastructure monitoring, digital twin development, mining, and transportation analytics. It shows how flexible the platform really is for all sorts of geospatial jobs.

== Awards ==
In 2016, Luciad received the Geospatial World Innovation Award for LuciadRIA, a 3D web-based application.

== Luciad User Conference ==
Luciad hosts an annual User Conference in Brussels for geospatial professionals.
