= Economic taxonomy =

Classifying economic activities

An economic taxonomy is a system of classification of economic activity, including products, companies and industries. Some economists believe that the study of economic policy demands the use of a taxonomic/classificatory approach.

== Industry taxonomies ==
Industry taxonomies include international, regional and national taxonomies and proprietary taxonomies.

=== Official statistics taxonomies ===
The international and national taxonomies are used by official statistical agencies.

United Nations provide its International Standard Industrial Classification (ISIC) as a base for establishing regional taxonomies:

- North America North American Industry Classification System (NAICS)
  - United States Standard Industrial Classification (SIC)
- Europe Statistical classification of economic activities in the European Community (NACE)
  - United Kingdom Standard Industrial Classification of Economic Activities
  - Russian Economic Activities Classification System (OKVED)

=== Proprietary taxonomies ===
The proprietary taxonomies are often used in the financial services industry to group similar investment vehicles and to construct sectorial stock market indices.

Proprietary taxonomies include the Global Industry Classification Standard (GICS), the Industry Classification Benchmark (ICB) and The Refinitiv Business Classification (TRBC).

Pavitt's Taxonomy classifies firms by their principal sources of innovation.

MasterFormat provides a taxonomy for organizing construction projects with the primary unit of differentiation consisting of a binary fail/no-fail tag. The majority of the users of MasterFormat fall into the first category.

== Product taxonomy ==
Product classification or product taxonomy organizes products for a variety of purposes.

== Other taxonomies ==
Other taxonomies include classifications of trademarks, jobs (occupations), patents, publications in the field of economy, standards, customs classification.

== See also ==
- Taxonomy (general)
- Taxonomy (biology)
- Military taxonomy
