= Industry classification =

Taxonomy of companies by market or product

Industry classification or industry taxonomy is a type of economic taxonomy that classifies companies, organizations and traders into industrial groupings based on similar production processes, similar products, or similar behavior in financial markets.

National and international statistical agencies use various industry-classification schemes to summarize economic conditions. Securities analysts use such groupings to track common forces acting on groups of companies, to compare companies' performance to that of their peers, and to construct either specialized or diversified portfolios.

== Sectors and industries ==
Economic activities can be classified in a variety of ways. At the top level, they are often classified according to the three-sector theory into sectors: primary (extraction and agriculture), secondary (manufacturing), and tertiary (services). Some authors add quaternary (knowledge) or even quinary (culture and research) sectors. Over time, the fraction of a society's activities within each sector changes.

Below the economic sectors are more detailed classifications. They commonly divide economic activities into industries according to similar functions and markets and identify businesses producing related products.

Industries can also be identified by product, such as: construction industry, chemical industry, petroleum industry, automotive industry, electronic industry, power engineering and power manufacturing (such as gas or wind turbines), meatpacking industry, hospitality industry, food industry, fish industry, software industry, paper industry, entertainment industry, semiconductor industry, cultural industry, and poverty industry.

Market-based classification systems such as the Global Industry Classification Standard (GICS), the Industry Classification Benchmark (ICB) and The Refinitiv Business Classification (TRBC) are used in finance and market research.

== List of classifications ==
A wide variety of taxonomies is in use, sponsored by different organizations and based on different criteria.

Abbreviation	Full name	Sponsor	Criterion/ unit	Node count by level	Issued
ANZSIC	Australian and New Zealand Standard Industrial Classification	Governments of Australia and New Zealand			1993, 2006
BICS	Bloomberg Industry Classification Standard	Bloomberg L.P.		10/.../2294	
GICS	Global Industry Classification Standard	Standard & Poor's, MSCI	market/ company	2-8 digits 11/24/69/158	1999–present (2018)
HSICS	Hang Seng Industry Classification System	Hang Seng Indexes Company	Revenue source	11/31/89	
IBBICS	Industry Building Blocks	Industry Building Blocks	Market line of business	19/130/550/3000/20200	2002
ICB	Industry Classification Benchmark	FTSE	market/ company	11/20/45/173	2005–present (2019)
ISIC	International Standard Industrial Classification of All Economic Activities	United Nations Statistics Division	production/ establishment	4 digits 21/88/238/419	1948–present (Rev. 4, 2008)
MGECS	Morningstar Global Equity Classification System	Morningstar, Inc.	Securities behavior	3/14/69/148	
NACE	Statistical Classification of Economic Activities in the European Community	European Union	production/ establishment	6 digits	1970, 1990, 2006
NAICS	North American Industry Classification System	Governments of the United States, Canada, and Mexico	production/ establishment	6 digits 17/99/313/724/1175 (/19745)^{1}	1997, 2002, 2012, 2017, 2022
RBICS	FactSet Revere Business Industry Classification System	FactSet, acquired in 2013	line of business	11000	
SIC	Standard Industrial Classification	Government of the United States	production/ establishment	4 digits 1004 categories	1937–1987 (superseded by NAICS, but still used in some applications)
SNI	Swedish Standard Industrial Classification	Government of Sweden			
SSIC	Singapore Standard Industrial Classification	Singapore Department of Statistics	Economic activity / economic unit	5 digits	2025
TRBC	The Refinitiv Business Classification	Refinitiv	market/ company	10 digits 13/33/62/154/898	2004, 2008, 2012, 2020
UKSIC	United Kingdom Standard Industrial Classification of Economic Activities	Government of the United Kingdom			1948–present (2007)
UNSPSC	United Nations Standard Products and Services Code	United Nations	Product	8 digits (optional 9th) (four levels)	1998–present

== See also ==
- Economic sector
- Economic industry
- Product classification
