= Industry (economics) =

Economic branch that produces raw materials, goods or services

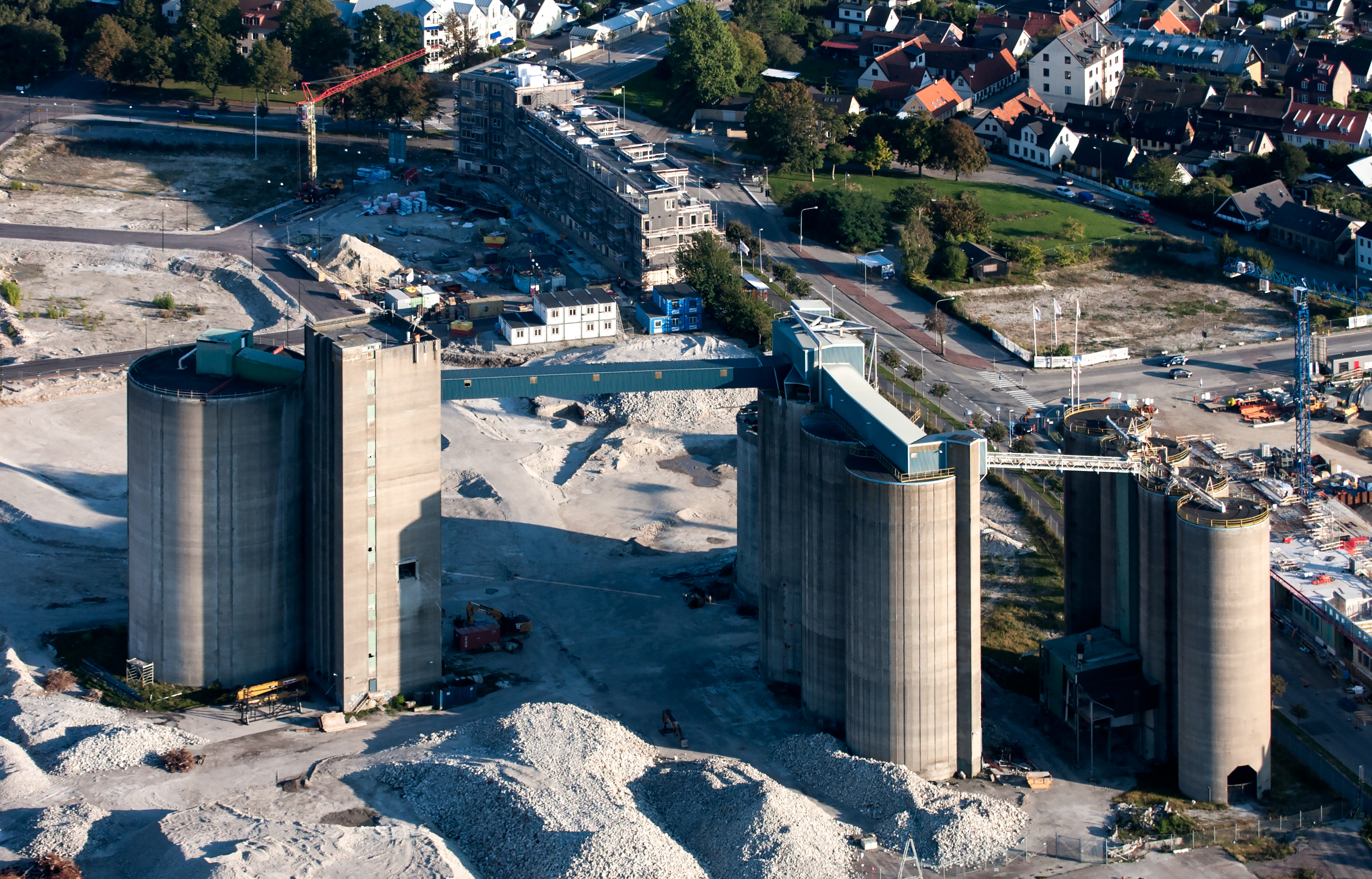
Cement factories, part of the manufacturing industry, produce product for the construction industry (also known as the building industry). This factory was in Malmö, Sweden.

Burj al Arab as a symbol for the hospitality industry

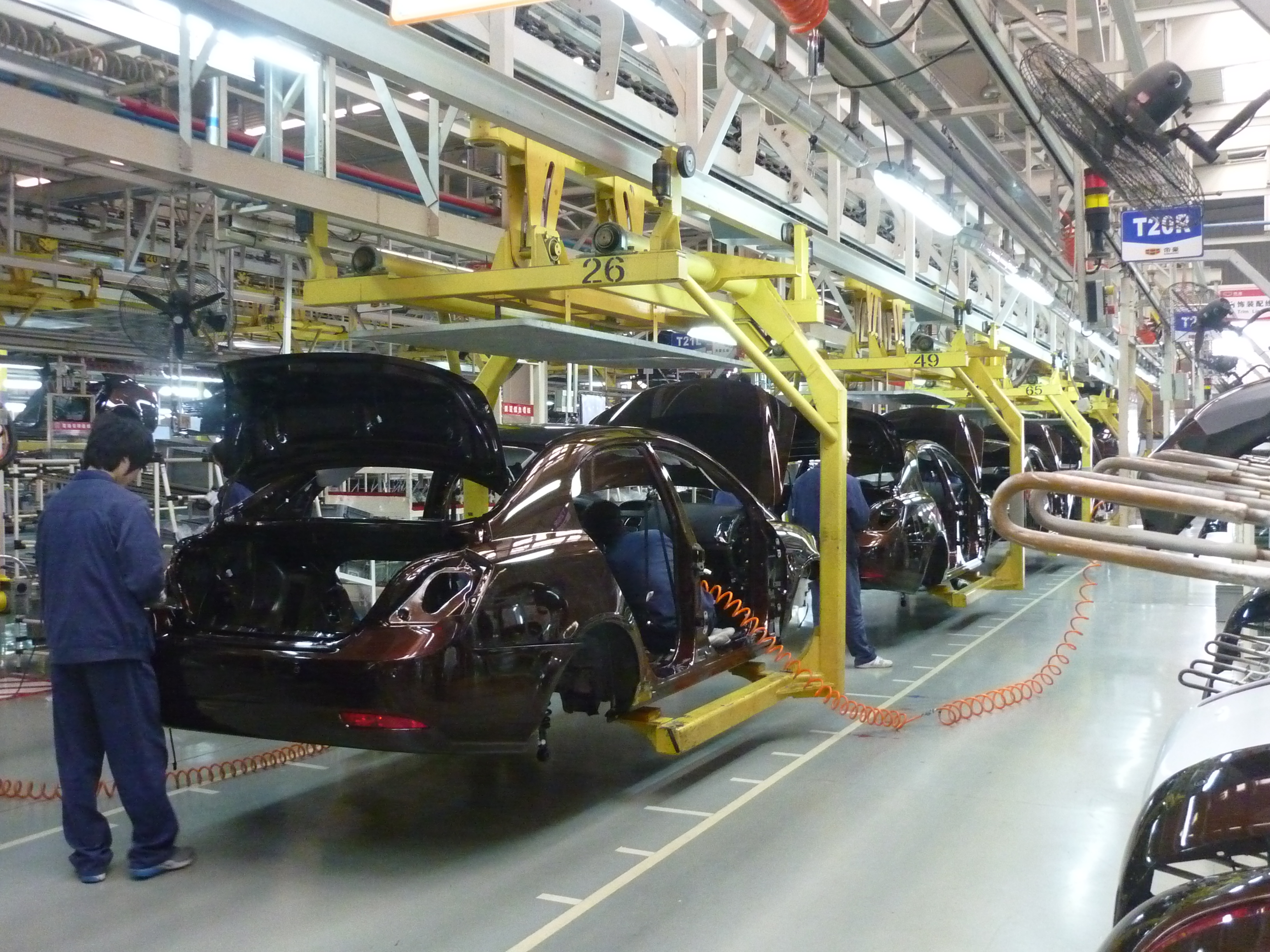
An image of the motor industry (automotive industry), a supplier to the transport industry. Economists may regard the manufacture of vehicles as a foundational industry and as a bellwether industry.

In microeconomics, an industry is a branch of an economy that produces a closely related set of raw materials, goods, or services. For example, one might refer to the wood industry or to the insurance industry.

When evaluating a single group or company, its dominant source of revenue is typically used by industry classifications to classify it within a specific industry. For example the International Standard Industrial Classification (ISIC) – used directly or through derived classifications for the official statistics of most countries worldwide – classifies "statistical units" by the "economic activity in which they mainly engage". Industry is then defined as "set of statistical units that are classified into the same ISIC category". However, a single business need not belong just to one industry, such as when a large business (often referred to as a conglomerate) diversifies across separate industries.

Other industry classification systems include the North American Industry Classification System (NAICS), which was developed through partnerships with North American countries such as the United States, Canada, and Mexico, in order to standardize the comparison of business activities in North America, the Global Industry Classification Standard (GICS), which is used to assign companies to specific economic sectors and industry groups, and the NACE classification used in the European Union.

There are many industry classifications in the modern economy, which can be grouped into larger categories called economic sectors. Sectors are broader than industry classifications. For example, the retail trade sector contains industries such as clothing stores, shoe stores, and health and personal care stores. Companies are not limited to one sector or industry. They can reside in multiple sectors and industries.

Industries, though associated with specific products, processes, and consumer markets, can evolve over time. One distinct industry (for example, barrelmaking) may become limited to a tiny niche market and get mostly re-classified into another industry using new techniques. At the same time, entirely new industries may branch off from older ones once a significant market becomes apparent (as an example, the semiconductor industry has become distinguished from the wider electronics industry).

Industry classification is valuable for economic analysis because it leads to largely distinct categories with simple relationships. Through these classifications, economists are able to compare companies within the same industry to evaluate the attractiveness of that industry. Companies within the same industry can also have similar movements in the unit value of their listed shares due to their similarity and macroeconomic factors that affect all members of an industry. However, more complex cases, such as otherwise different processes yielding similar products, require an element of standardization and prevent any one schema from fitting all possible uses.

== See also ==
- Outline of industry
- List of countries by GDP sector composition
