= Tertiary sector =

Service sector

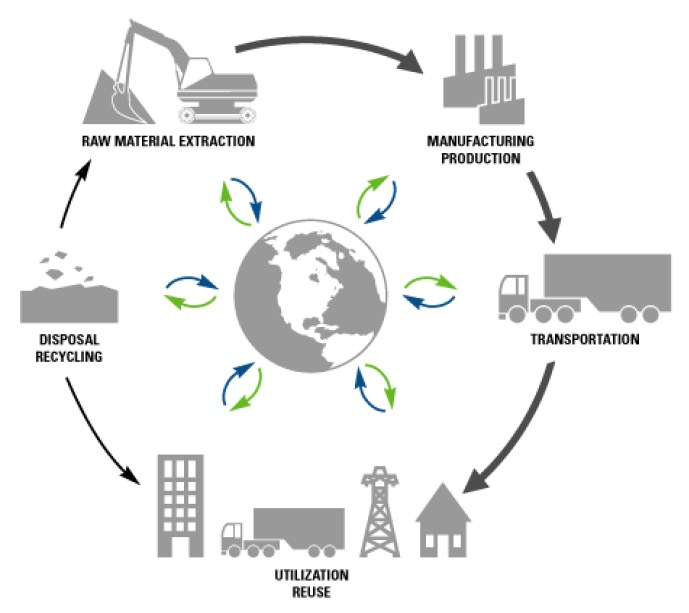
The product lifecycle

In economics, the tertiary sector (also known as the service sector) is the economic sector which comprises the provision of services as opposed to the manufacture of finished goods. Services (also known as "intangible goods") include attention, advice, access, experience and affective labour.

The tertiary sector involves the provision of services to other businesses as well as to final consumers. Services may involve the transport, distribution and sale of goods from a producer to a consumer, as may happen in wholesaling and retailing, pest control or financial services. The goods may be transformed in the process of providing the service, as happens in the restaurant industry. However, the focus is on people by interacting with them and serving the customers rather than transforming the physical goods. The production of information has been long regarded as a service, but some economists now attribute it to a fourth sector, called the quaternary sector.

== Difficulty of definition ==
It is sometimes hard to determine whether a given company is part of the secondary or the tertiary sector. It is not only for-profit companies that make up the sector in some schemes, but also governments and government agencies (such as the police or military) and nonprofit organizations (such as charities or research associations) that provide services.

To classify a business as a service, one can use a classification system such as the United Nations' International Standard Industrial Classification, the North American Industrial Classification System (NAICS), the Statistical Classification of Economic Activities in the European Community (NACE) or similar systems elsewhere. These governmental classification systems have a first level of hierarchy that reflects whether the economic goods are tangible or intangible.

For purposes of finance and market research, market-based classification systems such as the Global Industry Classification Standard and the Industry Classification Benchmark are used to classify businesses that participate in the service sector. Unlike governmental classification systems, the first level of market-based classification systems divides the economy into functionally related markets or industries. The second or third level of these hierarchies then reflects whether goods or services are produced.

== Theory of progression ==
For the last 100 years, there has been a substantial shift from the primary and secondary sectors to the tertiary sector in industrialized countries. This shift is called tertiarisation. The tertiary sector is now the largest sector of the economy in the Western world, and is also the fastest-growing sector. In examining the growth of the service sector in the early nineties, the globalist Kenichi Ohmae noted that:

In the United States, 70 per cent of the workforce works in the service sector; in Japan, 60 per cent, and in Taiwan, 50 per cent. These are not necessarily busboys and live-in maids. Numerous of them are in the skilled category. They are earning as much as manufacturing employees, and often more.

Economies tend to follow a developmental progression that takes them from heavy reliance on agriculture and mining, toward the development of manufacturing (e.g. automobiles, textiles, shipbuilding, steel) and finally toward a more service-based structure. The first economy to follow this path in the modern world was the United Kingdom. The speed at which other economies have made the transition to service-based (or "post-industrial") economies has increased over time.

Historically, manufacturing tended to be more open to international trade and competition than services. However, with dramatic cost reduction and speed and reliability improvements in the transportation of people and the communication of information, the service sector now includes some of the most intensive international competition, despite residual protectionism.

== Issues for service providers ==
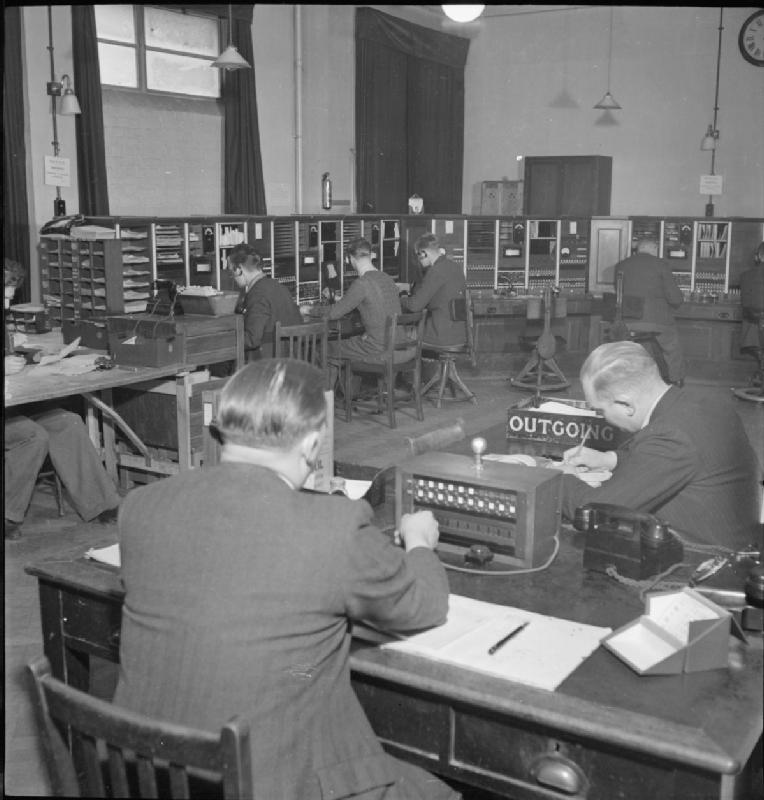
Testing telephone lines in London in 1945

Service providers face obstacles selling services that goods-sellers rarely face. Services are intangible, making it difficult for potential customers to understand what they will receive and what value it will hold for them. Indeed, some, such as consultants and providers of investment services, offer no guarantees of the value for the price paid.

Since the quality of most services depends largely on the quality of the individuals providing the services, "people costs" are usually a high fraction of service costs. Whereas a manufacturer may use technology, simplification, and other techniques to lower the cost of goods sold, the service provider often faces an unrelenting pattern of increasing costs.

Product differentiation is often difficult. For example, how does one choose one investment adviser over another, since they are often seen to provide identical services. Charging a premium for services is usually an option only for the most established firms, who charge extra based upon brand recognition.

== List of countries by tertiary output ==
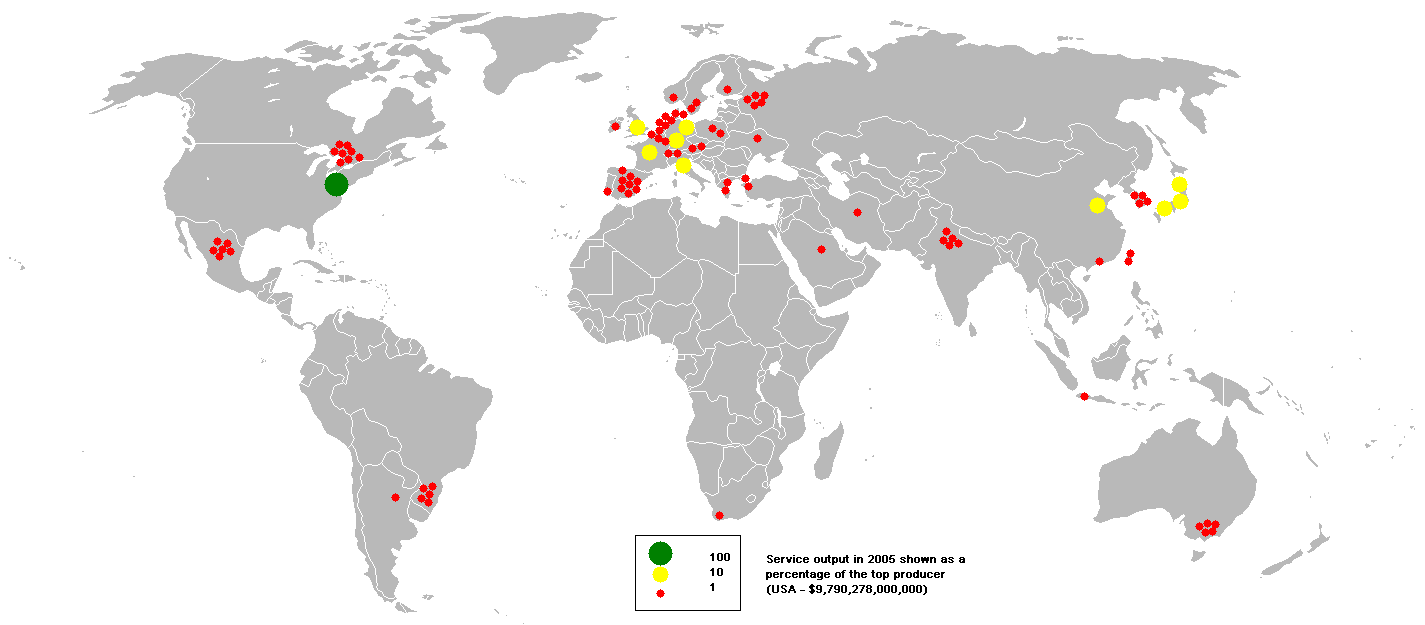
Service output as a percentage of the top producer (United States) as of 2005

== See also ==
- Economic sector
- Indigo Era
- Outline of consulting
- Post-industrial society
- Quaternary sector of the economy
- Voluntary sector
