= Service 4.0 =

Service 4.0 is a collective term for technologies and concepts of service and support function organizations, based on new disruptive technological concepts (big data, mobility), the Internet of Things and the Internet of Services. It is a similar concept to industry 4.0, applied to value chain. The proponents of Service 4.0 claim that it is a major opportunity for service companies to make a leap forward in terms of efficiency and effectiveness, and an opportunity for service users to discover and benefit from new features, impossible to be delivered before this disruption.

Even when there is not much literature about Service 4.0, entities in Germany, Australia, Singapore, and Mexico are working on developing the concept, with different perspectives: Germany is focusing on technical and post-sale service, to support manufacturing operations, a point of view aligned with their traditional high quality culture, and excellence-in-manufacturing tradition. Australian authors are focusing on government, arguing that official services must not be government-oriented, but service-oriented. Singapore sees Service 4.0 as the evolution of services, offering what they call seamless service, in the use and delivery of cloud based high technology services.

== Definition of service ==
In economics, a service is an intangible commodity, an economic activity where the buyer does not generally, except by exclusive contract, obtain exclusive ownership of the thing purchased.

According to the North American Standard Industry Classification System and the International Standard Industrial Classification of All Economic Activities there are two major sectors in the economy: the goods-producing sector and the service-producing sector. The goods-producing sector includes agriculture, forestry, and fishing; mining; construction; and manufacturing. The service-producing sector includes the divisions of (1) transportation, communications, and utilities; (2) wholesale trade; (3) retail trade; (4) finance, insurance, and real estate; (5) public administration; and (6) services. This sixth group—the services division—includes a number of industries.

Lalo Duron, PhD, Mexican author, stated the foundations in his book Alive & Well!, where he proposed the COS Model, a pragmatic management model to earn and keep customers' loyalty, using three strategies: Impeccable offer, integrated marketing communications, and a customer centricity. Talking about impeccable service, he said "an impeccable offer is the most important element to have a satisfied, loyal customer. When a company designs the service to achieve or exceed what its customers expect, customer retention is the highest probability result".

Mexican Service 4.0 thinkers like Rodrigo Fernández and Yami Almaguer see it as a customer experience enabler: as an organization promises to fulfill or exceed customers' expectations, the service blueprint is a simple tool to accomplish it.

== The service blueprint ==
In 2008, Bitner, Ostrom and Morgan departed from the idea that services are processes designed to deliver customer experiences, and to control their output they proposed the Service Blueprint, a visual tool to design the services and compare the desired service against the actual delivery, and make the necessary adjustments to design the moments of truth (as proposed by Carlzon) and assure quality.

The service blueprint has five components, all subject to a timeline, so all the organization needs to deliver impeccable service is taken into consideration:

1. Customer actions
2. Onstage, visible contact employee or device actions
3. Backstage, invisible contact employee or device actions
4. Support processes
5. Physical evidence

The service blueprint is a method to address the challenges organizations face to design and deliver top class services to exceed customers' expectations.
