= SNI =

SNI may refer to:

== Science and technology ==
- Substitution nucleophilic internal, a chemistry reaction mechanism
- Swedish Standard Industrial Classification, a Swedish economic classification system
- Server Name Indication, an extension to the TLS computer networking protocol

== Companies ==
- Scripps Networks Interactive, a media company
- Showtime Networks Inc., an American cable network company
- Siemens Nixdorf Informationssysteme, a former computer hardware company
- Société Nationale d'Investissement, a Moroccan conglomerate
- Sports Network Incorporated, a former American media company

== Organizations ==
- National Information Service (Brazil), or Serviço Nacional de Informações, the former name of the Brazilian Intelligence Agency
- Seicho-no-Ie, a Japanese new religion
- Shelter Now International, a Christian foreign aid organization, based in Germany and historically focused on Pakistan and Afghanistan
- Sistema Nacional de Investigadores, a Mexican government agency
- Soviet Naval Infantry
- Swiss Nanoscience Institute

== Other uses ==
- Standar Nasional Indonesia (Indonesian National Standard), formulated by the National Standardization Agency
