= Safety taxonomy =

A safety taxonomy is a standardized set of terminologies used within the fields of safety and health care. The goal is to foster clear communication, as the terminology used within these fields can be immensely confusing, even to specialists.

The creation of effective taxonomies is of great importance. For example, there exist numerous taxonomies to classify and analyze human error and accident causes. Examples of these include the Human Factors Analysis and Classification System based on Reason's Swiss Cheese Model, the Cognitive Reliability and Error Analysis Method (CREAM), the taxonomy used by the Confidential Incident Reporting & Analysis System (CIRAS) in the UK rail industry, and others.

== See also ==
- Biological taxonomy
- Economic taxonomy
- Military taxonomy
- Safety science
