= Swedish Standard Industrial Classification =

The Swedish Standard Industrial Classification, commonly referred to as SNI, is a Swedish industry standard economic classification system, consisting of a hierarchy of codes that are up to 6-digits long.

The SNI standard is modeled on the Statistical Classification of Economic Activities in the European Community, commonly referred to as NACE. The most recent version of the SNI standard is SNI 2007, which corresponds to NACE Revision 2. The SNI standard is maintained by Statistics Sweden (also known as SCB), a Swedish government office.
