= United Kingdom Standard Industrial Classification of Economic Activities =

Industry classification

The United Kingdom Standard Industrial Classification of Economic Activities (UKSIC) is a Standard Industrial Classification that is intended to help classify businesses according to the type of their economic activity. One or more SIC codes can be attributed to a business. SIC codes identify what a business does.

Over time there have been several different SIC systems used in the UK, with versions published in 1958, 1968, 1980, 1992, 1997, 2003 and 2007. These taxonomies have been adapted to cope with the changes in UK industry, The 1980 system was far more detailed in manufacturing, while the 2007 system is much stronger in the IT sector. Many companies still use the 2003 codes which were the 1992 system updated slightly. However, the very latest version is the 2007 SIC system

== History ==
A Standard Industrial Classification (SIC) was first introduced into the United Kingdom in 1948 for use in classifying business establishments and other statistical units by the type of economic activity in which they are engaged. The classification provides a framework for the collection, tabulation, presentation and analysis of data and its use promotes uniformity. In addition, it can be used for administration purposes and by non-government bodies as a convenient way of classifying industrial activities into a common structure.

== Current 2007 SIC codes ==
These now fall in line with the European Union industrial classification system, NACE, and the United Nations International Standard Industrial Classifications, ISIC, to and including the 4 digit class level. For certain classes in the UK SIC 2007 taxonomy a further breakdown to a 5 digit level is available. They have been revised mostly to cater for the greater importance of service activities over the last fifteen years, due to developments in technology, such as information technology and information and communications technology.

Main Sections

A) Agriculture, Forestry and Fishing
B) Mining and quarrying
C) Manufacturing
D) Electricity, Gas, Steam and air conditioning
E) Water supply, sewerage, waste management and remediation activities
F) Construction
G) Wholesale and retail trade; repair of motor vehicles and motorcycles
H) Transport and storage
I) Accommodation and food service activities
J) Information and communication
K) Financial and insurance activities
L) Real estate activities
M) Professional, scientific and technical activities
N) Administrative and support service activities
O) Public administration and defence; compulsory social security
P) Education
Q) Human health and social work activities
R) Arts, entertainment and recreation
S) Other service activities
T) Activities of households as employers, undifferentiated goods and service producing activities of households for own use
U) Activities of extraterritorial organisations and bodies

== See also ==
- Industry Classification Benchmark, a similar list from FTSE
