= Scientific classification (disambiguation) =

Scientific classification is a practice and science of categorization.

Scientific classification may also refer to:

- Chemical classification
- Mathematical classification, construction of subsets into a set
- Statistical classification, the mathematical problem of assigning a label to an object based on a set of its attributes or features

== Biology ==
- Taxonomy (biology)
  - Alpha taxonomy, the science of finding, describing and naming organisms
  - Cladistics, a newer way of classifying organisms, based solely on phylogeny
  - Linnaean taxonomy, the classic scientific classification system
  - Virus classification, naming and sorting viruses

== Astronomy ==
- Galaxy morphological classification
- Stellar classification

== See also ==
- Categorization, general
- Classification of the sciences (Peirce)
- Linguistic typology
- Systematic name
