= Standard Industrial Classification =

System for classifying US industries

The Standard Industrial Classification (SIC) is a system for classifying industries by a four-digit code as a method of standardizing industry classification for statistical purposes across agencies. Established in the United States in 1937, it is used by government agencies to classify industry areas. Similar SIC systems are also used by agencies in other countries, e.g., by the United Kingdom's Companies House.

In the United States, the SIC system was last revised in 1987 and was last used by the Census Bureau for the 1992 Economic Census, and has been replaced by the North American Industry Classification System (NAICS code), which was released in 1997. Some U.S. government departments and agencies, such as the U.S. Securities and Exchange Commission (SEC), continue to use SIC codes.

The SIC code for an establishment, that is, a unique business with a registered U.S. headquarters, was determined by the industry appropriate for the overall largest product lines of the company or organization of which the establishment was a part. The later NAICS classification system has a different concept, assigning establishments into categories based on each one's output.

== History ==
The first edition of SIC was published in parts during 1938–1940, with revisions made in 1941–1942. The next edition was published in two parts in 1945 and 1949. Further revisions were issued in 1957, 1963, 1967, 1972, 1977, and 1987.

The SIC code system has been used since the 1930s. It was developed by the Interdepartmental Committee on Industrial Statistics, established by the Central Statistical Board who developed the List of Industries for manufacturing, published in 1938, and the 1939 List of Industries for non-manufacturing industries, which became the first Standard Industrial Classification for the United States. The SIC system was last revised in 1987 and was last used by the Census Bureau for the 1992 Economic Census.

The Office of Management and Budget, or OMB, was tasked with revising the SIC system to reflect changing economic conditions. The OMB established the Economic Classification Policy Committee in 1992 to develop a new system representative of the current industrial climate. The result was the North American Industry Classification System, or NAICS, a collaborative effort between Canada, the U.S. and Mexico. NAICS replaced the four-digit SIC code with a six-digit code, and it provided more flexibility in handling emerging industries (for example, the NAICS system more generally allows for "Other..." categories across industry groups). The new codes were implemented in Canada and the United States in 1997 and in Mexico one year later.

NAICS classified establishments (workplace) by their main output, instead of classifying them with the larger firm or organization of which the establishment was a part. This gives more precise information on establishment and worker activities than the SIC system, but changed the meaning of the classifications somewhat, making some time series of data hard to sustain accurately. Fort and Klimek (2016) found using longitudinal data on establishments that the switch from SIC to NAICS reclassified large numbers of workers differently by industry/sector than NAICS does, notably by reclassifying some from the Manufacturing sector into Services.

== Purpose ==
In the early 1900s, each branch of United States government agencies conducted business analysis using its own methods and metrics, unknown and meaningless to other branches. In the 1930s, the government needed standardized and meaningful methods to measure, analyze and share data across its various agencies. Thus, the Standard Industrial Classification system was born. SIC codes are four-digit numerical representations of major businesses and industries. SIC codes are assigned based on common characteristics shared in the products, services, production and delivery system of a business.

== Structure ==
SIC codes have a hierarchical, top-down structure that begins with general characteristics and narrows down to the specifics. The first two digits of the code represent the major industry sector to which a business belongs. The third and fourth digits describe the sub-classification of the business group and specialization, respectively. For example, "36" refers to a business that deals in "Electronic and Other Equipment." Adding "7" as a third digit to get "367" indicates that the business operates in "Electronic, Component and Accessories." The fourth digit distinguishes the specific industry sector, so a code of "3672" indicates that the business is concerned with "Printed Circuit Boards."

== Uses ==
The U.S. Census Bureau, Bureau of Labor Statistics, Internal Revenue Service and Social Security Administration utilize SIC codes in their reporting, although SIC codes are also used in academic and business sectors. The Bureau of Labor Statistics updates the codes every three years and uses SIC to report on work force, wages and pricing issues. The Social Security Administration assigns SIC codes to businesses based on the descriptions provided by employers under the primary business activity entry on employer ID applications.

== Limitations ==
Over the years, the U.S. Census has identified three major limitations to using the SIC system. The first limitation surrounds its definition and mistaken classification of employee groups. For example, administrative assistants in the automotive industry support all levels of the business, yet the SIC defines these employees as part of the "Basic Sector" of manufacturing jobs when they should be reported as "Non-Basic." Secondly, SIC codes were developed for traditional industries prior to 1970. Business has changed considerably since then from manufacturing-based to mostly service-based. As a result, and thirdly the SIC has been slow to recognize new and emerging industries, such as those in the computer, software, and information technology sectors.

== Codes ==
=== Range ===
The SIC codes can be grouped into progressively broader industry classifications: industry group, major group, and division. The first 3 digits of the SIC code indicate the industry group, and the first two digits indicate the major group. Each division encompasses a range of SIC codes:

Range of SIC Codes	Division
0100-0999	Agriculture, Forestry and Fishing
1000-1499	Mining
1500-1799	Construction
1800-1999	not used
2000-3999	Manufacturing
4000-4999	Transportation, Communications, Electric, Gas and Sanitary service
5000-5199	Wholesale Trade
5200-5999	Retail Trade
6000-6799	Finance, Insurance and Real estate
7000-8999	Services
9100-9729	Public administration
9900-9999	Nonclassifiable

To look at a particular example of the hierarchy, SIC code 2024 (ice cream and frozen desserts) belongs to industry group 202 (dairy products), which is part of major group 20 (food and kindred products), which belongs to the division of manufacturing.

=== List ===
The following table is from the SEC's website, which allows searching for companies by SIC code in its database of filings. The acronym NEC stands for "not elsewhere classified".

SIC Code	Industry
0100 (01111...)	Agricultural Production-Crops
0200	Agricultural Prod-Livestock & Animal Specialties
0700	Agricultural Services
0800	Forestry
0900	Fishing, Hunting and Trapping
1000	Metal Mining
1040	Gold and Silver Ores
1090	Miscellaneous Metal Ores
1220	Bituminous Coal & Lignite Mining
1221	Bituminous Coal & Lignite Surface Mining
1311	Crude Petroleum & Natural Gas
1381	Drilling Oil & Gas Wells
1382	Oil & Gas Field Exploration Services
1389	Oil & Gas Field Services, NEC
1400	Mining & Quarrying of Nonmetallic Minerals (No Fuels)
1520	General Bldg Contractors - Residential Bldgs
1531	Operative Builders
1540	General Bldg Contractors - Nonresidential Bldgs
1600	Heavy Construction Other Than Bldg Const - Contractors
1623	Water, Sewer, Pipeline, Comm & Power Line Construction
1629	Heavy Construction, Not Elsewhere Classified
1700	Construction - Special Trade Contractors
1731	Electrical Work
2000	Food and Kindred Products
2011	Meat packing plants
2013	Sausages & Other Prepared Meat Products
2015	Poultry Slaughtering and Processing
2020	Dairy Products
2024	Ice cream & frozen desserts
2030	Canned, Frozen & Preserved Fruit, Veg & Food Specialties
2033	Canned, Fruits, Veg, Preserves, Jams & Jellies
2040	Grain Mill Products
2050	Bakery Products
2052	Cookies & Crackers
2060	Sugar & Confectionery Products
2070	Fats & Oils
2080	Beverages
2082	Malt Beverages
2086	Bottled & Canned Soft Drinks & Carbonated Waters
2090	Miscellaneous Food Preparations & Kindred Products
2092	Prepared Fresh or Frozen Fish & Seafood
2100	Tobacco Products
2111	Cigarettes
2200	Textile Mill Products
2211	Broadwoven Fabric Mills, Cotton
2221	Broadwoven Fabric Mills, Man Made Fiber & Silk
2250	Knitting Mills
2253	Knit Outerwear Mills
2273	Carpets & Rugs
2300	Apparel & Other Finished Prods of Fabrics & Similar Matl
2320	Men's & Boys' Furnishings, Work Clothing, & Allied Garments
2330	Women's, Misses', and Juniors Outerwear
2340	Women's, Misses', Children's & Infant's Undergarments
2390	Miscellaneous Fabricated Textile Products
2400	Lumber & Wood Products (No Furniture)
2421	Sawmills & Planing Mills, General
2430	Millwood, Veneer, Plywood, & Structural Wood Members
2451	Mobile homes
2452	Prefabricated Wood Bldgs & Components
2510	Household Furniture
2511	Wood Household Furniture, (No Upholstered)
2520	Office Furniture
2522	Office Furniture (No Wood)
2531	Public Bldg & Related Furniture
2540	Partitions, Shelvg, Lockers, & office & Store Fixtures
2590	Miscellaneous Furniture & Fixtures
2600	Papers & Allied Products
2611	Pulp Mills
2621	Paper Mills
2631	Paperboard Mills
2650	Paperboard Containers & Boxes
2670	Converted Paper & Paperboard Prods (No Containers/Boxes)
2673	Plastics, Foil & Coated Paper Bags
2711	Newspapers: Publishing or Publishing & Printing
2721	Periodicals: Publishing or Publishing & Printing
2731	Books: Publishing or Publishing & Printing
2732	Book Printing
2741	Miscellaneous Publishing
2750	Commercial Printing
2761	Manifold Business Forms
2771	Greeting Cards
2780	Blankbooks, Looseleaf Binders & Bookbinding & Related Work
2790	Service Industries For The Printing Trade
2800	Chemicals & Allied Products
2810	Industrial Inorganic Chemicals
2820	Plastic Material, Synth Resin/Rubber, Cellulos (No Glass)
2821	Plastic Materials, Synth Resins & Nonvulcan Elastomers
2833	Medicinal Chemicals & Botanical Products
2834	Pharmaceutical Preparations
2835	In Vitro & In Vivo Diagnostic Substances
2836	Biological Products, (No Diagnostic Substances)
2840	Soap, Detergents, Cleaning Preparations, Perfumes, Cosmetics
2842	Specialty Cleaning, Polishing and Sanitation Preparations
2844	Perfumes, Cosmetics & Other Toilet Preparations
2851	Paints, Varnishes, Lacquers, Enamels & Allied Prods
2860	Industrial Organic Chemicals
2870	Agricultural chemicals
2890	Miscellaneous Chemical Products
2891	Adhesives & Sealants
2911	Petroleum Refining
2950	Asphalt Paving & Roofing Materials
2990	Miscellaneous Products of Petroleum & Coal
3011	Tires & Inner Tubes
3021	Rubber & Plastics Footwear
3050	Gaskets, Packg & Sealg Devices & Rubber & Plastics Hose
3060	Fabricated Rubber Products, NEC
3080	Miscellaneous Plastics Products
3081	Unsupported Plastics Film & Sheet
3086	Plastics Foam Products
3089	Plastics Products, NEC
3100	Leather & Leather Products
3140	Footwear, (No Rubber)
3211	Flat Glass
3220	Glass & Glassware, Pressed or Blown
3221	Glass Containers
3231	Glass Products, Made of Purchased Glass
3241	Cement, Hydraulic
3250	Structural Clay Products
3260	Pottery & Related Products
3270	Concrete, Gypsum & Plaster Products
3272	Concrete Products, Except Block & Brick
3281	Cut Stone & Stone Products
3290	Abrasive, Asbestos & Misc Nonmetallic Mineral Prods
3310	Steel Works, Blast Furnaces & Rolling & Finishing Mills
3312	Steel Works, Blast Furnaces & Rolling Mills (Coke Ovens)
3317	Steel Pipe & Tubes
3320	Iron & Steel Foundries
3330	Primary Smelting & Refining of Nonferrous Metals
3334	Primary Production of Aluminum
3341	Secondary Smelting & Refining of Nonferrous Metals
3350	Rolling Drawing & Extruding of Nonferrous Metals
3357	Drawing & Insulating of Nonferrous Wire
3360	Nonferrous Foundries (Castings)
3390	Miscellaneous Primary Metal Products
3411	Metal Cans
3412	Metal Shipping Barrels, Drums, Kegs & Pails
3420	Cutlery, Handtools & General Hardware
3430	Heating Equip, Except Elec & Warm Air; & Plumbing Fixtures
3433	Heating Equipment, Except Electric & Warm Air Furnaces
3440	Fabricated Structural Metal Products
3442	Metal Doors, Sash, Frames, Moldings & Trim
3443	Fabricated Plate Work (Boiler Shops)
3444	Sheet Metal Work
3448	Prefabricated Metal Buildings & Components
3451	Screw Machine Products
3452	Bolts, Nuts, Screws, Rivets & Washers
3460	Metal Forgings & Stampings
3470	Coating, Engraving & Allied Services
3480	Ordnance & Accessories, (No Vehicles/Guided Missiles)
3490	Miscellaneous Fabricated Metal Products
3510	Engines & Turbines
3523	Farm Machinery & Equipment
3524	Lawn & Garden Tractors & Home Lawn & Gardens Equip
3530	Construction, Mining & Materials Handling Machinery & Equip
3531	Construction Machinery & Equip
3532	Mining Machinery & Equip (No Oil & Gas Field Mach & Equip)
3533	Oil & Gas Field Machinery & Equipment
3537	Industrial Trucks, Tractors, Trailers & Stackers
3540	Metalworkg Machinery & Equipment
3541	Machine Tools, Metal Cutting Types
3550	Special Industry Machinery (No Metalworking Machinery)
3555	Printing Trades Machinery & Equipment
3559	Special Industry Machinery, NEC
3560	General Industrial Machinery & Equipment
3561	Pumps & Pumping Equipment
3562	Ball & Roller Bearings
3564	Industrial & Commercial Fans & Blowers & Air Purifying Equip
3567	Industrial Process Furnaces & Ovens
3569	General Industrial Machinery & Equipment, NEC
3570	Computer & office Equipment
3571	Electronic Computers
3572	Computer Storage Devices
3575	Computer Terminals
3576	Computer Communications Equipment
3577	Computer Peripheral Equipment, NEC
3578	Calculating & Accounting Machines (No Electronic Computers)
3579	Office Machines, NEC
3580	Refrigeration & Service Industry Machinery
3585	Air-Cond & Warm Air Heatg Equip & Comm & Indl Refrig Equip
3590	Misc Industrial & Commercial Machinery & Equipment
3600	Electronic & Other Electrical Equipment (No Computer Equip)
3612	Power, Distribution & Specialty Transformers
3613	Switchgear & Switchboard Apparatus
3620	Electrical Industrial Apparatus
3621	Motors & Generators
3630	Household Appliances
3634	Electric Housewares & Fans
3640	Electric Lighting & Wiring Equipment
3651	Household Audio & Video Equipment
3652	Phonograph Records & Prerecorded Audio Tapes & Disks
3661	Telephone & Telegraph Apparatus
3663	Radio & TV Broadcasting & Communications Equipment
3669	Communications Equipment, NEC
3670	Electronic Components & Accessories
3672	Printed Circuit Boards
3674	Semiconductors & Related Devices
3677	Electronic Coils, Transformers & Other Inductors
3678	Electronic Connectors
3679	Electronic Components, NEC
3690	Miscellaneous Electrical Machinery, Equipment & Supplies
3695	Magnetic & Optical Recording Media
3711	Motor Vehicles & Passenger Car Bodies
3713	Truck & Bus Bodies
3714	Motor Vehicle Parts & Accessories
3715	Truck Trailers
3716	Motor Homes
3720	Aircraft & Parts
3721	Aircraft
3724	Aircraft Engines & Engine Parts
3728	Aircraft Parts & Auxiliary Equipment, NEC
3730	Ship & Boat Building & Repairing
3743	Railroad Equipment
3751	Motorcycles, Bicycles & Parts
3760	Guided Missiles & Space Vehicles & Parts
3790	Miscellaneous Transportation Equipment
3812	Search, Detection, Navigation, Guidance, Aeronautical Sys
3821	Laboratory Apparatus & Furniture
3822	Auto Controls For Regulating Residential & Comml Environments
3823	Industrial Instruments For Measurement, Display, and Control
3824	Totalizing Fluid Meters & Counting Devices
3825	Instruments For Meas & Testing of Electricity & Elec Signals
3826	Laboratory Analytical Instruments
3827	Optical Instruments & Lenses
3829	Measuring & Controlling Devices, NEC
3841	Surgical & Medical Instruments & Apparatus
3842	Orthopedic, Prosthetic & Surgical Appliances & Supplies
3843	Dental Equipment & Supplies
3844	X-Ray Apparatus & Tubes & Related Irradiation Apparatus
3845	Electromedical & Electrotherapeutic Apparatus
3851	Ophthalmic Goods
3861	Photographic Equipment & Supplies
3873	Watches, Clocks, Clockwork Operated Devices/Parts
3910	Jewelry, Silverware & Plated Ware
3911	Jewelry, Precious Metal
3931	Musical Instruments
3942	Dolls & Stuffed Toys
3944	Games, Toys & Children's Vehicles (No Dolls & Bicycles)
3949	Sporting & Athletic Goods, NEC
3950	Pens, Pencils & Other Artists' Materials
3960	Costume Jewelry & Novelties
3990	Miscellaneous Manufacturing Industries
4011	Railroads, Line-Haul Operating
4013	Railroad Switching & Terminal Establishments
4100	Local & Suburban Transit & Interurban Hwy Passenger Trans
4210	Trucking & Courier Services (No Air)
4213	Trucking (No Local)
4220	Public Warehousing & Storage
4231	Terminal Maintenance Facilities For Motor Freight Transport
4400	Water Transportation
4412	Deep Sea Foreign Transportation of Freight
4512	Air Transportation, Scheduled
4513	Air Courier Services
4522	Air Transportation, Nonscheduled
4581	Airports, Flying Fields & Airport Terminal Services
4610	Pipe Lines (No Natural Gas)
4700	Transportation Services
4731	Arrangement of Transportation of Freight & Cargo
4812	Radiotelephone Communications
4813	Telephone Communications (No Radiotelephone)
4822	Telegraph & Other Message Communications
4832	Radio Broadcasting Stations
4833	Television Broadcasting Stations
4841	Cable & Other Pay Television Services
4899	Communications Services, NEC
4900	Electric, Gas & Sanitary Services
4911	Electric Services
4922	Natural Gas Transmission
4923	Natural Gas Transmission & Distribution
4924	Natural Gas Distribution
4931	Electric & Other Services Combined
4932	Gas & Other Services Combined
4941	Water Supply
4950	Sanitary Services
4953	Refuse Systems
4955	Hazardous Waste Management
4961	Steam & Air-Conditioning Supply
4991	Co-generation Services & Small Power Producers
5000	Wholesale-Durable Goods
5010	Wholesale-Motor Vehicles & Motor Vehicle Parts & Supplies
5013	Wholesale-Motor Vehicle Supplies & New Parts
5020	Wholesale-Furniture & Home Furnishings
5030	Wholesale-Lumber & Other Construction Materials
5031	Wholesale-Lumber, Plywood, millwork & Wood Panels
5040	Wholesale-Professional & Commercial Equipment & Supplies
5045	Wholesale-Computers & Peripheral Equipment & Software
5047	Wholesale-Medical, Dental & Hospital Equipment & Supplies
5050	Wholesale-Metals & Minerals (No Petroleum)
5051	Wholesale-Metals Service Centers & Offices
5063	Wholesale-Electrical Apparatus & Equipment, Wiring Supplies
5064	Wholesale-Electrical Appliances, TV & Radio Sets
5065	Wholesale-Electronic Parts & Equipment, NEC
5070	Wholesale-Hardware & Plumbing & Heating Equipment & Supplies
5072	Wholesale-Hardware
5080	Wholesale-Machinery, Equipment & Supplies
5082	Wholesale-Construction & Mining (No Petro) Machinery & Equip
5084	Wholesale-Industrial Machinery & Equipment
5090	Wholesale-Misc Durable Goods
5094	Wholesale-Jewelry, Watches, Precious Stones & Metals
5099	Wholesale-Durable Goods, NEC
5110	Wholesale-Paper & Paper Products
5122	Wholesale-Drugs, Proprietaries & Druggists' Sundries
5130	Wholesale-Apparel, Piece Goods & Notions
5140	Wholesale-Groceries & Related Products
5141	Wholesale-Groceries, General line (merchandise)
5150	Wholesale-Farm Product Raw Materials
5160	Wholesale-Chemicals & Allied Products
5171	Wholesale-Petroleum Bulk Stations & Terminals
5172	Wholesale-Petroleum & Petroleum Products (No Bulk Stations)
5180	Wholesale-Beer, Wine & Distilled Alcoholic Beverages
5190	Wholesale-Miscellaneous Non-durable Goods
5200	Retail-Building Materials, Hardware, Garden Supply
5211	Retail-Lumber & Other Building Materials Dealers
5271	Retail-Mobile Home Dealers
5311	Retail-Department Stores
5331	Retail-Variety Stores
5399	Retail-Misc general merchandise stores
5400	Retail-Food Stores
5411	Retail-Grocery Stores
5412	Retail-Convenience Stores
5500	Retail-Auto Dealers & Gasoline Stations
5511	Motor Vehicle Dealers (New and Used)
5531	Retail-Auto & Home Supply Stores
5551	Boat Dealers
5600	Retail-Apparel & Accessory Stores
5621	Retail-Women's Clothing Stores
5651	Retail-Family Clothing Stores
5661	Retail-Shoe Stores
5700	Retail-Home Furniture, Furnishings & Equipment Stores
5712	Retail-Furniture Stores
5731	Retail-Radio, TV & Consumer Electronics Stores
5734	Retail-Computer & Computer Software Stores
5735	Retail-Record & Prerecorded Tape Stores
5810	Retail-Eating & Drinking Places
5812	Retail-Eating Places
5900	Retail-Miscellaneous Retail
5912	Retail-Drug Stores and Proprietary Stores
5940	Retail-Miscellaneous Shopping Goods Stores
5944	Retail-Jewelry Stores
5945	Retail-Hobby, Toy & Game Shops
5960	Retail-Nonstore Retailers
5961	Retail-Catalog & Mail-Order Houses
5990	Retail-Retail Stores, NEC
6012	Pay Day Lenders
6021	National Commercial Banks
6022	State Commercial Banks
6029	Commercial Banks, NEC
6035	Savings Institution, Federally Chartered
6036	Savings Institutions, Not Federally Chartered
6099	Functions Related To Depository Banking, NEC
6111	Federal & Federally Sponsored Credit Agencies
6141	Personal Credit Institutions
6153	Short-Term Business Credit Institutions
6159	Miscellaneous Business Credit Institution
6162	Mortgage Bankers & Loan Correspondents
6163	Loan Brokers
6172	Finance Lessors
6189	Asset-Backed Securities
6199	Finance Services
6200	Security & Commodity Brokers, Dealers, Exchanges & Services
6211	Security Brokers, Dealers & Flotation Companies
6221	Commodity Contracts Brokers & Dealers
6282	Investment Advice
6311	Life Insurance
6321	Accident & Health Insurance
6324	Hospital & Medical Service Plans
6331	Fire, Marine & Casualty Insurance
6351	Surety Insurance
6361	Title Insurance
6399	Insurance Carriers, NEC
6411	Insurance Agents, Brokers & Service
6500	Real Estate
6510	Real Estate Operators (No Developers) & Lessors
6512	Operators of Nonresidential Buildings
6513	Operators of Apartment Buildings
6519	Lessors of Real Property, NEC
6531	Real Estate Agents & Managers (For Others)
6532	Real Estate Dealers (For Their Own Account)
6552	Land Subdividers & Developers (No Cemeteries)
6770	Blank Checks
6792	Oil Royalty Traders
6794	Patent Owners & Lessors
6795	Mineral Royalty Traders
6798	Real Estate Investment Trusts
6799	Investors, NEC
7000	Hotels, Rooming Houses, Camps & Other Lodging Places
7011	Hotels & Motels
7200	Services-Personal Services
7310	Services-Advertising
7311	Services-Advertising Agencies
7320	Services-Consumer Credit Reporting, Collection Agencies
7330	Services-Mailing, Reproduction, Commercial Art & Photography
7331	Services-Direct Mail Advertising Services
7334	Services-Photocopying and Duplicating Services
7340	Services-To Dwellings & Other Buildings
7350	Services-Miscellaneous Equipment Rental & Leasing
7359	Services-Equipment Rental & Leasing, NEC
7361	Services-Employment Agencies
7363	Services-Help Supply Services
7370	Services-Computer Programming, Data Processing, Etc.
7371	Services-Computer Programming Services
7372	Services-Prepackaged Software
7373	Services-Computer Integrated Systems Design
7374	Services-Computer Processing & Data Preparation
7377	Services-Computer Rental & Leasing
7380	Services-Miscellaneous Business Services
7381	Services-Detective, Guard & Armored Car Services
7384	Services-Photofinishing Laboratories
7385	Services-Telephone Interconnect Systems
7389	Services-Business Services, NEC
7500	Services-Automotive Repair, Services & Parking
7510	Services-Auto Rental & Leasing (No Drivers)
7600	Services-Miscellaneous Repair Services
7812	Services-Motion Picture & Video Tape Production
7819	Services-Allied To Motion Picture Production
7822	Services-Motion Picture & Video Tape Distribution
7829	Services-Allied To Motion Picture Distribution
7830	Services-Motion Picture Theaters
7841	Services-Video Tape Rental
7900	Services-Amusement & Recreation Services
7948	Services-Racing, Including Track Operation
7990	Services-Miscellaneous Amusement & Recreation
7994	Services-Video Game Arcades
7995	Services-Gambling Transactions
7996	Services-Amusement Parks
7997	Services-Membership Sports & Recreation Clubs
8000	Services-Health Services
8011	Services-Offices & Clinics of Doctors of Medicine
8050	Services-Nursing & Personal Care Facilities
8051	Services-Skilled Nursing Care Facilities
8060	Services-Hospitals
8062	Services-General Medical & Surgical Hospitals, NEC
8071	Services-Medical Laboratories
8082	Services-Home Health Care Services
8090	Services-Misc Health & Allied Services, NEC
8093	Services-Specialty Outpatient Facilities, NEC
8111	Services-Legal Services
8200	Services-Educational Services
8300	Services-Social Services
8351	Services-Child Day Care Services
8600	Services-Membership organizations
8661	Religious organizations, churches, places of worship, religious instruction
8700	Services-Engineering, Accounting, Research, Management
8711	Services-Engineering Services
8731	Services-Commercial Physical & Biological Research
8734	Services-Testing Laboratories
8741	Services-Management Services
8742	Services-Management Consulting Services
8744	Services-Facilities Support Management Services
8748	Business Consulting Services, Not Elsewhere Classified
8880	American Depositary Receipts
8888	Foreign Governments
8900	Services-Services, NEC
9721	International Affairs
9995	Non-Operating Establishments

== See also ==
- Australian and New Zealand Standard Industrial Classification
- Global Industry Classification Standard
- Industry Classification Benchmark (ICB)
- International Standard Industrial Classification
- Merchant category code
- North American Industry Classification System
- United Kingdom Standard Industrial Classification of Economic Activities
