= Military taxonomy =

Classifying diffenet military domains and paradigms

Military taxonomy encompasses the domains of weapons, equipment, organizations, strategies, and tactics. The use of taxonomies in the military extends beyond its value as an indexing tool or record-keeping template.

== Blink of an eye ==
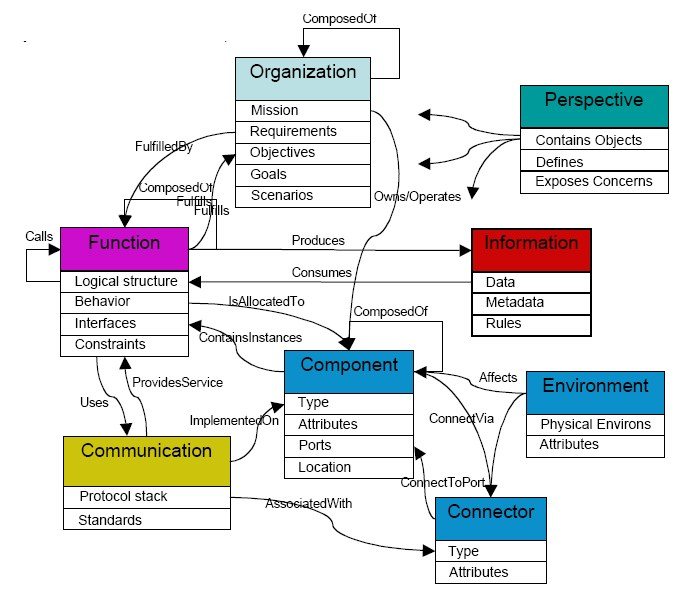
This NASA-generated chart expresses a framework for modeling non-military space systems architectures; but it could be construed as a military taxonomy -- modeling military space systems architectures.

Military theorist Carl von Clausewitz stressed the significance of grasping the fundamentals of any situation in the "blink of an eye" (coup d'œil). In a military context, the astute tactician can immediately grasp a range of implications and can begin to anticipate plausible and appropriate courses of action. Clausewitz' conceptual "blink" represents a tentative ontology which organizes a set of concepts within a domain.

A conventional military taxonomy might be an hierarchical set of classifications for a given set of objects; and the progress of reasoning is developed from the general to the more specific. In such taxonomic schema, a conflative term is always a polyseme.

In contrast, a less conventional approach might employ an open-ended contextual military taxonomy—a taxonomy holding only with respect to a specific context; and the progress of reasoning is developed form the specific to the more general.

== Descriptive paradigm ==
A taxonomy of terms to describe various types of military operations is fundamentally affected by the way all elements are defined and addressed—not unlike framing.

In terms of a specific military operation, a taxonomic approach based on differentiation and categorization of the entities participating would produce results which were quite different from an approach based on functional objective of an operation (such as peacekeeping, disaster relief, or counter-terrorism). An incidental advantage which flows from give-and-take in refining taxonomic terms more accurately and efficiently becomes more than a worthwhile objective in terms of anticipated outcomes or results. In today's nontraditional operations, the discussion about fundamentals also generates greater precision in how the defense and security community understands and discusses integrated operations.

=== Hyūga-class helicopter destroyer ===
Military taxonomy in Japan is circumscribed by Japan's pacifist post-war constitution. For example, this affects classification of the Hyūga-class helicopter carriers, which are ships of the Japan Maritime Self-Defense Force (JMSDF).

This type of helicopter carrier was formally identified as a helicopter destroyer (DDH) to comply with explicit constitutional limitations written in Article 9 of the Japanese Constitution.

The two ships of this class, the JS Hyūga and the JS Ise resemble a light aircraft carrier or amphibious assault ship such as the Italian Navy's 13,850-ton Giuseppe Garibaldi, the Spanish Navy's 17,000-ton Príncipe de Asturias or the Royal Navy's 21,000-ton Invincible-class carriers. According to a PBS documentary, JS Hyūga is the "first Japanese aircraft carrier built since WWII;" but this label is controversial. A taxonomic label of "aircraft carrier" is legally proscribed.

Each ship in this class has attracted media and Diet attention because of its resemblance to an aircraft carrier. Until the 1970s, US Navy taxonomy categorized large-scale flattops as "attack aircraft carriers" and small flattops as "antisubmarine aircraft carriers." In Japan, the constitutional prohibition against having "attack" aircraft carries has been construed to encompass small aircraft carriers but not helicopter carriers.

A uniquely Japanese taxonomic template is applied to these ships and to their missions, which are limited to "military operations other than war" (MOOTW).

== Strategic paradigm ==
A number of military strategies can be parsed using a taxonomy model. The comparative theoretical framework might posit a range of criteria, e.g., the character of envisaged political goals, the type of military strategy preferred, and the scope of forces engaged; and this template suggests discrete modes of force. The taxonomy-model analysis suggests a useful depiction of the spectrum of the use of military force in a political context.

=== Parsing terrorism ===
In the 21st century, the ambit of a subset taxonomy of terrorism would include terms related to terrorists, terrorist groups, terrorist attacks, weapons, venues, and characteristics of terrorists and terrorist groups.

== Limitations ==
Taxonomies offer useful, but incomplete means of structuring information.

Taxonomies are a necessary but not sufficient condition for adequate evaluation of a given data set. While the taxonomic categorizations and sub-categorizations do enhance understanding, it may be significant that the lack of detail in describing objects or elements creates room for ambiguity.

== See also ==
- Conflation
- Visual analytics
