= Industry Classification Benchmark =

Financial taxonomy

The Industry Classification Benchmark (ICB) is an industry classification taxonomy launched by Dow Jones and FTSE in 2005 and now used by FTSE International and STOXX. It is used to segregate markets into sectors within the macroeconomy. The ICB uses a system of 11 industries, partitioned into 20 supersectors, which are further divided into 45 sectors, which then contain 173 subsectors.

The ICB is used globally (though not universally) to divide the market into increasingly specific categories, allowing investors to compare industry trends between well-defined subsectors. The ICB replaced the legacy FTSE and Dow Jones classification systems on 3 January 2006, and is used today by the NASDAQ, NYSE and several other markets around the globe. All ICB sectors are represented on the New York Stock Exchange except Equity Investment Instruments (8980) and Nonequity Investment Instruments (8990).

Dow Jones divested itself of its 50% interest in the ICB in 2011 and announced it was creating its own version of it.

== Classification ==
- ICB
  - Technology
    - Technology
      - Software and Computer Services
        - Computer Services (10101010)
        - Software (10101015)
        - Consumer Digital Services (10101020)
      - Technology Hardware and Equipment
        - Semiconductors (10102010)
        - Electronic Components (10102015)
        - Production Technology Equipment (10102020)
        - Computer Hardware (10102030)
        - Electronic Office Equipment (10102035)
  - Telecommunications
    - Telecommunications
      - Telecommunications Equipment
        - Telecommunications Equipment (15101010)
      - Telecommunications Service Providers
        - Cable Television Services (15102010)
        - Telecommunications Services (15102015)
  - Health Care
    - Health Care
      - Health Care Providers
        - Health Care Facilities (20101010)
        - Health Care Management Services (20101020)
        - Health Care Services (20101025)
        - Health Care: Misc. (20101030)
      - Medical Equipment and Services
        - Medical Equipment (20102010)
        - Medical Supplies (20102015)
        - Medical Services (20102020)
      - Pharmaceuticals and Biotechnology
        - Biotechnology (20103010)
        - Pharmaceuticals (20103015)
        - Cannabis Producers (20103020)
  - Financials
    - Banks
      - Banks
        - Banks (30101010)
    - Financial Services
      - Finance and Credit Services
        - Consumer Lending (30201020)
        - Mortgage Finance (30201025)
        - Financial Data Providers (30201030)
      - Investment Banking and Brokerage Services
        - Diversified Financial Services (30202000)
        - Asset Managers and Custodians (30202010)
        - Investment Services (30202015)
      - Mortgage Real Estate Investment Trusts
        - Mortgage REITs: Diversified (30203000)
        - Mortgage REITs: Commercial (30203010)
        - Mortgage REITs: Residential (30203020)
      - Closed End Investments
        - Closed End Investments (30204000)
      - Open End and Miscellaneous Investment Vehicles
        - Open End and Miscellaneous Investment Vehicles (30205000)
    - Insurance
      - Life Insurance
        - Life Insurance (30301010)
      - Non-life Insurance
        - Full Line Insurance (30302010)
        - Insurance Brokers (30302015)
        - Reinsurance (30302020)
        - Property and Casualty Insurance (30302025)
  - Real Estate
    - Real Estate
      - Real Estate Investment and Services
        - Real Estate Holding and Development (35101010)
        - Real Estate Services (35101015)
      - Real Estate Investment Trusts
        - Diversified REITs (35102000)
        - Health Care REITs (35102010)
        - Hotel and Lodging REITs (35102015)
        - Industrial REITs (35102020)
        - Infrastructure REITs (35102025)
        - Office REITs (35102030)
        - Residential REITs (35102040)
        - Retail REITs (35102045)
        - Storage REITs (35102050)
        - Timber REITs (35102060)
        - Other Specialty REITs (35102070)
  - Consumer Discretionary
    - Automobiles and Parts
      - Automobiles and Parts
        - Auto Services (40101010)
        - Tires (40101015)
        - Automobiles (40101020)
        - Auto Parts (40101025)
    - Consumer Products and Services
      - Consumer Services
        - Education Services (40201010)
        - Funeral Parlors and Cemetery (40201020)
        - Printing and Copying Services (40201030)
        - Rental and Leasing Services: Consumer (40201040)
        - Storage Facilities (40201050)
        - Vending and Catering Service (40201060)
        - Consumer Services: Misc. (40201070)
      - Household Goods and Home Construction
        - Home Construction (40202010)
        - Household Furnishings (40202015)
        - Household Appliance (40202020)
        - Household Equipment and Products (40202025)
      - Leisure Goods
        - Consumer Electronics (40203010)
        - Electronic Entertainment (40203040)
        - Toys (40203045)
        - Recreational Products (40203050)
        - Recreational Vehicles and Boats (40203055)
        - Photography (40203060)
      - Personal Goods
        - Clothing and Accessories (40204020)
        - Footwear (40204025)
        - Luxury Items (40204030)
        - Cosmetics (40204035)
    - Media
      - Media
        - Entertainment (40301010)
        - Media Agencies (40301020)
        - Publishing (40301030)
        - Radio and TV Broadcasters (40301035)
    - Retail
      - Retailers
        - Diversified Retailers (40401010)
        - Apparel Retailers (40401020)
        - Home Improvement Retailers (40401025)
        - Specialty Retailers (40401030)
    - Travel and Leisure
      - Travel and Leisure
        - Airlines (40501010)
        - Travel and Tourism (40501015)
        - Casinos and Gambling (40501020)
        - Hotels and Motels (40501025)
        - Recreational Services (40501030)
        - Restaurants and Bars (40501040)
  - Consumer Staples
    - Food, Beverage and Tobacco
      - Beverages
        - Brewers (45101010)
        - Distillers and Vintners (45101015)
        - Soft Drinks (45101020)
      - Food Producers
        - Farming, Fishing, Ranching and Plantations (45102010)
        - Food Products (45102020)
        - Fruit and Grain Processing (45102030)
        - Sugar (45102035)
      - Tobacco
        - Tobacco (45103010)
    - Personal Care, Drug and Grocery Stores
      - Personal Care, Drug and Grocery Stores
        - Food Retailers and Wholesalers (45201010)
        - Drug Retailers (45201015)
        - Personal Products (45201020)
        - Nondurable Household Products (45201030)
        - Miscellaneous Consumer Staple Goods (45201040)
  - Industrials
    - Construction and Materials
      - Construction and Materials
        - Construction (50101010)
        - Engineering and Contracting Services (50101015)
        - Building, Roofing/Wallboard and Plumbing (50101020)
        - Building: Climate Control (50101025)
        - Cement (50101030)
        - Building Materials: Other (50101035)
    - Industrial Goods and Services
      - Aerospace and Defense
        - Aerospace (50201010)
        - Defense (50201020)
      - Electronic and Electrical Equipment
        - Electrical Components (50202010)
        - Electronic Equipment: Control and Filter (50202020)
        - Electronic Equipment: Gauges and Meters (50202025)
        - Electronic Equipment: Pollution Control (50202030)
        - Electronic Equipment: Other (50202040)
      - General Industrials
        - Diversified Industrials (50203000)
        - Paints and Coatings (50203010)
        - Plastics (50203015)
        - Glass (50203020)
        - Containers and Packaging (50203030)
      - Industrial Engineering
        - Machinery: Industrial (50204000)
        - Machinery: Agricultural (50204010)
        - Machinery: Construction and Handling (50204020)
        - Machinery: Engines (50204030)
        - Machinery: Tools (50204040)
        - Machinery: Specialty (50204050)
      - Industrial Support Services
        - Industrial Suppliers (50205010)
        - Transaction Processing Services (50205015)
        - Professional Business Support Services (50205020)
        - Business Training and Employment Agencies (50205025)
        - Forms and Bulk Printing Services (50205030)
        - Security Services (50205040)
      - Industrial Transportation
        - Trucking (50206010)
        - Commercial Vehicles and Parts (50206015)
        - Railroads (50206020)
        - Railroad Equipment (50206025)
        - Marine Transportation (50206030)
        - Delivery Services (50206040)
        - Commercial Vehicle-Equipment Leasing (50206050)
        - Transportation Services (50206060)
  - Basic Materials
    - Basic Resources
      - Industrial Materials
        - Diversified Materials (55101000)
        - Forestry (55101010)
        - Paper (55101015)
        - Textile Products (55101020)
      - Industrial Metals and Mining
        - General Mining (55102000)
        - Iron and Steel (55102010)
        - Metal Fabricating (55102015)
        - Aluminum (55102035)
        - Copper (55102040)
        - Nonferrous Metals (55102050)
      - Precious Metals and Mining
        - Diamonds and Gemstones (55103020)
        - Gold Mining (55103025)
        - Platinum and Precious Metals (55103030)
    - Chemicals
      - Chemicals
        - Chemicals: Diversified (55201000)
        - Chemicals and Synthetic Fibers (55201010)
        - Fertilizers (55201015)
        - Specialty Chemicals (55201020)
  - Energy
    - Energy
      - Oil, Gas and Coal
        - Integrated Oil and Gas (60101000)
        - Oil: Crude Producers (60101010)
        - Offshore Drilling and Other Services (60101015)
        - Oil Refining and Marketing (60101020)
        - Oil Equipment and Services (60101030)
        - Pipelines (60101035)
        - Coal (60101040)
      - Alternative Energy
        - Alternative Fuels (60102010)
        - Renewable Energy Equipment (60102020)
  - Utilities
    - Utilities
      - Electricity
        - Alternative Electricity (65101010)
        - Conventional Electricity (65101015)
      - Gas, Water and Multi-utilities
        - Multi-Utilities (65102000)
        - Gas Distribution (65102020)
        - Water (65102030)
      - Waste and Disposal Services
        - Waste and Disposal Services (65103035)

Per the FTSE Global Total Cap Index, Information Technology is the biggest sector, with 25% of world capitalisation.

== See also ==
- Australian and New Zealand Standard Industrial Classification
- Global Industry Classification Standard
- International Standard Industrial Classification
- North American Industry Classification System
- Standard Industrial Classification
- Statistical Classification of Economic Activities in the European Community (NACE)
- Thomson Reuters Business Classification
