= International Standard Industrial Classification =

United Nations industry classification system

The International Standard Industrial Classification of All Economic Activities (ISIC) is a United Nations industry classification system. Wide use has been made of ISIC in classifying data according to kind of economic activity in the fields of employment and health data.

It is maintained by the United Nations Statistics Division.

ISIC classifies entities by activity. The most detailed categories are defined by combinations of activities described in statistical units, considering the relative importance of the activities included in these classes.

ISIC Rev.4 continues to use criteria such as input, output and use of the products produced, but places additional emphasis on production processes.

== Revision history ==
The United Nations Statistics Division has published the following revisions of the ISIC standard:

- Revision 1 – Published in 1958
- Revision 2 – Published in 1968
- Revision 3 – Published in 1989
- Revision 3.1 – Published in 2002
- Revision 4 – Published by the United Nations in 2008
- Revision 5 – Endorsed in 2023, but not yet fully published.

== ISIC Revision 4 (2008) broad structure ==
- Section A – Agriculture, forestry and fishing
- Section B – Mining and quarrying
- Section C – Manufacturing
- Section D – Electricity, gas, steam and air conditioning supply
- Section E – Water supply; sewerage, waste management and remediation activities
- Section F – Construction
- Section G – Wholesale and retail trade; repair and selling of motor vehicles and motorcycles
- Section H – Transportation and storage
- Section I – Accommodation and food service activities
- Section J – Information and communication
- Section K – Financial and insurance activities
- Section L – Real estate activities
- Section M – Professional, scientific and technical activities
- Section N – Administrative and support service activities
- Section O – Public administration and defence; compulsory social security
- Section P – Education
- Section Q – Human health and social work activities
- Section R – Arts, entertainment and recreation
- Section S – Other service activities
- Section T – Activities of households as employers; undifferentiated goods- and services-producing activities of households for own use
- Section U – Activities of extraterritorial organizations and bodies

== See also ==
- Standard Industrial Classification (United States)
- Trade Map, HS products by hierarchy (International Trade Centre)
- North American Industry Classification System
- United Kingdom Standard Industrial Classification of Economic Activities
- Russian Economic Activities Classification System (OKVED) (in Russian)
- Australian and New Zealand Standard Industrial Classification
- Industry Classification Benchmark (ICB)
- Global Industry Classification Standard
- Statistical classification of economic activities in the European Community (NACE)
- Industry information (industry classifications)
- French classification of economic activities, named NAF code or APE code (in French)
- German classification of economic sectors, currently used version from 2008 (in German)

== Sources ==
- United Nations Statistics Division: International Family of Classifications
