= Global Industry Classification Standard =

Industry taxonomy

The Global Industry Classification Standard (GICS) is an industry taxonomy developed in 1999 by MSCI and Standard & Poor's (S&P) for use by the global financial community. The GICS structure consists of 11 sectors, 25 industry groups, 74 industries and 163 sub-industries into which S&P has categorized all major public companies. The system is similar to ICB (Industry Classification Benchmark), a classification structure maintained by FTSE Group.

GICS is used as a basis for S&P and MSCI indexes used in the financial field with each company assigned using its principal business activity to a sub-industry, industry, industry group, and sector. "GICS" is a registered trademark of McGraw Hill Financial and MSCI Inc.

== Classification ==
The classification is as follows:

Sector		Industry Group		Industry		Sub-Industry	
10	Energy	1010	Energy	101010	Energy Equipment & Services	10101010	Oil & Gas Drilling
10	Energy	1010	Energy	101010	Energy Equipment & Services	10101020	Oil & Gas Equipment & Services
10	Energy	1010	Energy	101020	Oil, Gas & Consumable Fuels	10102010	Integrated Oil & Gas
10	Energy	1010	Energy	101020	Oil, Gas & Consumable Fuels	10102020	Oil & Gas Exploration & Production
10	Energy	1010	Energy	101020	Oil, Gas & Consumable Fuels	10102030	Oil & Gas Refining & Marketing
10	Energy	1010	Energy	101020	Oil, Gas & Consumable Fuels	10102040	Oil & Gas Storage & Transportation
10	Energy	1010	Energy	101020	Oil, Gas & Consumable Fuels	10102050	Coal & Consumable Fuels
15	Materials	1510	Materials	151010	Chemicals	15101010	Commodity Chemicals
15	Materials	1510	Materials	151010	Chemicals	15101020	Diversified Chemicals
15	Materials	1510	Materials	151010	Chemicals	15101030	Fertilizers & Agricultural Chemicals
15	Materials	1510	Materials	151010	Chemicals	15101040	Industrial Gases
15	Materials	1510	Materials	151010	Chemicals	15101050	Specialty Chemicals
15	Materials	1510	Materials	151020	Construction Materials	15102010	Construction Materials
15	Materials	1510	Materials	151030	Containers & Packaging	15103010	Metal, Glass & Plastic Containers
15	Materials	1510	Materials	151030	Containers & Packaging	15103020	Paper & Plastic Packaging Products & Materials
15	Materials	1510	Materials	151040	Metals & Mining	15104010	Aluminum
15	Materials	1510	Materials	151040	Metals & Mining	15104020	Diversified Metals & Mining
15	Materials	1510	Materials	151040	Metals & Mining	15104025	Copper
15	Materials	1510	Materials	151040	Metals & Mining	15104030	Gold
15	Materials	1510	Materials	151040	Metals & Mining	15104040	Precious Metals & Minerals
15	Materials	1510	Materials	151040	Metals & Mining	15104045	Silver
15	Materials	1510	Materials	151040	Metals & Mining	15104050	Steel
15	Materials	1510	Materials	151050	Paper & Forest Products	15105010	Forest Products
15	Materials	1510	Materials	151050	Paper & Forest Products	15105020	Paper Products
20	Industrials	2010	Capital Goods	201010	Aerospace & Defense	20101010	Aerospace & Defense
20	Industrials	2010	Capital Goods	201020	Building Products	20102010	Building Products
20	Industrials	2010	Capital Goods	201030	Construction & Engineering	20103010	Construction & Engineering
20	Industrials	2010	Capital Goods	201040	Electrical Equipment	20104010	Electrical Components & Equipment
20	Industrials	2010	Capital Goods	201040	Electrical Equipment	20104020	Heavy Electrical Equipment
20	Industrials	2010	Capital Goods	201050	Industrial Conglomerates	20105010	Industrial Conglomerates
20	Industrials	2010	Capital Goods	201060	Machinery	20106010	Construction Machinery & Heavy Transportation Equipment
20	Industrials	2010	Capital Goods	201060	Machinery	20106015	Agricultural & Farm Machinery
20	Industrials	2010	Capital Goods	201060	Machinery	20106020	Industrial Machinery & Supplies & Components
20	Industrials	2010	Capital Goods	201070	Trading Companies & Distributors	20107010	Trading Companies & Distributors
20	Industrials	2020	Commercial & Professional Services	202010	Commercial Services & Supplies	20201010	Commercial Printing
20	Industrials	2020	Commercial & Professional Services	202010	Commercial Services & Supplies	20201050	Environmental & Facilities Services
20	Industrials	2020	Commercial & Professional Services	202010	Commercial Services & Supplies	20201060	Office Services & Supplies
20	Industrials	2020	Commercial & Professional Services	202010	Commercial Services & Supplies	20201070	Diversified Support Services
20	Industrials	2020	Commercial & Professional Services	202010	Commercial Services & Supplies	20201080	Security & Alarm Services
20	Industrials	2020	Commercial & Professional Services	202020	Professional Services	20202010	Human Resource & Employment Services
20	Industrials	2020	Commercial & Professional Services	202020	Professional Services	20202020	Research & Consulting Services
20	Industrials	2020	Commercial & Professional Services	202020	Professional Services	20202030	Data Processing & Outsourced Services
20	Industrials	2030	Transportation	203010	Air Freight & Logistics	20301010	Air Freight & Logistics
20	Industrials	2030	Transportation	203020	Passenger Airlines	20302010	Passenger Airlines
20	Industrials	2030	Transportation	203030	Marine Transportation	20303010	Marine Transportation
20	Industrials	2030	Transportation	203040	Ground Transportation	20304010	Rail Transportation
20	Industrials	2030	Transportation	203040	Ground Transportation	20304030	Cargo Ground Transportation
20	Industrials	2030	Transportation	203040	Ground Transportation	20304040	Passenger Ground Transportation
20	Industrials	2030	Transportation	203050	Transportation Infrastructure	20305010	Airport Services
20	Industrials	2030	Transportation	203050	Transportation Infrastructure	20305020	Highways & Railtracks
20	Industrials	2030	Transportation	203050	Transportation Infrastructure	20305030	Marine Ports & Services
25	Consumer Discretionary	2510	Automobiles & Components	251010	Automobile Components	25101010	Automotive Parts & Equipment
25	Consumer Discretionary	2510	Automobiles & Components	251010	Automobile Components	25101020	Tires & Rubber
25	Consumer Discretionary	2510	Automobiles & Components	251020	Automobiles	25102010	Automobile Manufacturers
25	Consumer Discretionary	2510	Automobiles & Components	251020	Automobiles	25102020	Motorcycle Manufacturers
25	Consumer Discretionary	2520	Consumer Durables & Apparel	252010	Household Durables	25201010	Consumer Electronics
25	Consumer Discretionary	2520	Consumer Durables & Apparel	252010	Household Durables	25201020	Home Furnishings
25	Consumer Discretionary	2520	Consumer Durables & Apparel	252010	Household Durables	25201030	Homebuilding
25	Consumer Discretionary	2520	Consumer Durables & Apparel	252010	Household Durables	25201040	Household Appliances
25	Consumer Discretionary	2520	Consumer Durables & Apparel	252010	Household Durables	25201050	Housewares & Specialties
25	Consumer Discretionary	2520	Consumer Durables & Apparel	252020	Leisure Products	25202010	Leisure Products
25	Consumer Discretionary	2520	Consumer Durables & Apparel	252030	Textiles, Apparel & Luxury Goods	25203010	Apparel, Accessories & Luxury Goods
25	Consumer Discretionary	2520	Consumer Durables & Apparel	252030	Textiles, Apparel & Luxury Goods	25203020	Footwear
25	Consumer Discretionary	2520	Consumer Durables & Apparel	252030	Textiles, Apparel & Luxury Goods	25203030	Textiles
25	Consumer Discretionary	2530	Consumer Services	253010	Hotels, Restaurants & Leisure	25301010	Casinos & Gaming
25	Consumer Discretionary	2530	Consumer Services	253010	Hotels, Restaurants & Leisure	25301020	Hotels, Resorts & Cruise Lines
25	Consumer Discretionary	2530	Consumer Services	253010	Hotels, Restaurants & Leisure	25301030	Leisure Facilities
25	Consumer Discretionary	2530	Consumer Services	253010	Hotels, Restaurants & Leisure	25301040	Restaurants
25	Consumer Discretionary	2530	Consumer Services	253020	Diversified Consumer Services	25302010	Education Services
25	Consumer Discretionary	2530	Consumer Services	253020	Diversified Consumer Services	25302020	Specialized Consumer Services
25	Consumer Discretionary	2550	Consumer Discretionary Distribution & Retail	255010	Distributors	25501010	Distributors
25	Consumer Discretionary	2550	Consumer Discretionary Distribution & Retail	255030	Broadline Retail	25503030	Broadline Retail
25	Consumer Discretionary	2550	Consumer Discretionary Distribution & Retail	255040	Specialty Retail	25504010	Apparel Retail
25	Consumer Discretionary	2550	Consumer Discretionary Distribution & Retail	255040	Specialty Retail	25504020	Computer & Electronics Retail
25	Consumer Discretionary	2550	Consumer Discretionary Distribution & Retail	255040	Specialty Retail	25504030	Home Improvement Retail
25	Consumer Discretionary	2550	Consumer Discretionary Distribution & Retail	255040	Specialty Retail	25504040	Other Specialty Retail
25	Consumer Discretionary	2550	Consumer Discretionary Distribution & Retail	255040	Specialty Retail	25504050	Automotive Retail
25	Consumer Discretionary	2550	Consumer Discretionary Distribution & Retail	255040	Specialty Retail	25504060	Homefurnishing Retail
30	Consumer Staples	3010	Consumer Staples Distribution & Retail	301010	Consumer Staples Distribution & Retail	30101010	Drug Retail
30	Consumer Staples	3010	Consumer Staples Distribution & Retail	301010	Consumer Staples Distribution & Retail	30101020	Food Distributors
30	Consumer Staples	3010	Consumer Staples Distribution & Retail	301010	Consumer Staples Distribution & Retail	30101030	Food Retail
30	Consumer Staples	3010	Consumer Staples Distribution & Retail	301010	Consumer Staples Distribution & Retail	30101040	Consumer Staples Merchandise Retail
30	Consumer Staples	3020	Food, Beverage & Tobacco	302010	Beverages	30201010	Brewers
30	Consumer Staples	3020	Food, Beverage & Tobacco	302010	Beverages	30201020	Distillers & Vintners
30	Consumer Staples	3020	Food, Beverage & Tobacco	302010	Beverages	30201030	Soft Drinks & Non-alcoholic Beverages
30	Consumer Staples	3020	Food, Beverage & Tobacco	302020	Food Products	30202010	Agricultural Products & Services
30	Consumer Staples	3020	Food, Beverage & Tobacco	302020	Food Products	30202030	Packaged Foods & Meats
30	Consumer Staples	3020	Food, Beverage & Tobacco	302030	Tobacco	30203010	Tobacco
30	Consumer Staples	3030	Household & Personal Products	303010	Household Products	30301010	Household Products
30	Consumer Staples	3030	Household & Personal Products	303020	Personal Care Products	30302010	Personal Care Products
35	Health Care	3510	Health Care Equipment & Services	351010	Health Care Equipment & Supplies	35101010	Health Care Equipment
35	Health Care	3510	Health Care Equipment & Services	351010	Health Care Equipment & Supplies	35101020	Health Care Supplies
35	Health Care	3510	Health Care Equipment & Services	351020	Health Care Providers & Services	35102010	Health Care Distributors
35	Health Care	3510	Health Care Equipment & Services	351020	Health Care Providers & Services	35102015	Health Care Services
35	Health Care	3510	Health Care Equipment & Services	351020	Health Care Providers & Services	35102020	Health Care Facilities
35	Health Care	3510	Health Care Equipment & Services	351020	Health Care Providers & Services	35102030	Managed Health Care
35	Health Care	3510	Health Care Equipment & Services	351030	Health Care Technology	35103010	Health Care Technology
35	Health Care	3520	Pharmaceuticals, Biotechnology & Life Sciences	352010	Biotechnology	35201010	Biotechnology
35	Health Care	3520	Pharmaceuticals, Biotechnology & Life Sciences	352020	Pharmaceuticals	35202010	Pharmaceuticals
35	Health Care	3520	Pharmaceuticals, Biotechnology & Life Sciences	352030	Life Sciences Tools & Services	35203010	Life Sciences Tools & Services
40	Financials	4010	Banks	401010	Banks	40101010	Diversified Banks
40	Financials	4010	Banks	401010	Banks	40101015	Regional Banks
40	Financials	4020	Financial Services	402010	Financial Services	40201020	Diversified Financial Services
40	Financials	4020	Financial Services	402010	Financial Services	40201030	Multi-Sector Holdings
40	Financials	4020	Financial Services	402010	Financial Services	40201040	Specialized Finance
40	Financials	4020	Financial Services	402010	Financial Services	40201050	Commercial & Residential Mortgage Finance
40	Financials	4020	Financial Services	402010	Financial Services	40201060	Transaction & Payment Processing Services
40	Financials	4020	Financial Services	402020	Consumer Finance	40202010	Consumer Finance
40	Financials	4020	Financial Services	402030	Capital Markets	40203010	Asset Management & Custody Banks
40	Financials	4020	Financial Services	402030	Capital Markets	40203020	Investment Banking & Brokerage
40	Financials	4020	Financial Services	402030	Capital Markets	40203030	Diversified Capital Markets
40	Financials	4020	Financial Services	402030	Capital Markets	40203040	Financial Exchanges & Data
40	Financials	4020	Financial Services	402040	Mortgage Real Estate Investment Trusts (REITs)	40204010	Mortgage REITs
40	Financials	4030	Insurance	403010	Insurance	40301010	Insurance Brokers
40	Financials	4030	Insurance	403010	Insurance	40301020	Life & Health Insurance
40	Financials	4030	Insurance	403010	Insurance	40301030	Multi-line Insurance
40	Financials	4030	Insurance	403010	Insurance	40301040	Property & Casualty Insurance
40	Financials	4030	Insurance	403010	Insurance	40301050	Reinsurance
45	Information Technology	4510	Software & Services				
45	Information Technology	4510	Software & Services	451020	IT Services	45102010	IT Consulting & Other Services
45	Information Technology	4510	Software & Services	451020	IT Services	45102030	Internet Services & Infrastructure
45	Information Technology	4510	Software & Services	451030	Software	45103010	Application Software
45	Information Technology	4510	Software & Services	451030	Software	45103020	Systems Software
45	Information Technology	4520	Technology Hardware & Equipment	452010	Communications Equipment	45201020	Communications Equipment
45	Information Technology	4520	Technology Hardware & Equipment	452020	Technology Hardware, Storage & Peripherals	45202030	Technology Hardware, Storage & Peripherals
45	Information Technology	4520	Technology Hardware & Equipment	452030	Electronic Equipment, Instruments & Components	45203010	Electronic Equipment & Instruments
45	Information Technology	4520	Technology Hardware & Equipment	452030	Electronic Equipment, Instruments & Components	45203015	Electronic Components
45	Information Technology	4520	Technology Hardware & Equipment	452030	Electronic Equipment, Instruments & Components	45203020	Electronic Manufacturing Services
45	Information Technology	4520	Technology Hardware & Equipment	452030	Electronic Equipment, Instruments & Components	45203030	Technology Distributors
45	Information Technology	4530	Semiconductors & Semiconductor Equipment	453010	Semiconductors & Semiconductor Equipment	45301010	Semiconductor Materials & Equipment
45	Information Technology	4530	Semiconductors & Semiconductor Equipment	453010	Semiconductors & Semiconductor Equipment	45301020	Semiconductors
50	Communication Services	5010	Telecommunication Services	501010	Diversified Telecommunication Services	50101010	Alternative Carriers
50	Communication Services	5010	Telecommunication Services	501010	Diversified Telecommunication Services	50101020	Integrated Telecommunication Services
50	Communication Services	5010	Telecommunication Services	501020	Wireless Telecommunication Services	50102010	Wireless Telecommunication Services
50	Communication Services	5020	Media & Entertainment	502010	Media	50201010	Advertising
50	Communication Services	5020	Media & Entertainment	502010	Media	50201020	Broadcasting
50	Communication Services	5020	Media & Entertainment	502010	Media	50201030	Cable & Satellite
50	Communication Services	5020	Media & Entertainment	502010	Media	50201040	Publishing
50	Communication Services	5020	Media & Entertainment	502020	Entertainment	50202010	Movies & Entertainment
50	Communication Services	5020	Media & Entertainment	502020	Entertainment	50202020	Interactive Home Entertainment
50	Communication Services	5020	Media & Entertainment	502030	Interactive Media & Services	50203010	Interactive Media & Services
55	Utilities	5510	Utilities	551010	Electric Utilities	55101010	Electric Utilities
55	Utilities	5510	Utilities	551020	Gas Utilities	55102010	Gas Utilities
55	Utilities	5510	Utilities	551030	Multi-Utilities	55103010	Multi-Utilities
55	Utilities	5510	Utilities	551040	Water Utilities	55104010	Water Utilities
55	Utilities	5510	Utilities	551050	Independent Power and Renewable Electricity Producers	55105010	Independent Power Producers & Energy Traders
55	Utilities	5510	Utilities	551050	Independent Power and Renewable Electricity Producers	55105020	Renewable Electricity
60	Real Estate	6010	Equity Real Estate Investment Trusts (REITs)	601010	Diversified REITs	60101010	Diversified REITs
60	Real Estate	6010	Equity Real Estate Investment Trusts (REITs)	601025	Industrial REITs	60102510	Industrial REITs
60	Real Estate	6010	Equity Real Estate Investment Trusts (REITs)	601030	Hotel & Resort REITs	60103010	Hotel & Resort REITs
60	Real Estate	6010	Equity Real Estate Investment Trusts (REITs)	601040	Office REITs	60104010	Office REITs
60	Real Estate	6010	Equity Real Estate Investment Trusts (REITs)	601050	Health Care REITs	60105010	Health Care REITs
60	Real Estate	6010	Equity Real Estate Investment Trusts (REITs)	601060	Residential REITs	60106010	Multi-Family Residential REITs
60	Real Estate	6010	Equity Real Estate Investment Trusts (REITs)	601060	Residential REITs	60106020	Single-Family Residential REITs
60	Real Estate	6010	Equity Real Estate Investment Trusts (REITs)	601070	Retail REITs	60107010	Retail REITs
60	Real Estate	6010	Equity Real Estate Investment Trusts (REITs)	601080	Specialized REITs	60108010	Other Specialized REITs
60	Real Estate	6010	Equity Real Estate Investment Trusts (REITs)	601080	Specialized REITs	60108020	Self-Storage REITs
60	Real Estate	6010	Equity Real Estate Investment Trusts (REITs)	601080	Specialized REITs	60108030	Telecom Tower REITs
60	Real Estate	6010	Equity Real Estate Investment Trusts (REITs)	601080	Specialized REITs	60108040	Timber REITs
60	Real Estate	6010	Equity Real Estate Investment Trusts (REITs)	601080	Specialized REITs	60108050	Data Center REITs
60	Real Estate	6020	Real Estate Management & Development	602010	Real Estate Management & Development	60201010	Diversified Real Estate Activities
60	Real Estate	6020	Real Estate Management & Development	602010	Real Estate Management & Development	60201020	Real Estate Operating Companies
60	Real Estate	6020	Real Estate Management & Development	602010	Real Estate Management & Development	60201030	Real Estate Development
60	Real Estate	6020	Real Estate Management & Development	602010	Real Estate Management & Development	60201040	Real Estate Services

Per the MSCI World index, Information Technology is the biggest sector, with 32% of world capitalisation.

== Revisions ==
The classification standard is regularly updated by S&P, Dow Jones Indices and MSCI. Numerous changes over the years have resulted in the addition, deletion, or redefinition of various sub-industries, industries, or industry groups. Since 1999, there have been two revisions at the sector level:

- In 2016, the real estate industry group (with the exception of mortgage REITs) was moved out of the financials sector to a newly created real estate sector.
- In 2018, the telecommunication services sector was renamed communication services. The sector was expanded to include media and entertainment companies previously in the consumer discretionary sector, as well as interactive media and services companies from the information technology sector.
- In March 2023, several revisions were made.

== See also ==
- Industry Classification Benchmark
- International Standard Industrial Classification
- North American Industry Classification System
- Standard Industrial Classification
- Thomson Reuters Business Classification
