= Statistical Classification of Economic Activities in the European Community =

European Union industry classification system

The Statistical Classification of Economic Activities in the European Community, commonly referred to as NACE (for the French term "nomenclature statistique des activités économiques dans la Communauté européenne"), is the industry standard classification system used in the European Union. The current version is revision 2.1 and was established by Commission Delegated Regulation (EU) 2023/137 of 10 October 2022 amending Regulation (EC) No 1893/2006. This revision takes effect from 2025. It is the European implementation of the UN classification ISIC, revision 5.

There is a correspondence between NACE and United Nations' International Standard Industrial Classification of all Economic Activities.

The NACE system is similar to the SIC and NAICS systems in function.

- Standard Industrial Classification
- North American Industry Classification System

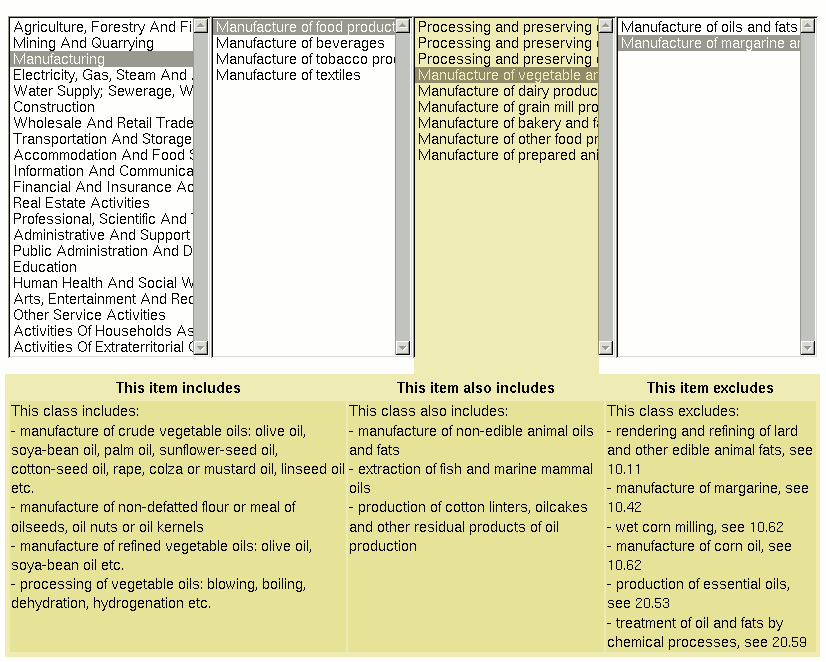
a screenshot of NACE being used in a computer program

NACE uses four hierarchical levels:

- Level 1: 22 sections identified by alphabetical letters A to V;
- Level 2: 88 divisions identified by two-digit numerical codes (01 to 99);
- Level 3: 272 groups identified by three-digit numerical codes (01.1 to 99.0);
- Level 4: 615 classes identified by four-digit numerical codes (01.11 to 99.00).

The first four digits of the code, which is the first four levels of the classification system, are the same in all European countries. National implementations may introduce additional levels. The fifth digit might vary from country to country and further digits are sometimes placed by suppliers of databases.

== Level 1 Codes ==
The 22 Level 1 codes are:

Statistical Classification of Economic Activities in the European Community Rev. 2.1 (2023): Level 1 Codes
Code	Economic Area
A	Agriculture, Forestry and Fishing
B	Mining and Quarrying
C	Manufacturing
D	Electricity, Gas, Steam and Air Conditioning Supply
E	Water Supply; Sewerage, Waste Management and Remediation Activities
F	Construction
G	Wholesale and Retail Trade; Repair of Motor Vehicles and Motorcycles
H	Transportation and Storage
I	Accommodation and Food Service Activities
J	Publishing, Broadcasting, and Content Production and Distribution Activities
K	Telecommunication, Computer Programming, Consulting, Computing Infrastructure, and other Information Service Activities
L	Financial and Insurance Activities
M	Real Estate Activities
N	Professional, Scientific and Technical Activities
O	Administrative and Support Service Activities
P	Public Administration and Defence; Compulsory Social Security
Q	Education
R	Human Health and Social Work Activities
S	Arts, Sports and Recreation
T	Other Service Activities
U	Activities of Households as Employers; Undifferentiated Goods and Services Producing Activities of Households for Own Use
V	Activities of Extraterritorial Organisations and Bodies
