= Outline of industry =

Overview of and topical guide to industry

The following outline is provided as an overview of and topical guide to industry:

Industry, in economics and economic geography, refers to the production of an economic good or service within an economy.

== Essence of industry ==
- Business, practice of making one's living or making money by producing or buying and selling products (such as goods and services), i.e. any activity or enterprise entered into for profit.
- Cottage Industry, an industry—primarily manufacturing—which includes many producers, working from their homes, and originally was often organized through the putting-out system
- Heavy industry, an industry that involves one or more characteristics such as large and heavy products; large and heavy equipment and facilities (such as heavy equipment, large machine tools, huge buildings and large-scale infrastructure); or complex or numerous processes.
- Light industry, an industry that usually is less capital-intensive than heavy industries and is more consumer-oriented than business-oriented, as they typically produce smaller consumer goods
- Manufacturing, creation or production of goods with the help of equipment, labor, machines, tools, and chemical or biological processing or formulation. It is the essence of the secondary sector of the economy.

In some cases, industries can be harmful, such as those where harmful waste chemicals are dumped in bodies of water, or even those where pesticides and similar inadvertently leak into water sources.

== Industry sectors ==
- Primary sector of the economy (the raw materials industry)
- Secondary sector of the economy (manufacturing and construction)
- Tertiary sector of the economy (the "service industry")
- Quaternary sector of the economy (information services)
- Quinary sector of the economy (humanitarian services)

== Major industries ==
=== Agriculture ===
- Fishing industry, any industry or activity that takes, cultures, processes, preserves, stores, transports, markets or sells fish or fish products.
- Horticulture industry, production, processing and shipping of and the market for fruits and vegetables
- Tobacco industry, persons and companies who are engaged in the growth, preparation for sale, shipment, advertisement, and distribution of tobacco and tobacco-related products
- Wood industry, industry concerned with forestry, logging, timber trade, and the production of primary forest products and wood products (e.g. furniture) and secondary products like wood pulp for the pulp and paper industry

=== Manufacturing ===
- Aerospace industry, involved in the various aspects of designing, building, testing, selling, and maintaining aircraft, aircraft parts, missiles, rockets, or spacecraft.
- Automotive industry, involved in the design, development, manufacturing, marketing, selling, repairing, and modification of motor vehicles.
- Chemical industry, involved in the development and production of industrial, specialty and other chemicals converted from raw materials (oil, natural gas, air, water, metals, and minerals)
  - Pharmaceutical industry, involved in the discovery, development, production, and marketing of pharmaceutical goods such as medications for curing or preventing disease or for alleviating symptoms of illness or injury.
- Construction industry, involved in the planning, building, renovation, and maintenance of buildings, infrastructure, and industrial facilities.
- Defense industry, engaged in the development, production, and sale of weapons, military technology, and defense-related services.
  - Arms industry
- Electric power industry
- Electronics industry
  - Computer industry
  - Semiconductor industry
- Energy industry
- Food industry
  - Drink industry
- Industrial robot industry
- Low technology industry
- Meat
  - Meat packing
- Mining
- Oil and gas
- Petroleum industry
  - Oil shale
- Pulp and paper industry
- Steel industry
- Shipbuilding industry
- Textile industry
- Water industry

=== Services ===
- Broadcasting
  - Radio
  - Television
- Creative
  - Advertising
  - Fashion
  - Floral
- Culture industry
- Education industry
- Entertainment industry
  - Music industry
  - Film industry
  - Gambling industry
  - Video game industry
- Financial services industry
  - Insurance industry
- Healthcare industry
- Hospitality industry
- Information industry
- Leisure industry
- Mass media
  - Broadcasting
  - Internet
  - News media
  - Publishing
  - Entertainment
- Professional services
- Real estate industry
- Retail industry
- Sport industry
- Technology
  - Software industry
- Telecommunications
  - Telecommunications industry
- Transport industry

== History of industry ==
- Industrial history
- Industrial Revolution
  - Second Industrial Revolution
  - Third Industrial Revolution
  - Fourth Industrial Revolution

== General industrial concepts ==
- Air pollution
- Big business
- Colin Clark's Sector Model
- Economies of scale
- Employment tribunal
- Externality
- Global Industry Classification Standard
- Industrial action
- Industrial Age
- Industrial and organizational psychology
- Industrial and production engineering
- Industrial applicability
- Industrial archaeology
- Industrial coating
- Industrial control system
- Industrial data processing
- Industrial deconcentration
- Industrial democracy
- Industrial design
- Industrial design right
- Industrial disasters
- Industrial district
- Industrial ecology
  - Industrial symbiosis
- Industrial engineering
- Industrial espionage
- Industrial gas
- Industrial internet of things
- Industrial mineral
- Industrial organization
- Industrial park
- Industrial PC
- Industrial policy
- Industrial processes
- Industrial production index
- Industrial railway
- Industrial society
  - Post-industrial society
  - Pre-industrial society
- Industrial sociology
- Industrial unionism
- Industrial waste
- Industrialist
- Industrialization
- Industry analyst
- Industry Structure Model
- Labor revolt
- Machine tooling
- Machining
- Market research
- Mass production
- Materials science
- Occupational injury
- Occupational noise
- Pricing
- Raw material
- Robber baron (industrialist)
- Science park
- Seven Wonders of the Industrial World
- Standard Industrial Classification
- Trade association

== Industrial output ==
- Input–output model
- List of countries by GDP sector composition

== See also ==
- Capitalism
- Socialism
- List of research parks
- List of technology centers
- North American Industry Classification System
