= Industrial society =

Society driven by the use of technology to enable mass production

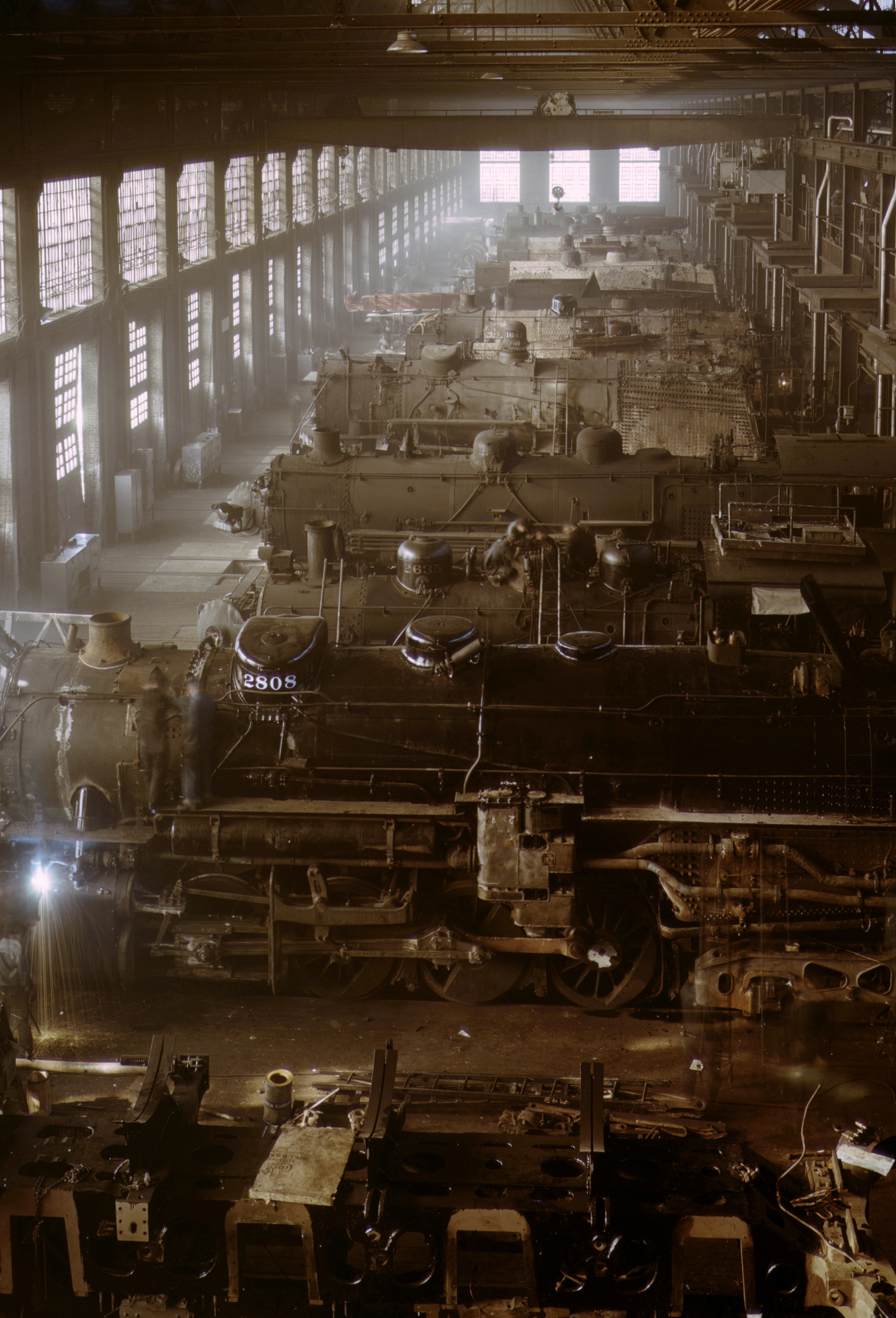
Chicago and Northwestern railroad locomotive shop in the early 20th century

In sociology, an industrial society is a society driven by the use of technology and machinery to enable mass production, supporting a large population with a high capacity for division of labour. Such a structure developed in the Western world in the period of time following the Industrial Revolution, and replaced the agrarian societies of the pre-modern, pre-industrial age. Industrial societies are generally mass societies, and may be succeeded by an information society. They are often contrasted with traditional societies.

Industrial societies use external energy sources, such as fossil fuels, to increase the rate and scale of production. The production of food is shifted to large commercial farms where the products of industry, such as combine harvesters and fossil fuel–based fertilizers, are used to decrease required human labor while increasing production. No longer needed for the production of food, excess labor is moved into these factories where mechanization is utilized to further increase efficiency. As populations grow, and mechanization is further refined, often to the level of automation, many workers shift to expanding service industries.

Industrial society makes urbanization desirable, in part so that workers can be closer to centers of production, and the service industry can provide labor to workers and those that benefit financially from them, in exchange for a piece of production profits with which they can buy goods. This leads to the rise of very large cities and surrounding suburb areas with a high rate of economic activity.

These urban centers require the input of external energy sources in order to overcome the diminishing returns of agricultural consolidation, due partially to the lack of nearby arable land, associated transportation and storage costs, and are otherwise unsustainable. This makes the reliable availability of the needed energy resources high priority in industrial government policies.

== Industrial development ==
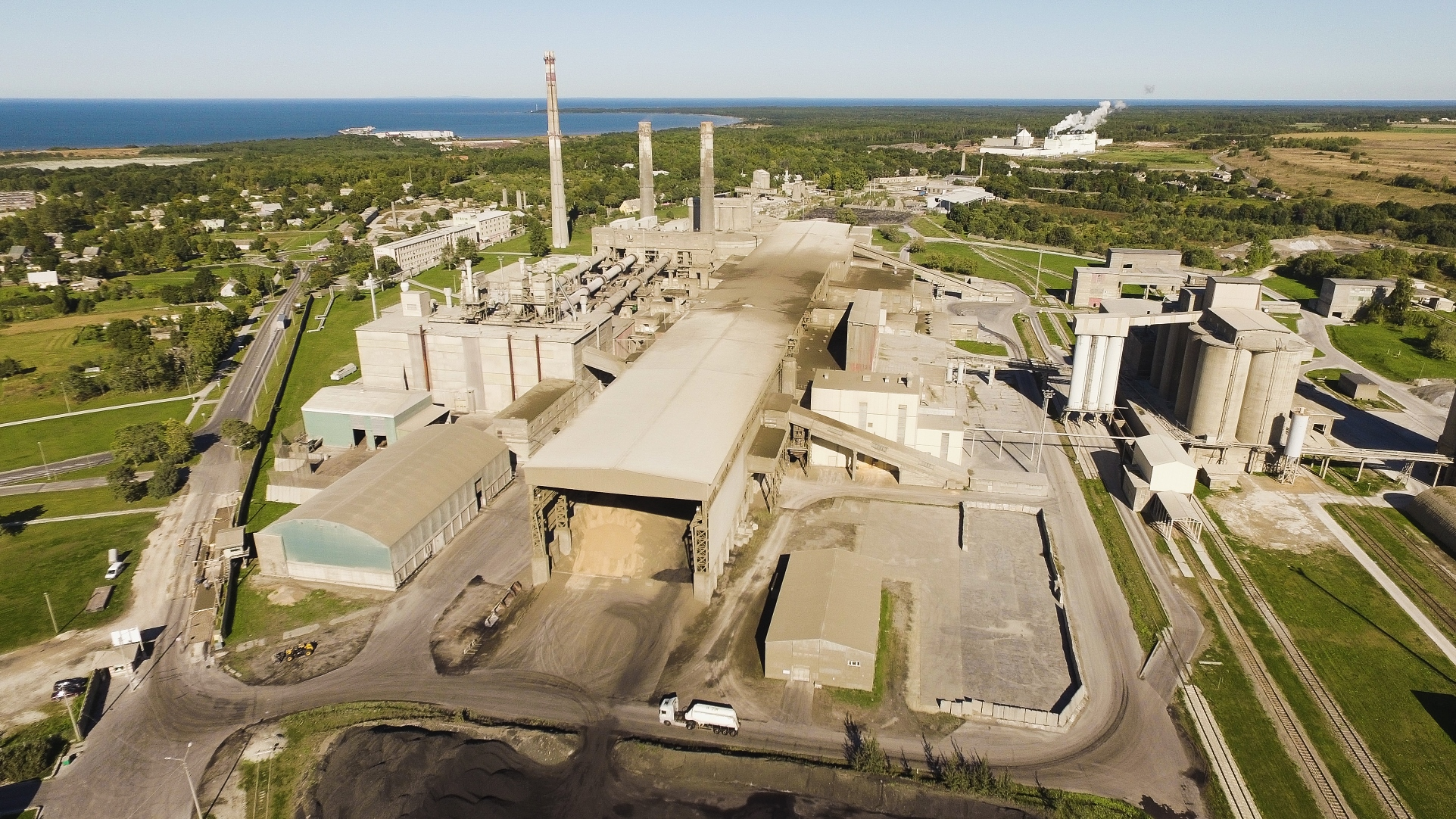
A factory, a traditional symbol of the industrial development (a cement factory in Kunda, Estonia)

Prior to the Industrial Revolution in Europe and North America, followed by further industrialization throughout the world in the 20th century, most economies were largely agrarian. Basics were often made within the household and most other manufacturing was carried out in smaller workshops by artisans with limited specialization or machinery.

In Europe during the late Middle Ages, artisans in many towns formed guilds to self-regulate their trades and collectively pursue their business interests. Economic historian Sheilagh Ogilvie has suggested the guilds further restrained the quality and productivity of manufacturing. There is some evidence, however, that even in ancient times, large economies such as the Roman Empire or Chinese Han dynasty had developed factories for more centralized production in certain industries.

With the Industrial Revolution, the manufacturing sector became a major part of European and North American economies, both in terms of labor and production, contributing possibly a third of all economic activity. Along with rapid advances in technology, such as steam power and mass steel production, the new manufacturing drastically reconfigured previously mercantile and feudal economies. Even today, industrial manufacturing is significant to many developed and semi-developed economies.

== Deindustrialisation ==
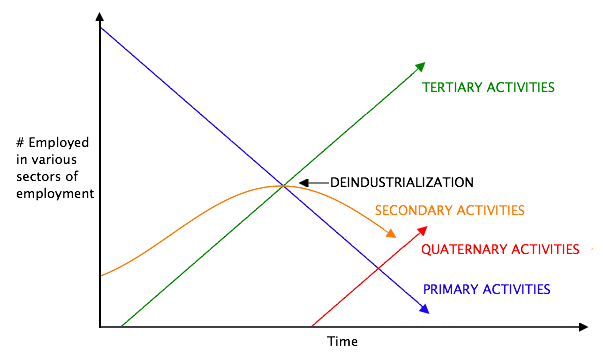
Colin Clark's sector model of an economy undergoing technological change. In later stages, the Quaternary sector of the economy grows.

Historically certain manufacturing industries have gone into a decline due to various economic factors, including the development of replacement technology or the loss of competitive advantage. An example of the former is the decline in carriage manufacturing when the automobile was mass-produced.

A recent trend has been the migration of prosperous, industrialized nations towards a post-industrial society. This has come with a major shift in labor and production away from manufacturing and towards the service sector, a process dubbed tertiarization. Additionally, since the late 20th century, rapid changes in communication and information technology (sometimes called an information revolution) have allowed sections of some economies to specialize in a quaternary sector of knowledge and information-based services. For these and other reasons, in a post-industrial society, manufacturers can and often do relocate their industrial operations to lower-cost regions in a process known as off-shoring.

Measurements of manufacturing industries outputs and economic effect are not historically stable. Traditionally, success has been measured in the number of jobs created. The reduced number of employees in the manufacturing sector has been assumed to result from a decline in the competitiveness of the sector, or the introduction of the lean manufacturing process.

Related to this change is the upgrading of the quality of the product being manufactured. While it is possible to produce a low-technology product with low-skill labour, the ability to manufacture high-technology products well is dependent on a highly skilled staff.

== Industrial policy ==
Today, as industry is an important part of most societies and nations, many governments will have at least some role in planning and regulating industry. This can include issues such as industrial pollution, financing, vocational education, and labour law.

== Industrial labour ==
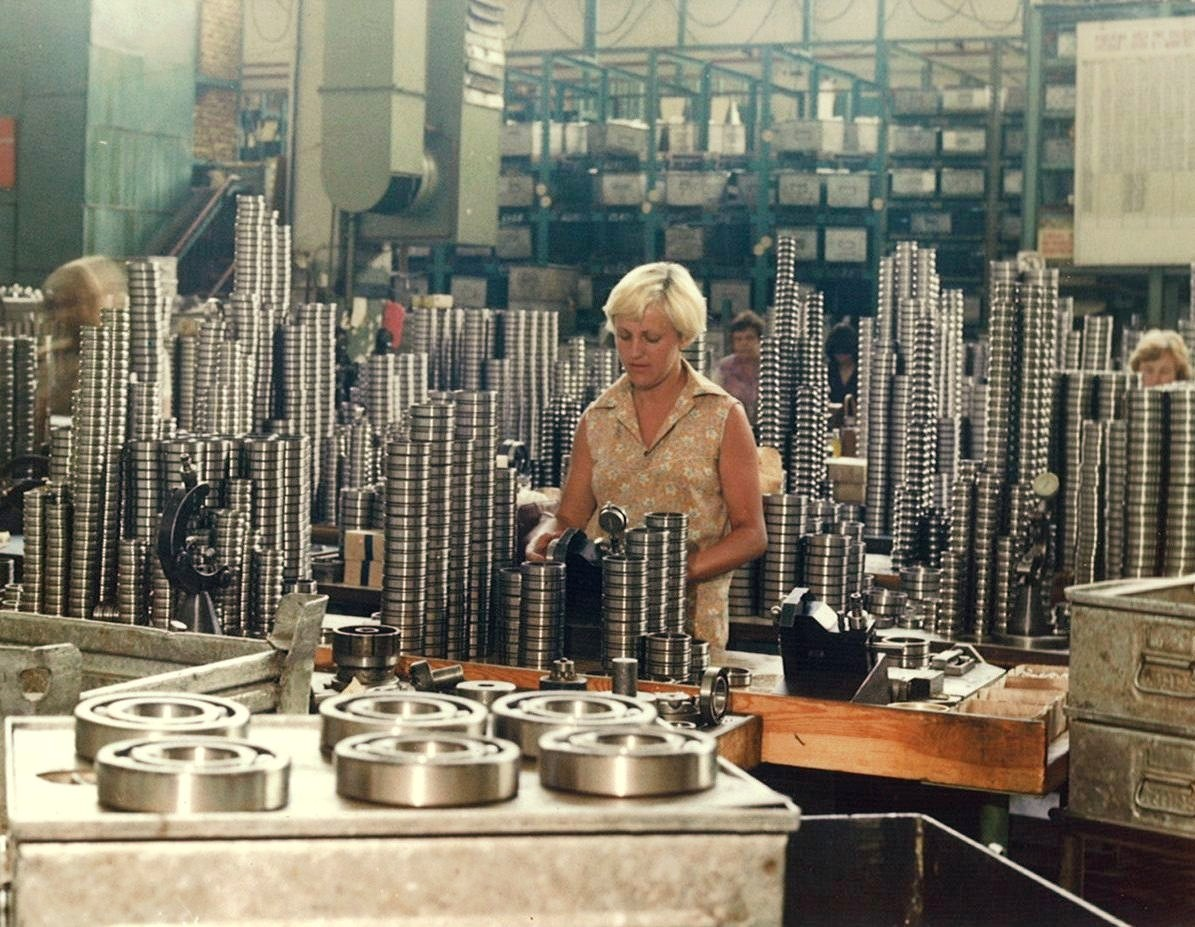
An industrial worker amidst heavy steel components (KINEX BEARINGS, Bytča, Slovakia, c. 1995–2000)

In an industrial society, industry employs a major part of the population. This occurs typically in the manufacturing sector. A labour union is an organization of workers who have banded together to achieve common goals in key areas such as wages, hours, and other working conditions. The trade union, through its leadership, bargains with the employer on behalf of other union members and negotiates labour contracts with employers. This movement first rose among industrial workers.

== Effects on slavery ==
Ancient Mediterranean cultures relied on slavery throughout their economy. While serfdom largely supplanted the practice in Europe during the Middle Ages, several European powers reintroduced slavery extensively in the early modern period, particularly for the harshest labor in their colonies. The Industrial revolution played a central role in the later abolition of slavery, partly because domestic manufacturing's new economic dominance undercut interests in the slave trade. Additionally, the new industrial methods required a complex division of labor with less worker supervision, which may have been incompatible with forced labor.

== War ==
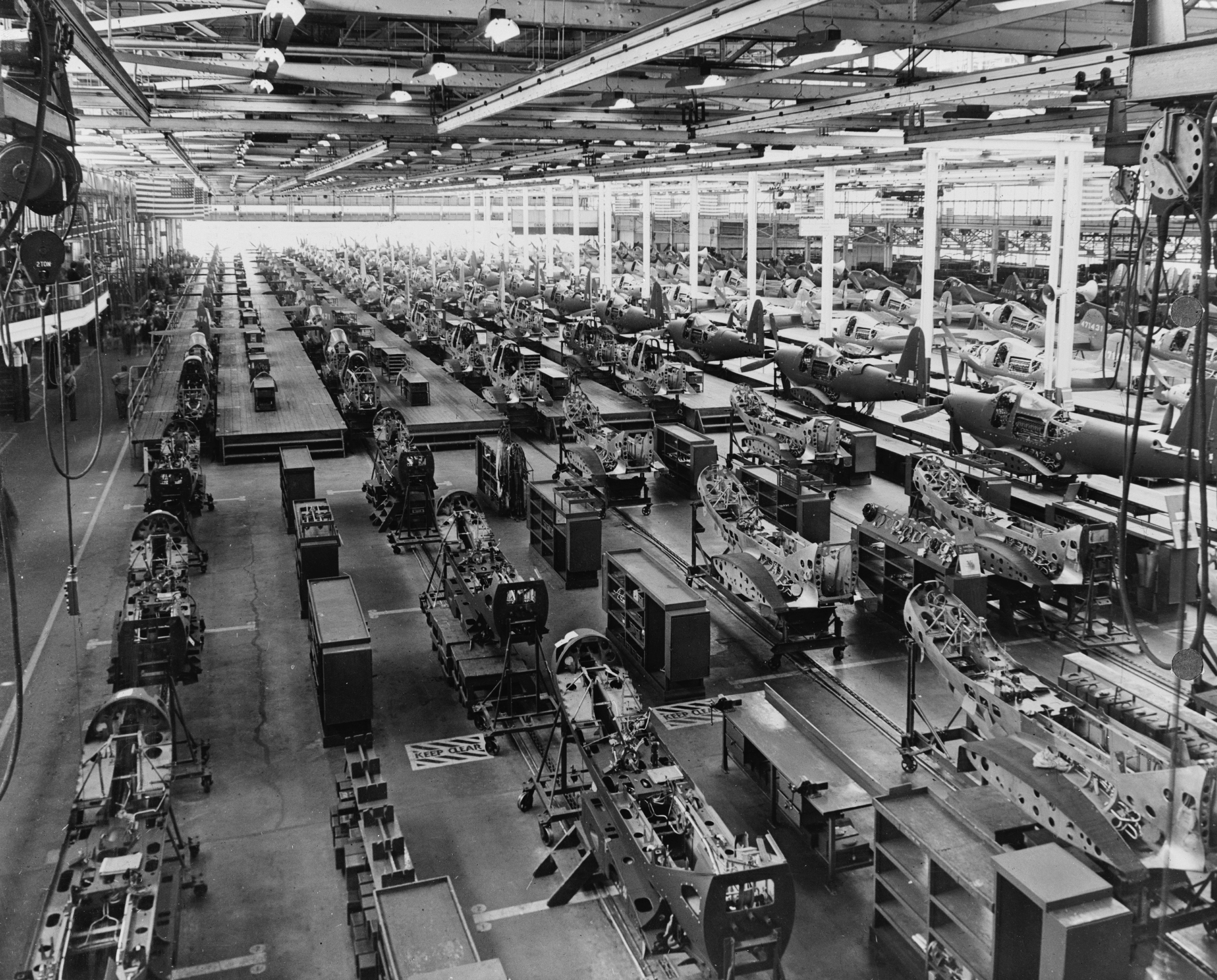
The assembly plant of the Bell Aircraft Corporation (Wheatfield, New York, United States, 1944) producing P-39 Airacobra fighters

The Industrial Revolution changed warfare, with mass-produced weaponry and supplies, machine-powered transportation, mobilization, the total war concept and weapons of mass destruction. Early instances of industrial warfare were the Crimean War and the American Civil War, but its full potential showed during the world wars. See also military-industrial complex, arms industries, military industry and modern warfare.

== Use in 20th century social science and politics ==
“Industrial society” took on a more specific meaning after World War II in the context of the Cold War, the internationalization of sociology through organizations like UNESCO, and the spread of American industrial relations to Europe. The cementation of the Soviet Union’s position as a world power inspired reflection on whether the sociological association of highly-developed industrial economies with capitalism required updating. The transformation of capitalist societies in Europe and the United States to state-managed, regulated welfare capitalism, often with significant sectors of nationalized industry, also contributed to the impression that they might be evolving beyond capitalism, or toward some sort of “convergence” common to all “types” of industrial societies, whether capitalist or communist. State management, automation, bureaucracy, institutionalized collective bargaining, and the rise of the tertiary sector were taken as common markers of industrial society.

The “industrial society” paradigm of the 1950s and 1960s was strongly marked by the unprecedented economic growth in Europe and the United States after World War II, and drew heavily on the work of economists like Colin Clark, John Kenneth Galbraith, W.W. Rostow, and Jean Fourastié. The fusion of sociology with development economics gave the industrial society paradigm strong resemblances to modernization theory, which achieved major influence in social science in the context of postwar decolonization and the development of post-colonial states.

The French sociologist Raymond Aron, who gave the most developed definition to the concept of “industrial society” in the 1950s, used the term as a comparative method to identify common features of the Western capitalist and Soviet-style communist societies. Other sociologists, including Daniel Bell, Reinhard Bendix, Ralf Dahrendorf, Georges Friedmann, Seymour Martin Lipset, and Alain Touraine, used similar ideas in their own work, though with sometimes very different definitions and emphases. The principal notions of industrial-society theory were also commonly expressed in the ideas of reformists in European social-democratic parties who advocated a turn away from Marxism and an end to revolutionary politics.

Because of its association with non-Marxist modernization theory and American anticommunist organizations like the Congress for Cultural Freedom, “industrial society” theory was often criticized by left-wing sociologists and Communists as a liberal ideology that aimed to justify the postwar status quo and undermine opposition to capitalism. However, some left-wing thinkers like André Gorz, Serge Mallet, Herbert Marcuse, and the Frankfurt School used aspects of industrial society theory in their critiques of capitalism.

== Selected bibliography of industrial society theory ==
- Adorno, Theodor. "Late Capitalism or Industrial Society?" (1968)
- Aron, Raymond. Dix-huit leçons sur la société industrielle. Paris: Gallimard, 1961.
- Aron, Raymond. La lutte des classes: nouvelles leçons sur les sociétés industrielles. Paris: Gallimard, 1964.
- Bell, Daniel. The End of Ideology: On the Exhaustion of Political Ideas in the Fifties. New York: Free Press, 1960.
- Dahrendorf, Ralf. Class and Class Conflict in Industrial Society. Stanford: Stanford University Press, 1959.
- Gorz, André. Stratégie ouvrière et néo-capitalisme. Paris: Seuil, 1964.
- Friedmann, Georges. Le Travail en miettes. Paris: Gallimard, 1956.
- Kaczynski, Theodore J. Industrial Society and Its Future. Berkeley, CA: Jolly Roger Press, 1995.
- Kerr, Clark, et al. Industrialism and Industrial Man. Oxford: Oxford University Press, 1960.
- Lipset, Seymour Martin. Political Man: The Social Bases of Politics. Garden City, NJ: Doubleday, 1959.
- Marcuse, Herbert. One-Dimensional Man: Studies in the Ideology of Advanced Industrial Society. Boston: Beacon Press, 1964.
- Touraine, Alain. Sociologie de l'action. Paris: Seuil, 1965.
- Bell, Daniel. 'The Coming of Post-Industrial Society. A Venture in Social Forecasting'. New York: Basic Books, 1973.

== See also ==
- Developed country
- Food industry
- Industrialization
- North–South divide
- Post-industrial society
- Western world
- Industrial Revolution
- Newly industrialized country
- Mechanization
- Dystopian future
