= Economic sector =

Economical term

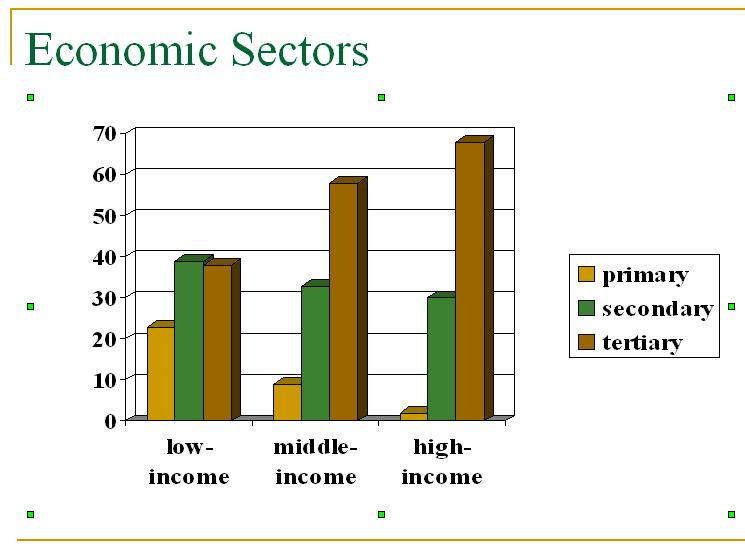
Percentages of a country's economy made up by different sectors. Countries with higher levels of socio-economic development tend to have proportionally less of their economies operating in the primary and secondary sectors and more emphasis on the tertiary sector. The less developed countries exhibit the inverse pattern.

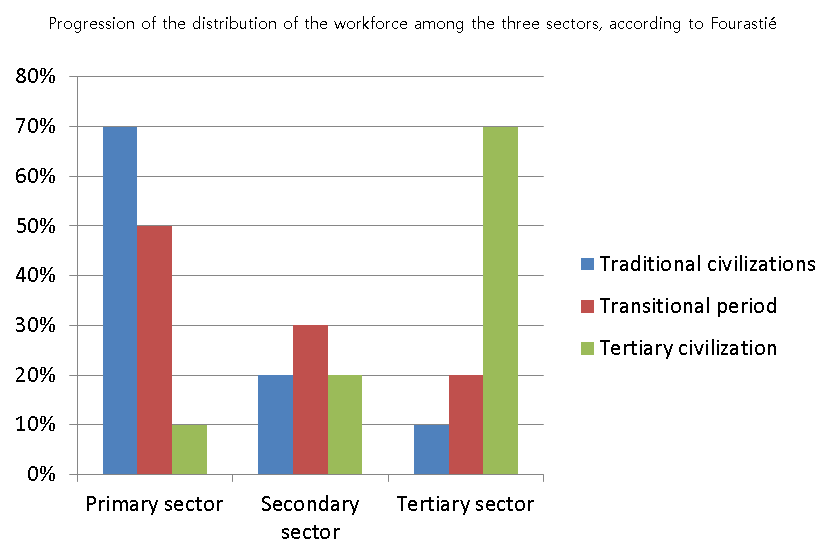
Three sectors according to Fourastié

Colin Clark's sector model

An economic sector is a part of an economy that includes similar economic activities and industries. One classical breakdown of economic activity distinguishes three sectors:

- Primary: involves the retrieval and production of raw materials, such as corn, coal, wood or iron. Miners, farmers and fishermen are all workers in the primary sector.
- Secondary: involves the transformation of raw materials or intermediate goods into goods, as in steel into cars, or textiles into clothing. Builders and dressmakers work in the secondary sector.
- Tertiary: involves the supplying of services to consumers and businesses, such as babysitting, cinemas or banking. Shopkeepers and accountants work in the tertiary sector.

In the 20th century, economists began to suggest that traditional tertiary services could be further distinguished from "quaternary" and "quinary" service sectors. Economic activity in the hypothetical quaternary sector comprises information- and knowledge-based services, while quinary services include industries related to human services and hospitality.

To have a more comprehensive description of the economy it will be necessary to start defining the foundational sector: the household production sector. It involves production of goods and services essential for the production and maintenance of human life. Currently mostly produced by unpaid work.

Economic theories divide economic sectors further into economic industries.

== Historic evolution ==
An economy may include several sectors that evolved in successive phases:

- The ancient economy built mainly on the basis of subsistence farming.
- The Industrial Revolution lessened the role of subsistence farming, converting land-use to more extensive and monocultural forms of agriculture over the last three centuries. Economic growth took place mostly in the mining, construction and manufacturing industries.
- In the economies of modern consumer societies, services, finance, and technology—the knowledge economy—play an increasingly significant role.

Even in modern times, developing countries tend to rely more on the first two sectors, in contrast to developed countries.

== By ownership ==
An economy can also be divided along different lines:

- Public sector or state sector
- Private sector or privately run businesses
- Voluntary sector

== See also ==
- Three-sector theory
- Jean Fourastié
- Industry classification
  - International Standard Industrial Classification
  - Industry Classification Benchmark
  - North American Industry Classification System – a sample application of sector-oriented analysis
- Division of labour
- Economic development
