= Alfred Edward Lewis =

English banker and economist (1868-1940)

Sir Alfred Lewis
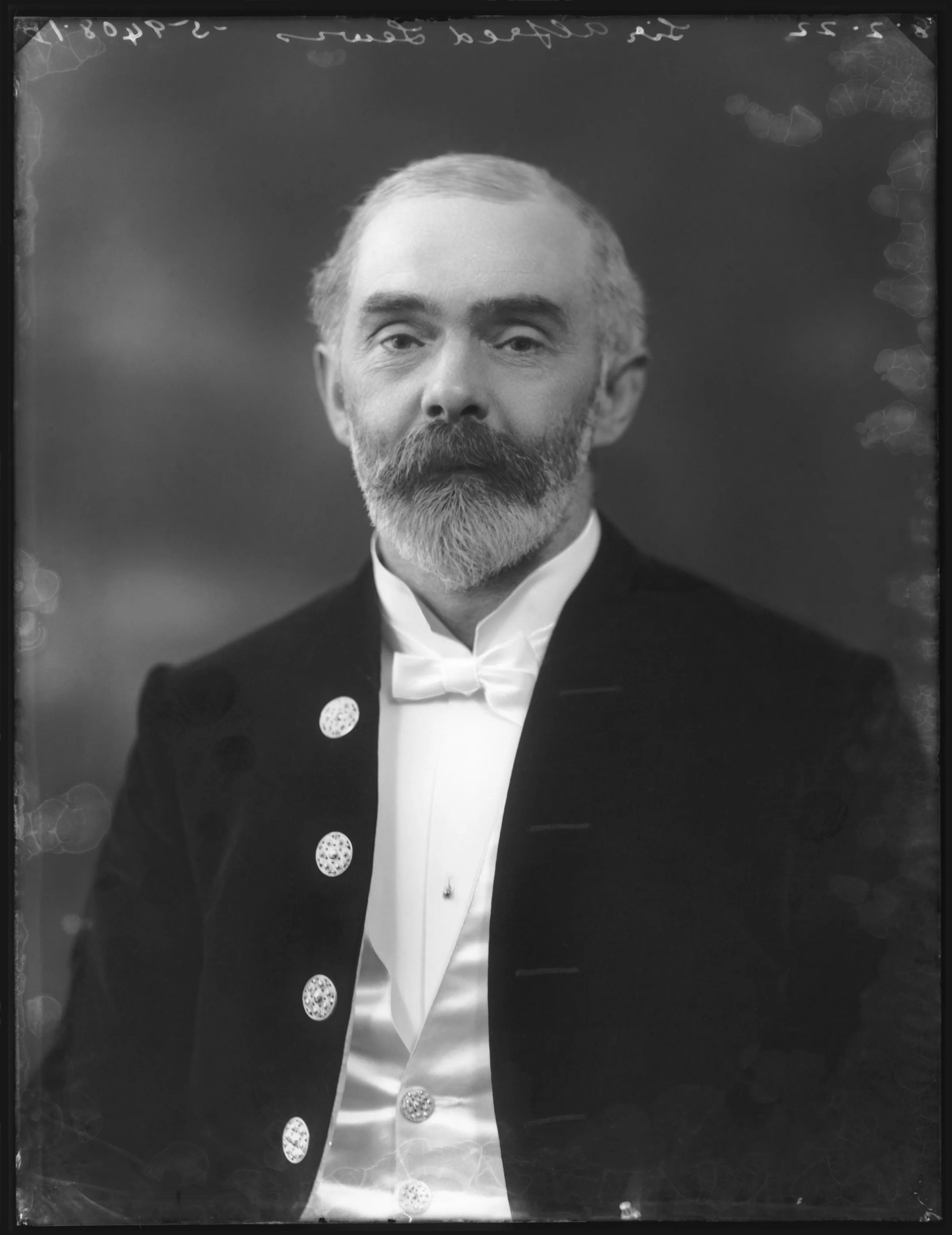
- Lewis in 1922
- Born: Alfred Edward Lewis; August 2, 1868; Birmingham, England
- Died: January 27, 1940 (aged 71); Lower Kingswood, Surrey, England
- Education: King Edward's School, Birmingham
- Occupations: Banker and economist
- Known for: Member of the United Kingdom's National Economic Advisory Council
- Spouse: May Roberts (m. 1897)
- Children: 3

Sir Alfred Edward Lewis (1868 - 1940) was a British banker and economist who rose to being a member of the United Kingdom government National Economic Advisory Council.

== Early life ==
The son of John Lewis, a Welsh Calvinist Methodist minister and Elizabeth (nee Davies), he was born in Birmingham on 2nd August 1868, and educated at King Edward's School, Birmingham.

== Career ==
He started work at the Birmingham and Midlands bank in 1884 (aged 16), becoming assistant-manager of the New Street branch of the Midland bank. Becoming general manager of the Bradford District bank in 1910, he rose to be general manager of the National Provincial Bank after its takeover of the Bradford District Bank in 1919. He became Deputy Chairman of the National Provincial Bank in 1934.

He served on the Council of the National Library of Wales, and was a member of the National Economic Advisory Council.

== Recognition ==
He was made an honorary Doctor of Laws of the Universities of Birmingham (1930) and Wales (1935).

He was knighted in 1921, and made a Knight Commander of the Order of the British Empire in the 1931 New Year Honours.

The 'Sir Alfred Lewis Prize', for the best final-year student who has completed a single honours course in Biological Science, is awarded by Bangor University in his name.

== Family ==
He married May Roberts of Leeds in 1897, and they had one son, Edward Roberts and at least two daughters, Nancy Roberts and Freda Elizabeth. His son, Edward Roberts Lewis, went on to transform Decca from making gramophones to producing records.

His brother, Hugh Davies Lewis (1866 - 1937) became general manager of the Liverpool & London & Globe Insurance Company, and general manager of the Japan Assurance Company set up in the wake of the Great Kantō Earthquake of 1923. He was a Governor of the London School of Economics and was High Sheriff of Anglesey in 1934-35.
