= Encouraged Industry Catalogue =

The Encouraged Industry Catalogue is a document produced by the government of the People's Republic of China (PRC) and used to direct foreign investment in and international trade with mainland China. It classifies various industries into four categorised as Encouraged, Permitted, Restricted and Prohibited, which has subsequent effects on foreign firms wishing to operate in such sectors.

Encouraged industries generally receive favourable tax treatment whilst those in the permitted category are treated on a quite neutral basis. If an industry is restricted, foreign investment is usually limited to a minority shareholding in a joint venture whilst prohibited industries cannot have any form of foreign investment at all.

On 28 December 2020, the National Development and Reform Commission (NDRC) and the Ministry of Commerce (MOFCOM) published the 2020 version of the Catalogue, which came into effect on 27 January 2021, replacing the 2019 version.

== Encouraged industries ==
Foreign investment is encouraged in the following industries:

- Advanced manufacturing industries.
- Production-oriented service industries.
- Regional advanced industries in the central, western, and northeastern regions.

The favourable treatment for encouraged industries include:

- Tariff exemptions on imported equipment.
- Access to preferential land prices and looser regulation of land uses.
- The land transfer reserve price can be 70% of the national minimum price for industrial land.
- Corporate income tax rate can be reduced to 15%.

== See also ==
- Economy of China
