= Service industries =

Type of industry

Service industries are those not directly concerned with the production of physical goods (such as agriculture and manufacturing).

Some service industries, including transportation, wholesale trade and retail trade are part of the supply chain delivering goods produced in the agricultural and manufacturing sectors to final consumers. Other services are provided directly to consumers: these include health care, education, information services, legal services, financial services, and public administration.

The service sector accounts for around 70-80 per cent of employment in modern economies.

== Service industries in the three-sector model ==
In the three-sector model of the economy, widely used in the 20th century, the service sector was assigned the role of transporting, distributing and selling goods produced in the manufacturing (secondary sector), and was therefore described as the tertiary sector of the economy.

However, the majority of service employment is now found in activities that are not directly related to the production and distribution of physical goods. In the context of the three-sector model, these are referred to as the quaternary and quinary sectors.

An economy in which most economic activity is unrelated to physical goods production may be described as post-industrial.

== See also ==
- Industrial society
- Information society
- Information revolution
- Knowledge economy
