= Three-sector model =

Model in economics

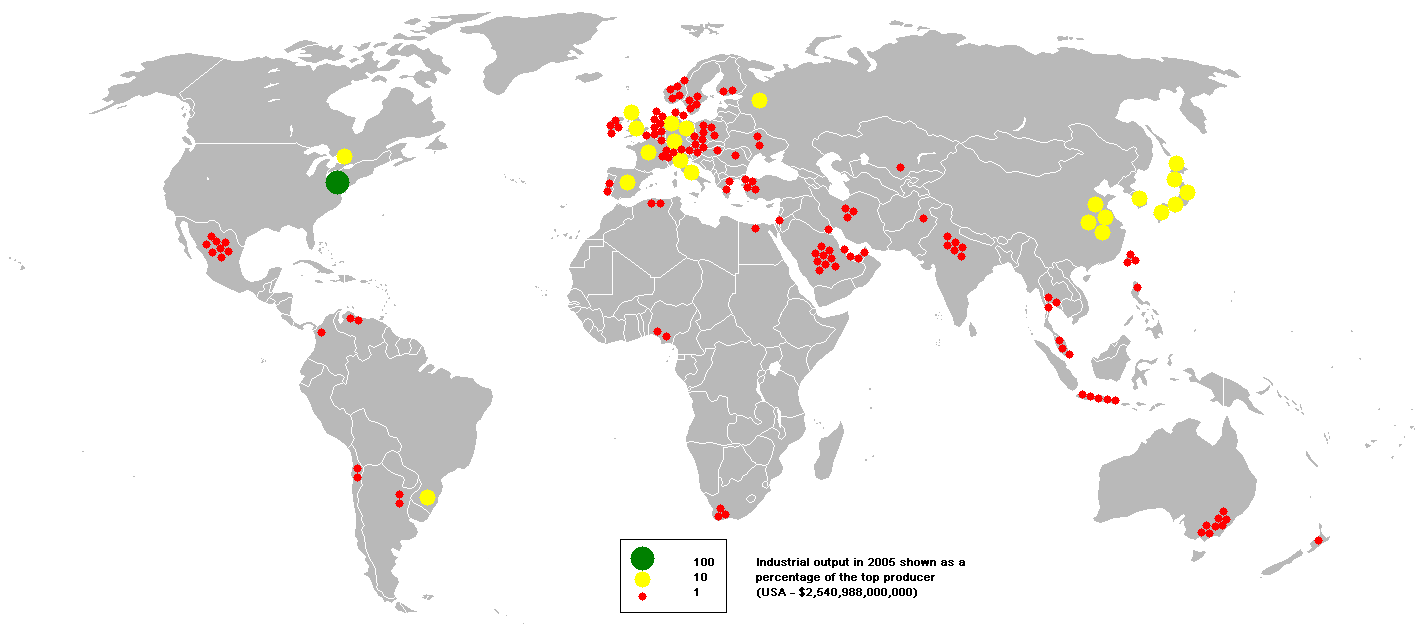
Industrial output in 2005

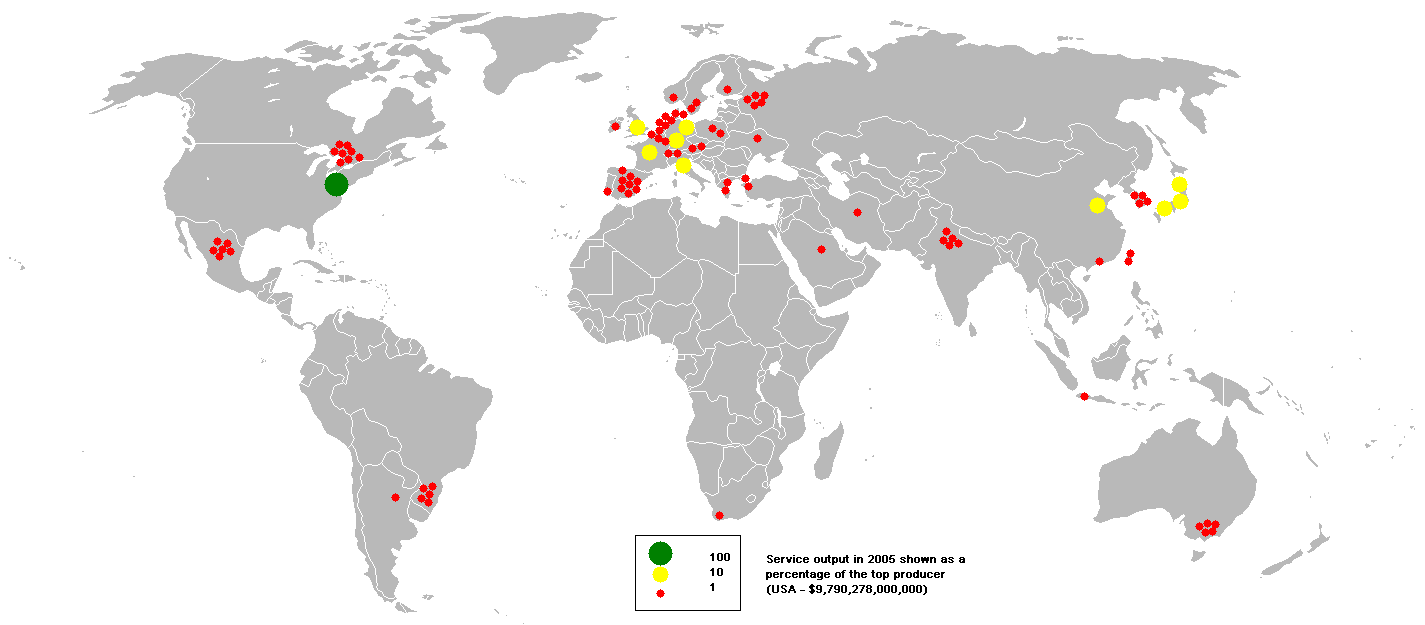
Service output in 2005

In economics, the three-sector model divides economies into three sectors of activity: extraction of raw materials (primary), manufacturing (secondary), and service industries which exist to facilitate the transport, distribution and sale of goods produced in the secondary sector (tertiary). The model was developed by Allan Fisher, Colin Clark, and Jean Fourastié in the first half of the 20th century, and is a representation of an industrial economy. It has been criticised as inappropriate as a representation of the economy in the 21st century.

According to the three-sector model, the main focus of an economy's activity shifts from the primary through the secondary and finally to the tertiary sector. Countries with a low per capita income are in an early state of development; the main part of their national income is achieved through production in the primary sector. Countries in a more advanced state of development, with a medium national income, generate their income mostly in the secondary sector. In highly developed countries with a high income, the tertiary sector dominates the total output of the economy.

The rise of the post-industrial economy in which an increasing proportion of economic activity is not directly related to physical goods has led some economists to expand the model by adding a fourth quaternary or fifth quinary sectors, while others have ceased to use the model.

== Structural transformation according to Fourastié ==
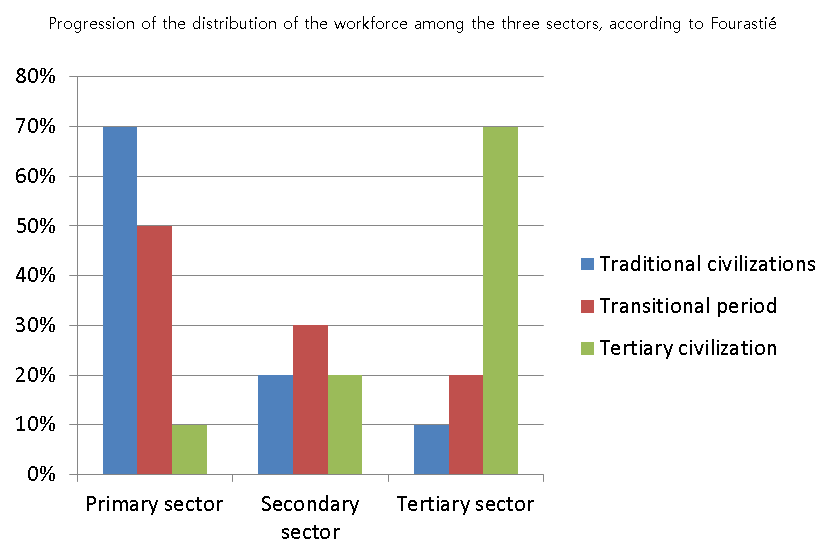
Three sectors according to Fourastié

Clark's sector model

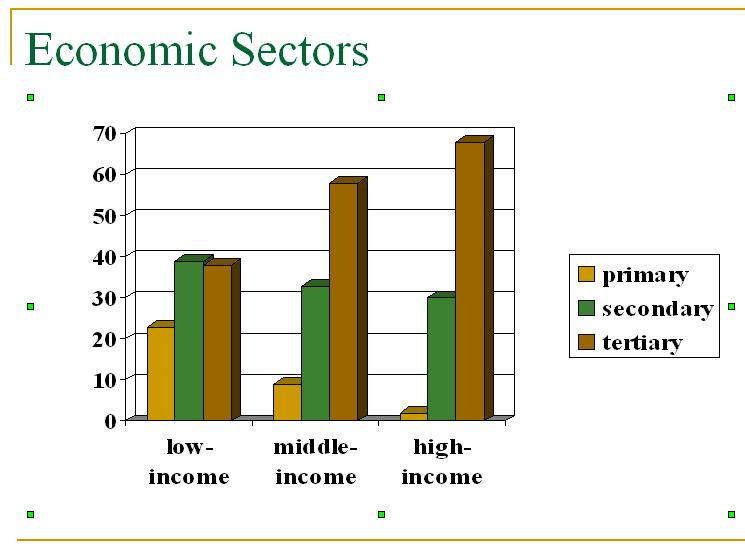
This figure illustrates the percentages of a country's economy made up by different sector. The figure illustrates that countries with higher levels of socio-economic development tend to have less of their economy made up of primary and secondary sectors and more emphasis in tertiary sectors. The less developed countries exhibit the inverse pattern.

Fourastié saw the process as essentially positive, and in The Great Hope of the Twentieth Century he wrote of the increase in quality of life, social security, blossoming of education and culture, higher level of qualifications, humanisation of work, and avoidance of unemployment. The distribution of the workforce among the three sectors progresses through different stages as follows, according to Fourastié:

=== First phase: Traditional civilizations ===
Workforce quotas:

- Primary sector: 64.5%
- Secondary sector: 20%
- Tertiary sector: 15.5%

This phase represents a society which is scientifically not yet very developed, with a negligible use of machinery. The state of development corresponds to that of European countries in the early Middle Ages, or that of a modern-day developing country.

=== Second phase: Transitional period ===
Workforce quotas:

- Primary sector: 40%
- Secondary sector: 40%
- Tertiary sector: 20%

More machinery is deployed in the primary sector, which reduces the number of workers needed to produce a given output of food and raw materials. Since the food requirements of a given population do not change much, employment in agriculture declines as a proportion of the population.

As a result, the demand for machinery production in the secondary sector increases and workers move from agriculture to manufacturing. The transitional way or phase begins with an event which can be identified with the industrialisation: far-reaching mechanisation (and therefore automation) of manufacture, such as the use of conveyor belts. The tertiary sector begins to develop, as do the financial sector and the power of the state.

=== Third phase: Tertiary civilization ===
Workforce quotas:

- Primary sector: 10%
- Secondary sector: 20%
- Tertiary sector: 70%

The primary and secondary sectors are increasingly dominated by automation, and the demand for workforce numbers falls in these sectors. It is replaced by the growing demands of the tertiary sector, where productivity growth is slower.

=== Criticism of Fourastié's model ===
Various empirical studies seemingly confirm the three-sector hypothesis, but employment in the primary sector fell far more than Fourastié predicted. Germany's Federal Statistical Office study shows the following employment proportions for 2014: primary sector at 1.5%, secondary sector at 24.6%, and tertiary sector at 73.9%. Fourastié made four predictions which turned out to be incorrect :

Fourastié predicted that the transition from the secondary to the tertiary sector would eliminate the problem of unemployment as this sector could not be rationalized. When he conceived of the theory in the 1930s, he did not foresee the technological progress made in the service sector, notably the invention of the computer and the advent of the Information Age. Fourastié incorrectly predicted that there would be no country in the highly developed third phase which also has a significant secondary sector. And yet in the German economy, although the secondary sector has sharply declined since the 1950s, it was not to the level that Fourastié predicted, due to Germany's high exports. Another incorrect prediction was that the tertiary sector would always place high demands on employees in terms of education, which is not the case, since the service occupations also include cleaning services, shoeshining, parcel delivery service etc. The high level of income equality predicted by Fourastié also did not take place; in fact, the opposite development has happened: the inequality of income distribution has been increasing in most OECD countries. Fourastié described the tertiary sector - which is usually seen as equivalent with the service sector - as a production sector enjoying little to no technical progress and thus offering at best a slight increase in labor productivity. Confinement of the service sector within the tertiary sector today is only tenable in few areas. Instead, the addition of the fourth "information sector" can be seen, leading towards the development of a knowledge society.

== Extensions to the three-sector model ==
Further development has led to the service or post-industrial society. Today the service sector has grown to such an enormous size that it is sometimes further divided into an information-based quaternary sector, and even a quinary sector based on human services.

=== Quaternary sector ===
The quaternary sector, sometimes referred to as the research and development sector, consists mainly of businesses providing information services, intellectual activities and knowledge based activities aimed at future growth and development.

Activities include, and are mainly composed of: scientific research, ICT/computing, education, consulting, information management and financial planning.

Contrary to what might be inferred from the naming convention, the quaternary sector does not add value to the outputs of the tertiary sector, but provides services directly with limited reliance on purchased inputs. The output of the quaternary sector is difficult to measure. The volume of information produced has grown rapidly, in line with Moore's Law.

=== Quinary sector ===
The quinary sector features the highest level decision-making in the economy. There is not a set definition for the quinary sector, and opinions about what is included within it vary significantly.

Sometimes, only members of government, CEOs and business executives, financial and legal consultants, staff of universities, and managers of non-profits are included. Educators, research scientists, healthcare workers, and media employees may also be included. Others define it as the creation or non-routine use of information and new technologies. In the more liberal definitions, there is considerable overlap with the quaternary sector.

Frequently referred to as ‘gold collar’ professions, many positions in the quinary sector are often highly paid.

== Value added, national accounts and the three sector model ==
The 3 sector model is closely related to the development of national accounts, notably by Colin Clark. The concept of value added is central to national accounting. Value added in the secondary sector of the economy (manufacturing) is equal to the difference between the (wholesale) value of goods produced and the cost of raw materials supplied by the primary sector. Similarly, the value added by the tertiary sector is equal to the difference between the retail price paid by consumers and the wholesale price paid to manufacturers.

The concept of value added is less useful in relation to the quaternary and quinary sectors.

== See also ==
- Colin Clark (economist)
- Jean Fourastié
- Primary sector of the economy
- Secondary sector of the economy
- Tertiary sector of the economy
- Quaternary sector of the economy
- Information Revolution
- De-industrialization
- Private sector
