= Evolution of stamp prices in France =

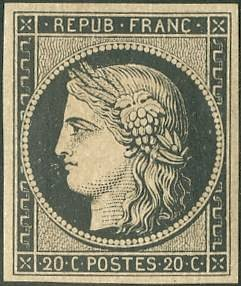
The first French stamp: the black 20 centimes Cérès type 1849.

The evolution of the rate for sending a letter to France at the first weight level can be studied from 1848 to the present day.

== History ==
=== From 1848 to 1945 ===
In 1848, the French Post Office launched the printing of a 20 centime stamp in black and a 1 franc stamp in red.

Between 1849 and 1920, the Post Office's rate for the first weight step was relatively stable between 10 and 40 centimes de franc for 15 grams.

In the interwar period, postal prices rose steadily from 25 centimes in 1920 to 1 franc in 1939.

=== From 1945 to 1975 ===
After the Second World War, the price of a letter weighing less than 20 grams rose from 3 francs in 1946 to 25 francs in 1959.

With the new franc, the domestic rate rose from 25 centimes in 1960 to 40 centimes in 1969.

=== From 1975 to 2015 ===
For some forty years, the price of a stamp for a letter weighing less than 20 grams remained stable, equivalent to 60 and 70 euro cents in 2022.

During the 1970s, the domestic rate for a 20-gram letter rose from 80 centimes to 1.40 francs in 1980.

Between 1983 and 2017, the priority rate increased by 3.06% per year. Since the changeover to the euro in 2001 and until 2017, the same rate has increased by an average of 3.91% per year. In comparison, between 1991 and 2014, inflation in France averaged 1.59% per year.

It's worth noting: Fare increases did not keep pace with inflation in the 1980s. Since then, increases have generally been higher than the rate of inflation.

=== Since 2015 ===
From January 1, 2015, to December 31, 2018, rate increases are governed by a four-year agreement, which limits the increase to 3.5% on top of inflation. However, in October 2017, ARCEP authorized La Poste to override the initial agreement.

In January 2017, La Poste explained that the highest increases of the 2010s were decided "to ensure the sustainability of the universal service in a context of declining mail volumes". However, UFC denounced these increases, in the words of its president, who felt that they acted "as a repellent" and that they were precipitating the end of low value-added service.

== Pricing trends from 1960 to 2022 ==
=== Graphical representation ===
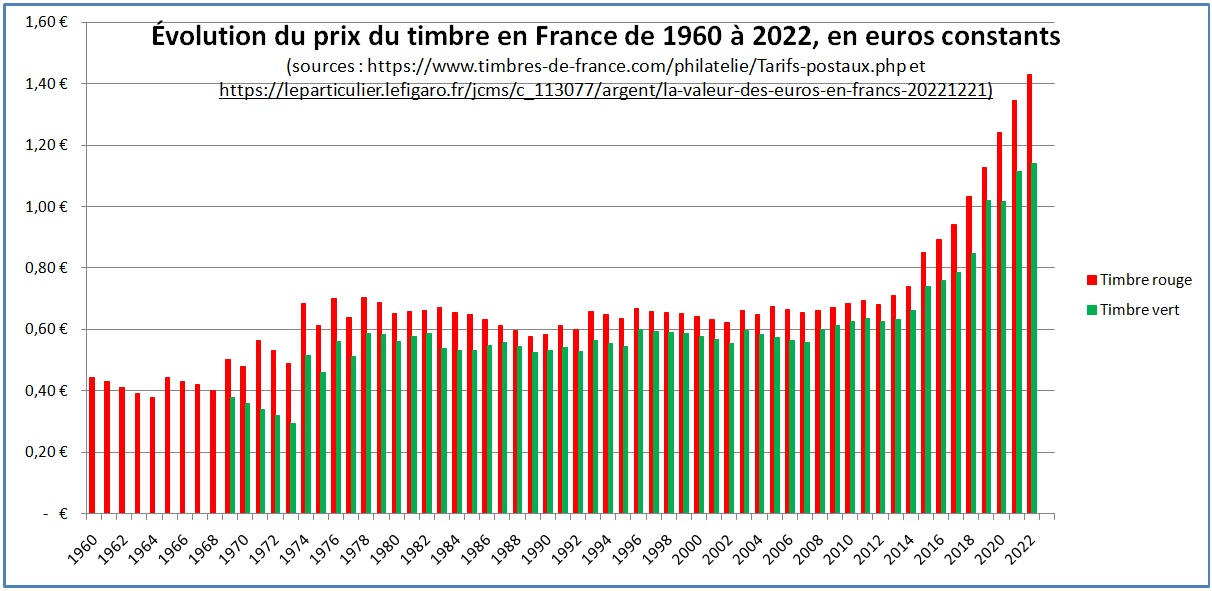
Stamp price trends in France from 1960 to 2022, in constant euros.

In 1984, Jean Fourastié, well known for his work on prices, productivity and technical progress, highlighted the value of having a vision of price trends free from currency variations by introducing the notions of current and constant prices.

The current price is recorded in the current currency at a specific location and date. These are called nominal prices. The constant price is the price in real terms corrected for price changes relative to a base or reference date.

==== Data 1983-present La Poste tariffs for red and green stamps from 1983 to 2024 ====
The table below does not refer to every year since 1983: percentage increases are calculated concerning the line immediately below and are therefore not necessarily annual increases.

Date	up to 20g		
Date	Priority letter rate (red stamp)	Green letter rate (green stamp)	Ecopli rate (grey stamp)
January 1, 2024.	-	€1,29 / 8,46 FRF (+11,2%)	-
January 1, 2022.	€1,43 / 9,38 FRF (+11,7%)	€1,16 / 7,60 FRF (+7,4%)	€1,14 / 7,47 FRF (+7,5%)
January 1, 2021.	€1,28 / 8,40 FRF (+10,3%)	€1,08 / 7,08 FRF (+11,3%)	€1,06 / 6,95 FRF (+11,6%)
January 1, 2020.	€1,16 / 7,61 FRF (+10,5%)	€0,97 / 6,36 FRF (+10,2%)	€0,95 / 6,17 FRF (+10,5%)
January 1, 2019.	€1,05 / 6,89 FRF (+10,5%)	€0,88 / 5,77 FRF (+10,0%)	€0,86 / 5,64 FRF (+10,3%)
January 1, 2018.	€0,95 / 6,23 FRF (+11,8%)	€0,80 / 5,25 FRF (+9,6%)	€0,78 / 5,12 FRF (+9,9%)
January 1, 2017.	€0,85 / 5,58 FRF (+6,3%)	€0,73 / 4,79 FRF (+4,3%)	€0,71 / 4,66 FRF (+4,4%)
January 1, 2016.	€0,80 / 5,25 FRF (+5,3%)	€0,70 / 4,59 FRF (+2,9%)	€0,68 / 4,46 FRF (+3,0%)
January 1, 2015.	€0,76 / 4,99 FRF (+15,2%)	€0,68 / 4,46 FRF (+11,5%)	€0,66 / 4,33 FRF (+11,9%)
January 1, 2014.	€0,66 / 4,33 FRF (+4,8%)	€0,61 / 4,00 FRF (+5,2%)	€0,59 / 3,87 FRF (+5,4%)
January 1, 2013.	€0,63 / 4,13 FRF (+5,0%)	€0,58 / 3,80 FRF (+1,8%)	€0,56 / 3,67 FRF (+1,8%)
October 1, 2011.	€0,60 / 3,94 FRF	€0,57 / 3,74 FRF	€0,55 / 3,60 FRF
July 1, 2011.	€0,60 / 3,94 FRF (+3,4%)	-	€0,55 / 3,60 FRF (+3,8%)
July 1, 2010.	€0,58 / 3,80 FRF (+3,6%)	-	€0,53 / 3,48 FRF (+3,9%)
March 2, 2009.	€0,56 / 3,67 FRF (+1,8%)	-	€0,51 / 3,35 FRF (+2,0%)
March 1, 2008.	€0,55 / 3,61 FRF (+1,9%)	-	€0,50 / 3,28 FRF (+2,0%)
October 1, 2006.	€0,54 / 3,54 FRF (+1,9%)	-	€0,49 / 3,21 FRF (+19,5%)
March 1, 2005.	€0,53 / 3,48 FRF (+6,0%)	-	€0,41 / 2,69 FRF
June 1, 2003.	€0,50 / 3,28 FRF (+8,7%)	-	€0,41 / 2,69 FRF
December 1, 2001. (switched to the euro)	€0,46 / 3,02 FRF	-	€0,41 / 2,69 FRF
March 18, 1996	€0,46 / 3,00 FRF (+7,1%)	-	€0,41 / 2,70 FRF (+10,8%)
July 5, 1993.	€0,43 / 2,80 FRF (+12%)	-	€0,37 / 2,40 FRF (+8,8%)
August 10, 1992.	€0,38 / 2,50 FRF (+8,7%)	-	€0,34 / 2,20 FRF
January 11, 1990.	€0,35 / 2,30 FRF (+4,5%)	-	-
August 16, 1988.	€0,34 / 2,20 FRF (+4,8%)	-	-
July 1, 1984.	€0,32 / 2,10 FRF (+5,0%)	-	-
June 1, 1983.	€0,30 / 2,00 FRF	-	-

=== Since 2023 ===
On January 1, 2023, La Poste abolished the J+4 ecopli rate and the J+1 red stamp, and switched to digital letters. New turquoise stamp (D+2 at €2.95, including tracking notifications).

The price is €1.49 for a 3-sheet E-letter, and €1.16 for a letter delivered on D+3.

== See also ==
- Jean Fourastié
- La Poste (France)
- French franc
