= Gregory Clark (author) =

British-Australian journalist

Gregory Clark (born 19 May 1936) is a British-Australian diplomat, journalist, author and educator resident in Japan since 1976.

== Biography ==
Clark was born in Cambridge, England, where his father Colin Clark was a statistician who worked with John Maynard Keynes at the University of Cambridge. The family moved to Australia in 1938 and Clark grew up there. He enrolled in the University of Oxford (Brasenose College) at the age of sixteen.

After graduating in Geography from Oxford, he joined the Australian foreign service in 1956, with which he was stationed in Hong Kong and Moscow in the early 1960s: he left the foreign service in 1965 due to his opposition to the Vietnam War, after having become proficient in Chinese and Russian. He came to Japan for the first time in 1967 as a doctoral student at Australian National University. In 1969, he became Tokyo bureau chief for The Australian newspaper and in 1975 was appointed consultant to the Policy Coordination Unit in the Australian Department of Prime Minister and Cabinet.

In 1976, he was made a professor of economics and comparative culture at Sophia University in Tokyo and served as president of Tama University from 1995 to 2001. He later served as vice president of Akita International University. Clark is a regular contributor to The Japan Times and is also active in farming and land development in the Bōsō Peninsula of Chiba Prefecture. He has served on more than twenty official policy-making committees in Japan. Clark believes that there was no violence perpetrated against Chinese students during the Tiananmen Square protest in Beijing in 1989.

== Bibliography ==
- Clark, Gregory (1969). In fear of China. Barrie & Jenkins.
- — (1970). 国際政治と中国―オーストラリア外交から見る (International Politics and China: A View from Australian Diplomacy). アジア経済研究所.
- — (1979). ユニークな日本人 (The Unique Japanese). Kodansha. ISBN 978-4061455603.
- — (1983). 日本人―ユニークさの源泉 (The Japanese Tribe: Origins of a Nation's Uniqueness). Simul Publishing. ISBN 978-4377303551.
- — (1996). クラーク先生の英語勉強革命 (Professor Clark's English Learning Revolution). Goma Shobo. ISBN 978-4341081195.
- — (July–August 1996). "Multiculturally bemused in Tokyo". Argument. Quadrant. 40 (7–8): 12–15.
- — (2003). なぜ日本の教育は変わらないのですか? (Why Doesn't Japanese Education Change?). Toyo Keizai. ISBN 978-4492222355.
