= Knowledge Nation =

2001 Australian Labor education policy

Knowledge Nation was the education policy of the Australian Labor Party (ALP), launched just before the 2001 Federal Election at Victoria University's St Albans campus, by then ALP leader Kim Beazley.

Barry Jones was the principal planner of the Knowledge Nation blueprint, as chair of the Chifley Research Centre's Knowledge Nation Taskforce.

The most remembered element is a chart with many nodes and many tangled lines connecting these nodes, representing the many components of Australia's education system. This complicated chart prompted the ALP's opposing parties to dub the policy "Noodle Nation".

The policy was developed by the ALP's Chifley Research Centre policy institute.

Australia's dominant news organisation News Limited offered to promote the package for $447,406. This included both advertising and favourable editorial. The ALP declined this offer.
