= Barry Jones (Australian politician) =

Australian politician (born 1932)

The Honourable Barry Jones AC FAA FAHA FTSE FASSA FACE FRSA
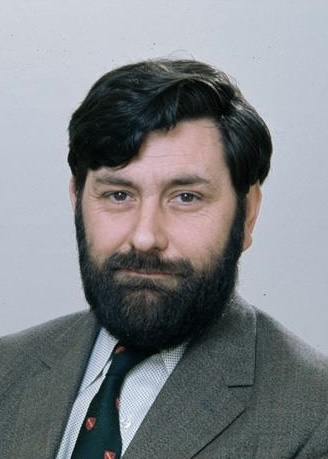
- 1974 Parliamentary portrait

Minister for Science
- In office 11 March 1983 – 4 April 1990
- Preceded by: David Thomson
- Succeeded by: Simon Crean; Science; David Beddall (Small Business and Customs)

National President of the Labor Party
- In office 1 January 2005 – 28 January 2006
- Preceded by: Carmen Lawrence
- Succeeded by: Warren Mundine
- In office 6 June 1992 – 31 July 2000
- Preceded by: Stephen Loosley
- Succeeded by: Greg Sword

Member of the Australian Parliament for Lalor
- In office 10 December 1977 – 31 August 1998
- Preceded by: Jim Cairns
- Succeeded by: Julia Gillard

Member of the Victorian Parliament for Melbourne
- In office June 1972 – November 1977
- Preceded by: Arthur Clarey
- Succeeded by: Keith Remington

Personal details
- Born: Barry Owen Jones; 11 October 1932 (age 94) Geelong, Victoria, Australia
- Party: Labor
- Spouse(s): Rosemary Hanbury (30 June 1961 – her death June 2006); Rachel Faggetter (13 May 2009)
- Profession: Teacher, writer, politician

Barry Owen Jones AC FAA FAHA FTSE FASSA FACE FRSA (born 11 October 1932) is an Australian writer, teacher, lawyer, social activist, quiz champion, and former politician in the Australian Labor Party. He campaigned against the death penalty throughout the 1960s, particularly against the execution of Ronald Ryan. He is on the National Trust's list of Australian Living Treasures.

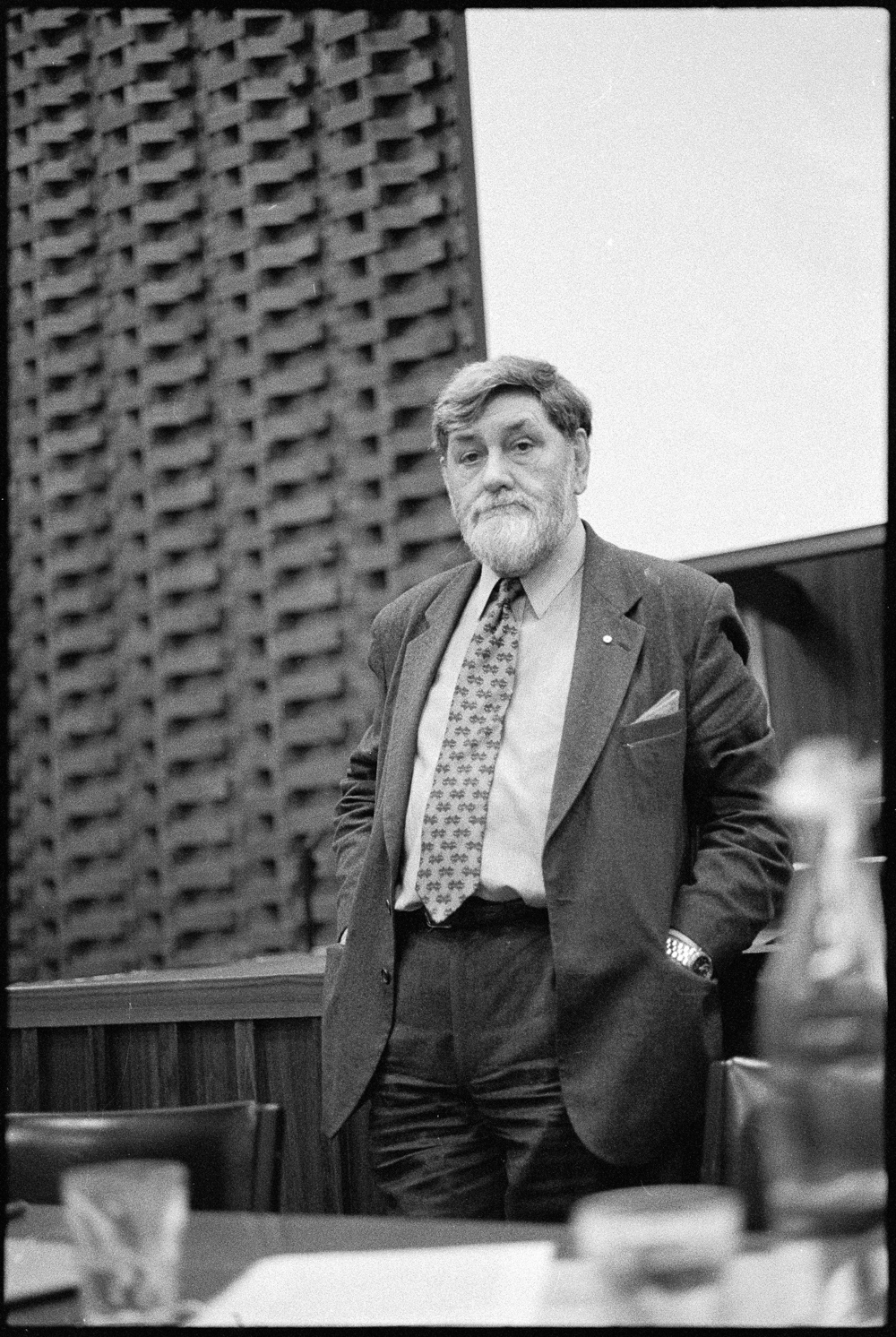
Jones in 2000

== Early life and education ==
Barry Owen Jones was born on 11 October 1932 in Geelong, Victoria, and educated at Melbourne High School and the University of Melbourne, where he studied arts and law.

== Early career ==
Jones began his career as a teacher at Dandenong High School, where he taught for nine years, before becoming a household name as an Australian quiz champion in the 1960s on Bob Dyer's Pick a Box, a radio show from 1948, televised from 1957. He was known for taking issue with Dyer about certain expected answers, most famously in response to a question about "the first British Governor-General of India", where he pointed out that Warren Hastings was technically only the Governor-General of the Presidency of Fort William in Bengal Presidency. Jones' appearances on Pick a Box lasted from 1960 to 1968.

Jones tried his hand at broadcasting on Melbourne radio and in 1967 was one of the pioneers of talkback radio, working at 3DB in Melbourne. His show Talkback to Barry Jones and Mike Walsh's show on Sydney's 2SM were Australia's first talkback shows. Jones believes that modern talkback shows have a much narrower focus than the original shows. He says "I was trying to convey to people a sense of what they didn't know rather than simply talk about football or pets. My emphasis was on using talkback as an instrument for exposing people to new ideas and challenging them, rather than just reinforcing the ideas they already held." Jones was a panellist on 3DB's popular program, Information Please.

== Arts ==
=== Film ===
In 1965, Jones, along with broadcaster and writer Phillip Adams and acclaimed director Fred Schepisi, campaigned strongly for the establishment of the Swinburne Film and Television School, which became Australia's first film school when founded in 1966.

With his friend Phillip Adams, Jones played a significant role in reviving the Australian feature film industry, serving on the Australian Film Development Corporation 1970–1975, and as foundation chair of the Australian Film and Television School 1973–1975 and chair of the Australian Film Institute 1974–1980.

=== Other arts ===
In June 1968, Jones was appointed as an inaugural member of the Australian Council for the Arts. He was a member until 1973, serving as deputy chair under Dr H. C. (‘Nugget’) Coombs from 1971.

On 31 October 2008, Jones was appointed to serve on the board of the Victorian Opera. He retired in 2015. He is a strong supporter of the Australian National Academy of Music (ANAM), the Australian String Quartet, and the Flinders Quartet.

== Political career ==
A member of the Australian Labor Party (ALP) since 1951, Jones was a Federal candidate in 1955, 1958 and 1963, with a strong interest in education and civil liberties.

Jones's political career began in the Victorian Parliament where he represented the electorate of Melbourne as a Labor Member of the Legislative Assembly (MLA) from 1972 to 1977, when he resigned to go into federal politics.

The year before his transfer to federal politics, Jones had unsuccessfully challenged state leader Clyde Holding.

Holding too resigned from state politics to go into federal politics in 1977 and both he and Jones would serve as ministers under Bob Hawke.

He was elected to the House of Representatives at the 1977 Australian federal election as the Labor member for the Federal seat of Lalor in Victoria, which he held until his retirement in 1998. He was Minister for Science in the Hawke government from 1983 to 1990, in which role he ensured the preservation of the CSIRO, and set up the Australia Prize, Questacon and the Commission for the Future. He was also Minister for Small Business 1987-1990 and for Customs 1988–1990. In the 1990 Australian federal election, the ALP lost ten seats in Victoria, the centre-left faction was forced to give up two ministries and Jones lost his place in the ministry.

In 1992, upon the resignation of Stephen Loosley, elected unopposed following a split vote at National Conference in 1991, he was elected National President of the ALP, serving until 2000. He became National President again in 2005–2006.

Jones was the chief architect of the ALP's Knowledge Nation education concept, as chair of the Chifley Research Centre's Knowledge Nation Taskforce. During this time he was also a member of the Council of the National Library of Australia.

In 1987 he chaired the OECD Review of the (then) Yugoslavian economy, in Dubrovnik. Jones took part in an international think tank to advise Mikhail Gorbachev on Perestroika, Moscow (June) 1990.

He was the vice-president of the World Heritage Committee from 1995 to 1996 and a member of the executive board of UNESCO in Paris from 1991 until 1995, succeeding Gough Whitlam in both roles.

Jones and Ian Sinclair served as co-chairs of the 1998 Constitutional Convention on an Australian republic.

== Academic career ==
In 1999 Jones was appointed an adjunct professor at Monash University and became a Vice-Chancellor's Fellow at the University of Melbourne in 2005–2007, and a professorial fellow 2007–.

== Later life ==
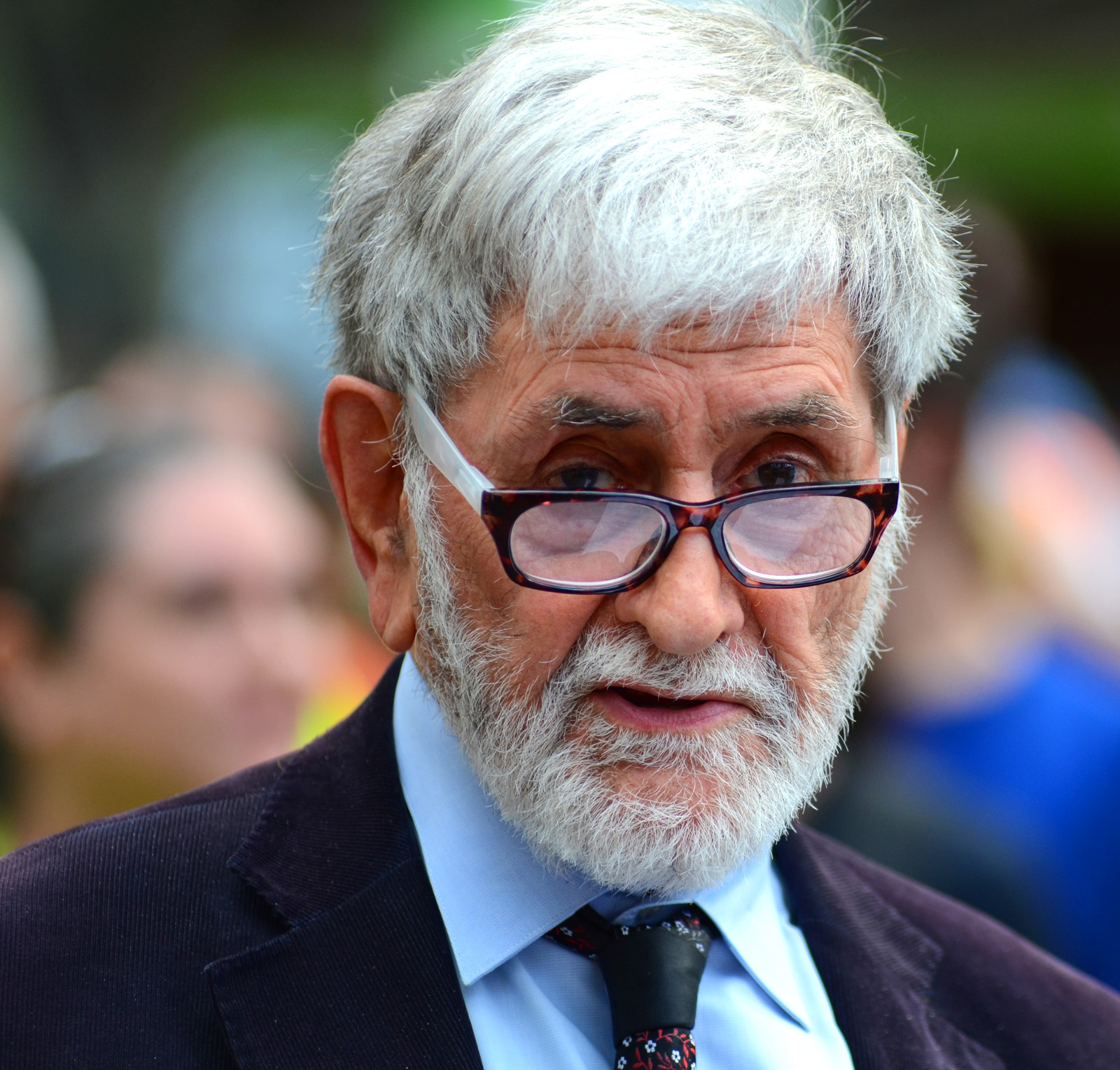
Jones in 2017.

Jones chaired the Victorian Schools Innovation Commission from 2001 until 2005. He chaired the Port Arthur Historic Site Management Authority from 2000 to 2004, and 2005 to 2012 and served on the boards of several medical research institutes. Jones was the founding chair of the advisory board to In2science, a peer mentoring program that builds enthusiasm of Victorian secondary school students for science, technology, engineering and maths (STEM). He chaired Vision2020Australia, the peak eye-health advocacy body, 2002–14.

He appeared regularly as a member of the Brains Trust on the television quiz show The Einstein Factor. He mentioned on an episode of the show that he likes to watch his Wikipedia page grow.

In 2009, Jones joined with Malcolm Fraser, Gustav Nossal, Peter Gration, John Sanderson, and Tilman Ruff to argue that Australia should play a role in the elimination of nuclear weapons.

On 9 April 2010, the Minister for Innovation, Industry, Science and Research, Senator Kim Carr, announced the formation of the Book Industry Strategy Group (BISG) with Jones as chair. The group submitted its report in September 2011.

== Views ==
=== Capital punishment ===
Jones has maintained a long-standing public profile as an outspoken opponent of capital punishment. He led the successful Victorian campaign to prevent the hanging of Robert Tait in 1962 but failed with Ronald Ryan in 1967.

=== Euthanasia ===
Jones's stated position on voluntary euthanasia in the past has been inconclusive but in the Australian parliament he spoke against specific elements in the Rights of the Terminally Ill Act 1995 enabling laws in the Northern Territory. He has noted that popular support is not of itself a compelling reason for its adoption. In the same frequently cited speech from 1996 he noted that "No other issue has troubled me so much because I am not sure that I am correct".

=== Climate change ===
Jones was an early advocate for action on climate change, first advocating for his cabinet colleagues to support action in 1984.

In 2022, Jones was named as an advisor to the fundraising group Climate 200.

== Recognition and honours ==
Jones is on the National Trust's list of Australian Living Treasures.

In 1986 he received the AACTA Longford Lyell Award for lifetime achievement.

On 26 January 1993 Jones was appointed an Officer of the Order of Australia (AO) "For service to the promotion of science, the arts and film, writing and Australian politics".

On 1 January 2001 he was awarded the Centenary Medal, "For dedication to Australia as a knowledge nation".

On 9 June 2014 Jones was promoted within the Order of Australia to Companion level (AC), "For eminent service to the community as a leading intellectual in Australian public life, through contributions to scientific, heritage, musical, medical, political and public health organisations, and to the Australian Parliament".

He holds honorary degrees from University of Wollongong; Doctor of Science from Macquarie University; and Doctor of Laws from the University of Melbourne, and doctorates from Griffith and Deakin Universities. He also holds a Doctor of Letters from the University of Technology Sydney.

He is a Fellow of the Australian Academy of Science (FAA); a Fellow of the Australian Academy of the Humanities (FAHA); a Fellow of the Academy of the Social Sciences in Australia (FASSA); and a Fellow of the Australian Academy of Technological Sciences and Engineering (FTSE): he was the first (and so far the only) person elected Fellow of four of the five Australian learned academies. In 1999 he was elected a Visiting Fellow Commoner at Trinity College, Cambridge. He is also a Fellow of the Australian College of Educators (FACE), a Fellow of the Royal Society of Victoria (FRSV), and a Distinguished Fellow of the Royal Society of New South Wales (DistFRSN).

Barry Jones Bay in the Australian Antarctic Territory and Yalkaparidon jonesi, an extinct marsupial, were named after him. He is the owner of the largest private autograph collection in Australia. The State Library of Victoria acquired part of the collection in 2020.

== Publications ==
=== Sleepers, Wake! (1982) ===
Jones' Sleepers, Wake!: Technology and the Future of Work, published in 1982 by Oxford University Press, canvassed the future implications of the information revolution in creating a post-industrial society, and growth of "the Third Age". It went through four editions and 26 impressions, sold 80,000 copies in Australia and was translated into Chinese, Japanese, Korean, Swedish and Braille. Bill Gates read it; and Deng Xiaoping's daughters Deng Rong (in 1988) and Deng Nan (in 1994) told Jones the book had influenced their father's thinking. It was also significant in Korea, Canada and Ireland.

In 1982 in a speech in Hobart he predicted that by the year 2000 there would be more computers than cars in Tasmania. The scepticism provoked by the claim was highlighted by former prime minister Julia Gillard as an example of a lack of imagination about the future. Due to Sleepers, Wake!, in October 1985 he became the only Australian minister ever invited to address a G7 Summit Meeting, held in Meech Lake, Canada.

=== Other works ===
Jones has been a prolific author of political and sociological books, including:

- Decades of Decision 1860– : A Compendium of Modern History, Sydney: Horwitz, 1965; London, Horwitz, 1965.
- The Penalty is Death: Capital Punishment in the Twentieth Century, Retentionist and Abolitionist Arguments with Special Reference to Australia, Barry Jones, comp., Melbourne : Sun Books in association with the Anti-Hanging Council of Victoria, 1968.
  - Jones, Barry, ed. (2022). The penalty is death : state power, law and justice (Updated ed.). Melbourne: Scribe Publications.
- Joseph II: Enlightenment in Politics, West Melbourne : Victorian Historical Association, ca. 1960–69.
- Age of Apocalypse: Compendium of History 1860 to the Present Day (also titled: Barry Jones' Guide to Modern History: Age of Apocalypse), South Melbourne: Macmillan Company of Australia, 1975.
- The Macmillan Dictionary of Biography, edited by Barry Jones and M. V. Dixon, London: Macmillan; Adelaide: Mary Martin, 1981; South Melbourne: Macmillan, Papermac series, revised and updated edition, 1986; South Melbourne : Macmillan, 3rd edition, 1989.
- Jones, Barry (1982). Sleepers, Wake! : technology and the future of work. Brighton, Sussex: Wheatsheaf Books. ISBN 0-7108-0418-0. OCLC 9577748.
- Dictionary of World Biography, Melbourne: Information Australia, 1994; 2nd edition, 1996.
- Jones, Barry O. (2006). A thinking reed. Crows Nest, NSW: Allen & Unwin. ISBN 978-1-74114-387-4. OCLC 85444882.
- 'Coming to the Party', Barry Jones, ed., Melbourne, Melbourne University Press, 2006
- Dictionary of World Biography, Canberra: Acton, ACT: ANU Press, 2013; 7th ed., 2020. Also published by ANU E Press in digital editions.
- Dictionary of World Biography, Melbourne: Wilkinson Publishing, 2016.
- Jones, Barry (2016). The Shock of Recognition : the Books and Music That Have Inspired Me. Sydney: Allen & Unwin. ISBN 978-1-74176-769-8. OCLC 1038484273.
- Knowledge Courage Leadership, Melbourne: Wilkinson Publishing, 2016.
- Looking into the Abyss: Trump, Australia & Beyond: Understanding the Age of Trump, Melbourne: Wilkinson Publishing, 2018.
- Jones, Barry (2020). What is to be done : political engagement and saving the planet. Melbourne: Scribe Publications. ISBN 978-1-925849-91-2. OCLC 1198569734.

Political offices
Preceded by David Thomson	Minister for Science (and Technology)/ Minister for Science, (Customs) and Small Business; 11 March 1983 – 4 April 1990	Succeeded by Simon Crean (Science); David Beddall (Small; Business and Customs)
Parliament of Australia
Preceded by Jim Cairns	Member for Lalor; 10 December 1977 – 31 August 1998	Succeeded by Julia Gillard
