= Post-industrial society =

Service and knowledge-based society

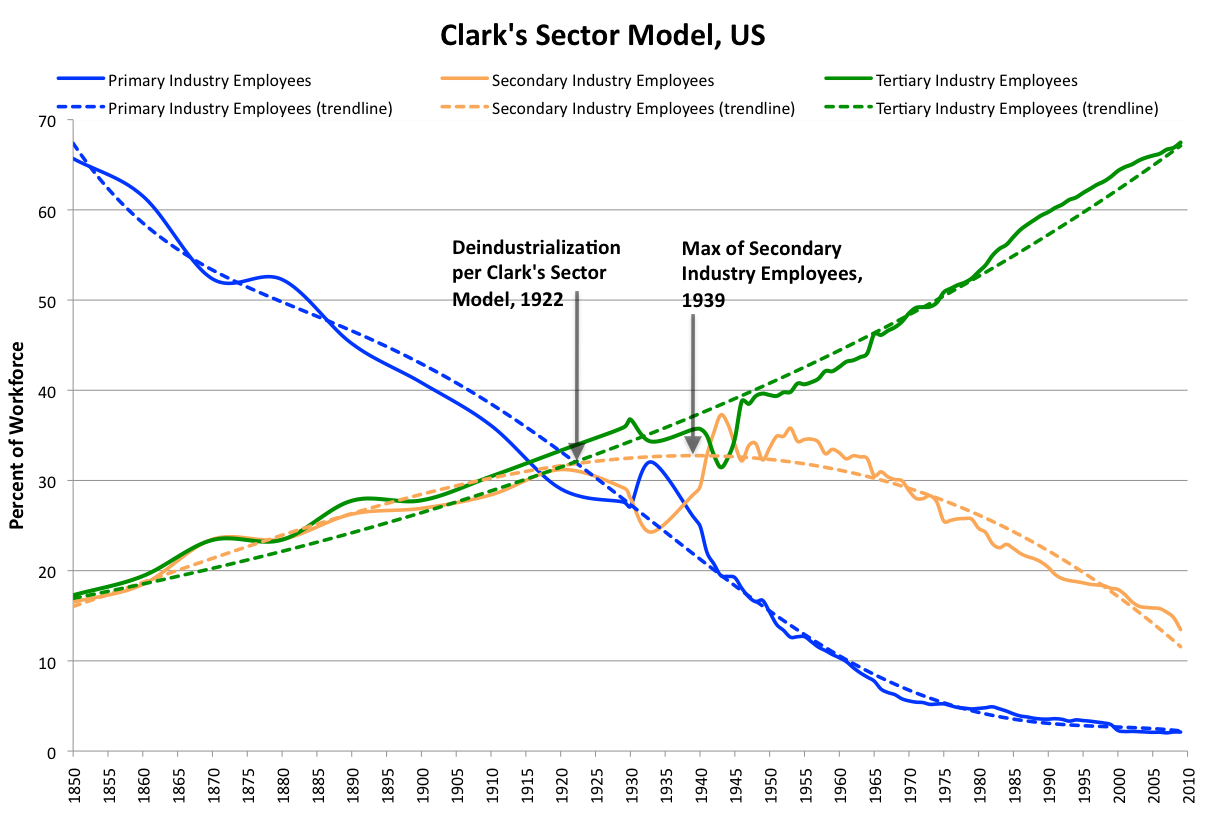
Clark's sector model for US economy 1850–2009. The graph illustrates the predominance of primary, secondary and tertiary industries (as a share of all jobs) over time, as a society develops.

In sociology, the post-industrial society is the stage of society's development when the service sector generates more wealth than the manufacturing sector of the economy.

The term was originated by Alain Touraine and is closely related to similar sociological theoretical concepts such as post-Fordism, information society, knowledge economy, post-industrial economy, liquid modernity, and network society. They all can be used in economics or social science disciplines as a general theoretical backdrop in research design.

As the term has been used, a few common themes, including the ones below have begun to emerge.

1. The economy undergoes a transition from the production of goods to the provision of services.
2. Knowledge becomes a valued form of capital; see Human capital.
3. Producing ideas is the main way to grow the economy.
4. Through processes of globalization and automation, the value and importance to the economy of blue-collar, unionized work, including manual labor (e.g., assembly-line work) decline, and those of professional workers (e.g., scientists, creative-industry professionals, and IT professionals) grow in value and prevalence.
5. Behavioral and information sciences and technologies are developed and implemented (e.g., behavioral economics, information architecture, cybernetics, game theory and information theory).

== Origins ==
Daniel Bell popularized the term through his 1974 work The Coming of Post-Industrial Society. Although some have credited Bell with coining the term, French sociologist Alain Touraine published in 1969 the first major work on the post-industrial society. The term was also used extensively by social philosopher Ivan Illich in his 1973 paper Tools for Conviviality and appears occasionally in Leftist texts throughout the mid-to-late 1960s.

The term has grown and changed as it became mainstream. The term is now used by marketers such as Seth Godin, public policy PhDs such as Keith Boeckelman, and sociologists such as Neil Fligstein and Ofer Sharone. U.S. President Bill Clinton used the term to describe Chinese growth in a round-table discussion in Shanghai in 1998.

== Valuation of knowledge ==
The post-industrialized society is marked by an increased valuation of knowledge. This has been foreshadowed in Daniel Bell's presumption as to how economic employment patterns will evolve in such societies. He asserts employment will grow faster in the tertiary (and quaternary) sector relative to employment in the primary and secondary sector and that the tertiary (and quaternary) sectors will take precedence in the economy. This will continue to occur such that the "impact of the expert" will expand and power will be monopolized by knowledge.

As tertiary and quaternary sector positions are essentially knowledge-oriented, this will result in a restructuring of education, at least in its nuances. The "new power… of the expert" consequently gives rise to the growing role of universities and research institutes in post-industrial societies. Post-industrial societies themselves become oriented around these places of knowledge production and production of experts as their new foci. Consequently, the greatest beneficiaries in the post-industrial society are young urban professionals. As a new, educated, and politicized generation, more impassioned by liberalism, social justice, and environmentalism, comes into being; the shift of power into their hands, as a result of their knowledge endowments, is often cited as a good thing.

The increasing importance of knowledge in post-industrial societies results in a general increase in expertise through the economy and throughout society. In this manner, it eliminates what Alan Banks and Jim Foster identify as "undesirable work as well as the grosser forms of poverty and inequality". This effect is supplemented by the aforementioned movement of power into the hands of young educated people concerned with social justice.

Economists at Berkeley have studied the value of knowledge as a form of capital, adding value to material capital, such as a factory or a truck. Speaking along the same lines of their argument, the addition or 'production' of knowledge, could become the basis of what would undoubtedly be considered 'post-industrial' policies meant to deliver economic growth.

The valuation of specifically scientific knowledge and technology can paradoxically be devalued by individuals in a post-industrial society as they still expect its benefits but are more sensitized to moral trade-offs and risks.

== Creativity culture ==
Similarly, post-industrial society has serviced the creative culture. Many of those most well-equipped to thrive in an increasingly technological society are young adults with tertiary education. As education itself becomes more and more oriented towards producing people capable of answering the need for self-actualization, creativity, and self-expression, successive generations become more endowed with the ability to contribute to and perpetuate such industries. This change in education, as well among the emerging class of young professionals, is initiated by what James D Wright identifies as an "unprecedented economic affluence and the satiation of basic material needs". Ellen Dunham-Jones as well observes this feature of post-industrial society where "abundant goods [are] equitably distributed [in order that] laborless leisure and self-determination" can be consumed.

The post-industrial society is stressed to be one where knowledge is power and technology is the instrument. Naturally, where one is creatively inclined, they are advantaged by such a society. The doctrine of "speed, mobility, and malleability" is well suited to a dynamic creative industry and as industries of good production decrease in precedence, the way is paved for artists, musicians, and other such types, whose skills are better used by the tertiary and quaternary sector. Urban geographer Trevor Barnes, in his work outlining the Vancouver experience in post-war development, evokes the post-industrial condition, citing the emergence and consolidation of a significant video games industry as a constituent of the elite service sector.

This increased faculty of the post-industrialist society with respects to the creative industry is reflected by the economic history of post-industrial societies. As economic activities shift from primarily primary and secondary sector-based to tertiary, and later quaternary, sector-based, cities in which this shift occurs become more open to exchanges of information. This is necessitated by the demands of a tertiary and quaternary sector: in order to better service an industry focused on finance, education, communication, management, training, engineering, and aesthetic design, the city must become points of exchange capable of providing the most updated information from across the globe. Conversely, as cities become a convergence of international ideas, the tertiary and quaternary sector can be expected to grow.

A cult of 'creatives' have sprung up embodying and often describing and defending the post-industrial ethos. They argue that businesses that create intangibles have taken a more prominent role in the wake of manufacturing's decline.

Actor and then-artistic director of the Old Vic Theatre, Kevin Spacey, has argued the economic case for the arts in terms of providing jobs and being of greater importance in exports than manufacturing (as well as an educational role) in a guest column he wrote for The Times.

== Criticism ==
Post-industrialism is criticized for the amount of real fundamental change it produces in society, if any at all. A mild view held by Alan Banks and Jim Foster contends that representations of post-industrial society by advocates assume professional, educated elites were previously less relevant than they have become in the new social order, and that changes that have occurred are minor but greatly embellished. More critical views see the entire process as the highest evolution of capitalism, wherein the system produces commodities as opposed to practical goods and is determined privately instead of socially. This view is complemented by the assertion that "the characteristic feature of a modern [that is, post-industrial] society is that it is a technocracy". Such societies then become notable for their ability to subvert social consciousness through powers of manipulation rather than powers of coercion, reflective of the "ideology of the ruling class [as] … predominantly managerial". Pope Francis has suggested that "the post-industrial period may well be remembered as one of the most irresponsible in history", although he follows this comment with "the hope that humanity at the dawn of the twenty-first century will be remembered for having generously shouldered its grave responsibilities".

In line with the view that nothing fundamental has changed in the transition from industrial societies to post-industrial societies is the insistence of lingering problems from past development periods. Neo-Malthusian in essence, this outlook focuses on post-industrial society's continuing struggle with issues of resource scarcity, overpopulation, and environmental degradation, all of which are remnants from its industrial history. This is exacerbated by a "corporate liberalism" that seeks to continue economic growth through "the creation and satisfaction of false needs", or as Christopher Lasch more derisively refers to it, "subsidized waste".

Urban development (UD) in the context of post-industrialism is also a point of contention. In opposition to the view that the new leaders of post-industrial society are increasingly environmentally aware, this critique asserts that UD rather leads to environmental degradation, which is rooted in the patterns of development. Urban sprawl, characterised behaviourally by cities "expanding at the periphery in even lower densities" and physically by "office parks, malls, strips, condo clusters, corporate campuses, and gated communities", is singled out as the main issue. Resulting from a post-industrialist culture of "mobile capital, the service economy, post-Fordist disposable consumerism and banking deregulation", urban sprawl has caused post-industrialism to become environmentally and socially regressive. Of the former, environmental degradation results from encroachment as cities meet demands on low-density habitation; the wider spread of population consumes more of the environment while necessitating more energy consumption to facilitate travel within the ever-growing city, incurring greater pollution. This process evokes the neo-Malthusian concerns of overpopulation and resource scarcity that inevitably lead to environmental deterioration. Of the latter, "post-industrialism's doctrine of … mobility and malleability" encourage a disconnect between communities where social belonging falls into the category of things considered by the "post-Fordist disposable consumer[ist]" attitude as interchangeable, expendable, and replaceable.

Post-industrialism as a concept is highly Western-centric. Theoretically and effectively, it is only possible in the Global West, which its proponents assume to be solely capable of fully realizing industrialization and then post-industrialization. Herman Kahn optimistically predicted the "economic growth, expanded production and growing efficiency" of post-industrial societies and the resultant "material abundance and… high quality of life" to extend to "almost all people in Western societies" and only "some in Eastern societies". This prediction is treated elsewhere by contentions that the post-industrial society merely perpetuates capitalism.

Recalling the critical assertion that all modern societies are technocracies, T. Roszak completes the analysis by stating that "all societies are moving in the direction of technocracies". From this, the foremost "suave technocracies" reside in the West, whereas all others are successively graded in descending order: "vulgar technocracies", "teratoid technocracies", and finally "comic opera technocracies". This view importantly presumes one transition and furthermore one path of transition for societies to undergo, i.e. the one that Western societies are slated to complete. Much like the demographic transition model, this prediction does not entertain the idea of an Eastern or other alternative models of transitional development.

=== Neologism ===
When historians and sociologists considered the revolution that followed the agricultural society they did not call it a "post-agricultural society". "Post-industrial society" signifies only a departure, not a positive description.

One of the word's early users, Ivan Illich, prefigured this criticism and invented the term Conviviality, or the Convivial Society, to stand as a positive description of his version of a post-industrial society.

=== Social critique ===
A group of scholars (including Allen Scott and Edward Soja) argue that industry remains at the center of the whole process of capitalist accumulation, with services not only becoming increasingly industrialized and automated but also remaining highly dependent on industrial growth.

Some observers, including Soja (building on the theories of the French philosopher of urbanism Henri Lefebvre), suggest that although industry may be based outside of a "post-industrial" nation, that nation cannot ignore industry's necessary sociological importance.

Further concerns can be raised regarding the difference in mindset and objectives between those in an industrial society, and those in a post-industrial one. For instance, if the industrial society (producing the raw materials and goods consumed by its peer) were for some reason to cut off supply to the post-industrial nation, there would be little recourse for the latter to ensure that supply chains were not disrupted. Since the society based on ideas would have diminished real product output, the industrial society would be in a position to dictate terms to its counterpart. The response from the "more advanced" nation might be eventually effective or damaging, however it would be hard pressed to bridge the gap until domestic industry could makeup for the lack of imported manufactured goods.

== See also ==
- Deindustrialization
- Late modernity
- Late capitalism
- Industrial society
- Information society
- Information revolution
- Knowledge economy
- Network society
- Post-capitalism
- Post-democracy
- Post-Marxism
- Post-modernity
- Post-scarcity economy
- Sleepers, Wake!
- Sociocultural evolution
- Technological unemployment
- Urban decay
- Future Shock

People

- Heinz von Foerster
- Alvin Toffler
- Alain Touraine
