= Sleepers, Wake! =

1982 book by Barry Jones

Sleepers, Wake! Technology and the Future of Work
- Title page for Sleepers, Wake! Technology and the Future of Work (1982)
- Author: Barry Jones
- Language: English
- Genre: Non-fiction
- Publication date: 1982
- Publication place: Australia
- ISBN: 978-019553756-7

Sleepers, Wake! Technology and the Future of Work is a book written by Barry Jones, originally published in 1982 and reprinted many times. A revised and updated edition was published in 1995.

Based on the premise that technologically advanced nations are currently passing through a post-industrial or information revolution, Jones analyzes the unique threats and opportunities of the sudden rise in information to the field such as manufacturing, service employment, and basic income.

Jones argues that science and technology have changed the quality, length, and direction of life in the past century far more than politics, education, ideology, or religion. Therefore, inventors such as Thomas Edison and Henry Ford have shaped human experience more broadly and enduringly than Lenin and Hitler.

Some of the book's key points, such as the claim that technological innovation is a major component of economic growth, are more widely accepted now than in 1982. But, to quote Barry Jones himself, "The central thesis was that people were going to be living longer, far longer, but it was possible that they would be working a good deal less."

Due to the rising issues for the labour force, Jones proposed the need to assist workers in income support and choosing to stay or leave the workforce. However, Jones noted in the 1990 edition that the Labor government did not pursue the idea of basic income when it won office in 1983.

Sleepers, Wake! analyzes the major changes in the workforce and presents the possible political programs to assist the society in profiting from the technological advancements.

The fourth edition uses 1991 Commonwealth census data as confirmation of his thesis about changes in the labour force.

Barry Jones was Australia's Minister for Science in the Hawke government from 1983 to 1990.

== Bibliography ==
- Jones, Barry Owen (1995) [First published 1982]. Sleepers, Wake! Technology and the Future of Work (4th ed.). Oxford University Press. ISBN 978-019553756-7.
