= National Economic Advisory Council =

The National Economic Advisory Council was set up by second Labour government of United Kingdom Prime Minister Ramsay MacDonald.

The Prime Minister chaired the Council which included several cabinet ministers, businessmen, the trade unionist Ernest Bevin, the economic historian R. H. Tawney and several economists G. D. H. Cole, Hugh Dalton, Maynard Keynes, A. C. Pigou, Colin Clark and Lionel Robbins.
