= Lieu Da-Kuin =

Chinese economist

D. K. Lieu
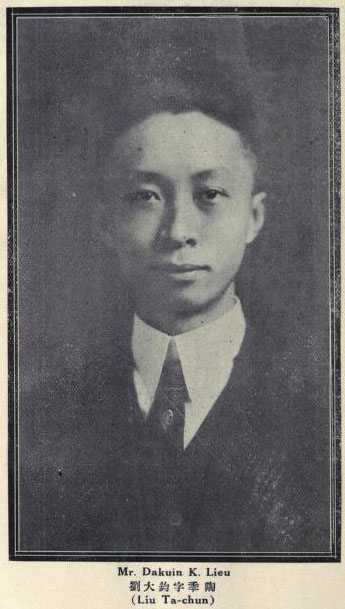
- Born: 1891; Huai'an, Jiangsu, Qing dynasty
- Died: 1962 (aged 70–71); United States

Academic background
- Education: Imperial University; University of Michigan
- Academic advisors: Henry Adams and Fred Taylor

Lieu Da-Kuin or Liu Dajun (simplified Chinese: 刘大钧; traditional Chinese: 劉大鈞; pinyin: Liú Dàjūn; 1891–1962), also alternatively spelled as Dakuin K. Lieu, commonly known in English as D. K. Lieu, was a prominent Chinese economist in the twentieth century. Together with Ma Yinchu, He Lian and Fang Xianting, he is described as one of the "Four Major Economists of the Republic of China".

== Biography ==
Dakuin K. Lieu, ancestrally from Dantu, Jiangsu, was born in Huai'an, Jiangsu, in 1891. He received private tutoring until 1905, went to Shanghai to attend the Y.M.C.A. School, and graduated from Imperial University (currently Peking University) in 1911.

After graduating from the Imperial University, Lieu went to the United States to study at the University of Michigan, where he studied economics and statistics at the University of Michigan under the tutelage of Henry Carter Adams and Fred M. Taylor, receiving his bachelor's degree in 1915.

Upon his return to China, he taught English for a short time at Qinghua and soon became one of China's leading economic commentators.

He retained links to the University of Michigan through the Michigan Club of Peking of which he was president in 1921.

In 1945, Lieu served as the Chinese representative to the United Nations Statistical Commission, and in 1947, he became the Economic Counselor at the National Government Embassy in the United States. He retired in 1953 and resided in the US, where he died in 1962.

== Works ==
- China's Tennant Farming Economy. Pacific Bookstore. 1929.
- A Report on Chinese Industry. Institute of Economic Statistics. 1937.
- The Industrialization of Shanghai. Commercial Press. 1940.
- Industrialization and the Construction of the Chinese Industry. Commercial Press. 1946.
