= Primary sector =

Industry of raw materials and unprocessed food

In economics, the primary sector is the economic sector which comprises industry involved in the extraction and production of raw materials, such as farming, logging, fishing, forestry and mining. The primary sector tends to make up a larger portion of the economy in developing countries than it does in developed countries. For example, in 2018, agriculture, forestry, and fishing comprised more than 15% of GDP in sub-Saharan Africa but less than 1% of GDP in North America.

In developed countries the primary sector has become more technologically advanced, enabling for example the mechanization of farming, as compared with lower-tech methods (Note: Often using non-powered equipment, sometimes even hand-picking and hand-planting) in poorer countries. More developed economies may invest additional capital in primary means of production: for example, in the United States Corn Belt, combine harvesters pick the corn, and sprayers spray large amounts of insecticides, herbicides and fungicides, producing a higher yield than is possible using less capital-intensive techniques. These technological advances and investment allow the primary sector to employ a smaller workforce, so developed countries tend to have a smaller percentage of their workforce involved in primary activities, instead having a higher percentage involved in the secondary and tertiary sectors.

== List of countries by agricultural output ==
Largest countries by agricultural output (in PPP terms) according to the IMF and CIA World Factbook, at peak level as of 2018
Economy	Countries by agricultural output (in PPP terms) at peak level as of 2018 (billions in USD)
(01) China	2,101
(02) India	1,400
(03) Indonesia	486
(—) European Union	352
(04) Pakistan	284
(05) Nigeria	253
(06) Brazil	209
(07) Russia	196
(08) United States	185
(09) Iran	162
(10) Turkey	155
(11) Egypt	154
(12) Thailand	109
(13) Vietnam	108
(14) Bangladesh	108
(15) Argentina	101
(16) Mexico	100
(17) Philippines	92
(18) Myanmar	89
(19) Algeria	87
(20) Malaysia	84
The twenty largest countries by agricultural output (in PPP terms) at peak level as of 2018, according to the IMF and CIA World Factbook.

== See also ==
- Resource curse
- Three-sector model
