= Jean Fourastié =

French economist

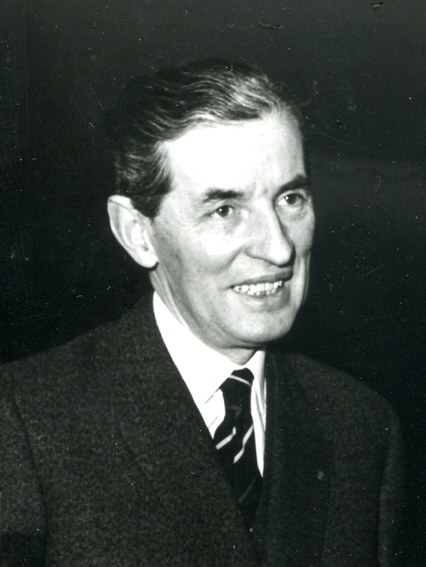
- Born: 15 April 1907; Saint Benin d'Azy, Nièvre, France
- Died: 25 July 1990 (aged 83); Douelle, Lot, France
- Education: École Centrale Paris, École Libre des Sciences Politiques, Université de Paris
- Awards: Grand Cross of the National Order of Merit, Commandeur de la Légion d'Honneur
- Scientific career
- Fields: Economy, sociology, philosophy
- Thesis: Le contrôle de l'Etat sur les Sociétés d'Assurance (1936)

Jean Fourastié (French: [ʒɑ̃ fuʁastje]; 15 April 1907 – 25 July 1990) was a French civil servant, economist, professor and public intellectual. He coined the expression Trente Glorieuses ("the glorious thirty [years]") to describe the period of prosperity that France experienced from the end of World War II until the 1973 oil crisis.

== Biography ==
Jean Fourastié received his elementary and secondary education at the private Catholic College of Juilly from 1914 to 1925. Then in Paris, he boarded at École Massillon and enrolled in classe préparatoire aux grandes écoles at Lycée Saint-Louis. He was admitted into École Centrale Paris, from which he graduated in 1930, but was not attracted by an engineering career. Instead, he pursued studies at École Libre des Sciences Politiques where his professors included Charles Rist and Jean Romieu. He received a law degree in 1933, followed by doctor of law In 1937 with a thesis on insurance supervision.

In 1932, Fourastié successfully passed the examination to become an insurance supervisor for the French state (French: commissaire-contrôleur des compagnies d'assurances). He stayed two years at the Octroi de Paris, a low-level bureaucratic position, and in 1934 joined the Direction du contrôle de l'Etat sur les assurances, then part of the French Labor Ministry. He was instrumental in the adoption on 28 July 1939 of a mandatory accounting framework for insurance companies, France's first-ever attempt at accounting standard-setting. He would stay in the civil service until 1951.

During World War II, Fourastié kept working for the state under Vichy France, while keeping distance from direct collaboration with Germany's Nazi regime. In January 1941, he started giving a course on insurance at the Conservatoire National des Arts et Métiers (CNAM), replacing his ministry colleague Maxime Malinski who was Jewish and thus had been victim of the 1940 Vichy anti-Jewish legislation. Fourastié's course met instant success with CNAM students. He also taught general accounting at École Libre des Sciences Politiques between 1941 and 1943. In early 1942 he briefly served in the cabinet (private office) of Vichy Finance Minister Yves Bouthillier. In 1941 and 1943, he participated in the committee chaired by Auguste Detœuf that created France's General Accounting Framework (French: Plan Comptable Général), itself largely modeled on the German accounting framework of 1937 championed by Hermann Göring. In September–October 1944, the ad hoc body that investigated acts of collaboration (French: commission d'épuration du ministère des Finances) cleared Fourastié of any charges, following a process in which Malinski defended Fourastié's innocence.

Fourastié then taught at the newly created École nationale d'administration and played an enhanced role in the renewed Plan Comptable committee chaired from 1946 by Robert Lacoste. In 1945, Jean Monnet hired him to serve as an economic advisor on the Commissariat général du Plan, serving the country's economic reconstruction under the direct authority of the Prime Minister of France. He served four terms as president of the workforce modernization commission, and in 1961 he was chosen as a member of the "1985 working group" of the Commissariat.

In 1948, Fourastié became vice president of the scientific and technical committee of the European Economic Cooperation Organization (predecessor of the OECD). From 1954 to 1957, he led the European Coal and Steel Community's study group on the conditions and effects of technical progress in the steel industry. In 1957 he was appointed as a United Nations expert for the Mexican government and to the economic commission for Latin America.

Fourastié was a professor at the Institut d'Etudes Politiques de Paris until his retirement in 1978. He became professor (Directeur d'études) at the VIth section of the École Pratique des Hautes Études (later EHESS) in 1951, and from 1960 he held the chair of Economics and Industrial Statistics at CNAM.

In 1966, Fourastié became a columnist for the daily newspaper Le Figaro. Until 1968 he presented the monthly program "Quart d'heure" ("quarter hour") on French state television.

In 1968, he was elected to the Académie des Sciences Morales et Politiques, and became its president in 1978. In 1981, he was named president of the central administrative commission of the Institut de France.

== Publications ==
- Le Contrôle de l'État sur les sociétés d'assurances. Paris, Faculté de Droit, 1937, 275 p.
- Le Nouveau Régime juridique et technique de l'assurance en France. Paris, L'Argus, 1941, 282 p.
- La Comptabilité. Paris, Presses Universitaires de France, 1943, 128 p. Coll. Que sais-je? (ISBN 978-2130386087)
- Comptabilité générale conforme au plan comptable général. Paris, Librairie générale de droit et de jurisprudence, 1944, 271 p.
- L'Économie française dans le monde, avec la collaboratioun de Henri Montet. Paris, Presses universitaires de France, 1945, 136 p., Coll. Que sais-je ? n° 191
- Les Assurances au point de vue économique et social. Paris, Payot, 1946, 132 p. (Bibliothèque économique).
- Esquisse d'une théorie générale de l'évolution économique contemporaine, Paris, Presses Universitaires de France, 1947, 32 p.
- Note sur la philosophie des sciences, Paris, Presses Universitaires de France, 1948, 36 p.
- Le Grand Espoir du XXe siècle. Progrès technique, progrès économique, progrès social. Paris, Presses Universitaires de France, 1949, 224 p. - Réed 1989 collection Tel Gallimard
- La Civilisation de 1960. Paris, Presses universitaires de France, 1947. 120 p. (Coll. Que sais-je ? n° 279). Ed. remaniée en 1953 sous le titre : La Civilisation de 1975, en 1974, sous le titre : La Civilisation de 1995 et en 1982 sous le titre : La Civilisation de 2001. 11e éd. : 1982.
- Le progrès technique et l'évolution économique, Institut d'Études Politiques de Paris, Paris, les cours de Droit (deux fascicules), 1951–52, 249 p.
- Machinisme et bien-être. Paris, Ed. de Minuit, 1951, 256 p. (Coll. l'Homme et la machine, dirigée par Georges Friedmann, n° 1), translated in English : The causes of wealth, The Free Press of Glencoe, Illinois, 1960.
- La Productivité Paris, Presses universitaires de France, 1952, 120 p. (Coll. Que sais-je ? n° 557). (11e éd. : 1987) (ISBN 978-2130398660)
- La prévision économique et la direction des entreprises. Paris, Presses universitaires de France, 1955, 152 p.
- Productivity, prices et wages, Paris, O.E.C.E., 1957, 115 p.
- Pourquoi nous travaillons. Paris, Presses universitaires de France, 1959, 128 p. (Coll. Que sais-je ? n° 818). (8e éd. : 1984). (Traduit en espagnol, japonais, allemand, portugais, grec) (ISBN 978-2130384762).
- La Grande Métamorphose du XXe siècle. Essais sur quelques problèmes de l'humanité d'aujourd'hui. Paris, Presses universitaires de France, 1961, 224 p.
- La Planification économique en France, avec la collaboration de Jean-Paul Courthéoux. Paris, Presses universitaires de France, 1963, 208 p. (Coll. L'organisateur)
- Les Conditions de l'esprit scientifique. Paris, Gallimard, 1966, 256 p. (Coll. Idées n° 96).
- Les 40 000 heures. Paris, Gonthier-Laffont, 1965. 247 p. (Coll. Inventaire de l'avenir n°1).
- Essais de morale prospective. Paris, Gonthier; 1966, 200 p.
- Lettre ouverte à quatre milliards d'hommes. Paris, A. Michel, 1970, 167 p. (Coll. Lettre ouverte)
- Prévision, futurologie, prospective, Cours de l'Institut d'Études Politiques de Paris. 1973–74. Paris, Les cours de droit, 1974, 113 p. (ronéoté).
- L'Église a-t-elle trahi ? Dialogue entre Jean Fourastié et René Laurentin. Paris, Beauchesne, 1974, 192 p.
- Pouvoir d'achat, prix et salaires, avec la collaboration de Jacqueline Fourastié. Paris, Gallimard, 1977, 223 p. (Coll. Idées n° 374).
- La réalité économique. Vers la révision des idées dominantes en France, avec la collaboration de Jacqueline Fourastié, Paris, R. Laffont, 1978, 365 p. (Réédité en 1986, Paris, Hachette, 423 p. Coll. Pluriel n° 8488) .
- Les Trente Glorieuses, ou la révolution invisible de 1946 à 1975, Paris, Fayard, 1979, 300 p. (Rééd Hachette Pluriel n° 8363) (ISBN 978-2213006833).
- Ce que je crois, Paris, Grasset, 1981.
- Le Rire, suite, Paris, Denoël-Gonthier, 1983
- Pourquoi les prix baissent, avec la collaboration de Béatrice Bazil, Paris, Hachette, 1984, 320 p. (Coll. Pluriel n° 8390).

== See also ==
- Three-sector hypothesis
- Evolution of stamp prices in France

== Notes and references ==
The information on this page is partially translated from the equivalent page in French fr:Jean Fourastié licensed under the Creative Commons/Attribution Sharealike . History of contributions can be checked here:
