= Colin Clark (economist) =

British and Australian economist and statistician

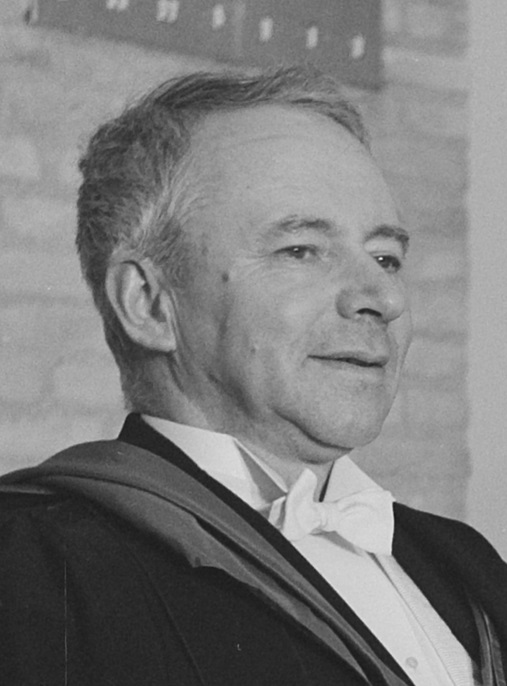
- Born: 2 November 1905; London, England
- Died: 4 September 1989 (aged 83); Brisbane, Australia
- Education: Oxford University
- Spouse: Marjorie Tattersall (m. 1935)
- Children: 9
- Scientific career
- Fields: Economics
- Workplaces: Oxford University, Cambridge University, Monash University, University of Queensland
- Doctoral students: Sir Richard Stone; V.K.R.V. Rao; Sir Alexander Cairncross; Hans Singer

Colin Grant Clark (2 November 1905 – 4 September 1989) was a British and Australian economist and statistician who worked in both the United Kingdom and Australia. He pioneered the use of gross national product (GNP) as the basis for studying national economies.

== Early years ==
Colin Clark was born in London in 1905 and was educated at the Dragon School in Oxford, then at Winchester College. He subsequently attended Brasenose College, Oxford, where he graduated in chemistry in 1928. After graduation he worked as a research assistant with William Beveridge at the London School of Economics (1928–29) and then with Sir Alexander Carr-Saunders and Allyn Young at the University of Liverpool (1929–30). During this time he ran unsuccessful campaigns to be elected to parliament for the Labour Party in the constituency of North Dorset (1929), and later at Liverpool Wavertree (1931) and South Norfolk (1935).

In 1930 he was appointed a research assistant to the National Economic Advisory Council newly convened by Prime Minister Ramsay MacDonald. He resigned shortly after his appointment, after being asked to write a background memorandum to make a case for protectionism. Despite this, he had sufficiently impressed one of the council members (John Maynard Keynes) to secure an appointment as a lecturer in statistics at Cambridge University.

== Lecturer at Cambridge ==
At Cambridge, he was a lecturer in statistics from 1931 to 1938. There he also completed three books: The National Income 1924–31 (1932), The Economic Position of Great Britain (jointly with A. C. Pigou) (1936) and National Income and Outlay (1937). His first book was sent to the publisher Daniel Macmillan with a recommendation from John Maynard Keynes: "[...] Clark is, I think, a bit of a genius: almost the only economic statistician I have ever met who seems to me quite first-class."

== Move to Australia ==
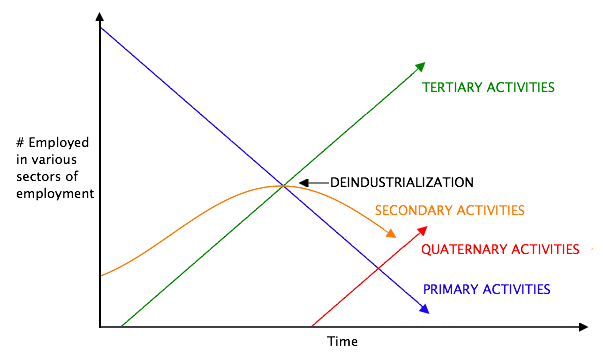
Clark's sector model of an economy undergoing technological change. In later stages, the Quaternary sector of the economy grows.

During a visit to Australia and New Zealand in 1937 and 1938 he accepted a position with the Queensland Government at the invitation of the premier Forgan Smith. At the time he wrote to Keynes about his decision to stay in Australia. As he put it, the chance to advise the Queensland Premier on 'practically everything connected with economic matters' was 'too remarkable an opportunity to be missed for putting economics into practice'

On 6 May 1938, he was appointed Government Statistician, Director of the Bureau of Industry, and Financial Advisor to the Queensland Treasury, and provided the State's first set of economic accounts in 1940. He also held the position of deputy director (Queensland) of the Commonwealth Department of War Organisation of Industry from 1942 to 1946. Clark resigned as Government Statistician on 28 February 1947 to become Under Secretary of the Queensland Department of Labour and Industry.

Clark corresponded with the Eugenics Education Society in London and in 1937 gave the inaugural lecture to the Eugenics Society of Victoria, which he titled The Menace of Depopulation. He appeared alongside Norman Haire, Enid Lyons and Jessie Street in the controversial 1944 ABC Radio debate title "Population Unlimited?", where he described birth control as "filthy, vicious and disgusting" and a form of perversion.

Unusually for a public servant he continued his academic work, publishing numerous articles on economics and preparing his book Conditions of Economic Progress which was published in 1940.

== Later years ==
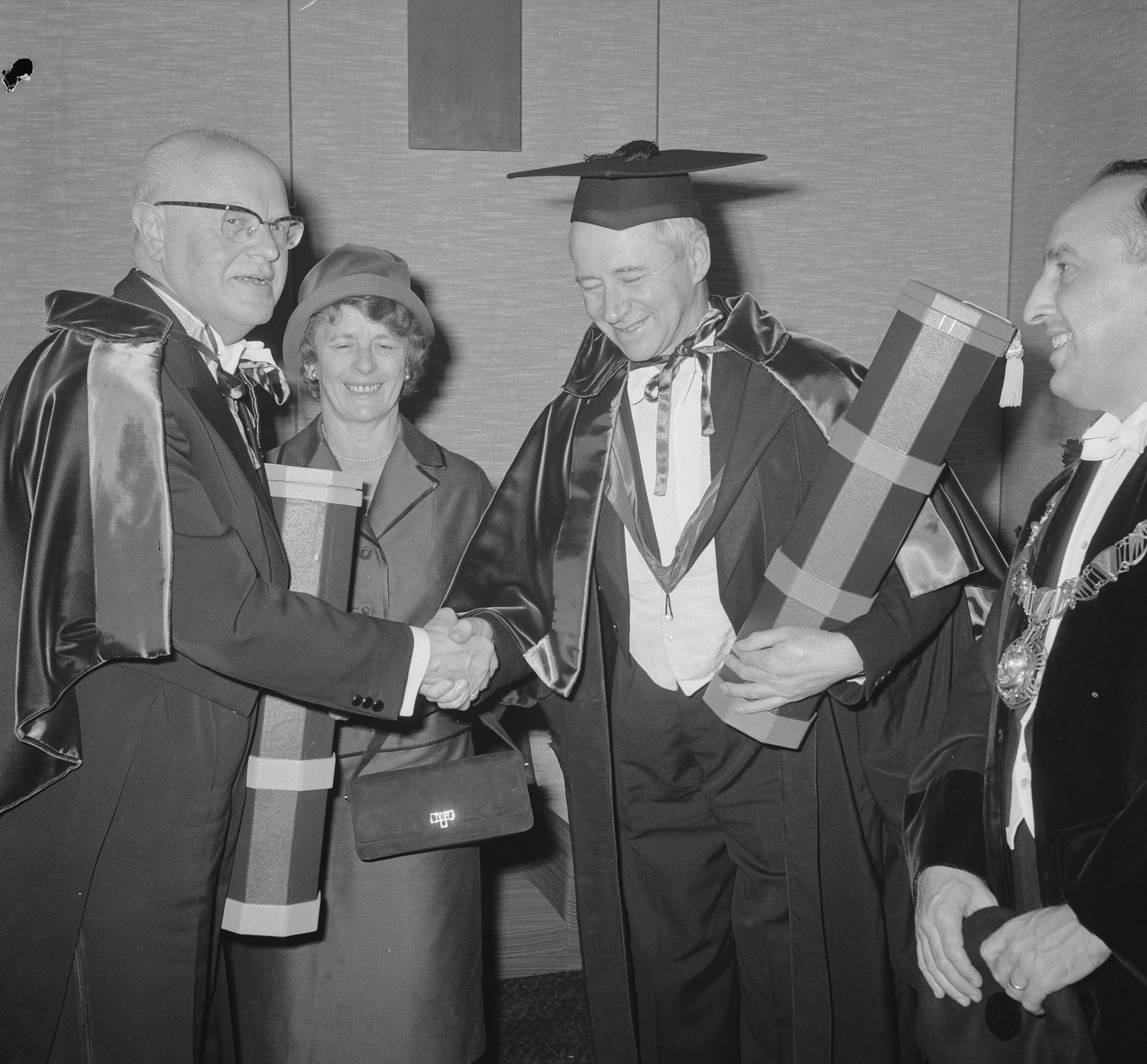
Carl Romme (left) and Clark receiving an honorary doctorate from Tilburg University in 1962. Clark's wife Marjorie stands between them.

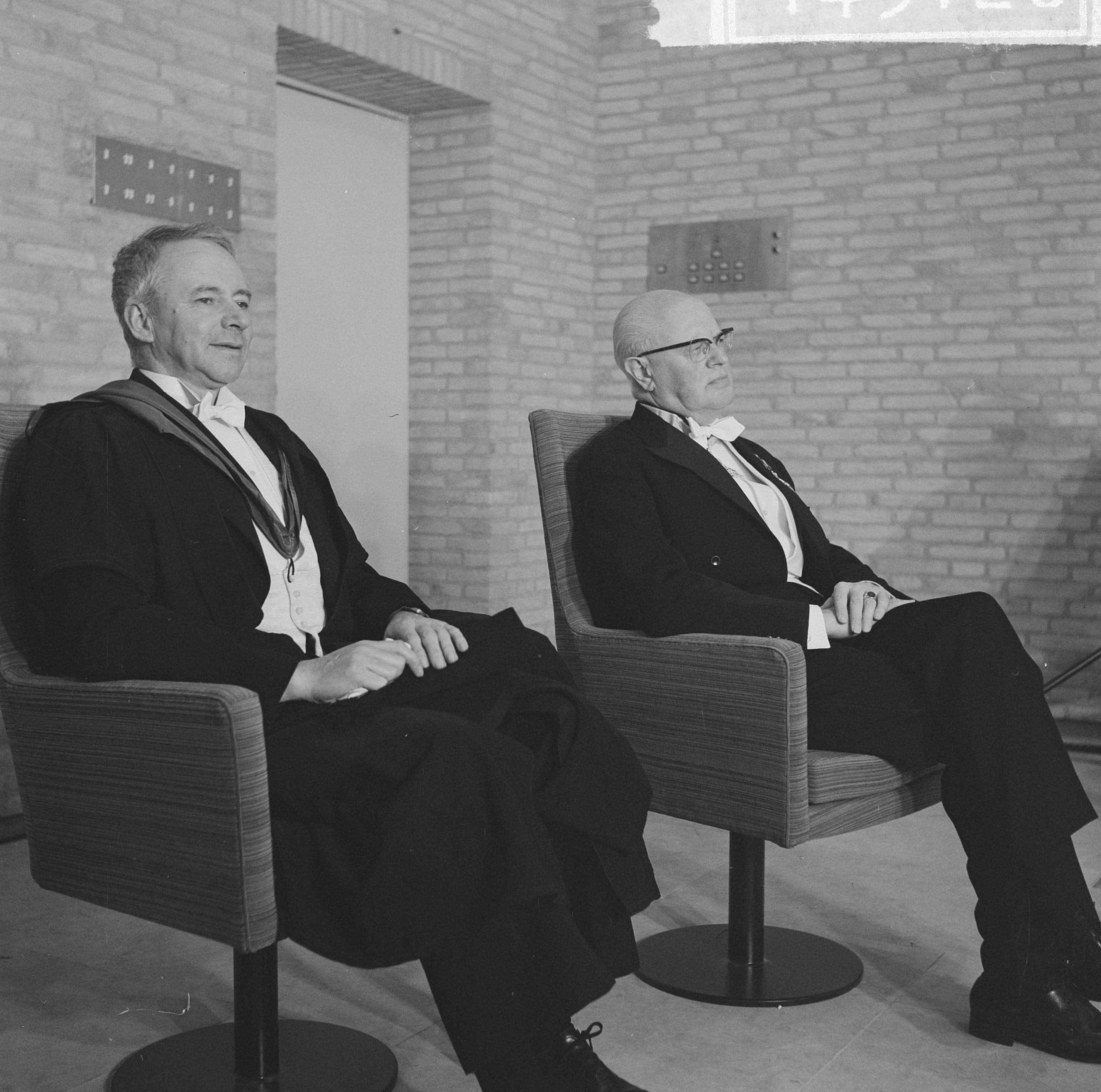
Clark (left) and Carl Romme on stage

In 1951 he took a secondment to the Food and Agriculture Organization in Rome, and then to the University of Chicago (1952), before taking the Directorship of the Agricultural Economics Research Institute (AERI) at Oxford University (1952–1969). He returned to Australia in 1969 as the Director of the Institute of Economic Progress at Monash University (1969–1978) and finally as a Research Consultant to the Department of Economics at the University of Queensland until his death in 1989.

He was on the Council of the Econometric Society from 1948 to 1952.

== Family ==
Clark married Marjorie Tattersall in 1935; they had eight sons and one daughter, who in turn produced a total of 50 grandchildren. His son Gregory became an author and academic in Japan. His nephew, born to his sister Margaret, is the cognitive psychologist and computer scientist Nobel Laureate Geoffrey Hinton.

Marjorie Tattersall's sister Viva Tattersall was a stage actress and Hollywood movie star.

== Death ==
Clark died in Brisbane, Australia, on 4 September 1989. He is buried together with his wife Marjorie at the Mount Gravatt Cemetery in Brisbane (Section 3B).

== Accolades ==
In 1984 he was named by the World Bank as one of the "pioneers of development" along with Sir Arthur Lewis, Gunnar Myrdal, W.W. Rostow and Jan Tinbergen.

In 1987 Clark was together with Professor Trevor Swan the first recipient of the Distinguished Fellow awards, presented by The Economic Society of Australia.

== Honours ==
- Fellow of the Econometric Society .
- Corresponding Fellow of the British Academy.
- Distinguished Fellow Award, The Economic Society of Australia.
- HonDEcon Tilburg University , DLitt Oxford University, HonDSc University of Milan, Hon DEcon Monash University , HonDEcon University of Queensland.
- Member of honor Hunky Dooly
- The Australasian Meeting of the Econometric Society has a Colin Clark Lecture at its meetings.
- A building at the University of Queensland is named for him, and it is reputed that a stone grotesque in the university's Great Court was also made in his likeness (G19).

== Publications ==
=== Papers ===
- "A System of Equations Explaining the United States Trade Cycle, 1921 to 1941", Econometrica, Vol. 17, No. 2 (April 1949), pp. 93–124
- "The Economic Functions of a City in Relation to Its Size", Econometrica, Vol. 13, No. 2 (April 1945), pp. 97–113
- "Economic Development in Communist China", The Journal of Political Economy, Vol. 84, No. 2 (April 1976), pp. 239–264
- "Theory of Economic Growth", Econometrica, Vol. 17, Supplement: Report of the Washington Meeting (July 1949), pp. 112–116
- "The Measurement of National Wealth: Discussion", (with Milton Gilbert; J. R. N. Stone; Francois Perroux; D. K. Lieu; Evelpides; Francois Divisia; Tinbergen; Kuznets; Smithies; Shirras; MacGregor), Econometrica, Vol. 17, Supplement: Report of the Washington Meeting. (July 1949), pp. 255–272
- "A Critique of Russian Statistics by Colin Clark", Economica, May 1941, NS 8, p. 212.
- "Russian Income and Production Statistics", The Review of Economics and Statistics, Vol. 29, No. 4 (November 1947), pp. 215–217.
- "Afterthoughts on Paley", The Review of Economics and Statistics, Vol. 36, No. 3 (August 1954), pp. 267–273.
- ""Mr. Colin Clark on the Limits of Taxation": A Rejoinder", The Review of Economics and Statistics, Vol. 36, No. 1 (February 1954), p. 101.
- "The New Board of Trade Indexes", The Economic Journal, Vol. 45, No. 178 (June 1935), pp. 370–375.
- "Determination of the Multiplier from National Income Statistics", The Economic Journal, Vol. 48, No. 191 (September 1938), pp. 435–448.
- "Public Finance and Changes in the Value of Money", The Economic Journal, Vol. 55, No. 220 (December 1945), pp. 371–389.
- "Further Data on the National Income", The Economic Journal, Vol. 44, No. 175 (September 1934), pp. 380–397.
- "The Value of the Pound", The Economic Journal, Vol. 59, No. 234 (June 1949), pp. 198–207.
- "National Income at Its Climax", The Economic Journal, Vol. 47, No. 186 (June 1937), pp. 308–320.
- "World Supply and Requirements of Farm Products", Journal of the Royal Statistical Society, Series A (General), Vol. 117, No. 3 (1954), pp. 263–296
- "Future Sources of Food Supply: Economic Problems", Journal of the Royal Statistical Society, Series A (General), Vol. 125, No. 3 (1962), pp. 418–448
- "Urban Population Densities", Journal of the Royal Statistical Society, Series A (General), Vol. 114, No. 4 (1951), pp. 490–496
- "The National Income and The Net Output of Industry", Journal of the Royal Statistical Society, Vol. 96, No. 4 (1933), pp. 651–659

=== Books ===
- The National Income, 1924–31, 1932
- The Economic Position of Great Britain, with A. C. Pigou, 1936
- National Income and Outlay, 1937
- A Critique of Russian Statistics, 1939
- Conditions of Economic Progress, 1940
- The Economics of 1960, 1942
- Statistical Society
- Australian Hopes and Fears, 1958
- Growthmanship, 1961
- Economics of Subsistence Agriculture, with M. R. Haswell, 1964 (second edition 1966, third edition 1967, fourth edition 1970)
- Population Growth and Land Use, 1967 (second edition 1977)
- Starvation or Plenty?, 1970
- The Myth of over Population and Why Population Growth Could Be Desirable, June 1975
- Poverty Before Politics, 1977
- The Economics of Irrigation with Ian D. Carruthers, 1981
- Regional and Urban Location, 1982
