= Quaternary sector of the economy =

Sector of an economy based on knowledge and skill

The quaternary sector of the economy is based upon the economic activity that is associated with either the intellectual or knowledge-based economy. This consists of information technology; media; research and development; information-based services, such as information-generation and information-sharing; and knowledge-based services such as consultation, entertainment, broadcasting, mass media, telecommunication, education, information technology, financial planning, blogging, and designing. Other definitions describe the quaternary sector as pure services. This may consist of the entertainment industry, to describe media and culture, and government. This may be classified into an additional quinary sector.

The term reflects the analysis of the three-sector model of the economy, in which the primary sector produces raw materials used by the secondary sector to produce goods, which are then distributed to consumers by the tertiary sector.

Contrary to this implied sequence, however, the quaternary sector does not process the output of the tertiary sector. It has only limited and indirect connections to the industrial economy characterized by the three-sector model.

In a modern economy, the generation, analysis and dissemination of information is important enough to warrant a separate sector instead of being a part of the tertiary sector. This sector evolves in well-developed countries where the primary and secondary sectors are a minority of the economy, and requires a highly educated workforce.

For example, the tertiary and quaternary sectors form the largest part of the UK economy, employing 76% of the workforce.

== See also ==
- Indigo Era
- Outline of industry
