= Minimum railway curve radius =

Concept in railway engineering

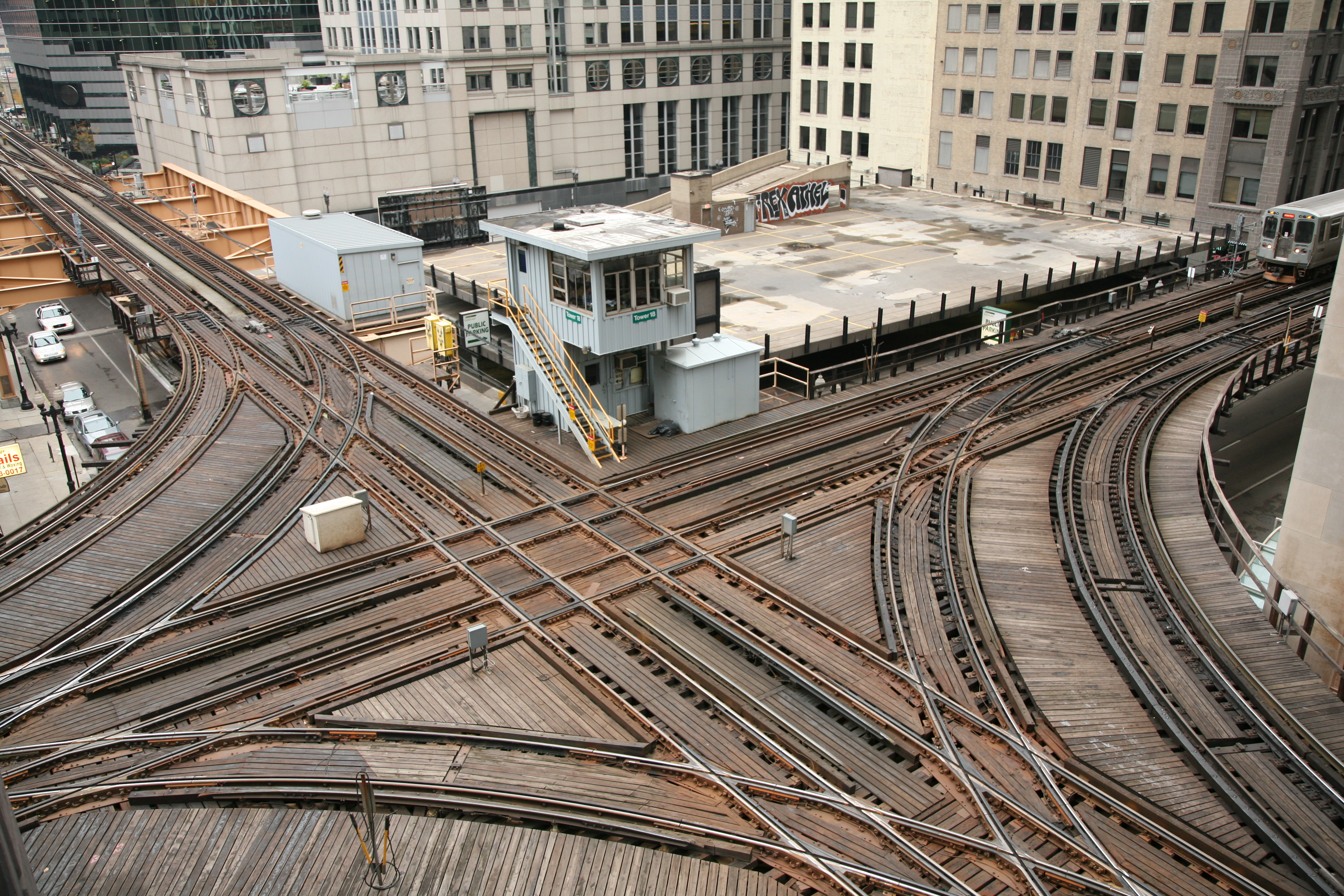
90-foot (27 m) radii on the elevated 4 ft 8 1/2 in (1,435 mm) standard gauge Chicago 'L'. There is no room for longer radii at this cross junction in the northwest corner of the Loop.

The minimum railway curve radius is the shortest allowable design radius for the centerline of railway tracks under a particular set of conditions. It has an important bearing on construction costs and operating costs and, in combination with superelevation (difference in elevation of the two rails) in the case of train tracks, determines the maximum safe speed of a curve. The minimum radius of a curve is one parameter in the design of railway vehicles as well as trams; monorails and automated guideways are also subject to a minimum radius.

== History ==
The first proper railway was the Liverpool and Manchester Railway, which opened in 1830. Like the tram roads that had preceded it over a hundred years, the L&M had gentle curves and gradients. Reasons for these gentle curves include the lack of strength of the track, which might have overturned if the curves were too sharp, causing derailments. Gentler curves increased visibility, boosting safety via increased situational awareness. The earliest rails were made in short lengths of wrought iron, which does not bend like later steel rails introduced in the 1850s.

== Factors affecting the minimum curve radius ==
Minimum curve radii for railways are governed by the speed operated and by the mechanical ability of the rolling stock to adjust to the curvature. In North America, equipment for unlimited interchange between railway companies is built to accommodate for a 288-foot (88 m) radius, but normally a 410-foot (125 m) radius is used as a minimum, as some freight carriages (freight cars) are handled by special agreement between railways that cannot take the sharper curvature. For the handling of long freight trains, a minimum 574-foot (175 m) radius is preferred.

The sharpest curves tend to be on the narrowest of narrow gauge railways, where almost all the equipment is proportionately smaller. Standard gauge can also have tight curves, if rolling stocks are built for it; however, this removes the standardisation benefit of standard gauge. Tramways can have below 100-foot (30 m) curve radius.

=== Steam locomotives ===
As the need for more powerful steam locomotives grew, the need for more driving wheels on a longer, fixed wheelbase grew too. However, long wheel bases do not cope well with curves of a small radius. Various types of articulated locomotives (e.g., Mallet, Garratt, Meyer & Fairlie) were devised to avoid having to operate multiple locomotives with multiple crews. For example, the narrow-gauge Tasmanian Government Railways K class Garratt locomotives operated on 99 ft (30 m) radius curves; in comparison, the larger Kenya and Uganda Railways' Beyer-Garratt locomotives were designed for 275 ft (84 m) radius curves.

More recent diesel and electric locomotives do not have a wheelbase problem, as they have flexible bogies, and also can easily be operated in multiple with a single crew.

=== Couplings ===
Not all couplers can handle very short radii. This is particularly true of the European buffers and chain couplers, where the buffers extend the length of the rail car body. For a line with a maximum speed of 60 km/h (37 mph), buffers increase the minimum radius to around 150 m (164 yd; 492 ft). As narrow-gauge railways, tramways, and rapid transit systems normally do not interchange with mainline railways, in Europe these often use bufferless central couplers and build to a tighter standard.

=== Train lengths ===
A long heavy freight train, especially those with wagons of mixed loading, may struggle on short radius curves, as the drawgear forces may pull intermediate wagons off the rails. Common solutions include:

- marshalling light and empty wagons at the rear of the train
- intermediate locomotives, including remotely controlled ones
- easing curves
- reduced speeds
- reduced cant (superelevation), at the expense of fast passenger trains
- more, shorter trains
- equalising wagon loading (often employed on unit trains)
- better driver training
- driving controls that display drawgear forces
- electronically controlled pneumatic brakes

A similar problem occurs with harsh changes in gradients (vertical curves).

=== Speed and cant ===
As a heavy train goes around a bend at speed, the reactive centrifugal force may cause negative effects: passengers and cargo may experience unpleasant forces, the inside and outside rails will wear unequally, and insufficiently anchored tracks may move. To counter this, a cant (superelevation) is used. Ideally, the train should be tilted such that resultant force acts vertically downwards through the bottom of the train, so the wheels, track, train and passengers feel little or no sideways force ("down" and "sideways" are given with respect to the plane of the track and train). Some trains are capable of tilting to enhance this effect for passenger comfort. Because freight and passenger trains tend to move at different speeds, a cant cannot be ideal for both types of rail traffic.

The relationship between speed and tilt can be calculated mathematically. Starting with the formula for a balancing centripetal force, where θ is the angle by which the train is tilted due to the cant, r is the curve radius in metres, v is the speed in metres per second, and g is the gravity of Earth, approximately 9.81 m/s²:
$$\tan\theta=\frac{v^2}{gr}.$$
Rearranging for r gives:
$$r=\frac{v^2}{g\tan\theta}.$$
Geometrically, tan θ can be expressed (using the small-angle approximation) in terms of the track gauge G, the cant h_{a} and cant deficiency h_{b}, all in millimetres:
$$\tan\theta\approx\sin\theta=\frac{h_a+h_b}{G}.$$
This approximation for tan θ gives:
$$r=\frac{v^2}{g\frac{h_a+h_b}{G}}=\frac{Gv^2}{g(h_a+h_b)}.$$
This table shows examples of curve radii. The values used when building high-speed railways vary, and depend on desired wear and safety levels.

Curve radius	120 km/h; 74 mph (33 m/s)	200 km/h; 130 mph (56 m/s)	250 km/h; 150 mph (69 m/s)	300 km/h; 190 mph (83 m/s)	350 km/h; 220 mph (97 m/s)	400 km/h; 250 mph (111 m/s)
Cant 160 mm (6.3 in), cant deficiency 100 mm (3.9 in), no tilting trains	630 m (2,070 ft)	1,800 m (5,900 ft)	2,800 m (9,200 ft)	4,000 m (13,000 ft)	5,400 m (17,700 ft)	7,000 m (23,000 ft)
Cant 160 mm (6.3 in), cant deficiency 200 mm (7.9 in), with tilting trains	450 m (1,480 ft)	1,300 m (4,300 ft)	2,000 m (6,600 ft)	Information unavailable		

Tramways typically do not exhibit cant, due to the low speeds involved. Instead, they use the outer grooves of rails as a guide in tight curves.

== Transition curves ==
A curve should not become a straight all at once, but should gradually increase in radius over time (a distance of around 40–80 m (130–260 ft) for a line with a maximum speed of about 100 km/h (62 mph)). Even sharper than curves with no transition are reverse curves with no intervening straight track. The superelevation must also be transitioned. Higher speeds require longer transitions.

== Vertical curves ==
As a train negotiates a curve, the force it exerts on the track changes. Too tight a 'crest' curve could result in the train leaving the track as it drops away beneath it; too tight a 'trough' and the train will plough downwards into the rails and damage them. More precisely, the support force R exerted by the track on a train as a function of the curve radius r, the train mass m, and the speed v, is given by
$$R=mg\plusmn\frac{mv^2}{r},$$
with the second term positive for troughs, negative for crests. For passenger comfort the ratio of the gravitational acceleration g to the centripetal acceleration v^{2}/r needs to be kept as small as possible, else passengers will feel large changes in their weight.

As trains cannot climb steep slopes, they have little occasion to go over significant vertical curves. However, high-speed trains are sufficiently high-powered that steep slopes are preferable to the reduced speed necessary to navigate horizontal curves around obstacles, or the higher construction costs necessary to tunnel through or bridge over them. High Speed 1 (section 2) in the UK has a minimum vertical curve radius of 10,000 m (32,808 ft) and High Speed 2, with the higher speed of 400 km/h (250 mph), stipulates much larger 56,000 m (183,727 ft) radii. In both these cases the experienced change in weight is less than 7%.

Rail well cars also risk low clearance at the tops of tight crests.

== Problem curves ==
- The Australian Standard Garratt had flangeless leading driving wheels that tended to cause derailments on sharp curves.
- Sharp curves on the Port Augusta to Hawker line of the South Australian Railways caused derailment problems when bigger and heavier X class locomotives were introduced, requiring realignments to ease the curves.
- 5-chain (101 m; 330 ft) curves on the Oberon, Batlow, and Dorrigo lines in New South Wales limited steam locomotives to the 0-6-0 Z19 class.

== List of selected minimum curve radii ==
Radius	Location	Gauge	Notes
8,000 m (26,247 ft)	Japan	N/A (maglev)	Chūō Shinkansen (505 km/h [314 mph])
7,000 m (22,966 ft)	Chinese high speed railway network	1,435 mm (4 ft 8 1/2 in)	350 km/h [220 mph]
5,500 m (18,045 ft)	Chinese high speed railway network	1,435 mm (4 ft 8 1/2 in)	250–300 km/h [160–190 mph]
4,000 m (13,123 ft)	Chinese high speed railway network	1,435 mm (4 ft 8 1/2 in)	300 km/h [190 mph]
3,500 m (11,483 ft)	Chinese high speed railway network	1,435 mm (4 ft 8 1/2 in)	200–250 km/h [120–160 mph]
2,000 m (6,562 ft)	Chinese high speed railway network	1,435 mm (4 ft 8 1/2 in)	200 km/h [120 mph]
1,200 m (3,937 ft)	Africa	1,435 mm (4 ft 8 1/2 in)	Typical of medium-speed railways (120 km/h [75 mph]) Passenger
1,200 m (3,937 ft)	Africa	1,435 mm (4 ft 8 1/2 in)	Typical of medium-speed railways (80 km/h [50 mph]) Freight
800 m (2,625 ft)	Africa	1,435 mm (4 ft 8 1/2 in)	Typical of medium-speed railways (120 km/h [75 mph]) Passenger
800 m (2,625 ft)	Africa	1,435 mm (4 ft 8 1/2 in)	Typical of medium-speed railways (80 km/h [50 mph]) Freight
250 m (820 ft)	DRCongo Matadi–Kinshasa Railway	1,067 mm (3 ft 6 in)	Deviated 1,067 mm (3 ft 6 in) line.
240 m (787 ft)	Border Loop	1,435 mm (4 ft 8 1/2 in)	5,000 long tons (5,100 t; 5,600 short tons) - 1,500 m (4,921 ft)
200 m (656 ft)	Wollstonecraft station, Sydney	1,435 mm (4 ft 8 1/2 in)	
200 m (656 ft)	Homebush triangle	1,435 mm (4 ft 8 1/2 in)	5,000 long tons (5,100 t; 5,600 short tons) - 1,500 m (4,921 ft)
190 m (623 ft)	Turkey	1,435 mm (4 ft 8 1/2 in)	
175 m (574 ft 1 3/4 in)	Indian Railways	1,676 mm (5 ft 6 in)	
175 m (574 ft 1 3/4 in)	North American rail network	1,435 mm (4 ft 8 1/2 in)	Preferred minimum on freight main lines
160 m (525 ft)	Lithgow Zig Zag	1,435 mm (4 ft 8 1/2 in)	40 km/h
125 m (410 ft 1 1/4 in)	North American rail network	1,435 mm (4 ft 8 1/2 in)	Minimum radius for general service
120 m (390 ft)	Bay Area Rapid Transit	1,676 mm (5 ft 6 in)	
90 m (295 ft)	Batlow, New South Wales	1,435 mm (4 ft 8 1/2 in)	Rolling stock limited to 500 long tons (510 t; 560 short tons) and 300 m (984 ft) - restricted to NSW Z19 class 0-6-0 steam locomotives
95 m (312 ft)	Newmarket, New Zealand	1,067 mm (3 ft 6 in)	Extra heavy concrete sleepers
87.8 m (288 ft 11/16 in)	North American rail network	1,435 mm (4 ft 8 1/2 in)	Absolute minimum radius; not on lines for general service
85 m (279 ft)	Windberg Railway (de:Windbergbahn)	1,435 mm (4 ft 8 1/2 in)	Between Freital-Birkigt and Dresden-Gittersee – restrictions to wheelbase
80 m (262 ft)	Queensland Railways	1,067 mm (3 ft 6 in)	Central Line between Bogantungan and Hannam's Gap
70 m (230 ft)	JFK Airtrain	1,435 mm (4 ft 8 1/2 in)	
68.6 m (225 ft 13/16 in)	Washington Metro	4 ft 8 1/4 in (1,429 mm)	
61 m (200 ft)	London Underground Central line	1,435 mm (4 ft 8 1/2 in)	Between White City and Shepherd's Bush
53 m (174 ft)	New York City Subway	1,435 mm (4 ft 8 1/2 in)	Several 175-foot curves of the BMT Eastern Division do not permit the 75-foot cars through them
50 m (160 ft)	Gotham Curve	1,435 mm (4 ft 8 1/2 in)	Cromford and High Peak Railway, Derbyshire, England until 1967
50 m (160 ft)	Matadi-Kinshasa Railway	762 mm (2 ft 6 in)	Original 762 mm (2 ft 6 in) line.
50 m (160 ft)	Welsh Highland Railway	600 mm (1 ft 11 5/8 in)	
45 m (148 ft)	Bernina Railway	1,000 mm (3 ft 3 3/8 in)	
40 m (131 ft)	Welsh Highland Railway	600 mm (1 ft 11 5/8 in)	On original line at Beddgelert
40 m (131 ft)	Victorian Narrow Gauge	762 mm (2 ft 6 in)	16 km/h or 10 mph on curves (32 km/h or 20 mph on straightaways)
37.47 m or 122 ft 11 3/16 in (48°)	Kalka-Shimla Railway	762 mm (2 ft 6 in)	
30 m (98 ft)	Metromover	N/A (monorail)	Rubber-tired, monorail-guided light rail downtown people mover system.
29 m (95 ft)	New York City Subway	1,435 mm (4 ft 8 1/2 in)	
27 m (89 ft)	Chicago 'L'	1,435 mm (4 ft 8 1/2 in)	
25 m (82 ft)	Sydney Steam Motor Tram; 0-4-0	1,435 mm (4 ft 8 1/2 in)	Hauling 3 trailers
25 m (82 ft)	Luas	1,435 mm (4 ft 8 1/2 in)	
22 m (72 ft)	Warsaw Commuter Railway	1,435 mm (4 ft 8 1/2 in)	Depot tracks in Grodzisk Mazowiecki, Poland
21.2 m (69 ft 6 5/8 in)	Darjeeling Himalayan Railway	610 mm (2 ft)	Sharpest curves were originally 13.7 m (44 ft 11 3/8 in)
18.25 m (59 ft 10 1/2 in)	Matheran Hill Railway	610 mm (2 ft)	1 in 20 (5%); 8 km/h or 5 mph on curve; 20 km/h or 12 mph on straight
15.24 m (50 ft 0 in)	Streetcars in New Orleans	1,588 mm (5 ft 2 1/2 in)	Revenue service
8.53 m (27 ft 11 13/16 in)	Streetcars in New Orleans	1,588 mm (5 ft 2 1/2 in)	Yard tracks
13.11 m (43 ft 1/8 in)	San Francisco Municipal Railway	1,435 mm (4 ft 8 1/2 in)	Light rail, former streetcar system
10.973 m (36 ft 0 in)	Toronto Streetcar System	1,495 mm (4 ft 10 7/8 in)	
10.67 m (35 ft 1/16 in)	Taunton Tramway	1,067 mm (3 ft 6 in)	
10.058 m (33 ft 0 in)	Boston Green Line	1,435 mm (4 ft 8 1/2 in)	
10.06 m (33 ft 1/16 in)	Newark Light Rail	1,435 mm (4 ft 8 1/2 in)	
4.9 m (16 ft 15/16 in)	Chicago Tunnel Company	610 mm (2 ft)	6.1 m (20 ft 3/16 in) in grand unions. Not in use.

== See also ==
- Breakover angle
- Category:Articulated locomotives
- Degree of curvature, civil engineering
- Lateral motion device
- Longest trains
- Matheran Hill Railway
- Radius
- Radius of curvature (applications)
- Railway systems engineering
- Track transition curve
- Turning radius
