= New South Wales Z19 class locomotive =

Class of Australian 0-6-0 locomotives

New South Wales Z19 class
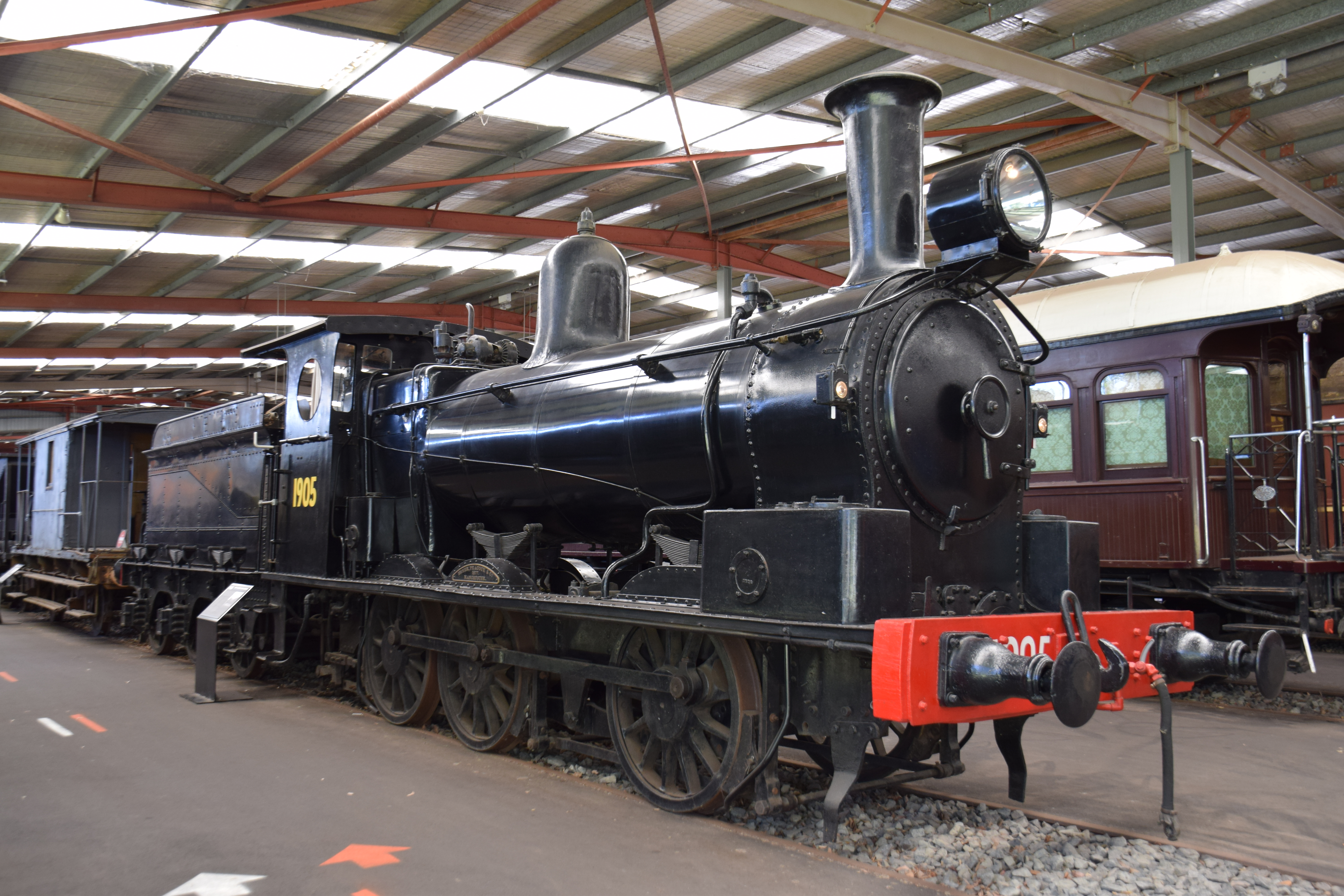
- 1905 at the NSW Rail Museum, Thirlmere
Type and origin
- Power type: Steam
- Builder: Beyer, Peacock & Company; Henry Vale
- Build date: 1877–1891
- Total produced: 80
Specifications
- Configuration
  - Whyte: 0-6-0
- Gauge: 1,435 mm (4 ft 8 1/2 in) standard gauge
- Driver dia.: 4 ft 1/2 in (1,232 mm)
- Loco weight: Original: 75,000 lb (34,000 kg); Rebuilt: 84,000 lb (38,000 kg)
- Fuel type: Coal
- Firebox
  - Grate area: Original: 14 sq ft (1.3 m^{2}); Rebuilt: 18 sq ft (1.7 m^{2})
- Boiler pressure: Original: 130 psi (0.90 MPa); Rebuilt: 150 psi (1.03 MPa)
- Heating surface: Original: 1,275 sq ft (118.5 m^{2}); Rebuilt: 1,320 sq ft (123 m^{2})
- Cylinders: 2 inside
- Cylinder size: 18 in × 24 in (457 mm × 610 mm)
Performance figures
- Tractive effort: Original: 17,900 lbf (79.6 kN); Rebuilt: 20,655 lbf (91.9 kN)
Career
- Operators: New South Wales Government Railways
- Preserved: 1904, 1905, 1919, 1923
- Disposition: 4 preserved, 76 scrapped

The New South Wales Z19 class is a class of 0-6-0 steam locomotives operated by the New South Wales Government Railways of Australia.

== History ==
By 1877, the main lines in New South Wales were nearing Tamworth, Wagga Wagga and Orange. The additional distances required an increase in motive power, especially as at that time, locomotives were changed after quite short journeys. They were only in service when manned by their regular crew.

Between 1877 and 1881, the initial order of 50 of these 0-6-0 wheel arrangement locomotives were delivered from Beyer, Peacock & Company. Between 1880 and 1891, Beyer, Peacock delivered a further nine, and Sydney manufacturer Henry Vale, 18.

These locomotives could haul 128 t (126.0 long tons; 141.1 short tons) at 11–13 km/h (6.8–8.1 mph) over the Blue Mountains line. William Thow, the then Locomotive Engineer of the South Australian Railways, was commissioned by the New South Wales Government Railways in 1888 to enquire into the locomotives and rolling stock. He recommended modifications to this class as he considered them to be the best designed and proportioned of the locomotives then in service. This included Belpaire boilers and new cabs.

Following the reclassification of locomotives in 1891, three additional similar locomotives were added to the class. With the arrival of the T class saw the class relegated to secondary roles and coal services in Newcastle. Between April 1902 and February 1910, fourteen were converted to 20 class 2-6-4 tank engines at Eveleigh Railway Workshops. By 1933 many had been withdrawn, with only 36 remaining in service. Some were sold for further use, including 1918 to Australian Iron & Steel.

Having a short wheelbase and no leading bogie, the locomotives had a tendency to derail and they were ultimately restricted to a maximum speed of 40 km/h (25 mph) and relegated to shunting and branch line traffic. Driven slowly, they could negotiate the most appalling curves and badly maintained or unballasted tracks. They were therefore ideal in goods yards, such as Darling Harbour and Port Waratah with the last two withdrawn from the latter in August 1972. Branch lines such as those to Dorrigo, Batlow and Oberon where grades of up to 1 in 25 (4%) and curves as sharp as 100.6 m (5 chains) radius could be encountered were ideal for this class and these were the only locomotives permitted on these lines until dieselisation.

== Preservation ==
Four have been preserved:

- 1904 by the Dorrigo Steam Railway & Museum, Dorrigo
- 1905 by the NSW Rail Museum, Thirlmere
- 1919 by the Lachlan Vintage Village, Forbes, sold to Dorrigo Steam Railway & Museum November 1986, transferred to Glenreagh Mountain Railway, Glenreagh in 2001
- 1923 by the Dorrigo Steam Railway & Museum, Dorrigo
