= Line of business =

Business term

Line of business (LOB) is a general term which refers to a product or a set of related products that serve a particular customer transaction or business need. In some industry sectors, like insurance, "line of business" also has a regulatory and accounting definition to meet a statutory set of insurance policies. It may or may not be a strategically relevant business unit.

"Line of business" often refers to an internal corporate business unit, whereas the term "industry" refers to an external view that includes all competitors competing in a similar market. A line of business will often examine its position within an industry using a Porter five forces analysis (or other industry-analysis method) and other relevant industry information.

== Computer applications ==
In the context of computing, a "line-of-business application" is one of the set of critical computer applications perceived as vital to running an enterprise. For example:

"Governance has become the hot topic in SOA over the past year. As companies' SOA usage becomes real, widespread and line-of-business, the requirement to ensure that the systems are properly governed has emerged as the number one concern for SOA adopters."

== Mobile LOB ==
Mobile LOB refers to LOB applications running on mobile computers or PDAs - usually rugged for use in the field to process transaction at the site of the customer with minimum usage of paper.

Mobile route accounting exemplifies a typical mobile application.

== See also ==
- Industry classification
- North American Industry Classification System (NAICS)
- North American Product Classification System (NAPCS)
- Standard Industrial Classification (SIC)
