= North American Transportation Statistics Interchange =

North American Transportation Statistics
- Abbreviation: NATS, BDTAN
- Formation: 1991
- Purpose: Transportation Statistics Information Exchange
- Region served: North America
- Members: Canada, Mexico, United States
- Official language: English, French, Spanish
- Main organ: U.S. Census Bureau, U.S. Department of Transportation, U.S. Army Corps of Engineers, Statistics Canada, Transport Canada, Secretaría de Comunicaciones y Transportes, Instituto Mexicano de Transporte, Instituto Nacional de Estadística y Geografía
- Website: http://nats.sct.gob.mx

The North American Transportation Statistics Interchange, established in 1991, is a trilateral forum of government officials from transportation and statistical agencies of the United States, Canada, and Mexico. The purpose of the NATS Interchange is to share information on how to collect, analyze, and publish transportation data; to improve comparability among data programs of the three nations; and to provide North American statistics on transportation. To accomplish this, officials meet on an annual basis in the context of Interchange meetings being held alternately in Canada, Mexico, and the United States. Participating agencies include the U.S. Census Bureau, the U.S. Department of Transportation, the U.S. Army Corps of Engineers, Statistics Canada, Transport Canada, the Mexican Ministry of Communications and Transport (SCT), the Mexican Institute of Transportation (IMT) (http://www.imt.mx), and the National Institute of Statistics and Geography (INEGI) of Mexico.

== The North American Transportation Statistics (NATS) Online Database ==
The NATS Online Database is a product of the NATS Interchange. Publications of the Interchange are available at: http://nats.sct.gob.mx/en/

== See also ==
- Bureau of Transportation Statistics
- North American Industry Classification System
- North American Product Classification System
