= East Maitland–Morpeth railway line =

Former railway line in New South Wales

The East Maitland–Morpeth railway is a closed branch railway in New South Wales, Australia.

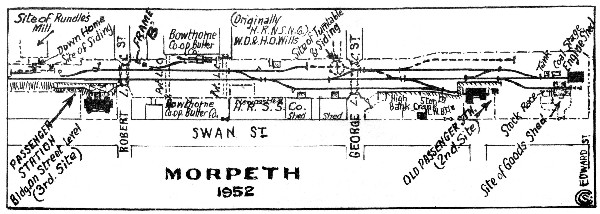

== Early history ==
St Michael was a seagoing ship that traded between New South Wales and Pacific Islands in the early 1820s. In 1826 some Sydney merchants converted the vessel into a store ship and moored it in the Hunter River at Morpeth. Goods of every description were sold and farm produce stored until taken by other ships to Sydney markets. St Michael was the only such facility at Morpeth for several years.

Commencing with the mooring of St. Michael storeship at the head of navigation of the Hunter River at what was then known as Green Hills, Morpeth came into being as a port for vessels of deep draught of those days. The Australasian Steam Navigation Company and the Hunter River New Steam Navigation Company had each established large efficient shed and wharfage accommodation, where cargoes brought in by teams and droghers from the upper navigable reaches of the Hunter and Paterson Rivers were loaded into ocean-going vessels. It should be kept in mind that Newcastle, at this time, had no port facilities for general cargoes, being merely a loading point for small colliers of light draught, while the road between Maitland and Newcastle, as a means of access, was practically impassable.

The opening of the first section of railway between Newcastle and East Maitland in 1857 and its subsequent extension further up the Hunter River was watched carefully by the residents of the two Maitlands and the rural properties on the river, resulting in the commencement of an agitation for the construction of a railway linking the Northern line with Morpeth for the more ready handling of the rich local products for shipment to the Sydney and Intercolonial markets.

On the 1861 Estimates, before Parliament late in 1860, was a sum of £20,000 for the extension of the Great Northern Railway from Maitland to Morpeth. However, during the debate, the sum was disallowed and for the time being Government building of the line was in abeyance. With this postponement of Government activity in mind, a locally formed company, styled the Maitland and Morpeth Railway Company, presented a Bill to Parliament asking for authority to build a line three-quarters of a mile longer than the proposed Government line, which was to terminate at Queen's Wharf. This proposal also did not receive the necessary Parliamentary sanction but, such was the pressure brought to bear, the Government later undertook to construct the line and compensated the company for the use of its plans and specifications.

A contract was let to Joseph Martindale in May 1862, for the principal works of the construction of the line, at a cost of £8,846.10.1, from a junction with the Great Northern line at Pitnacree Road level crossing, East Maitland, for a distance of 2m. 52c. The public was incensed, considering they were tricked, as this meant that the railway would not extend beyond Queen's Wharf and thus completely failed to give the desired connection between the Northern line and the steamer wharves. The excuses given were that to carry the line to a high-level site in Morpeth would be too expensive and that the Australasian Steam Navigation Company refused to permit a rail connection to pass through its land to its rival, the Hunter River New Steam Navigation Company. A spur line was, however, to be taken to the waterfront at Queen's Wharf for the loading of coal into small colliers.

== Construction commences ==
The first sod was turned on 18 June 1862 and the work was proceeded with. Benjamin Ventors took over Martindale's cancelled contract to provide and lay the permanent way and ballast and the section was finally opened for traffic on 2 May 1864. It was opened when the New South Wales Railways had only three short lines, i.e. Sydney to Penrith, Granville to Picton and Newcastle to Singleton.

The arrangements at Morpeth Junction on the Northern line were decidedly primitive, being merely a single connection facing North for the junction, with an engine run-round on the branch, so situated that branch engines had to foul the main line when reversing. Two narrow 250feet timber platforms served the main and branch lines in the form of a "V", with a small booking office and store, lamp and waiting rooms, placed in the apex.

There were no intermediate platforms or sidings and the terminus had a 212 feet brick platform on the Up side with a low iron building, being situated some 12 chains before reaching the site of Queen's Wharf platform of later years. There was a run-round loop, 450 feet in length, and a dead-end dock siding at the terminal end. The brickwork of the dock is still visible near the large quarry, from which the stone for the many fine buildings in the town was taken. A siding turned away towards the river bank rising on an embankment thence to a trestle crossing over the extension of Steamer Street and terminating in coal staiths at the Queen's Wharf.

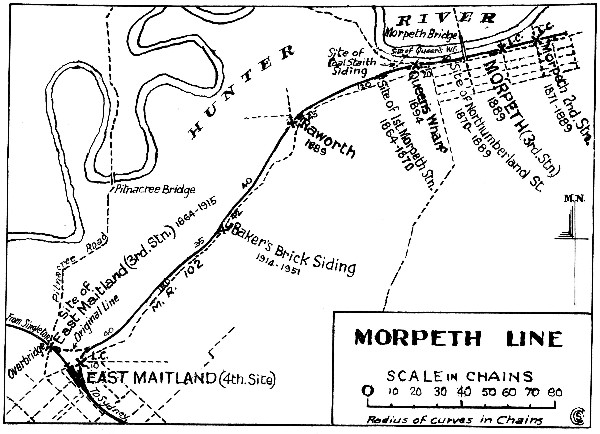

The local populace maintained their persistent agitation, which at length bore fruit, as the Government let a contract to William Pendall on 1 July 1867, to construct an extension of 63¾ chains, terminating at Edward Street. Opened for traffic in May 1870, the new terminal station was located centrally between George and Edward Streets and consisted of a 120 feet brick platform with stone coping, a brick station building and Station Master's residence combined, with a dock siding at the Maitland end. There was a run-round loop opposite the platform and a loop siding between Robert Street and George Street level crossings for the two shipping companies.

To serve the Maitland end of the town, a narrow platform was brought into use at the same time, immediately on the Maitland side of Northumberland Street, wedged against the face of the rock cutting some 20 feet below Swan Street and approached by a steep pathway. As this platform proved the more popular, a new brick station building was erected in 1876, on the top of the cutting at street level and connected to the platform by a steep flight of brick steps. Though abandoned some 15 years later, the building still remains as the rear portion of a residence, which was erected on the street alignment in front, and the stepway has become a drain. These steps must not be confused with the fine stone stepway on the terminal side of Northumberland Street bridge, which actually gave access between the large stone warehouse above, now flats, and a wharf on the river front, over a pedestrian level crossing, both of which have long since disappeared.

In 1877, an engine shed with water tank was erected at the dead-end of the line beyond the second Morpeth station. In 1878, a 60 feet x 27 feet brick goods shed was erected adjacent to the engine shed, with a goods siding which extended from the dock past a high timber-faced wool bank to beyond the George Street crossing. A stock race was added in 1882. In 1880, a siding was laid in to serve Bundle's Flour-Mill. In 1904, the siding was still in existence but was known as Eales’ Duckenfield siding, the large stone building having been converted into a warehouse. Both building and siding have long since vanished,

In 1878, new buildings were provided at Morpeth Junction, which had by then become the third East Maitland station and with the main line duplication in 1881, the junction arrangements there were enlarged.

The two stations, Northumberland Street and Morpeth, at opposite ends of Swan Street, were expensive to work with duplicate manning and as neither building was convenient nor adequate for public or staff, a new large brick station building was erected immediately on the Maitland side of Robert Street at Swan Street level on the site of the old Globe Inn, while a platform with brick facing was installed at the foot of steps, an awning covering portion of the platform. This became the third Morpeth station, when opened on 1 October 1889, while Northumberland Street and the second Morpeth station beyond George Street, were simultaneously closed, although trains still proceeded to the old second station for reversing. On the same date, a platform was opened at Raworth.

While the Morpeth branch was operated under Train Staff and Ticket regulations from early days, it is interesting to relate that an experimental installation of Webb and Thompson's Electric Staff was tried out on the line from 26 November 1891, for a short period.

== Working of line by steam trams ==
The year 1895 ushered in an economic depression and the railways of the Colony were hard hit. In an endeavour to reduce working expenses, it was decided to experiment with the use of steam tram motors and cars with railway contour wheels and a motor with trailer car, also dummy truck with dual tramway and railway couplings, were brought from Sydney for this purpose. The railway service was replaced by trams on 1 August 1895, the trams conveying goods vehicles as required. Everything proving satisfactory, this working was continued for the next 20 years.

A crossover was added near the terminus at Morpeth, giving a very short run-round for the rapid reversal of the dummy, and the crossover still remains, looking rather absurd to the casual observer.

The tram motors were under the control of the Tramway Department, but a railway fireman was required to ride on the motors on the several trips a day, run over the main Northern line between East and West Maitland. On Sundays, the service was conducted by railway suburban train and crew from Newcastle, the trams remaining resting at Morpeth. Goods trucks were conveyed by mixed trams, up to 12 being allowed with one car and 18 for special goods trams, equalling 162 tons; the grades between West Maitland and Morpeth being very light. Marshalling of mixed trams was:- motor, dummy, car, dummy, trucks, van, or if only three trucks, no van was necessary.

== Reversion to railway operation ==
Tramway working was abandoned as from 28 July 1915, and the engines used were the 4-4-2T-type of the M-40 (later Z-11) class with American-type cars, but tramway type working was retained insofar as the single engineman was concerned. With the retirement of the M-40 class, engines of the Z-20 class (2-6-4T) worked the line exclusively thereafter.

A waiting shed was brought into use at Queen's Wharf on 5 January 1894, the trams stopping with the car on the level crossing of Steamer Street, the platform not being added until the resumption of railway operation in 1915.

The present day Northumberland Street bridge over the Hunter River to Phoenix Park and Clarence Town was opened on 15 June 1898, and this limited navigation above that point to craft without masts. As a result, the Queen's Wharf ceased to exist and only a few broken piles mark this once busy spot.

A loop siding was opened for Baker's Brickworks on 19 May 1914, on the Up side of the line between East Maitland and Raworth, a spur siding leading across the Morpeth Road into the brickworks. It was closed on 3 July 1951.

On 26 September 1915, the East Maitland third station was closed and replaced by a fourth station nearer Sydney as part of the Waratah to East Maitland Coal Road quadruplication. The Morpeth line was therefore reversed to join the Northern line in front of the Court House, with points facing South and the branch trains were dealt with at a low level platform. The goods yard was transferred to the old third station site and the Morpeth engine was employed as necessary to shunt and transfer the goods yard traffic to and from the passenger station between trips.

The Bowthorne Co-operative Butter Company established a large factory on the old Australasian Steam Navigation Company's site and built a siding in 1917, but the property has been sold and no rail traffic had been handled for some time.

The principal traffic handled on the Morpeth line was wool, growing from 16,564 bales in 1872 to the amazing total of 82,361 bales in 1899. In the 1920s, however, this traffic commenced to decline considerably, a large quantity being diverted to Sydney. In more recent years, the improvements to general shipping at Lee Wharf, Newcastle, and the establishment of wool stores close by, gave Morpeth a knock-out blow.

Shoaling of the lower Hunter River and the expansion of road haulage put an end to the river trade between Morpeth and Newcastle and on 1 August 1951, the Newcastle and Hunter River Steam Ship Company closed its siding with its queer truck turntable leading on to either of two sidings, at right angles to the railway, demolishing its large sheds and wharves on the river side of the line. The company's large iron sheds on the town side of the line still remain and have been leased to various firms from time to time. Prescott's have used one of these sheds as a store.

W. D. & H. O. Wills established a tobacco factory in recent years on the old Newcastle & Hunter River Company's site and used the old siding, but the works are now closed.

== A trip on the line ==
As there was only one man on the footplate on this branch, the locomotive always faced Newcastle so that the driver could "spot" the cars at the two intermediate short platforms on the Up side. Being worked as a "tram", a porter acted as guard and also sold tickets en route from a portable ticket rack carried with the train and collected all tickets in transit.

Vigorously whistling for the ill-famed Melbourne Street open level crossing, the train left East Maitland and rounding the 1O chain curve, followed the Morpeth Road along the edge of the finest lucerne flats in the State, the rich black soil being renewed by the periodic floods as in the case of the Nile Valley in Egypt.

The train ambled quietly along a narrow fenced right-of-way with easy curves and grades, passing Bakers Brickworks a little over a mile out where there was once a siding, and in another three-quarters of a mile passed Raworth timber platform with waiting shed on the Up side just beyond an open level crossing with cattle stops. Another three-quarters of a mile and Queen's Wharf timber platform was passed with waiting shed queerly placed at ground level, between the platform ramp and the Steamer Street open crossing. The Hunter River appeared on the Down side, but all signs of the actual wharf had gone except for a few piles which could only be seen by examining the river bank closely,

Sleepy old Morpeth then came into view, quietly resting on the top of its rocky bluff parallel with the river bank, for the glory of this once thriving deep-water town had departed, and with it the bustle and movement of the port of the Hunter and Paterson basins. The railway made a quick reverse to line up with the rear of the Swan Street buildings and ran along a shelf cut out of the rock face, passing under the shore span of the large road bridge over the Hunter at Northumberland Street, Morpeth.

Morpeth terminal platform, which was situated immediately before passing over Robert Street level crossing (with gates), had an awning only, as the commodious brick station building was upstairs at the Swan Street level, some 10 feet above. The line continued some 55 chains further to the dead-end, which was uniquely situated in the engine shed, while several small tanks on a pig-sty stand provided the watering facilities for the engine. There was also a small coal stage nearby, and the occasional single truck of loco coal was the only goods traffic then conveyed. The trains continued through the yard over George Street level crossing, which also had gates, to reverse. Beyond the station officer, there were no operating employees at Morpeth, the driver on shift doing the fuelling and all necessary shed work.

All the safe working was on the primitive side, the line being operated under Staff and Ticket regulations, although it must have been a long time since a ticket was issued. A landmark covered the approach to the solitary Down home signal, which latter was operated from a single lever on the platform, the wire running along between the pegs from the lever to the ramp, on the surface of the platform itself. The only gesture towards Interlocking otherwise was a two-lever frame operating the points and catch points of the Bowthorne Butter Siding, but even then the key was kept in the office.

A train departs Morpeth for East Maitland	The Hunter River and Morpeth Station	Morpeth Station

== Demise ==
With constant improvement in roads and the vehicles upon them, continued operation of such a short branch was, economically, quite unjustifiable. The river trade was long gone and its last local source of goods traffic, the butter factory, declined rapidly from mid 1952. The line closed on 31 August 1953.
