= NAICS 11 =

NAICS sector 11 (abbreviated to NAICS 11) is a sub-classification of economic activity that covers agriculture, forestry, fishing and hunting in the North American Industry Classification System (NAICS) system in Canada, the United States and Mexico.

The Agriculture, Forestry, Fishing and Hunting sector comprises establishments primarily engaged in growing crops, raising animals, harvesting timber, and harvesting fish and other animals from a farm, ranch, or their natural habitats.

The establishments in this sector are often described as farms, ranches, dairies, greenhouses, nurseries, orchards, or hatcheries. A farm may consist of a single tract of land or a number of separate tracts which may be held under different tenures. For example, one tract may be owned by the farm operator and another rented. It may be operated by the operator alone or with the assistance of members of the household or hired employees, or it may be operated by a partnership, corporation, or other type of organization. When a landowner has one or more tenants, renters, croppers, or managers, the land operated by each is considered a farm.

The sector distinguishes two basic activities: agricultural production and agricultural support activities. Agricultural production includes establishments performing the complete farm or ranch operation, such as farm owner-operators, tenant farm operators, and sharecroppers. Agricultural support activities include establishments that perform one or more activities associated with farm operation, such as soil preparation, planting, harvesting, and management, on a contract or fee basis.

Excluded from the Agriculture, Forestry, Hunting and Fishing sector are establishments primarily engaged in agricultural research and establishments primarily engaged in administering programs for regulating and conserving land, mineral, wildlife, and forest use. These establishments are classified in Industry 54171, Research and Development in the Physical, Engineering, and Life Sciences; and Industry 92412, Administration of Conservation Programs, respectively.

== Sector 11 Codes ==
The values for NAICS codes beginning with 11 are summarized below.

- 11 Agriculture, Forestry, Fishing and Hunting
  - 111 Crop Production
    - 1111 Oilseed and Grain Farming
    - 1112 Vegetable and Melon Farming
    - 1113 Fruit and Tree Nut Farming
    - 1114 Greenhouse, Nursery, and Floriculture Production
    - 1119 Other Crop Farming
  - 112 Animal Production
    - 1121 Cattle Ranching and Farming
    - 1122 Hog and Pig Farming
    - 1123 Poultry and Egg Production
    - 1124 Sheep and Goat Farming
    - 1125 Animal Aquaculture
    - 1129 Other Animal Production
  - 113 Forestry and Logging
    - 1131 Timber Tract Operations
    - 1132 Forest Nurseries and Gathering of Forest Products
    - 1133 Logging
  - 114 Fishing, Hunting and Trapping
    - 1141 Fishing
    - 1142 Hunting and Trapping
  - 115 Support Activities for Agriculture and Forestry
    - 1151 Support Activities for Crop Production
    - 1152 Support Activities for Animal Production
    - 1153 Support Activities for Forestry
