= Transportation in North America =

Transportation in North America is performed through a varied transportation system, whose quality ranges from being on par with a high-quality European motorway to an unpaved gravelled back road that can extend hundreds of miles. There is also an extensive transcontinental freight rail network, but passenger railway ridership is lower than in Europe and Asia.

== Railways ==
=== Canada, the United States and Mexico ===
The railroad network of North America (using standard gauge) is extremely extensive, connecting nearly every major and most minor cities. The United States, Canada, and Mexico have an interconnected system with railheads stretching from Hay River, Northwest Territories, Canada, to Tapachula, Mexico, and on Vancouver Island. The state government of Alaska also operates the Alaska Railroad, which does not connect to the North American network. In Canada, rail lines from Labrador City, Newfoundland and Labrador, to Sept-Îles, Quebec, also are not linked to the North American network.

==== Newfoundland and Labrador ====
There have been proposals to link the island of Newfoundland to the mainland of North America via a 17 km-long rail tunnel under the Strait of Belle Isle, which would also carry automobile traffic on flatcars, similar to the Channel Tunnel between the United Kingdom and France. This has stalled due to the lack of a large road network and a lack of rail lines in Labrador, and the remoteness of the area on both sides of the strait in Newfoundland and Labrador. Another issue to contend with is that Newfoundland had abandoned its Canadian National/Newfoundland Railway lines (3 ft 6 in (1,067 mm) gauge until 1988–1990), turning it into the Newfoundland T'Railway, a rail trail spanning the entire island. An automobile tunnel would be most likely unfeasible due to the length needed to cross the strait, and the difficulties of removing automobile exhaust and bringing in fresh air via large circulation fans throughout the tunnel.

==== Alaska ====
Alaska is not connected to the North American rail network except by train ferry. There have been proposals to connect it directly via BC Rail's incomplete but graded rail extension to Dease Lake, where the rails have been laid to Jackson, British Columbia. The only way for rail-based equipment to enter or leave Alaska is via rail ferry from Seattle, Washington. The only railway crossing the Alaska border is the White Pass and Yukon Route, a narrow-gauge heritage railway linking Whitehorse, Yukon, with Skagway, Alaska.

==== Railheads of the network ====
The current railheads or endpoints of the rail network are, in the north, at Hay River, Northwest Territories (the northernmost part of the North American rail network, operated by CN), Jackson, British Columbia (formerly BC Rail), Lynn Lake and Churchill, Manitoba (Hudson Bay Railway), Moosonee (Ontario Northland Railway), Chibougamau and Matagami, Quebec (also CN). In the west, the railheads are at Vancouver, British Columbia, Prince Rupert, British Columbia (CN), with ferry service to Vancouver Island for the railways linking Nanaimo, Esquimalt, and Victoria. In the east, the North American network extends to Halifax, and Sydney, Nova Scotia.

In the south, the rail lines terminate at Port of Chiapas, and Ciudad Hidalgo, with a short dual-gauge spur line to the border city of Ciudad Tecún Umán, Guatemala.

==== Proposed by Russia ====
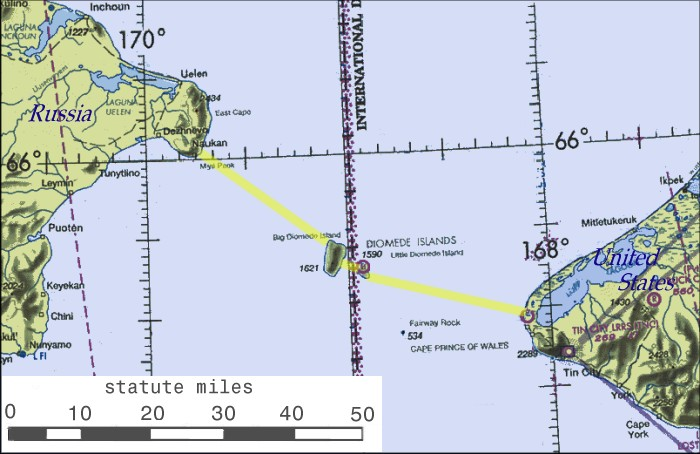
Possible route of a bridge or tunnel across the Bering Strait.

In April 2007 the Russian government announced that it was considering building a rail tunnel under the Bering Strait between Chukotka and Alaska. The tunnel, as projected, would be 60 miles (100 km) long and would include oil and gas pipelines, fiber optic cables and power lines. The tunnel project was estimated to cost $65 billion and take 15–20 years to build. In addition to the Russian government, sponsors of the project apparently include Transneft and RAO United Energy Systems.

=== Central America ===
Mexico has a connection to Central America, but it is a break of gauge, since Mexico uses 1,435 mm (4 ft 8 1/2 in) standard gauge, while Guatemala and Central America use narrow gauge 914 mm (3 ft). Aside from a short spur line linking border city of Ciudad Tecún Umán, Guatemala, the entire nation is on 914 mm (3 ft) gauge.

South of Guatemala, there are numerous breaks of gauge, such as 1,067 mm (3 ft 6 in) (with Honduras), and El Salvador (which uses the same 914 mm gauge of rail, but is currently closed, with some sections abandoned and unusable). Nicaragua has also closed its rail network in 1996, though the majority of it was 1,067 mm (3 ft 6 in) gauge, with some 1,435 mm (4 ft 8 1/2 in) lines along the Atlantic Coast. Costa Rica's railroads are of 1,067 mm (3 ft 6 in) gauge, along with a private 600 mm (1 ft 11 5/8 in) gauge railroad at 3.5 km in length. The railroads of Panama are connected to Costa Rica. The country had two gauges: originally broad gauge 1,524 mm (5 ft), which was converted to standard gauge (1,435 mm (4 ft 8 1/2 in)) in 2000, and narrow gauge (914 mm). Like the situation with roads, the Darién Gap is a formidable obstacle to railroads, and no railways cross it into South America.

== Roadways ==
The continent's roads are of varying quality, with divided highway standards in some areas but poor-quality gravel or unpaved roads in others. The road network extends from Prudhoe Bay, Alaska, and Anchorage, Alaska, in the extreme northwest, to Sydney, Nova Scotia, Cartwright, Newfoundland and Labrador, Blanc Sablon and Natashquan, Quebec, in the extreme east, all the way to Yaviza, Panama, in the extreme south. It does not connect with the South American road network due to the Darién Gap.

Some roads are seasonal, such as ice roads that cover frozen bodies of water, winter roads which cross otherwise impassable wetlands only in cold weather, and unpaved mountain roads that turn to mud in the spring. The road network does not reach all settlements, and some remote arctic and subarctic communities are only accessible by seasonal road, open land, sea, or air transport. Some North American islands are served only by ferries or private boat. Notable disconnected islands include the West Indies, Vancouver Island, Newfoundland (island), Martha's Vineyard, Nantucket, and the Canadian Arctic Archipelago. Some roads and some entire localities are intentionally car-free.

=== United States ===
The United States road network is the largest in the world, with 6.4 million km (4 million mi) of roadways. 75,360 km (46,830 mi) of those are Interstate Highways, and around another 200,000 km (120,000 mi) are U.S. Highways. The Interstate Highway system is almost completely composed of multi-lane, dual-carriageway freeways. The contiguous United States are also connected to its exclave, Alaska, via the Alaska Highway, which links the state to Yukon Territory, British Columbia, and the Lower 48 states. The continental United States is disconnected from the state of Hawaii and various insular areas in the Caribbean and Oceania.

Many settlements in Alaska are disconnected from the continental road network except by ferry or boat, including the capital Juneau, Sitka, Kodiak, Bethel, Nome, and Utqiaġvik. The Dalton Highway connects the mainland via Fairbanks with the otherwise remote Prudhoe Bay, Alaska on the North Slope as a service road for the Trans-Alaska Pipeline.

=== Canada ===
The Trans Canada Highway spans the country along with its auxiliary branches. The Yellowhead Highway branches to the north, and the Crowsnest Highway, acts as a southern spur or shortcut to traveling from Alberta to British Columbia across the Rocky Mountains. Canada's national highways are similar to the US Route network, as it is mostly two-lane without freeway sections, aside from in and near large population centres, such as Montreal, Calgary, and Edmonton. Canada and the United States have also built the vital Alaska Highway, linking Anchorage, Alaska (and the rest of the state) to Canada and the rest of the United States.

Although Canada does not have a federal-level network of expressways, provinces from Ontario to Nova Scotia are inter-linked by provincial-level freeways: Ontario's 400-series highways network, Quebec's Autoroute network, New Brunswick's upgrades to its portions of the Trans-Canada Highway, and Nova Scotia's 100-series highways. These expressways are the provincial equivalents to the United States' Interstate Highway system.

One can travel between Windsor, Ontario, and Halifax, Nova Scotia, along continuous expressways within Canada, extending a distance of over 2,200 km. The final portion along Route 185/Autoroute 85 was twinned and upgraded to become a fully divided expressway in October 2026.

Ontario is the only province to contain its own system of county roads, which are controlled and maintained by the counties, districts, and regions of Ontario.

Provinces from Manitoba west have their own networks of highways (the majority of which are not expressways or divided highways), with Winnipeg also having its own Winnipeg City Routes. Alberta has its own small but growing inter-connected network of divided highways and freeways, such as Alberta Highway 1, Highway 2, and Highway 16. British Columbia also has a small network of freeways linking Vancouver to Kamloops, via Highway 1, and Highway 5, formerly a toll road.

==== Newfoundland and Labrador ====
In 2004 the provincial government studied the feasibility of a Newfoundland-Labrador fixed link joining the island of Newfoundland to the mainland of North America via a 17 km-long rail tunnel under the Strait of Belle Isle, which would also carry automobile traffic on flat cars, similar to the Channel Tunnel between the United Kingdom and France. This stalled due to the lack of a large road network and a lack of rail lines in Labrador, and the remoteness of the area on both sides of the strait in Newfoundland and Labrador. Another issue to contend with is that Newfoundland had abandoned its segments of its CN/Newfoundland Railway lines (3 ft 6 in or 1,070 mm narrow-gauge) in 1988–1990, turning it into the Newfoundland T'Railway, a rail trail spanning the entire island. An automobile tunnel would be most likely unfeasible due to the length needed to cross the strait, and the difficulties of removing automobile exhaust and bringing in fresh air via large circulation fans throughout the tunnel. Labrador is, however, connected to the continental road network via the Trans-Labrador Highway.

=== Mexico ===
Mexico also has a very large road network, 323,977 km worth of roads. Of these, 96,221 km are paved (this is including 6,335 km of expressways) The remainder (227,756 km worth) is unpaved. Since 1991, Mexico has been building toll roads that link its major cities together. Currently, there are 6,335 km worth of toll freeways in the country, with the numbering scheme of n-D (n being the number of the road bypassed, such as 45, with toll freeway as 45-D, meaning 45 Diversion).

=== Central America ===
Central America's roadway network continues, linking every major city and capital, via the Pan-American Highway, which continues through Panama, across the Panama Canal, to Yaviza, Panama. It is separated from South America by the large Darién Gap.

== Waterways ==
Waterways were the primary method of transportation of people and goods, and used by native aboriginal people in dugout canoes and kayaks.

The waterways remained important since Christopher Columbus arrived in 1492, right up until the First World War. Though their use has diminished somewhat with the arrival of rail transportation, the Interstate Highway/400 series highways networks of America and Canada, and with the debut of air travel, they are still widely used for transporting goods from the American Midwest to overseas markets.

The cities of Duluth, Minnesota, and Thunder Bay, Ontario (to some extent, Chicago, Illinois as well) are the most inland seaports/deepwater ports in the world, being well over 2000 miles from the shores of the Atlantic Ocean, yet they still can cater to cargo ships, thanks to the St. Lawrence Seaway, Welland Canal and Soo Locks, a joint-venture binational system of dams, locks, and canals built by Canada and the United States in 1959. The Mississippi/Missouri River system also sees a large amount of oceanbound ship traffic from cities such as St. Louis, Kansas City, and New Orleans.

Churchill, Manitoba, also serves as a minor port for grain and wheat loaded via railroad cars, and loaded onto ships bound for Europe at the intermodal facilities in that town.

The nation of Panama currently operates one of the world's busiest and most familiar waterways, the Panama Canal. This canal cuts through the Isthmus of Panama, connecting the Atlantic and Pacific Oceans, shaving off more than 9,000 miles (14,000 km) for ships, instead of having them travel around the tip of Cape Horn in South America. A ship travelling from New York City to San Francisco would be roughly 9,500 km (5,900 mi) in distance, while a trip around Cape Horn would be 22,500 km (14,000 mi) in length. The Canal functions similarly to the Suez Canal in Egypt.

=== Ferry services ===
Currently, car ferry and rail ferry service between New York City, New York/New Orleans, Louisiana/Miami, Florida, United States, and Havana, Cuba, is suspended, due to the ongoing embargo by the United States against Cuba. There is however, rail ferry service between Whittier, Alaska, and Prince Rupert, British Columbia (the AquaTrain, operated by the Alaska Railroad) and Washington state (Seattle), and a ferry to and from Mobile, Alabama, and the Port of Ponce Railroad in Ponce, Puerto Rico. Regular ferry service also links Vancouver Island and isolated Sunshine Coast communities to the mainland and to Alaska. There is also automobile ferry service between Nova Scotia and Newfoundland and Labrador, from Quebec to Labrador, and between Labrador and the island of Newfoundland.

== Air travel ==
Air travel first entered as a viable alternative to transcontinental railroads, and to the then-primitive (or non-existent) road networks that crossed the United States and Canada in the early 1930s, but truly increased in popularity after the Second World War.

Most of the continent's busiest airports are in the United States. In fact the U.S. has 9 of North America's 10 busiest airports, including the world's busiest, Hartsfield–Jackson Atlanta International Airport in Atlanta. The busiest airport in North America outside the United States is Toronto Pearson International Airport, in Toronto, Canada.

== See also ==
- Geography of North America
- List of sovereign states
- Transport
- North American Transportation Statistics Interchange
- World economy#Transport
- List of countries by rail transport network size
- Transport in Europe
- Bering Strait crossing
