= Glenreagh Mountain Railway =

Railway line in New South Wales, Australia

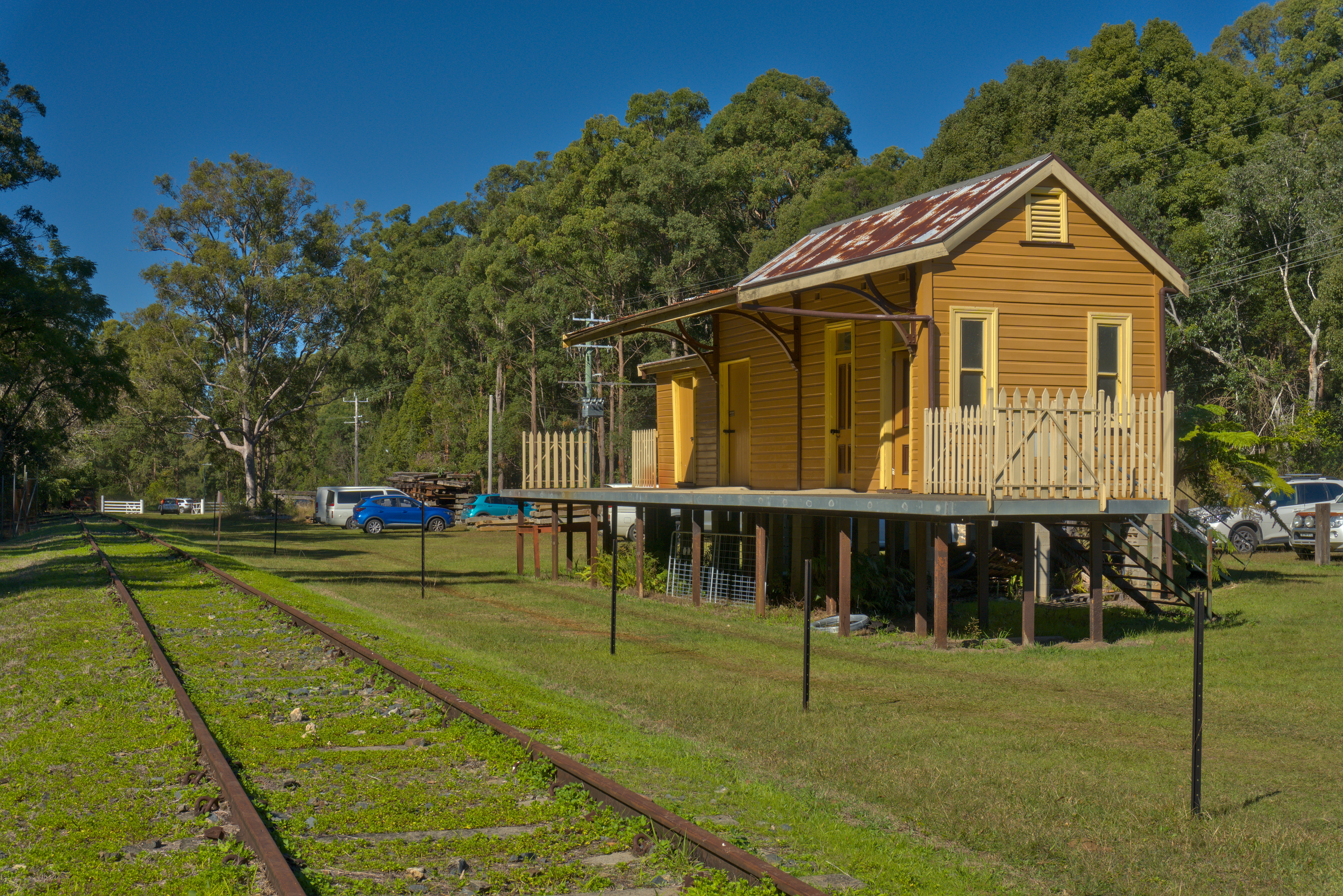
- Glenreagh Heritage Railway in 2026.
- Coordinates: 30°03′09″S 152°58′18″E

Commercial operations
- Original gauge: 4 ft 8 1/2 in (1,435 mm) standard gauge

Preserved operations
- Preserved gauge: 1,435 mm (4 ft 8 1/2 in) standard gauge

Website
- Glenreagh Mountain Railway website

Glenreagh Mountain Railway, known as the GMR, was established in 1989 as a heritage tourist railway at Glenreagh, near Coffs Harbour, New South Wales, Australia. GMR's objective is to restore and operate a heritage tourist railway on the Glenreagh to Ulong section of the Glenreagh to Dorrigo railway line.

GMR is a non-profit, community-based organisation run entirely by volunteers, and has an authority to raise funds under the Charitable Collections Act.

The GMR acquired the 35-kilometre (22 mi) section from Glenreagh to Ulong in 1999 from the State Rail Authority for $1 and began restoring this section of line as well as rolling stock, to enable the heritage tourist railway to operate.

Tourist trains for the public were operated in 2004.

GMR's current rolling stock includes steam locomotive Z19 class 1919, 4-wheel watergin L568, TAM sleeping car, two heritage end-platform cars, S type carriages, ex-U set interurban carriages, and numerous trikes and track maintenance vehicles.

As of December 2005, GMR had completed trackwork to safe working standards for train operation from Glenreagh West Depot 3.5 km (2.2 mi) west to Tallawudjah Creek. Steam train operations were scheduled one weekend a month subject to fire bans.

In February 2008 operations ceased while GMR worked to fulfill its obligations under the Rail Safety Act.

== Rolling stock ==
- Z19 class locomotive: 1919
- CPH railmotor: 11
- Sydney R1 class tram: 1936
- Melbourne W class trams: 392, 447

== See also ==
- Dorrigo Steam Railway & Museum (further along the same former branch line)
