= New South Wales Z20 class locomotive =

Australian 2-6–4T locomotives

New South Wales Z20 class
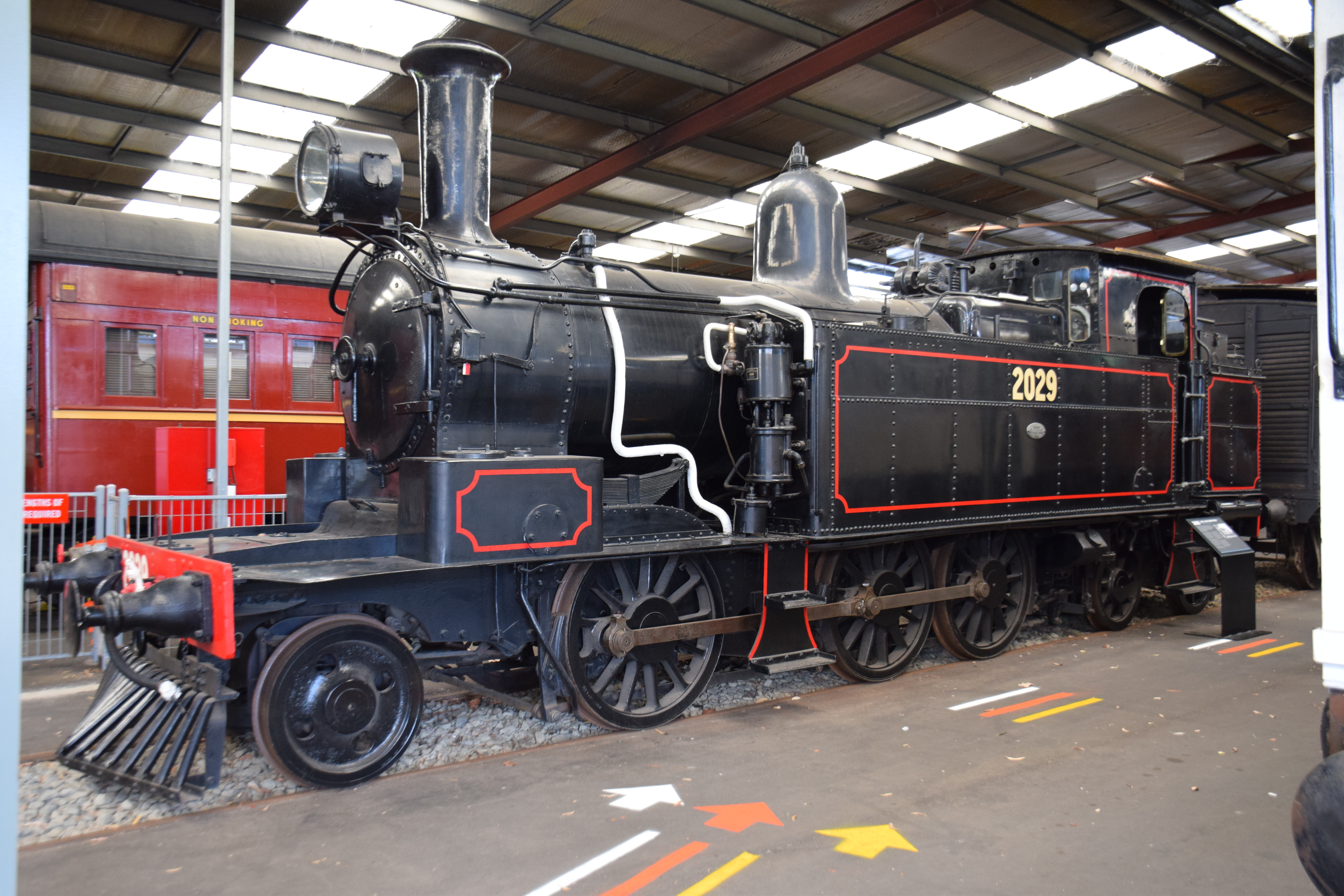
- 2029 at the NSW Rail Museum, Thirlmere
Type and origin
- Power type: Steam
- Builder: Beyer, Peacock & Company (12, new)
- Serial number: BP 3202–3207, 3289–3294 (new)
- Build date: 1890–1891 (new)
- Total produced: 19 new, 14 rebuilt from Z19 class
Specifications
- Configuration
  - Whyte: 2-6-4T
- Gauge: 1,435 mm (4 ft 8 1/2 in) standard gauge
- Driver dia.: 4 ft 0 in (1,219 mm)
- Adhesive weight: E(10): 77,000 lb (34,927 kg); A/E: 84,000 lb (38,102 kg)
- Loco weight: E(10): 126,000 lb (57,153 kg); A/E: 137,000 lb (62,142 kg)
- Fuel type: Coal
- Firebox
  - Grate area: 18 sq ft (1.7 m^{2})
- Boiler pressure: 150 psi (1.03 MPa)
- Heating surface: E(10): 1,380 sq ft (128 m^{2}); A/E: 1,320 sq ft (123 m^{2})
- Superheater: None
- Cylinders: 2
- Cylinder size: 18 in × 24 in (457 mm × 610 mm)
Performance figures
- Tractive effort: 20,655 lbf (91.9 kN)
Career
- Operators: New South Wales Government Railways
- Class: New: E(10), rebuilds: A/E; both later Z20
- Preserved: 2029
- Disposition: 1 preserved, 32 scrapped

The New South Wales Z20 class is a class of 2-6-4T steam locomotives operated by the New South Wales Government Railways of Australia.

== History ==
There was a total of 33 members of this class of 2-6-4T mixed traffic side tank locomotives. There were three differing types.

Twelve were classified E(10) class under the pre-1924 recording. These locomotives were built by Beyer, Peacock & Company and delivered in 1891 for use on Newcastle coal traffic. They proved very successful in suburban goods and coal traffic, picnic trains to Toronto, but were unsuited to main line passenger traffic. When displaced by more powerful locomotives, many were used as shunters. Their final services were on short light branch lines, such as Kurrajong, Carlingford, Camden, Rogans Hill and Morpeth. A number were also to be found shunting the industrial sidings at Port Kembla.

In 1902, there was a shortage of tank locomotives. Six members of the A(93) class 0-6-0 tender engines were converted to a new A/E class tank locomotives by Eveleigh Railway Workshops. A further eight conversions were made in 1909/10. In 1911, seven new locomotives were constructed at Eveleigh. As part of the 1924 reclassification scheme, these 21 locomotives were grouped with the twelve E(10) class to form the (Z)20-class.

== Later years ==
As more tender locomotives became available for suburban goods traffic, the surplus locomotives of the combined class were scrapped or sold. Some of the locomotives which were sold to industrial interests include:

- 2002 to the Public Works Department as PWD80
- 2003, 2004 and 2012 to Australian Iron & Steel, Port Kembla as Wonga, Wallaroo & Wombat
- 2008 to the Electrolytic Refining & Smelting Company, Port Kembla
- 2013 to Widemere Quarry, Fairfield resold to J & A Brown Abermain Seaham Collieries, Hexham
- 2017 and 2020 to Hebburn Collieries, Weston
- 2014 to Bunnerong Power Station
- 2018 to Southern Portland Cement
- 2031 to Bulli Colliery

== Preservation ==
The last member of the class in service with the New South Wales Government Railways was 2029 which had been retained for working the Holsworthy railway line. It has been preserved by the NSW Rail Museum, Thirlmere and cosmetically restored.
