= Sydney steam tram motor =

Australian transit vehicle

NSWGT Steam Motor Trams (Sydney)
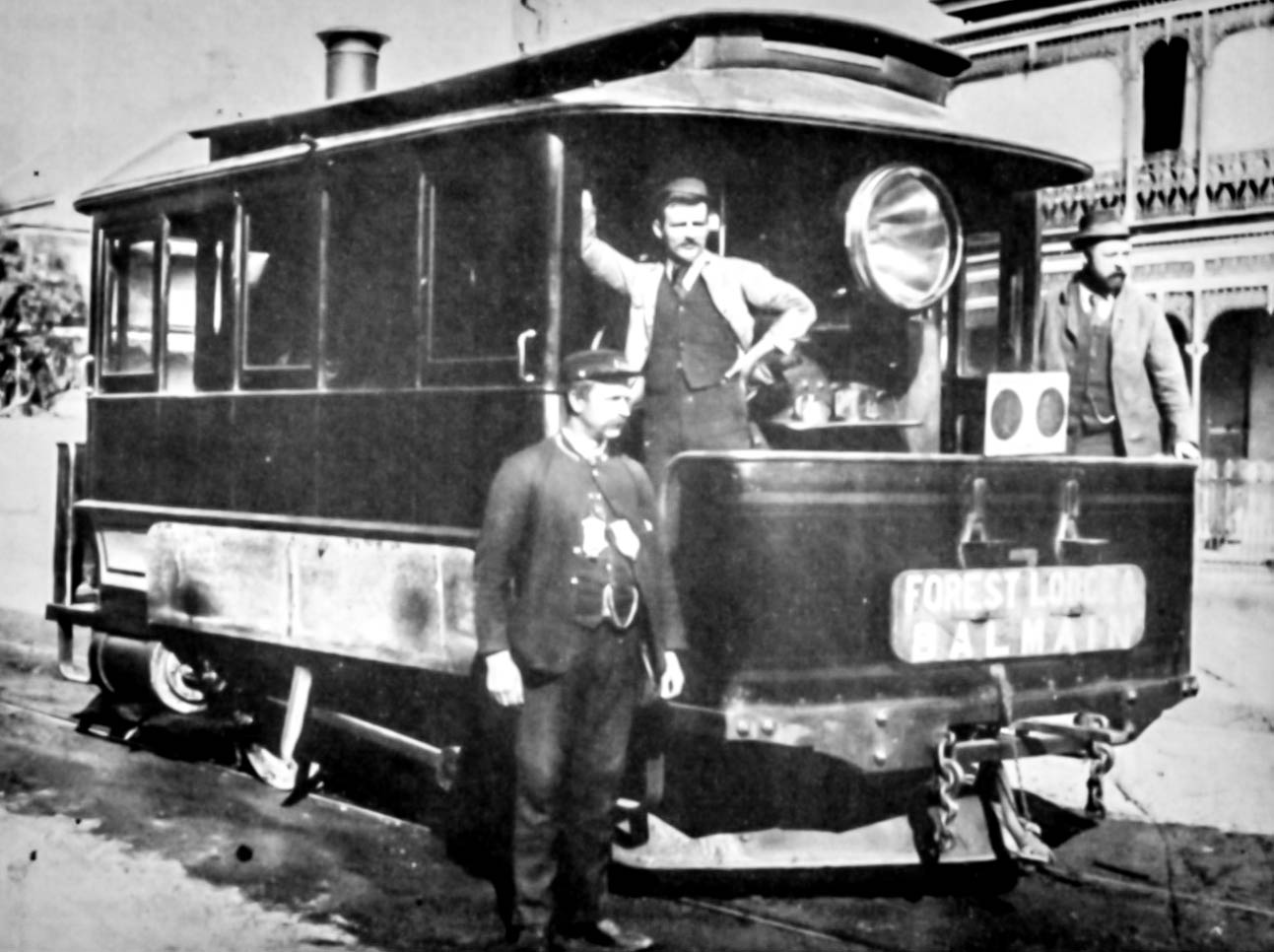
- Baldwin Tram Motor No. 7 at Balmain, New South Wales
- Manufacturers: Baldwin Locomotive Works; Randwick Tramway Workshops; Henry Vale; T. Wearne
- Designer: Baldwin Locomotive Works
- Constructed: 1879-1923
- Number built: 123

Specifications
- Train length: 17 feet 2 inches (5.23 m)
- Width: 8 feet 6 inches (2.59 m)
- Maximum speed: 20 km/h (12 mph)
- Weight: 14 long tons 2 cwt (31,600 lb or 14.3 t)
- Track gauge: 1,435 mm (4 ft 8 1/2 in)

The Sydney Steam Motor Trams were built for and operated by the New South Wales Government Tramways of Australia.

== History ==
Steam trams were introduced when four steam tram motors imported to Sydney as a temporary transport for the International Exhibition of 1879. It was built at the Baldwin Locomotive Works, Philadelphia, United States and hauled double decker trailers conveying passengers from the Redfern railway terminus to near the Botanic Gardens.

A Beyer, Peacock & Company steam tram of 1885 was sent to Australia in 1886 as a trial unit by the New South Wales Government Tramways (NSWGT) for comparison against the Baldwin steam tram. The Baldwin design prevailed and this engine returned to England in 1889 to become Beyer Peacock works shunter No. 2. The engine was rumoured to have fallen into the sea on its return voyage, but it survived and is still in working order and known as 'John Bull'. Some sources show it as numbered '47' in Sydney, but number 47 had already been allocated around 1883.

== Design ==
The steam tram motor is essentially a small 0-4-0 saddle tank locomotive with a wooden cab enclosing the frame, with five windows along each side. Access to the cab is through doors from either the front or back platform. The tram is powered by an orthodox locomotive type boiler, American bar type framing, conventional "D" type slide valves and spring suspension. Coke and later coal was carried in a bunker on the rear platform and water in the semi-circular saddle tank.

Typical specifications for an 11" Baldwin steam tram motor:

- Cylinders: 11 in × 16 in (280 mm × 410 mm) (bore × stroke)
- Boiler pressure: 120 psi (830 kPa)
- Tractive effort: 5,500 lbf (24 kN) at 10 mph (16 km/h)
- Weight: 14 long tons 2 cwt (31,600 lb or 14.3 t)
- Length: 17 ft 2 in (5.23 m)
- Width: 8 ft 6 in (2.59 m)

== Service ==
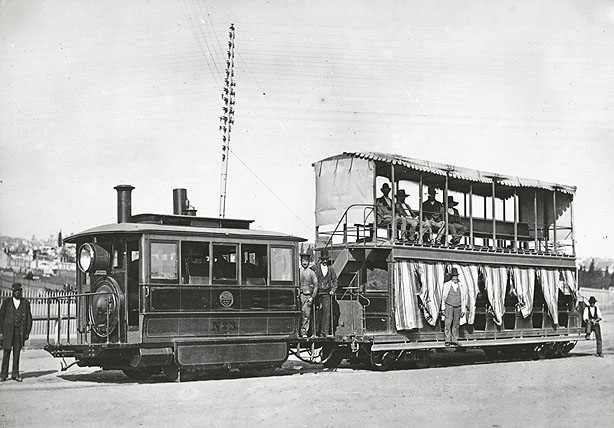
Sydney Steam motor and trailer car, 1879

The Redfern to Botanic Gardens tramway was planned to operate for the duration of the exhibition. It was so popular that an extension to Randwick was opened in 1880. The peak of steam working was reached in 1894, when the tramway's length reached 40 mi (64 km) with over 100 steam trams in service. In 1905-6 steam routes were electrified, with the tram motors gradually relegated to outer suburbs.

Government tram lines in Sydney that were not electrified were the Kogarah to San Souci line, the Arncliffe to Bexley line, the Sutherland to Cronulla line, and the line from Parramatta to Castle Hill. There was also a privately operated line from Parramatta Park to Redbank Wharf, which only operated using steam tram motors.

Steam trams also operated on regional New South Wales tramways at Newcastle, Maitland, and Broken Hill. Steam tram motors, with railway contour wheels, were used on the East Maitland–Morpeth railway line, between 1895 and 1915.

The Steam Tram Motors in service were:

Steam Tram Motors
Builder	Date	Cyl Diam.	Original Nos.	Total
Baldwin	1879	11 inch	1-4	4
Baldwin	1880	11 inch	5-10	6
Baldwin	1881	10 inch	11, 13, 15-18, 26	7
Baldwin	1881	11 inch	12, 14, 19-25	9
Baldwin	1881	9 inch	27-30	4
Baldwin	1882	9 inch	31-33	3
Baldwin	1882	11 inch	34-41 (*)	8
Baldwin	1882	10 inch	44, 45	2
Baldwin	1883	10 inch	46, 47-49, 51-54, 56, 57 (**)	10
Baldwin	1884	11 inch	58-69 (***)	12
Baldwin	1885	11 inch	77-96	20
Baldwin	1891	11 inch	76 (2nd), 97, 98-110	15
Henry Vale	1890	11 inch	50 (2nd), 70 (2nd), 75	7
Henry Vale	1891	11 inch	5 (2nd), 12 (2nd), 13 (2nd), 27 (2nd), 28 (2nd), 76 (2nd)	6
T. Wearne	1884	10 inch	76	1
T. Wearne	1886	10 inch	97 (2nd)	1
Randwick Workshops	1916	11 inch	126A-128A	3
Randwick Workshops	1917	11 inch	129A, 130A	2
Randwick Workshops	1923	11 inch	131A, 132A	2
Randwick Workshops	1957		body only built for processions	1

(*) Numbers 42 and 43 were two Kitson steam motors, ordered in 1881, that were unreliable in service.

(**) Number 55 was an experimental steam motor, made by Merryweather & Sons, that arrived in 1881.

(***) Numbers 70 to 75 were six 'Baldwin-Downe' steam motors, delivered 1883-1884, that were first bogies of combined motor-passenger cars known as 'Jumbos'.

== Demise and preservation ==
The last NSWGT steam motor was withdrawn from service in 1937, and replaced by a trolley bus service. The private line at Parramatta closed in 1943.

Preserved trams are:

- Steam Tram Motor No. 1A, owned by Powerhouse Museum The number '1A' was applied by the Powerhouse Museum. It is actually Steam Motor 28a of Henry Vale & Co. Makers number 52.
- Steam Tram Motor No. 103a, at Valley Heights Steam Tramway Built by Baldwin Locomotive Works in Philadelphia, Pennsylvania in 1891. Makers number 11676.
- Steam Tram Motor No. 100, at Museum of Transport and Technology, Auckland. Built by Baldwin Locomotive Works in Philadelphia, Pennsylvania in 1891. Makers number 11885.

The Beyer Peacock steam motor, known as "John Bull", survives at the National Tramway Museum.

== Gallery ==
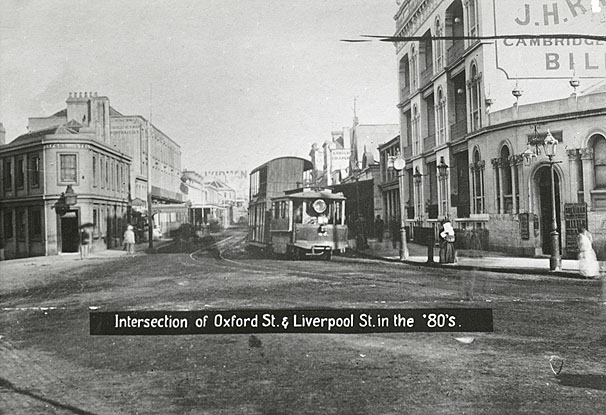
Early Sydney tram

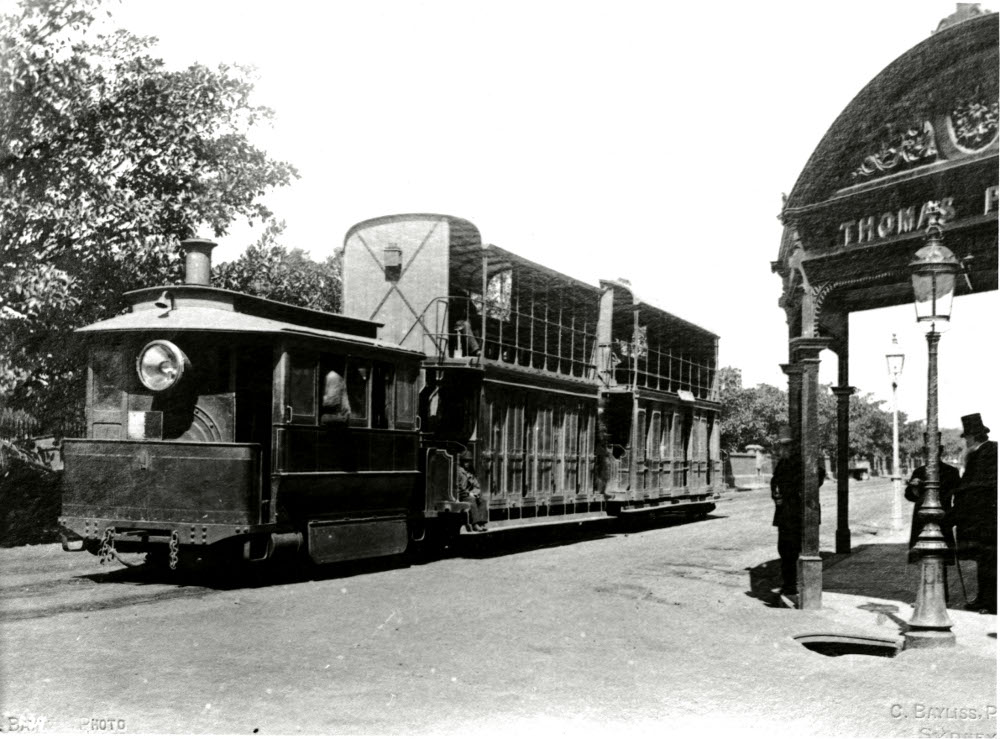
Sydney tram with two trailer, c. 1885

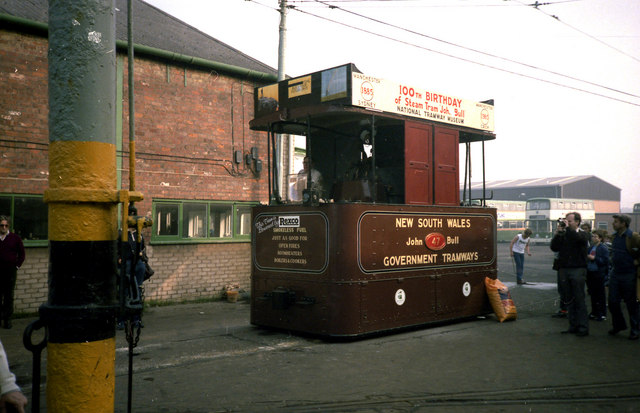
'John Bull'

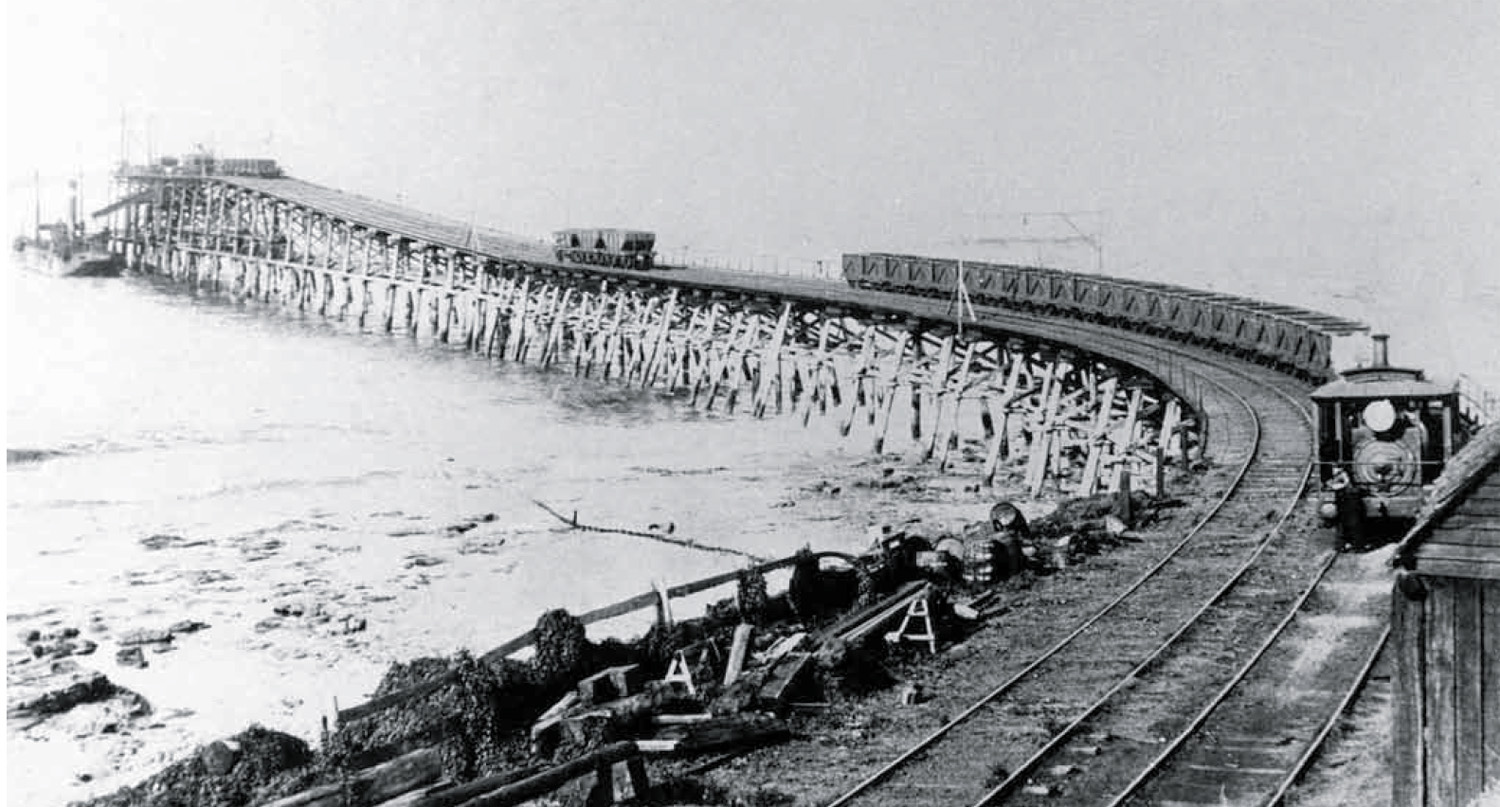
Steam tram motor hauling coal wagons across Bulli Jetty c. 1900

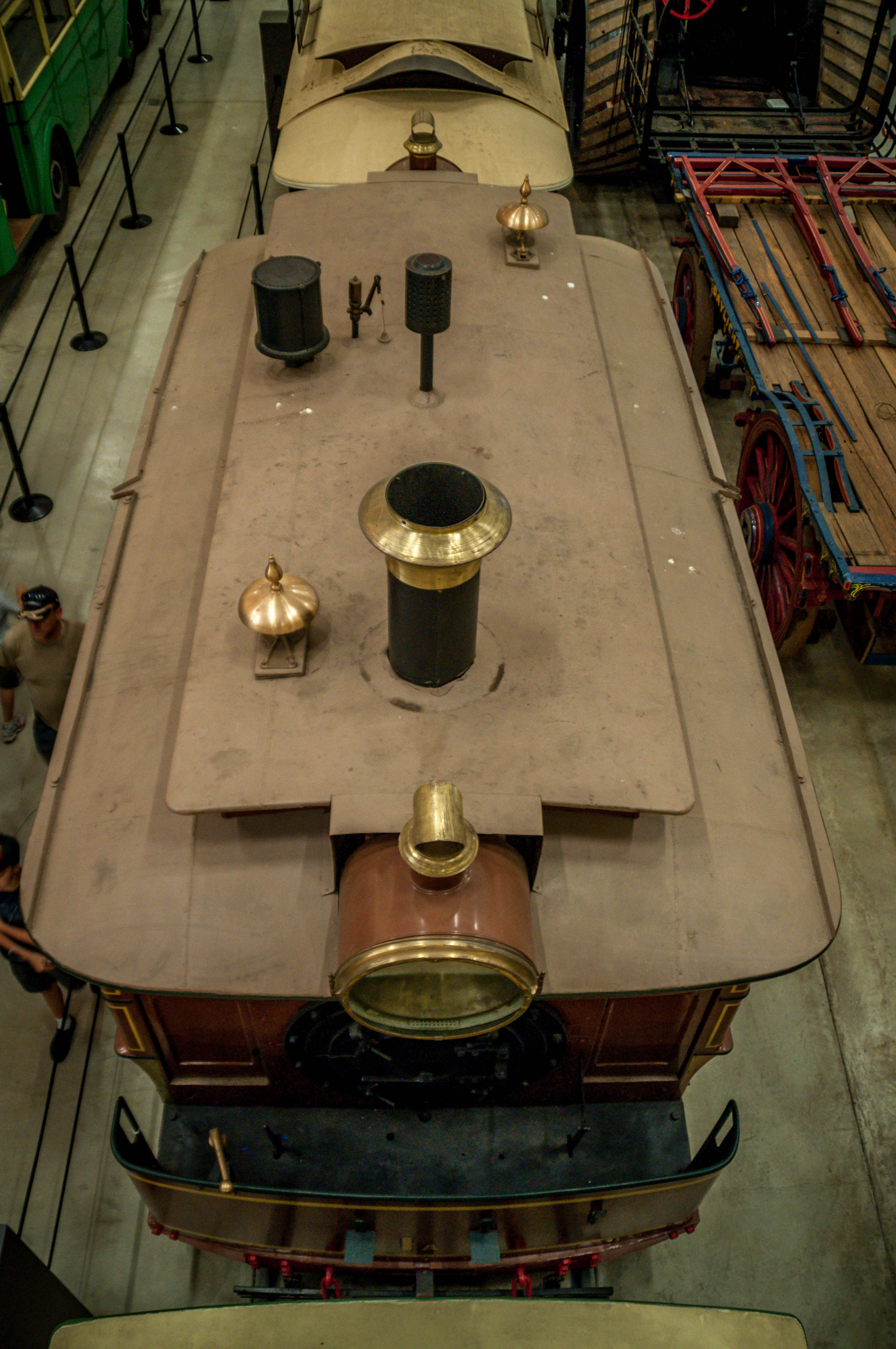
No. 1A Top View

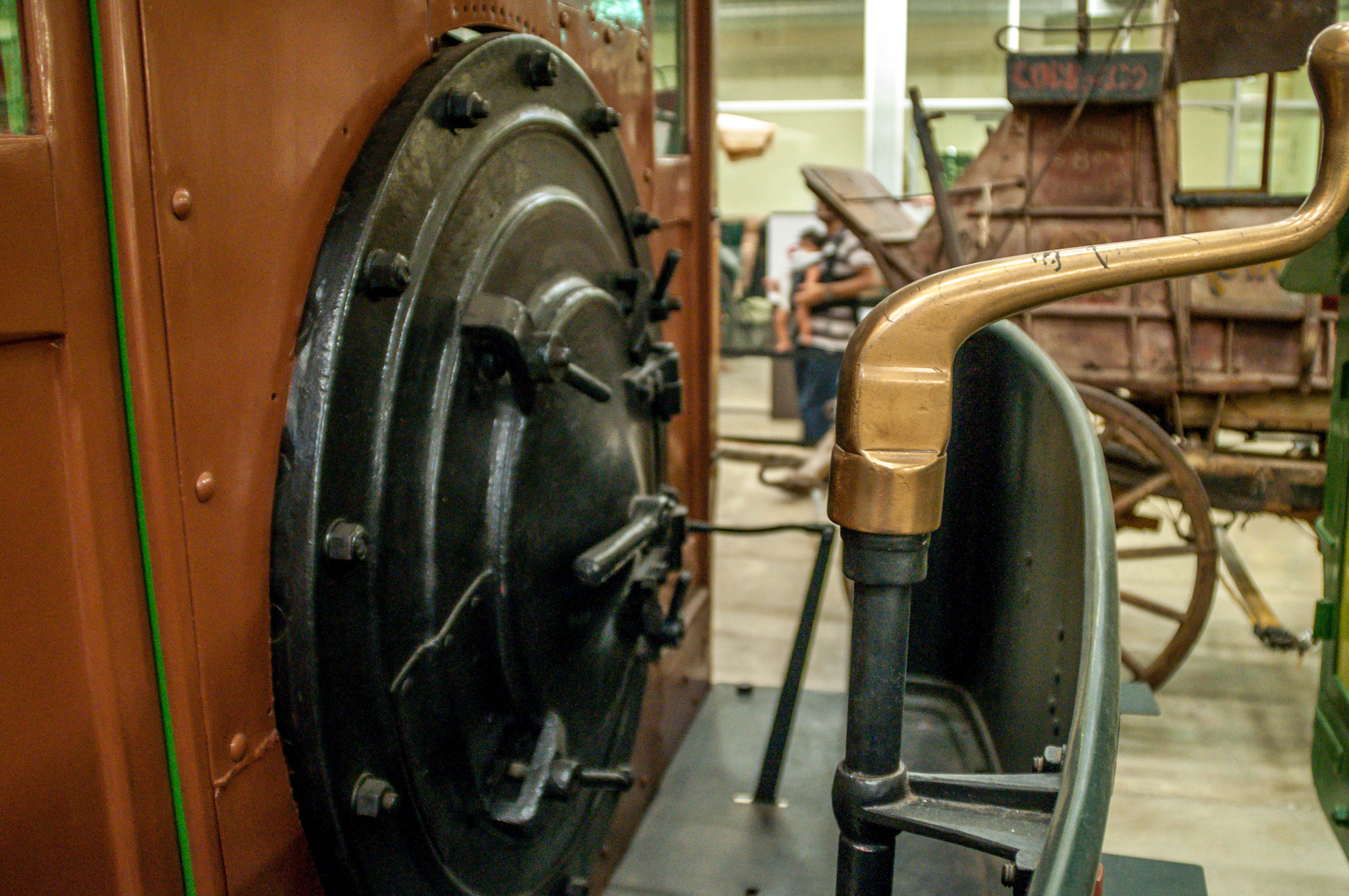
Tram Motor No. 1A

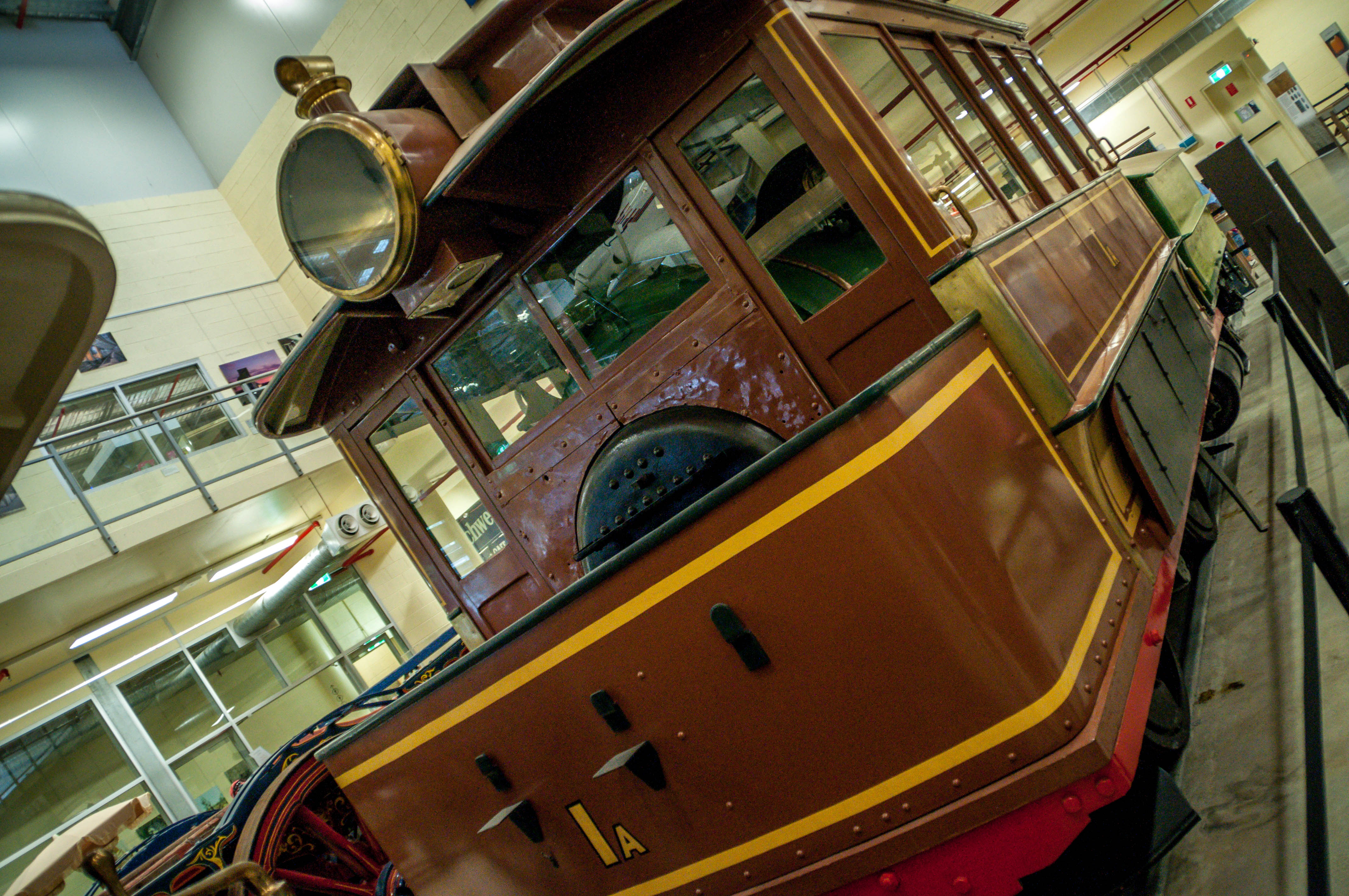
Tram Motor No. 1A

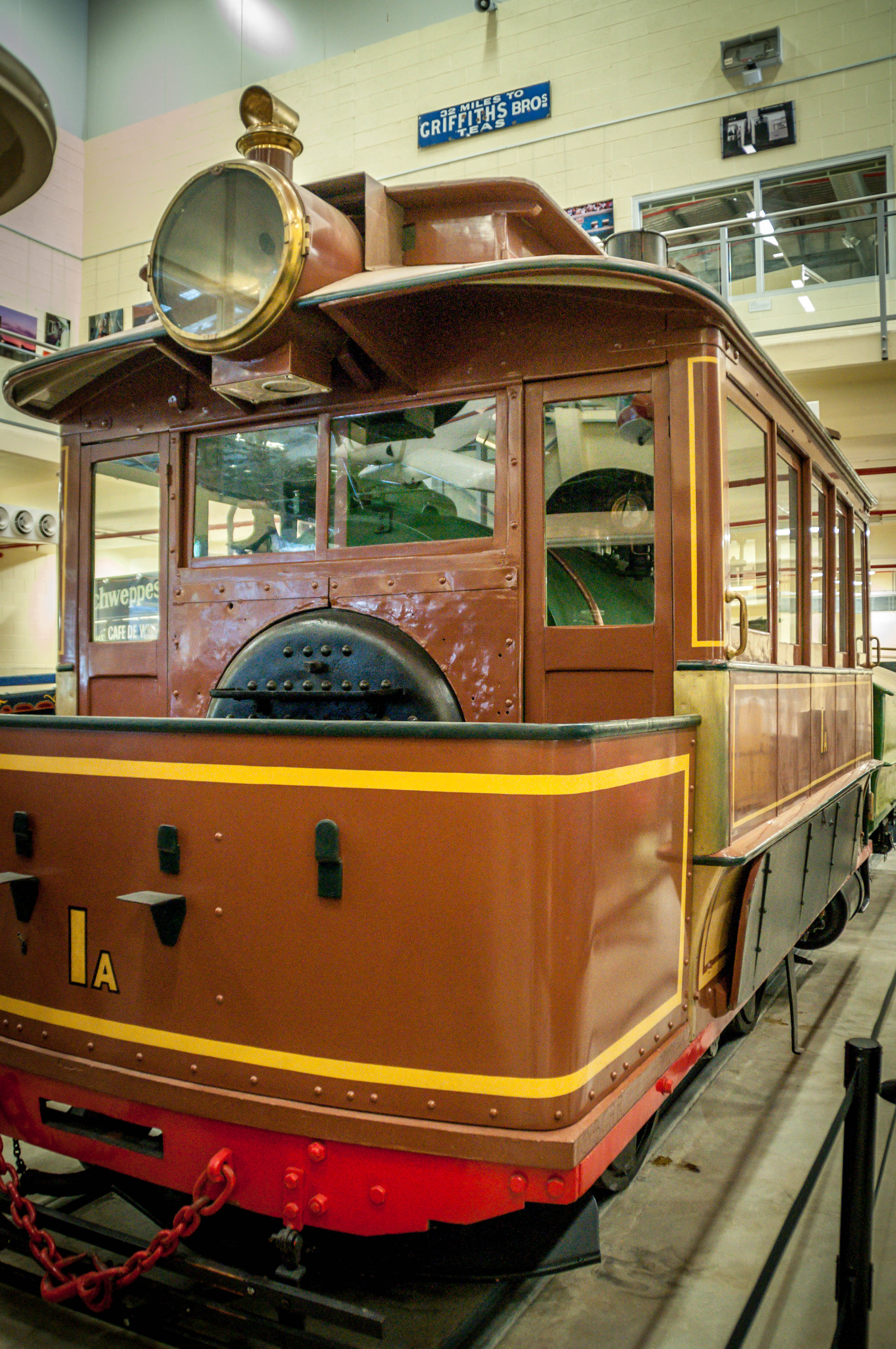
No. 1A Side View

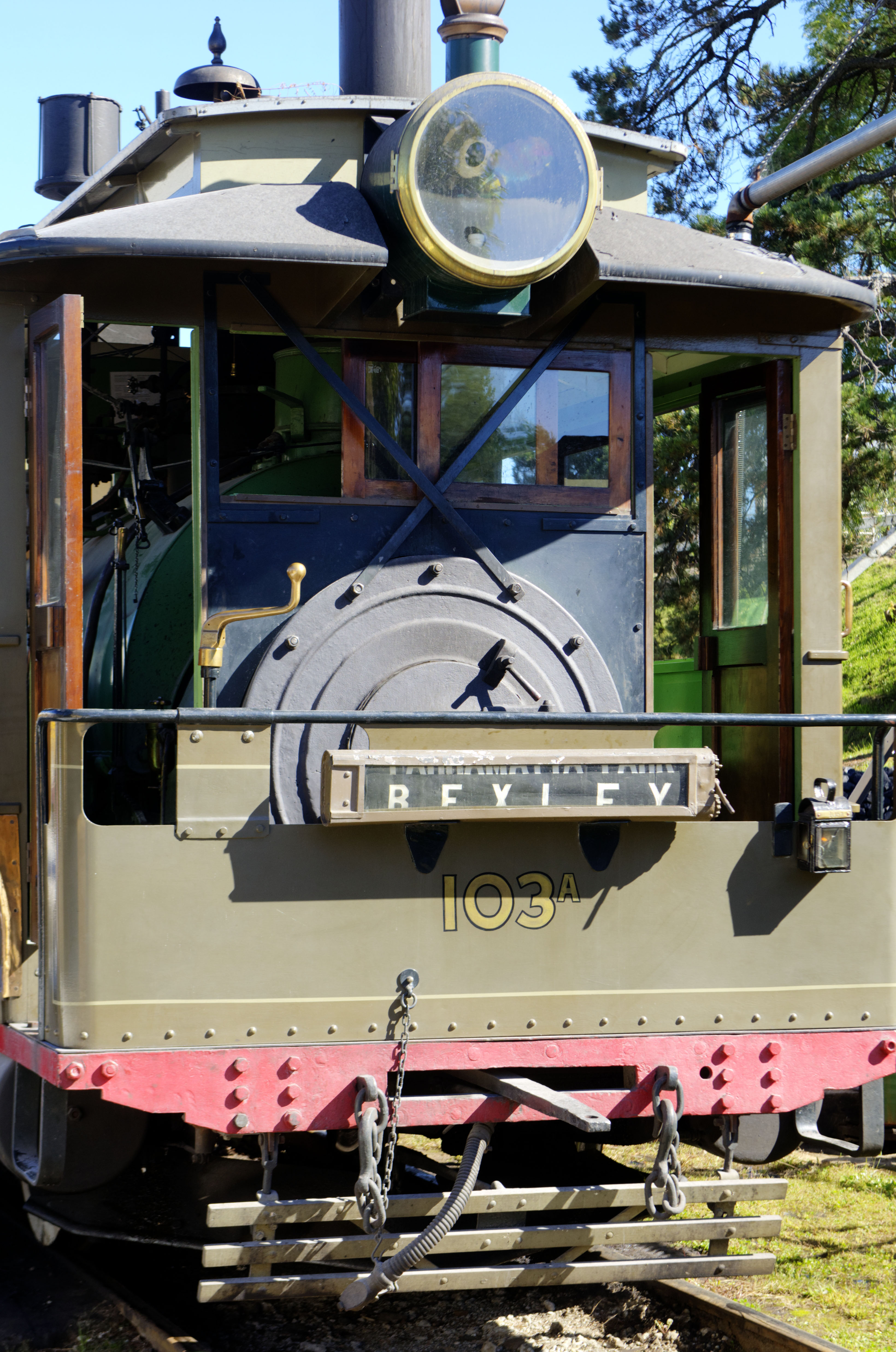
Tram Motor 103A

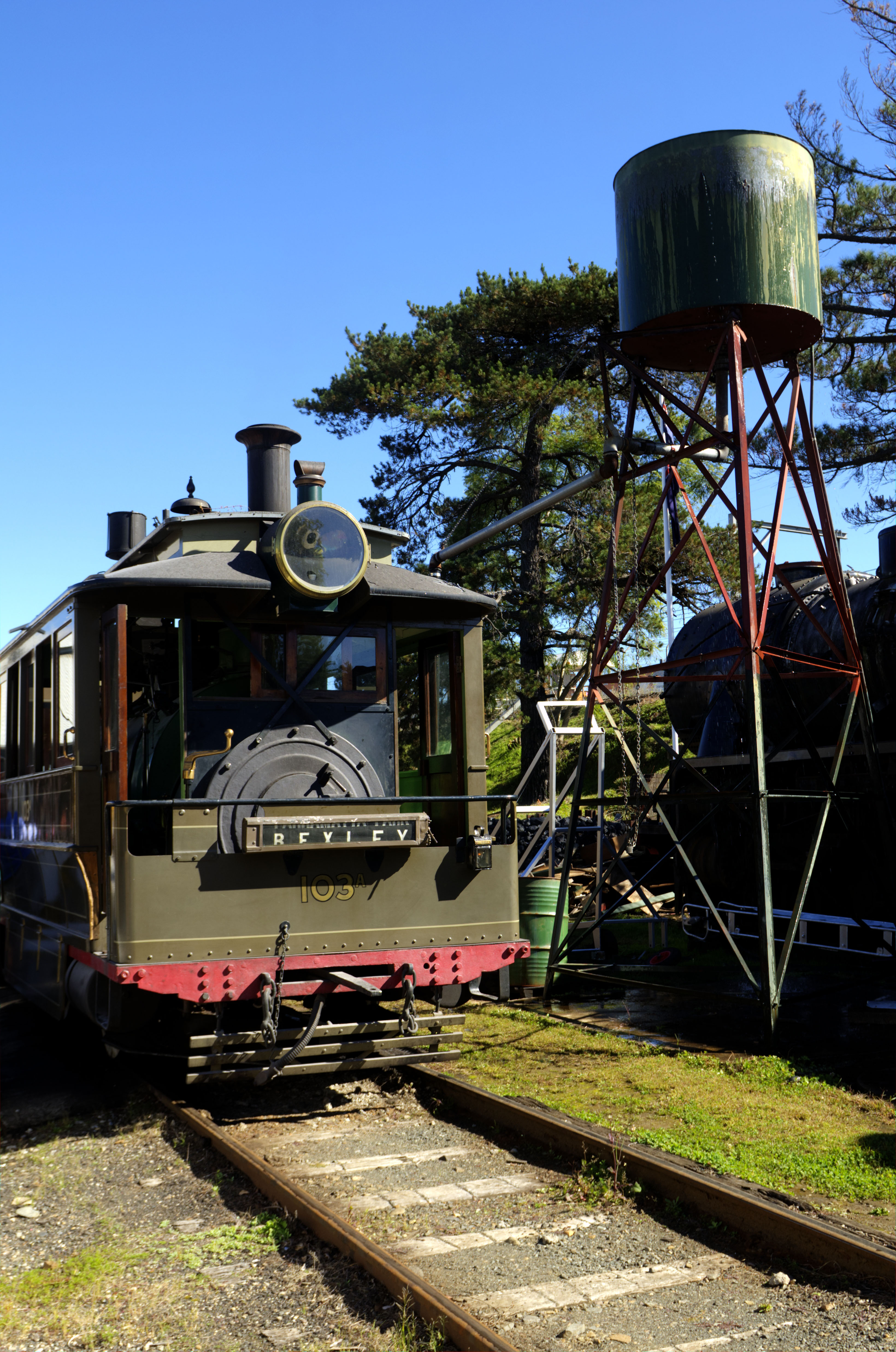
Tram Motor 103A

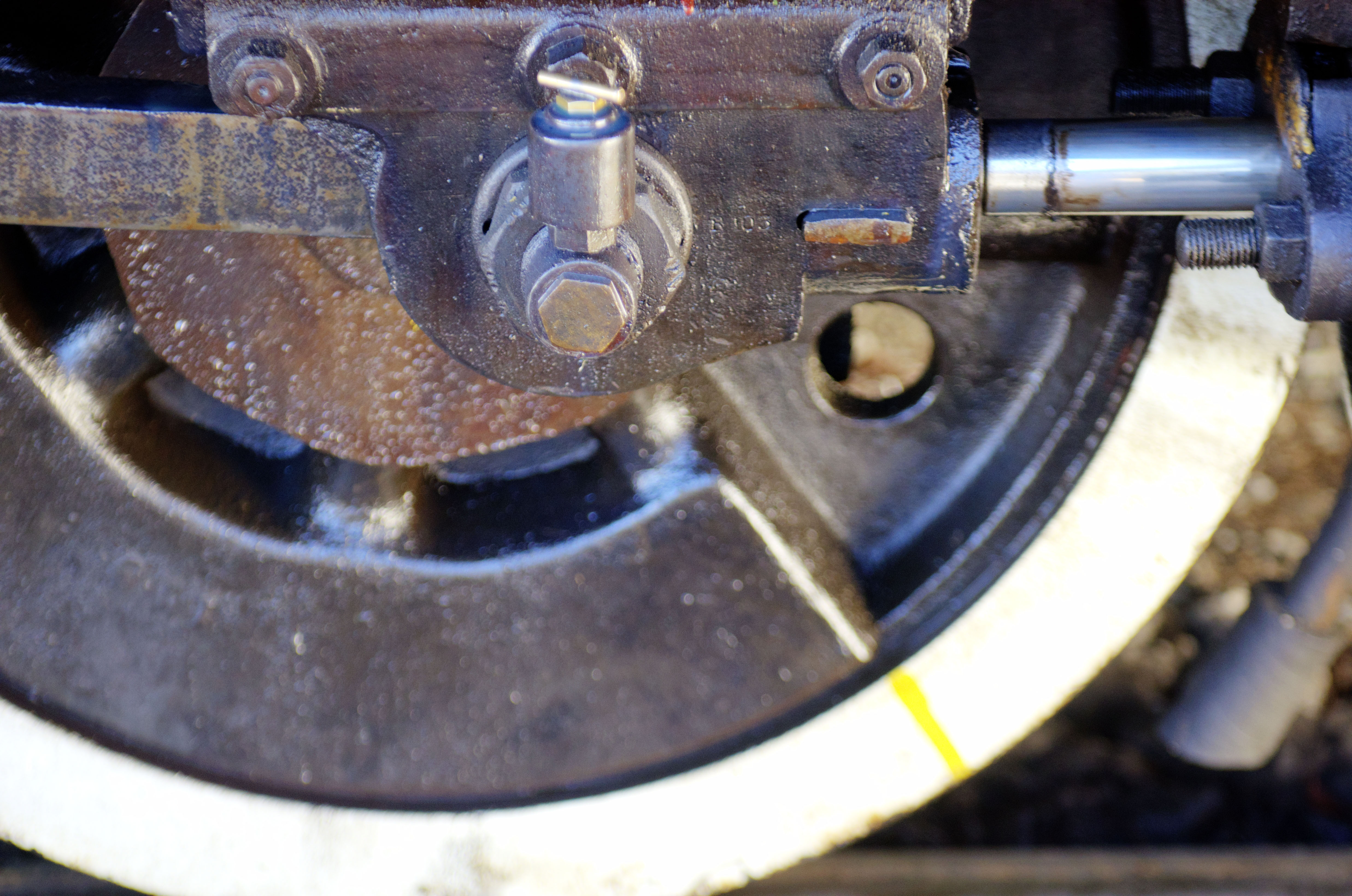
103A Driving Wheel

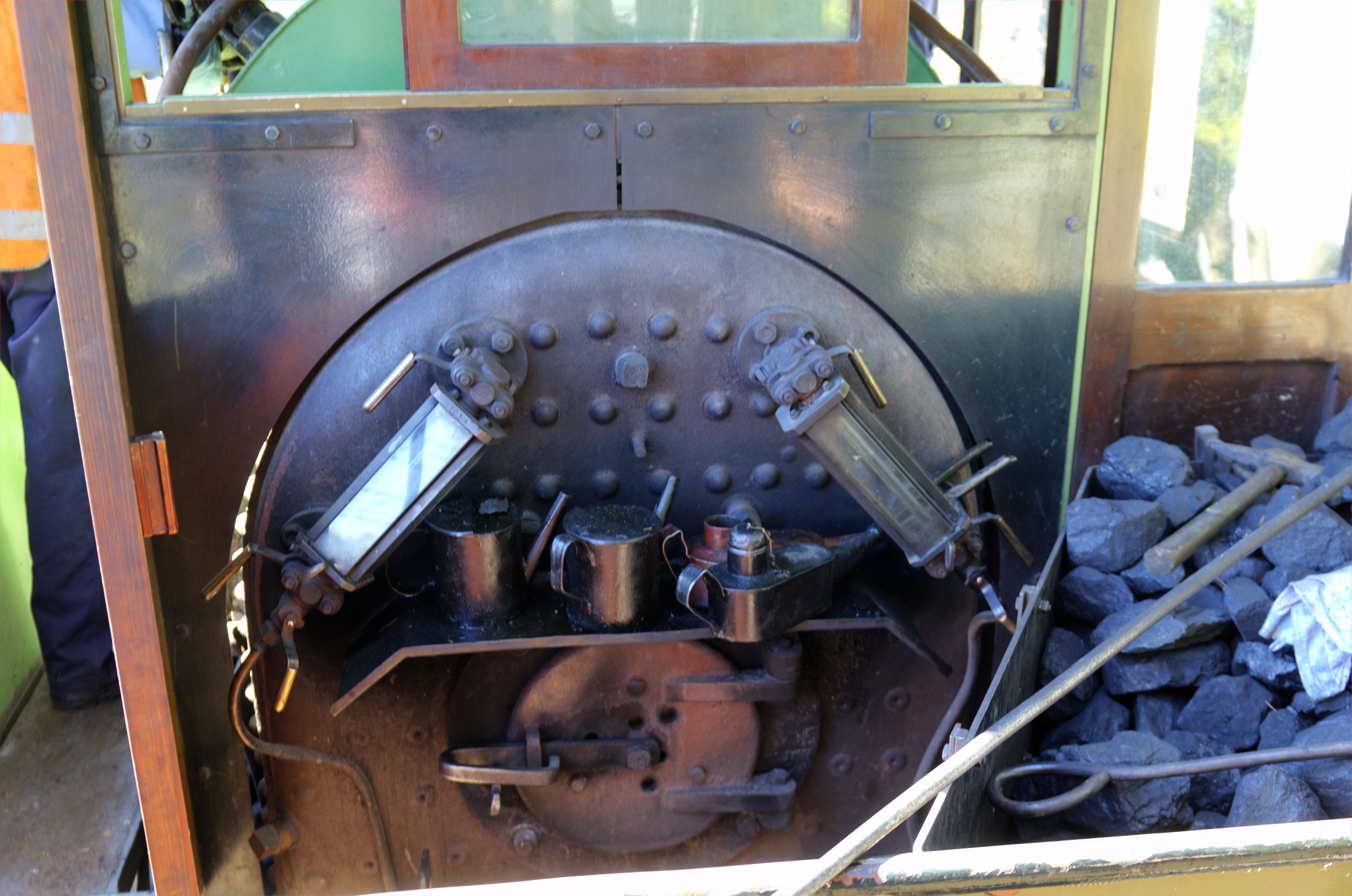
103A Backplate

== See also ==
- McCarth & Chinn, "New South Wales Tramcar Handbook 1861-1961", 1974 SPER
- Burke, David, "Juggernaut: A story of Sydney in the wild Days of the Steam Trams", Kangaroo Press, Roseville, N.S.W.,1997.
- McCarthy, Ken, 'The Era of the Steam Tramway' in "Trolley Wire ", April 1973, Vol. 14 No.2.
