= Dorrigo railway line =

Former railway line in New South Wales

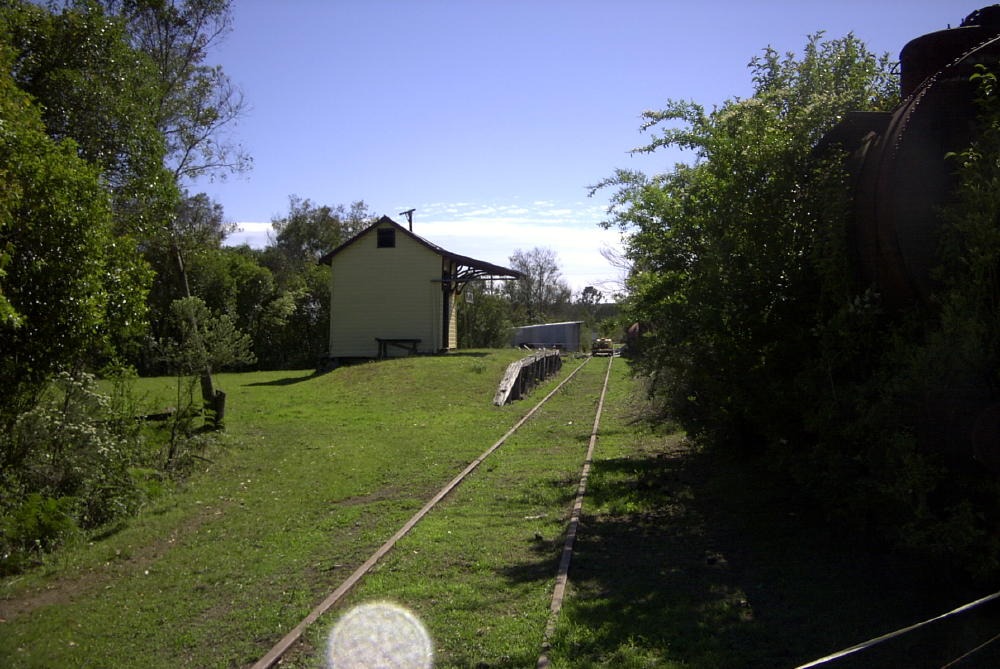
- Ulong railway station

Overview
- Termini: Glenreagh; Dorrigo
- Stations: 11

Service
- Operator(s): NSWGR

History
- Opened: 1924
- Closed: 1972

Technical
- Line length: 41 mi (66 km)
- Number of tracks: 1
- Track gauge: 4 ft 8 1/2 in (1,435 mm) standard gauge
- Highest elevation: 731 m (2,398 ft)

The Dorrigo railway line is a closed railway line in the north of New South Wales, Australia. It branches from the North Coast line at Glenreagh.

== Original scheme ==
The Dorrigo line was intended to be part of a much larger rail system linking the ports of Coffs Harbour and Grafton with the Northern and North western lines. The line would have joined with the system at Guyra, Inverell and Werris Creek. These plans never came to fruition and construction work was commenced on only two sections, between Glenreagh and Dorrigo and Guyra and Dorrigo. Only approximately 13 kilometres (8 mi) of the latter was partially constructed.

== Location ==
Dorrigo, the terminus of the Glenreagh to Dorrigo line, is situated on a plateau at 730 metres (2,395 ft) AHD in dairying country in Australia. It has a consistently high rainfall and is the main township for the area known as "The Dorrigo" (short for 'The Dorrigo Plateau'). The town is situated in a geographical location which could best be described as mountainous. Being a rainforest area, it has a high rainfall and fertile soil, but it is also given to landslides and land subsidence. It was into this setting that a line of railway was built, encountering many difficulties in its construction.

== Development and activities ==
On 28 December 1910 the Glenreagh to Dorrigo Railway Act received assent to sanction the construction. It was not until early August 1914 that construction officially commenced. Because of the First World War, a lack of finance and a dispute with the contractor, progress foundered. The contract was terminated on 28 March 1917 and construction passed to the Railway Commissioners who promptly suspended work.

It was almost two years after the end of the First World War that the Railway Commissioners decided to press ahead with construction. Delays occurred due to landslips and washaway and it was not until 27 September 1924 that a construction train reached Dorrigo. Construction was finalised by 5 December and an inspection of the line was conducted by Railways staff on the 10th.

=== Opening ===
The line opened on 23 December 1924.

=== Operations ===
The Dorrigo line was one of the costliest branch railways built in New South Wales. It had some of the steepest gradients and tightest curves on the system and experienced high maintenance and running costs. It experienced repeated losses throughout its entire existence.

Although goods other than timber were carried, timber was the main revenue source for the railway. Just prior to the suspension of services, there were loadings of up to 13 wagons, mainly of timber from Dorrigo. Most of the logs and processed timber were sent to Sydney. In the early days of the line, the NSWGR obtained sleepers for the North Coast region from the area. These were transported by rail to other centres.

==== Stations ====
- 30°02′58″S 152°59′12″E Glenreagh
- 30°06′13″S 152°54′43″E Timber Top Siding
- 30°09′38″S 152°54′15″E Moleton
- 30°10′31″S 152°54′10″E Mole Creek Tank
- 30°12′24″S 152°53′56″E Lowanna
- 30°14′04″S 152°52′58″E Ulong
- 30°14′54″S 152°50′46″E Brooklana
- 30°14′22″S 152°49′44″E Lloyd
- 30°13′55″S 152°47′24″E Cascade
- 30°14′55″S 152°46′48″E Briggsvale
- 30°16′54″S 152°46′00″E Megan
- 30°18′08″S 152°45′18″E Leigh
- 30°20′01″S 152°42′28″E Dorrigo

=== Closure ===
The line lost its passenger service on 1 December 1957 and goods services were suspended on 27 October 1972 after flood damage. By the end of December 1972, it was becoming apparent there was little prospect of the line re-opening as the Public Transport Commission, the Authority then charged with operating the State's railways, would give no indication of its intentions.

Dorrigo station remained open until November, 1979, providing staff to facilitate the road transport of goods between there and Raleigh.

== Preservation ==
Parts of the line are used by heritage railway organisations Glenreagh Mountain Railway and Dorrigo Steam Railway and Museum.

== See also ==
- Rail transport in New South Wales
