= North American Industry Classification System =

Standard for classifying business establishments

The North American Industry Classification System or NAICS (/neɪks/) is a classification of business establishments by type of economic activity (the process of production). It is used by governments and business in Canada, Mexico, and the United States. It has largely replaced the older Standard Industrial Classification (SIC) system, except in some government agencies, such as the U.S. Securities and Exchange Commission (SEC).

An establishment is typically a single physical location, though administratively distinct operations at a single location may be treated as separate establishments. Each establishment is classified as an industry according to the primary business activity taking place there. NAICS does not offer guidance on organizing enterprises (companies) composed of multiple establishments.

== Codes ==
The NAICS numbering system employs a five or six-digit code at the most detailed industry level. The first five digits are generally (although not always strictly) the same in all three countries. The first two digits designate the largest business sector; the third digit represents the subsector; the fourth digit represents the industry group; the fifth digit designates the NAICS industries, and the sixth digit represents the national industries.

NAICS aggregation levels
| Digit designation | Aggregation level |
|---|---|
| 1-2 | Sector |
| 3 | Subsector |
| 4 | Industry group |
| 5 | Industry |
| 6 | National industry |

Example of NAICS structure
| Code | Titles of categories |
|---|---|
| 54 | Professional, scientific, and technical services |
| 541 | Professional, scientific, and technical services |
| 5411 | Legal services |
| 54111 | Offices of lawyers |
| 541110 | Offices of lawyers |

2017 NAICS Sectors
| Sector # | Description | Note |
|---|---|---|
| 11 | Agriculture, Forestry, Fishing and Hunting | |
| 21 | Mining, Quarrying, and Oil and Gas Extraction | |
| 22 | Utilities | |
| 23 | Construction | |
| 31–33 | Manufacturing | |
| 41–42 | Wholesale Trade | (41 in Canada, 42 in the United States) |
| 44–45 | Retail Trade | |
| 48–49 | Transportation and Warehousing | |
| 51 | Information | (Note: "Information" includes publishing industries, motion picture and sound recording, broadcasting, telecommunications, as well as data processing and hosting.) |
| 52 | Finance and Insurance | |
| 53 | Real Estate and Rental and Leasing | |
| 54 | Professional, Scientific, and Technical Services | |
| 55 | Management of Companies and Enterprises | |
| 56 | Administrative and Support and Waste Management and Remediation Services | |
| 61 | Educational Services | |
| 62 | Health Care and Social Assistance | |
| 71 | Arts, Entertainment, and Recreation | |
| 72 | Accommodation and Food Services | |
| 81 | Other Services (except Public Administration) | |
| 91–92 | Public Administration | (91 in Canada, 92 in the United States) |

== History ==
NAICS is a collaborative effort by Mexico's Instituto Nacional de Estadística y Geografía (INEGI), Statistics Canada, and the United States Office of Management and Budget (OMB), through its Economic Classification Policy Committee (ECPC), staffed by the Bureau of Economic Analysis (BEA), the Bureau of Labor Statistics (BLS), and the Census Bureau. The system is designed to be largely compatible with the United Nations Statistical Office's International Standard Industrial Classification system (ISIC). NAICS versions are released every five years.

With the first version, released in 1997, NAICS offered enhanced service sector coverage relative to the SIC. The 2002 revision accommodated significant changes in the Information Sector. The 2012 revision slightly reduced the number of industries and modified six sectors. NAICS changes are done at intervals of five years; the latest NAICS updated in 2022.

== See also ==
- Global Industry Classification Standard (GICS)
- Industry Classification Benchmark (ICB)
- International Standard Industrial Classification (ISIC)
- North American Product Classification System (NAPCS)
- Standard Industrial Classification (SIC)
- Statistical Classification of Economic Activities in the European Community (NACE)
- Thomson Reuters Business Classification (TRBC)
