= Glenreagh =

- Town
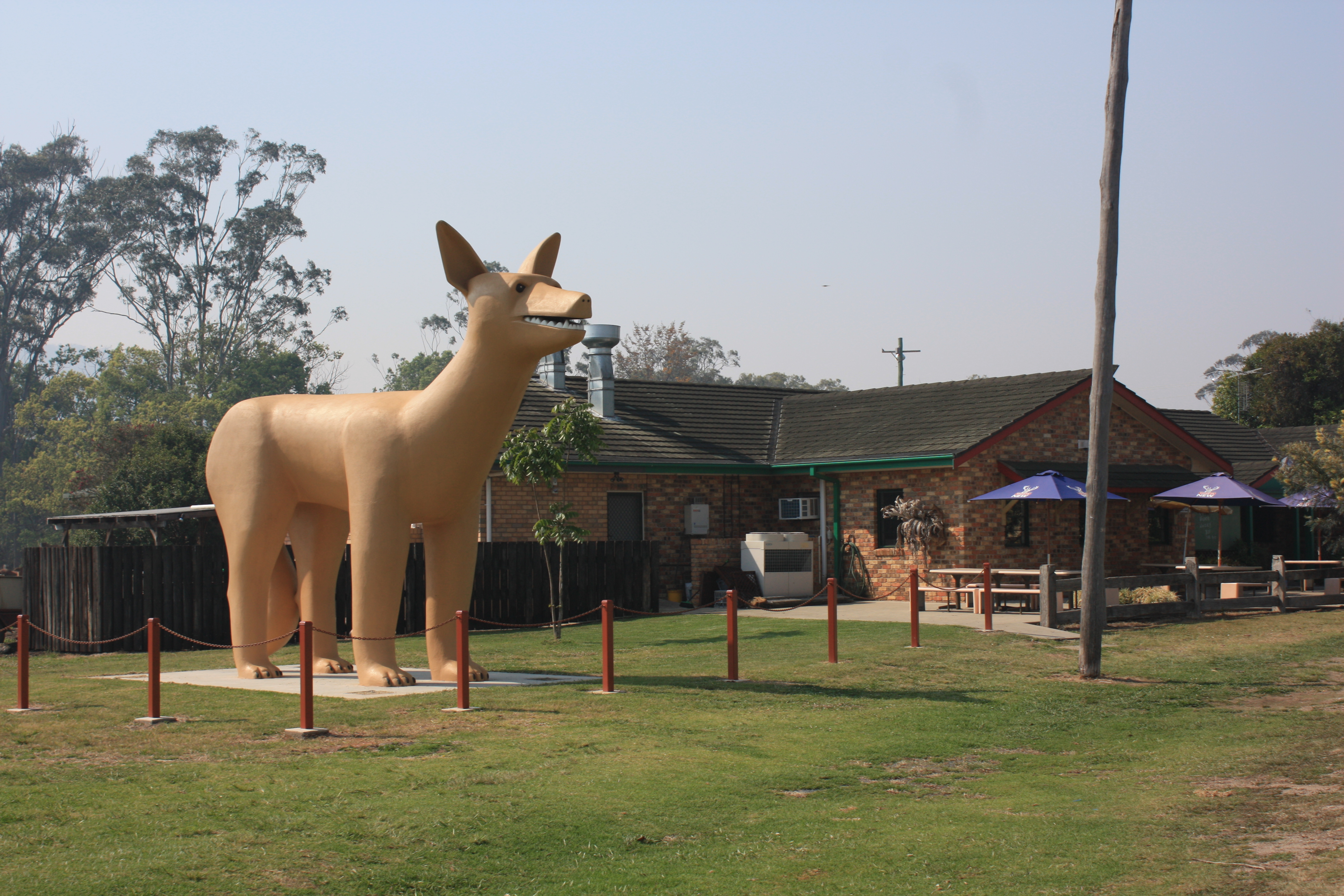
- The Golden Dog Hotel in Glenreagh

- Coordinates: 30°03′S 152°59′E
- Country: Australia
- State: New South Wales
- LGA: Clarence Valley

Government
  - State electorate: Clarence
  - Federal division: Page

Population
  - Total: 562 (2021 census)
- Postcode: 2450

Glenreagh is a small town in the Clarence Valley in the Northern Rivers region of north-eastern New South Wales, Australia. At the 2021 census, Glenreagh had a population of 562 people.

It is on the North Coast railway line, completed to Glenreagh in 1915. A picturesque branch was opened from Glenreagh to Dorrigo in 1924, but was difficult to maintain due to the steep terrain and high rainfall and it was closed in 1972 after a washaway. The Glenreagh to Ulong section is proposed for reopening as a heritage tourist railway by the Glenreagh Mountain Railway.

Historical population
Year	Pop.	±%
1971	222	—
1976	210	−5.4%
1981	233	+11.0%
1986	252	+8.2%
1991	285	+13.1%
1996	276	−3.2%
2001	280	+1.4%
2006	422	+50.7%
2011	477	+13.0%
2016	484	+1.5%
2021	562	+16.1%
Source: Australian Bureau of Statistics data.

== Facilities and services ==
- The Village Market Place (operates first Saturday each month)
- Glenreagh Bakery
- Glenreagh General Store
- The Golden Dog Hotel
- Boo Radley's Hall (lovingly reconstructed hardwood performance hall, dedicated to hosting all forms of live music, painting, and ceramics)

== Annual events ==
- Glenreagh Timber Festival is held on the last Saturday in July of each year.

== School ==
The Glenreagh Public School was established in 1888. As of 2025, the school had 72 students and 6 teaching staff.

== Notes ==
Preceding station	Former services	Following station
Kungala towards Brisbane	North Coast Line	Nana Glen towards Maitland
