= North American Product Classification System =

The North American Product Classification System (NAPCS) is a classification system used by Canada, Mexico, and the United States to classify products produced by industries in those countries. It was scheduled to be implemented from 2007 onwards.

NAPCS is a multi-phase effort by Canada, Mexico, and the United States to develop a comprehensive list of products, product definitions, and product codes that will be organized into an integrated demand-based classification framework that classifies both goods and services according to how they are principally used. It is intended that NAPCS will be used throughout the statistical community to coordinate the collection, tabulation, and analysis of data on the value of products produced by both goods- and services-producing industries and on the prices charged for those products.

The focus in the initial phases of NAPCS will be directed at identifying and defining the products of services-producing industries. NAPCS as a classification system will be a complementary to but independent from the North American Industry Classification System.

== See also ==
- North American Industry Classification System (NAICS)
