= The Refinitiv Business Classification =

Industry classification of global companies

The Reference Business Classification (TRBC) is an industry classification of global companies. It was developed by the Reuters Group under the name Reuters Business Sector Scheme (RBSS), was rebranded to Thomson Reuters Business Classification (TRBC) when the Thomson Corporation acquired the Reuters Group in 2008, forming Thomson Reuters, and was rebranded again, to The Refinitiv Business Classification (TRBC), in 2020. Since the creation of Refinitiv in October 2018, TRBC has been owned and operated by Refinitiv and is the basis for Refinitiv Indices.

== Market-based classification ==
TRBC is a market-based classification scheme, similar to the GICS and ICB systems. These classify companies on the basis of degree of impact on markets, rather than establishment-based classification systems such as the North American Industry Classification System (NAICS).

== Use ==
TRBC is used primarily in the Financial Investment and Advisory space, where investors identify and select groups of comparable companies and look at trends. More specifically, this could be Investment Managers allocating funds and benchmarking their portfolios; Investment Bankers highlighting acquisition targets and opportunities for financial restructuring, or more generally corporates performing competitive analysis of their peers in the marketplace.

== Coverage ==
TRBC covers over 72,000 public companies in 130 countries and provides a classification history going back to 1999.

== Versions ==
Four versions of the classification scheme have been published: RBSS 2004, TRBC 2008, TRBC 2012 and TRBC 2020. The first two versions had four levels: Economic sectors, Business sectors, Industry groups, and Industries. The third version added a fifth level, Activities.

== Structure ==
The TRBC classification scheme has a five-level hierarchical structure:

- 10 Economic sectors
- 33 Business sectors
- 62 Industry groups
- 154 Industries
- 898 Activities

== Classification scheme ==
The TRBC classification scheme is shown below.

Note that the acronym NEC stands for "not elsewhere classified". The use of this acronym, with the same meaning, is common in classification schemes, for example the Standard Industrial Classification (SIC) uses it.

Economic Sector	Business sector	Industry Group	Industry	Activity	Hierarchical ID
Energy	Energy - Fossil Fuels	Coal	Coal	Coal (NEC)	5010101010
Energy	Energy - Fossil Fuels	Coal	Coal	Coal Mining Support	5010101011
Energy	Energy - Fossil Fuels	Coal	Coal	Coal Wholesale	5010101012
Energy	Energy - Fossil Fuels	Oil & Gas	Integrated Oil & Gas	Integrated Oil & Gas	5010201010
Energy	Energy - Fossil Fuels	Oil & Gas	Oil & Gas Exploration and Production	Oil & Gas Exploration and Production (NEC)	5010202010
Energy	Energy - Fossil Fuels	Oil & Gas	Oil & Gas Exploration and Production	Oil Exploration & Production - Onshore	5010202011
Energy	Energy - Fossil Fuels	Oil & Gas	Oil & Gas Exploration and Production	Oil Exploration & Production - Offshore	5010202012
Energy	Energy - Fossil Fuels	Oil & Gas	Oil & Gas Exploration and Production	Natural Gas Exploration & Production - Onshore	5010202013
Energy	Energy - Fossil Fuels	Oil & Gas	Oil & Gas Exploration and Production	Natural Gas Exploration & Production - Offshore	5010202014
Energy	Energy - Fossil Fuels	Oil & Gas	Oil & Gas Exploration and Production	Unconventional Oil & Gas Production	5010202015
Energy	Energy - Fossil Fuels	Oil & Gas	Oil & Gas Refining and Marketing	Oil & Gas Refining and Marketing (NEC)	5010203010
Energy	Energy - Fossil Fuels	Oil & Gas	Oil & Gas Refining and Marketing	Petroleum Refining	5010203011
Energy	Energy - Fossil Fuels	Oil & Gas	Oil & Gas Refining and Marketing	Gasoline Stations	5010203012
Energy	Energy - Fossil Fuels	Oil & Gas	Oil & Gas Refining and Marketing	Petroleum Product Wholesale	5010203013
Energy	Energy - Fossil Fuels	Oil & Gas Related Equipment and Services	Oil & Gas Drilling	Oil & Gas Drilling (NEC)	5010301010
Energy	Energy - Fossil Fuels	Oil & Gas Related Equipment and Services	Oil & Gas Drilling	Oil Drilling - Onshore	5010301011
Energy	Energy - Fossil Fuels	Oil & Gas Related Equipment and Services	Oil & Gas Drilling	Gas Drilling - Onshore	5010301012
Energy	Energy - Fossil Fuels	Oil & Gas Related Equipment and Services	Oil & Gas Drilling	Oil Drilling - Offshore	5010301013
Energy	Energy - Fossil Fuels	Oil & Gas Related Equipment and Services	Oil & Gas Drilling	Gas Drilling - Offshore	5010301014
Energy	Energy - Fossil Fuels	Oil & Gas Related Equipment and Services	Oil & Gas Drilling	Unconventional Oil & Gas Drilling	5010301015
Energy	Energy - Fossil Fuels	Oil & Gas Related Equipment and Services	Oil Related Services and Equipment	Oil Related Services and Equipment (NEC)	5010302010
Energy	Energy - Fossil Fuels	Oil & Gas Related Equipment and Services	Oil Related Services and Equipment	Oil Related Services	5010302011
Energy	Energy - Fossil Fuels	Oil & Gas Related Equipment and Services	Oil Related Services and Equipment	Oil Related Equipment	5010302012
Energy	Energy - Fossil Fuels	Oil & Gas Related Equipment and Services	Oil Related Services and Equipment	Oil Related - Surveying & Mapping Services	5010302013
Energy	Energy - Fossil Fuels	Oil & Gas Related Equipment and Services	Oil & Gas Transportation Services	Oil & Gas Transportation Services (NEC)	5010303010
Energy	Energy - Fossil Fuels	Oil & Gas Related Equipment and Services	Oil & Gas Transportation Services	LNG Transportation & Storage	5010303011
Energy	Energy - Fossil Fuels	Oil & Gas Related Equipment and Services	Oil & Gas Transportation Services	Natural Gas Pipeline Transportation	5010303012
Energy	Energy - Fossil Fuels	Oil & Gas Related Equipment and Services	Oil & Gas Transportation Services	Oil Pipeline Transportation	5010303013
Energy	Energy - Fossil Fuels	Oil & Gas Related Equipment and Services	Oil & Gas Transportation Services	Sea-Borne Tankers	5010303014
Energy	Energy - Fossil Fuels	Oil & Gas Related Equipment and Services	Oil & Gas Transportation Services	Oil & Gas Storage	5010303015
Energy	Renewable Energy	Renewable Energy	Renewable Energy Equipment & Services	Renewable Energy Equipment & Services (NEC)	5020101010
Energy	Renewable Energy	Renewable Energy	Renewable Energy Equipment & Services	Wind Systems & Equipment	5020101011
Energy	Renewable Energy	Renewable Energy	Renewable Energy Equipment & Services	Stationary Fuel Cells	5020101012
Energy	Renewable Energy	Renewable Energy	Renewable Energy Equipment & Services	Photovoltaic Solar Systems & Equipment	5020101013
Energy	Renewable Energy	Renewable Energy	Renewable Energy Equipment & Services	Thermal Solar Systems & Equipment	5020101014
Energy	Renewable Energy	Renewable Energy	Renewable Energy Equipment & Services	Biomass Power Energy Equipment	5020101015
Energy	Renewable Energy	Renewable Energy	Renewable Energy Equipment & Services	Waste to Energy Systems & Equipment	5020101016
Energy	Renewable Energy	Renewable Energy	Renewable Energy Equipment & Services	Hydropower Equipment	5020101017
Energy	Renewable Energy	Renewable Energy	Renewable Energy Equipment & Services	Wave Power Energy Equipment	5020101018
Energy	Renewable Energy	Renewable Energy	Renewable Energy Equipment & Services	Renewable Energy Services	5020101019
Energy	Renewable Energy	Renewable Energy	Renewable Energy Equipment & Services	Geothermal Equipment	5020101020
Energy	Renewable Energy	Renewable Energy	Renewable Fuels	Renewable Fuels (NEC)	5020102010
Energy	Renewable Energy	Renewable Energy	Renewable Fuels	Biodiesel	5020102011
Energy	Renewable Energy	Renewable Energy	Renewable Fuels	Ethanol Fuels	5020102012
Energy	Renewable Energy	Renewable Energy	Renewable Fuels	Pyrolytic & Synthetic Fuels	5020102013
Energy	Renewable Energy	Renewable Energy	Renewable Fuels	Biomass & Biogas Fuels	5020102014
Energy	Renewable Energy	Renewable Energy	Renewable Fuels	Hydrogen Fuel	5020102015
Energy	Uranium	Uranium	Uranium	Uranium (NEC)	5030101010
Energy	Uranium	Uranium	Uranium	Uranium Mining	5030101011
Energy	Uranium	Uranium	Uranium	Uranium Processing	5030101012
Basic Materials	Chemicals	Chemicals	Commodity Chemicals	Commodity Chemicals (NEC)	5110101010
Basic Materials	Chemicals	Chemicals	Commodity Chemicals	Plastics	5110101011
Basic Materials	Chemicals	Chemicals	Commodity Chemicals	Paints & Coatings	5110101012
Basic Materials	Chemicals	Chemicals	Commodity Chemicals	Tanning & Softening Agents	5110101013
Basic Materials	Chemicals	Chemicals	Commodity Chemicals	Explosives	5110101014
Basic Materials	Chemicals	Chemicals	Commodity Chemicals	Industrial Gases	5110101015
Basic Materials	Chemicals	Chemicals	Commodity Chemicals	Commodity Chemicals Wholesale	5110101016
Basic Materials	Chemicals	Chemicals	Commodity Chemicals	Glass	5110101017
Basic Materials	Chemicals	Chemicals	Agricultural Chemicals	Agricultural Chemicals (NEC)	5110102010
Basic Materials	Chemicals	Chemicals	Agricultural Chemicals	Fertilizers	5110102011
Basic Materials	Chemicals	Chemicals	Agricultural Chemicals	Pesticides	5110102012
Basic Materials	Chemicals	Chemicals	Agricultural Chemicals	Organic Fertilizers	5110102013
Basic Materials	Chemicals	Chemicals	Agricultural Chemicals	Agricultural Chemicals Wholesale	5110102014
Basic Materials	Chemicals	Chemicals	Specialty Chemicals	Specialty Chemicals (NEC)	5110103010
Basic Materials	Chemicals	Chemicals	Specialty Chemicals	Coloring Agents	5110103011
Basic Materials	Chemicals	Chemicals	Specialty Chemicals	Synthetic Fibers	5110103012
Basic Materials	Chemicals	Chemicals	Specialty Chemicals	Advanced Polymers	5110103014
Basic Materials	Chemicals	Chemicals	Specialty Chemicals	Industrial Biotechnology Chemicals	5110103016
Basic Materials	Chemicals	Chemicals	Specialty Chemicals	Specialty Chemicals Wholesale	5110103017
Basic Materials	Chemicals	Chemicals	Specialty Chemicals	Composites	5110103018
Basic Materials	Chemicals	Chemicals	Specialty Chemicals	Adhesive & Epoxy	5110103019
Basic Materials	Chemicals	Chemicals	Diversified Chemicals	Diversified Chemicals	5110109010
Basic Materials	Mineral Resources	Metals & Mining	Non-Gold Precious Metals & Minerals	Non-Gold Precious Metals & Minerals (NEC)	5120101010
Basic Materials	Mineral Resources	Metals & Mining	Non-Gold Precious Metals & Minerals	Silver Mining	5120101011
Basic Materials	Mineral Resources	Metals & Mining	Non-Gold Precious Metals & Minerals	Platinum Mining	5120101012
Basic Materials	Mineral Resources	Metals & Mining	Non-Gold Precious Metals & Minerals	Diamond Mining	5120101013
Basic Materials	Mineral Resources	Metals & Mining	Non-Gold Precious Metals & Minerals	Semiprecious Gem Stones	5120101014
Basic Materials	Mineral Resources	Metals & Mining	Non-Gold Precious Metals & Minerals	Pearl Cultivation	5120101015
Basic Materials	Mineral Resources	Metals & Mining	Non-Gold Precious Metals & Minerals	Rare Earth Minerals	5120101016
Basic Materials	Mineral Resources	Metals & Mining	Iron & Steel	Iron & Steel (NEC)	5120102010
Basic Materials	Mineral Resources	Metals & Mining	Iron & Steel	Iron Ore Mining	5120102011
Basic Materials	Mineral Resources	Metals & Mining	Iron & Steel	Coke Coal Mining	5120102012
Basic Materials	Mineral Resources	Metals & Mining	Iron & Steel	Iron, Steel Mills & Foundries	5120102013
Basic Materials	Mineral Resources	Metals & Mining	Iron & Steel	Metal Service Centers	5120102014
Basic Materials	Mineral Resources	Metals & Mining	Iron & Steel	Metallic Rolling & Drawing Products	5120102015
Basic Materials	Mineral Resources	Metals & Mining	Iron & Steel	Metal Merchant Wholesale	5120102016
Basic Materials	Mineral Resources	Metals & Mining	Aluminum	Aluminum (NEC)	5120103010
Basic Materials	Mineral Resources	Metals & Mining	Aluminum	Primary Aluminum Production	5120103011
Basic Materials	Mineral Resources	Metals & Mining	Aluminum	Secondary Smelting & Alloying of Aluminum	5120103012
Basic Materials	Mineral Resources	Metals & Mining	Aluminum	Aluminum Rolling	5120103013
Basic Materials	Mineral Resources	Metals & Mining	Aluminum	Aluminum Refining	5120103014
Basic Materials	Mineral Resources	Metals & Mining	Aluminum	Aluminum Wholesale	5120103015
Basic Materials	Mineral Resources	Metals & Mining	Aluminum	Bauxite Mining	5120103016
Basic Materials	Mineral Resources	Metals & Mining	Specialty Mining & Metals	Specialty Mining & Metals (NEC)	5120105010
Basic Materials	Mineral Resources	Metals & Mining	Specialty Mining & Metals	Lead Ore Mining	5120105011
Basic Materials	Mineral Resources	Metals & Mining	Specialty Mining & Metals	Copper Ore Mining	5120105012
Basic Materials	Mineral Resources	Metals & Mining	Specialty Mining & Metals	Nickel Ore Mining	5120105013
Basic Materials	Mineral Resources	Metals & Mining	Specialty Mining & Metals	Zinc Ore Mining	5120105014
Basic Materials	Mineral Resources	Metals & Mining	Specialty Mining & Metals	Nonferrous Metal Mining	5120105015
Basic Materials	Mineral Resources	Metals & Mining	Specialty Mining & Metals	Nonferrous Metal Processing	5120105016
Basic Materials	Mineral Resources	Metals & Mining	Specialty Mining & Metals	Specialty Mining & Metals Wholesale	5120105017
Basic Materials	Mineral Resources	Metals & Mining	Gold	Gold (NEC)	5120106010
Basic Materials	Mineral Resources	Metals & Mining	Gold	Gold Mining	5120106011
Basic Materials	Mineral Resources	Metals & Mining	Gold	Gold Refining	5120106012
Basic Materials	Mineral Resources	Metals & Mining	Mining Support Services & Equipment	Mining Support Services & Equipment (NEC)	5120107010
Basic Materials	Mineral Resources	Metals & Mining	Mining Support Services & Equipment	Geophysical Surveying & Mapping Services	5120107011
Basic Materials	Mineral Resources	Metals & Mining	Mining Support Services & Equipment	Mining Support Services	5120107012
Basic Materials	Mineral Resources	Metals & Mining	Mining Support Services & Equipment	Mining Machinery & Equipment Manufacturing	5120107013
Basic Materials	Mineral Resources	Metals & Mining	Diversified Mining	Diversified Mining	5120108010
Basic Materials	Mineral Resources	Construction Materials	Construction Materials	Construction Materials (NEC)	5120201010
Basic Materials	Mineral Resources	Construction Materials	Construction Materials	Construction Material Processing	5120201011
Basic Materials	Mineral Resources	Construction Materials	Construction Materials	Cement & Concrete Manufacturing	5120201012
Basic Materials	Mineral Resources	Construction Materials	Construction Materials	Tile & Paving Material Manufacturing	5120201013
Basic Materials	Mineral Resources	Construction Materials	Construction Materials	Rock Mining	5120201014
Basic Materials	Mineral Resources	Construction Materials	Construction Materials	Construction Material Wholesale	5120201015
Basic Materials	Applied Resources	Paper & Forest Products	Forest & Wood Products	Forest & Wood Products (NEC)	5130101010
Basic Materials	Applied Resources	Paper & Forest Products	Forest & Wood Products	Timber Tract Operations	5130101011
Basic Materials	Applied Resources	Paper & Forest Products	Forest & Wood Products	Forest Nurseries & Gathering of Forest Products	5130101012
Basic Materials	Applied Resources	Paper & Forest Products	Forest & Wood Products	Logging & Sawmills	5130101013
Basic Materials	Applied Resources	Paper & Forest Products	Forest & Wood Products	Forest Support & Services	5130101014
Basic Materials	Applied Resources	Paper & Forest Products	Forest & Wood Products	Wood Products	5130101015
Basic Materials	Applied Resources	Paper & Forest Products	Forest & Wood Products	Wood Product Wholesale	5130101016
Basic Materials	Applied Resources	Paper & Forest Products	Paper Products	Paper Products (NEC)	5130102010
Basic Materials	Applied Resources	Paper & Forest Products	Paper Products	Paper Mills & Products	5130102011
Basic Materials	Applied Resources	Paper & Forest Products	Paper Products	Newsprint Mills	5130102012
Basic Materials	Applied Resources	Paper & Forest Products	Paper Products	Pulp Mills	5130102013
Basic Materials	Applied Resources	Paper & Forest Products	Paper Products	Paper Product Wholesale	5130102014
Basic Materials	Applied Resources	Containers & Packaging	Non-Paper Containers & Packaging	Non-Paper Containers & Packaging (NEC)	5130201010
Basic Materials	Applied Resources	Containers & Packaging	Non-Paper Containers & Packaging	Textile Containers & Packaging	5130201011
Basic Materials	Applied Resources	Containers & Packaging	Non-Paper Containers & Packaging	Glass Containers & Packaging	5130201012
Basic Materials	Applied Resources	Containers & Packaging	Non-Paper Containers & Packaging	Metal Containers & Packaging	5130201013
Basic Materials	Applied Resources	Containers & Packaging	Non-Paper Containers & Packaging	Plastic Containers & Packaging	5130201014
Basic Materials	Applied Resources	Containers & Packaging	Non-Paper Containers & Packaging	Wood Container & Packaging	5130201015
Basic Materials	Applied Resources	Containers & Packaging	Non-Paper Containers & Packaging	Container & Packaging Material Wholesale	5130201016
Basic Materials	Applied Resources	Containers & Packaging	Paper Packaging	Paper Packaging (NEC)	5130202010
Basic Materials	Applied Resources	Containers & Packaging	Paper Packaging	Paper Packaging Wholesale	5130202011
Industrials	Industrial Goods	Aerospace & Defense	Aerospace & Defense	Aerospace & Defense (NEC)	5210101010
Industrials	Industrial Goods	Aerospace & Defense	Aerospace & Defense	Arms & Ammunitions Manufacturing	5210101011
Industrials	Industrial Goods	Aerospace & Defense	Aerospace & Defense	Commercial Aircraft Manufacturing	5210101012
Industrials	Industrial Goods	Aerospace & Defense	Aerospace & Defense	Military Aircraft Manufacturing	5210101013
Industrials	Industrial Goods	Aerospace & Defense	Aerospace & Defense	Aircraft Parts Manufacturing	5210101014
Industrials	Industrial Goods	Aerospace & Defense	Aerospace & Defense	Military Vehicles Manufacturing	5210101015
Industrials	Industrial Goods	Aerospace & Defense	Aerospace & Defense	Satellite Design & Manufacture	5210101016
Industrials	Industrial Goods	Aerospace & Defense	Aerospace & Defense	Spacecraft Manufacturing	5210101017
Industrials	Industrial Goods	Aerospace & Defense	Aerospace & Defense	Military Clothing & Accessories	5210101018
Industrials	Industrial Goods	Aerospace & Defense	Aerospace & Defense	Aircraft Equipment Wholesale	5210101019
Industrials	Industrial Goods	Aerospace & Defense	Aerospace & Defense	Aerospace & Defense Electronics	5210101020
Industrials	Industrial Goods	Aerospace & Defense	Aerospace & Defense	Drone Manufacturing	5210101021
Industrials	Industrial Goods	Machinery, Tools, Heavy Vehicles, Trains & Ships	Industrial Machinery & Equipment	Industrial Machinery & Equipment (NEC)	5210201010
Industrials	Industrial Goods	Machinery, Tools, Heavy Vehicles, Trains & Ships	Industrial Machinery & Equipment	Industrial Components	5210201011
Industrials	Industrial Goods	Machinery, Tools, Heavy Vehicles, Trains & Ships	Industrial Machinery & Equipment	Industrial Machinery	5210201012
Industrials	Industrial Goods	Machinery, Tools, Heavy Vehicles, Trains & Ships	Industrial Machinery & Equipment	Ball & Roller Bearings	5210201013
Industrials	Industrial Goods	Machinery, Tools, Heavy Vehicles, Trains & Ships	Industrial Machinery & Equipment	Testing & Measuring Equipment	5210201014
Industrials	Industrial Goods	Machinery, Tools, Heavy Vehicles, Trains & Ships	Industrial Machinery & Equipment	Pump & Pumping Equipment	5210201015
Industrials	Industrial Goods	Machinery, Tools, Heavy Vehicles, Trains & Ships	Industrial Machinery & Equipment	Air & Gas Compressors	5210201016
Industrials	Industrial Goods	Machinery, Tools, Heavy Vehicles, Trains & Ships	Industrial Machinery & Equipment	Welding & Soldering Equipment	5210201017
Industrials	Industrial Goods	Machinery, Tools, Heavy Vehicles, Trains & Ships	Industrial Machinery & Equipment	Industrial Process Furnace & Ovens	5210201018
Industrials	Industrial Goods	Machinery, Tools, Heavy Vehicles, Trains & Ships	Industrial Machinery & Equipment	Fluid Power Cylinder & Actuators	5210201019
Industrials	Industrial Goods	Machinery, Tools, Heavy Vehicles, Trains & Ships	Industrial Machinery & Equipment	Automatic Vending Machines	5210201020
Industrials	Industrial Goods	Machinery, Tools, Heavy Vehicles, Trains & Ships	Industrial Machinery & Equipment	Industrial Moulds	5210201021
Industrials	Industrial Goods	Machinery, Tools, Heavy Vehicles, Trains & Ships	Industrial Machinery & Equipment	Machine Tools	5210201022
Industrials	Industrial Goods	Machinery, Tools, Heavy Vehicles, Trains & Ships	Industrial Machinery & Equipment	Industrial Valve Manufacturing	5210201023
Industrials	Industrial Goods	Machinery, Tools, Heavy Vehicles, Trains & Ships	Industrial Machinery & Equipment	Industrial Machinery & Equipment Wholesale	5210201024
Industrials	Industrial Goods	Machinery, Tools, Heavy Vehicles, Trains & Ships	Industrial Machinery & Equipment	Commercial Equipment	5210201025
Industrials	Industrial Goods	Machinery, Tools, Heavy Vehicles, Trains & Ships	Heavy Machinery & Vehicles	Heavy Machinery & Vehicles (NEC)	5210202010
Industrials	Industrial Goods	Machinery, Tools, Heavy Vehicles, Trains & Ships	Heavy Machinery & Vehicles	Construction Machinery	5210202011
Industrials	Industrial Goods	Machinery, Tools, Heavy Vehicles, Trains & Ships	Heavy Machinery & Vehicles	Heavy Trucks	5210202012
Industrials	Industrial Goods	Machinery, Tools, Heavy Vehicles, Trains & Ships	Heavy Machinery & Vehicles	Heavy Buses & Coaches	5210202013
Industrials	Industrial Goods	Machinery, Tools, Heavy Vehicles, Trains & Ships	Heavy Machinery & Vehicles	Locomotive Engines & Rolling Stock	5210202014
Industrials	Industrial Goods	Machinery, Tools, Heavy Vehicles, Trains & Ships	Heavy Machinery & Vehicles	Agricultural Machinery	5210202015
Industrials	Industrial Goods	Machinery, Tools, Heavy Vehicles, Trains & Ships	Heavy Machinery & Vehicles	Commercial Landscaping Equipment	5210202016
Industrials	Industrial Goods	Machinery, Tools, Heavy Vehicles, Trains & Ships	Heavy Machinery & Vehicles	Heavy Machinery & Vehicles Wholesale	5210202017
Industrials	Industrial Goods	Machinery, Tools, Heavy Vehicles, Trains & Ships	Electrical Components & Equipment	Electrical Components & Equipment (NEC)	5210203010
Industrials	Industrial Goods	Machinery, Tools, Heavy Vehicles, Trains & Ships	Electrical Components & Equipment	Batteries & Uninterruptible Power Supplies	5210203011
Industrials	Industrial Goods	Machinery, Tools, Heavy Vehicles, Trains & Ships	Electrical Components & Equipment	Wires & Cables	5210203012
Industrials	Industrial Goods	Machinery, Tools, Heavy Vehicles, Trains & Ships	Electrical Components & Equipment	Electrical Components	5210203013
Industrials	Industrial Goods	Machinery, Tools, Heavy Vehicles, Trains & Ships	Electrical Components & Equipment	Lighting Equipment	5210203014
Industrials	Industrial Goods	Machinery, Tools, Heavy Vehicles, Trains & Ships	Electrical Components & Equipment	Heating, Ventilation & Air Conditioning Systems	5210203015
Industrials	Industrial Goods	Machinery, Tools, Heavy Vehicles, Trains & Ships	Electrical Components & Equipment	Electrical Insulators	5210203016
Industrials	Industrial Goods	Machinery, Tools, Heavy Vehicles, Trains & Ships	Electrical Components & Equipment	Switchgear	5210203017
Industrials	Industrial Goods	Machinery, Tools, Heavy Vehicles, Trains & Ships	Electrical Components & Equipment	Portable Motors & Generators	5210203018
Industrials	Industrial Goods	Machinery, Tools, Heavy Vehicles, Trains & Ships	Electrical Components & Equipment	Electrical Measuring & Testing Instruments	5210203019
Industrials	Industrial Goods	Machinery, Tools, Heavy Vehicles, Trains & Ships	Electrical Components & Equipment	Electric Equipment Wholesale	5210203020
Industrials	Industrial Goods	Machinery, Tools, Heavy Vehicles, Trains & Ships	Heavy Electrical Equipment	Heavy Electrical Equipment (NEC)	5210204010
Industrials	Industrial Goods	Machinery, Tools, Heavy Vehicles, Trains & Ships	Heavy Electrical Equipment	Electrical Transmission & Grid Equipment	5210204011
Industrials	Industrial Goods	Machinery, Tools, Heavy Vehicles, Trains & Ships	Heavy Electrical Equipment	Elevator & Conveying Equipment	5210204012
Industrials	Industrial Goods	Machinery, Tools, Heavy Vehicles, Trains & Ships	Heavy Electrical Equipment	Turbine Manufacturing	5210204013
Industrials	Industrial Goods	Machinery, Tools, Heavy Vehicles, Trains & Ships	Heavy Electrical Equipment	Heavy Motors & Generators	5210204014
Industrials	Industrial Goods	Machinery, Tools, Heavy Vehicles, Trains & Ships	Heavy Electrical Equipment	Industrial Electrical Switchgear	5210204015
Industrials	Industrial Goods	Machinery, Tools, Heavy Vehicles, Trains & Ships	Heavy Electrical Equipment	Nuclear Generators & Components	5210204016
Industrials	Industrial Goods	Machinery, Tools, Heavy Vehicles, Trains & Ships	Shipbuilding	Shipbuilding (NEC)	5210205010
Industrials	Industrial Goods	Machinery, Tools, Heavy Vehicles, Trains & Ships	Shipbuilding	Ship Parts Manufacturers	5210205011
Industrials	Industrial Goods	Machinery, Tools, Heavy Vehicles, Trains & Ships	Shipbuilding	Ship Repairing & Maintenance	5210205012
Industrials	Industrial & Commercial Services	Construction & Engineering	Construction & Engineering	Construction & Engineering (NEC)	5220102010
Industrials	Industrial & Commercial Services	Construction & Engineering	Construction & Engineering	Commercial Buildings	5220102011
Industrials	Industrial & Commercial Services	Construction & Engineering	Construction & Engineering	Highway & Bridge Construction	5220102012
Industrials	Industrial & Commercial Services	Construction & Engineering	Construction & Engineering	Railway Construction	5220102013
Industrials	Industrial & Commercial Services	Construction & Engineering	Construction & Engineering	Power & Communications Network Construction	5220102014
Industrials	Industrial & Commercial Services	Construction & Engineering	Construction & Engineering	Civil Engineers & Architects	5220102015
Industrials	Industrial & Commercial Services	Construction & Engineering	Construction & Engineering	Building Contractors	5220102016
Industrials	Industrial & Commercial Services	Construction & Engineering	Construction & Engineering	Industrial Plant Construction	5220102017
Industrials	Industrial & Commercial Services	Construction & Engineering	Construction & Engineering	Water & Sewage Construction	5220102018
Industrials	Industrial & Commercial Services	Construction & Engineering	Construction & Engineering	Land Division & Subdivision	5220102019
Industrials	Industrial & Commercial Services	Construction & Engineering	Construction & Engineering	Gas Infrastructure Construction	5220102020
Industrials	Industrial & Commercial Services	Construction & Engineering	Construction & Engineering	Electric Power Plant Construction	5220102021
Industrials	Industrial & Commercial Services	Construction & Engineering	Construction & Engineering	Nuclear Power Plant Construction	5220102022
Industrials	Industrial & Commercial Services	Construction & Engineering	Construction & Engineering	Telecommunication Construction	5220102023
Industrials	Industrial & Commercial Services	Diversified Industrial Goods Wholesale	Diversified Industrial Goods Wholesale	Diversified Industrial Goods Wholesale	5220201010
Industrials	Industrial & Commercial Services	Professional & Commercial Services	Environmental Services & Equipment	Environmental Services & Equipment (NEC)	5220301010
Industrials	Industrial & Commercial Services	Professional & Commercial Services	Environmental Services & Equipment	Purification & Treatment Equipment	5220301011
Industrials	Industrial & Commercial Services	Professional & Commercial Services	Environmental Services & Equipment	Waste Management, Disposal & Recycling Services	5220301012
Industrials	Industrial & Commercial Services	Professional & Commercial Services	Environmental Services & Equipment	Environmental Consultancy Services	5220301013
Industrials	Industrial & Commercial Services	Professional & Commercial Services	Environmental Services & Equipment	Environmental R&D Services & Biotechnology	5220301014
Industrials	Industrial & Commercial Services	Professional & Commercial Services	Environmental Services & Equipment	Carbon Capture & Storage	5220301015
Industrials	Industrial & Commercial Services	Professional & Commercial Services	Commercial Printing Services	Commercial Printing Services (NEC)	5220302010
Industrials	Industrial & Commercial Services	Professional & Commercial Services	Commercial Printing Services	Specialized Printing Services	5220302011
Industrials	Industrial & Commercial Services	Professional & Commercial Services	Commercial Printing Services	Newspaper & Magazine Printing Services	5220302012
Industrials	Industrial & Commercial Services	Professional & Commercial Services	Commercial Printing Services	Book Printing Services	5220302013
Industrials	Industrial & Commercial Services	Professional & Commercial Services	Employment Services	Employment Services (NEC)	5220303010
Industrials	Industrial & Commercial Services	Professional & Commercial Services	Employment Services	Human Resources Consulting Services	5220303011
Industrials	Industrial & Commercial Services	Professional & Commercial Services	Employment Services	Outsourcing & Staffing Services	5220303012
Industrials	Industrial & Commercial Services	Professional & Commercial Services	Employment Services	Executive Search Services	5220303013
Industrials	Industrial & Commercial Services	Professional & Commercial Services	Employment Services	Online Job Portals	5220303014
Industrials	Industrial & Commercial Services	Professional & Commercial Services	Business Support Services	Business Support Services (NEC)	5220304010
Industrials	Industrial & Commercial Services	Professional & Commercial Services	Business Support Services	Corporate Accounting Services	5220304011
Industrials	Industrial & Commercial Services	Professional & Commercial Services	Business Support Services	Legal Services	5220304012
Industrials	Industrial & Commercial Services	Professional & Commercial Services	Business Support Services	Management Consulting Services	5220304013
Industrials	Industrial & Commercial Services	Professional & Commercial Services	Business Support Services	Security Services	5220304014
Industrials	Industrial & Commercial Services	Professional & Commercial Services	Business Support Services	Cleaning Services	5220304016
Industrials	Industrial & Commercial Services	Professional & Commercial Services	Business Support Services	Data Processing Services	5220304017
Industrials	Industrial & Commercial Services	Professional & Commercial Services	Business Support Services	Industrial Equipment Rental	5220304018
Industrials	Industrial & Commercial Services	Professional & Commercial Services	Business Support Services	Office Equipment & Supplies Rental	5220304019
Industrials	Industrial & Commercial Services	Professional & Commercial Services	Business Support Services	Pest Control Services	5220304020
Industrials	Industrial & Commercial Services	Professional & Commercial Services	Business Support Services	Maintenance & Repair Services	5220304021
Industrials	Industrial & Commercial Services	Professional & Commercial Services	Business Support Services	Industrial Design Services	5220304022
Industrials	Industrial & Commercial Services	Professional & Commercial Services	Business Support Services	Translation & Interpretation Services	5220304023
Industrials	Industrial & Commercial Services	Professional & Commercial Services	Business Support Services	Testing Laboratories	5220304024
Industrials	Industrial & Commercial Services	Professional & Commercial Services	Business Support Services	Call Center Services	5220304025
Industrials	Industrial & Commercial Services	Professional & Commercial Services	Business Support Services	Exhibition & Conference Services	5220304026
Industrials	Industrial & Commercial Services	Professional & Commercial Services	Business Support Services	Transaction & Payment Services	5220304027
Industrials	Industrial & Commercial Services	Professional & Commercial Services	Business Support Supplies	Business Support Supplies (NEC)	5220306010
Industrials	Industrial & Commercial Services	Professional & Commercial Services	Business Support Supplies	Office Furniture	5220306011
Industrials	Industrial & Commercial Services	Professional & Commercial Services	Business Support Supplies	Office Supplies	5220306012
Industrials	Industrial & Commercial Services	Professional & Commercial Services	Business Support Supplies	Health, Safety & Fire Protection Equipment	5220306013
Industrials	Industrial & Commercial Services	Professional & Commercial Services	Business Support Supplies	Office Supplies Wholesale	5220306014
Industrials	Industrial & Commercial Services	Professional & Commercial Services	Professional Information Services	Professional Information Services (NEC)	5220307010
Industrials	Industrial & Commercial Services	Professional & Commercial Services	Professional Information Services	Financial Information Providers	5220307011
Industrials	Industrial & Commercial Services	Professional & Commercial Services	Professional Information Services	Compliance & Investor Communication	5220307012
Industrials	Industrial & Commercial Services	Professional & Commercial Services	Professional Information Services	Rating Agencies	5220307013
Industrials	Industrial & Commercial Services	Professional & Commercial Services	Professional Information Services	Trade & Business Publishing	5220307014
Industrials	Industrial & Commercial Services	Professional & Commercial Services	Professional Information Services	Legal & Tax Information Providers	5220307015
Industrials	Industrial & Commercial Services	Professional & Commercial Services	Professional Information Services	Education & Training Information Providers	5220307016
Industrials	Industrial & Commercial Services	Professional & Commercial Services	Professional Information Services	Journals & Scholarly Research	5220307017
Industrials	Industrial & Commercial Services	Professional & Commercial Services	Professional Information Services	News Agencies	5220307018
Industrials	Industrial & Commercial Services	Professional & Commercial Services	Professional Information Services	Libraries & Archives	5220307019
Industrials	Transportation	Freight & Logistics Services	Courier, Postal, Air Freight & Land-based Logistics	Courier, Postal, Air Freight & Land-based Logistics (NEC)	5240501010
Industrials	Transportation	Freight & Logistics Services	Courier, Postal, Air Freight & Land-based Logistics	Freight Logistics	5240501011
Industrials	Transportation	Freight & Logistics Services	Courier, Postal, Air Freight & Land-based Logistics	Air Freight	5240501012
Industrials	Transportation	Freight & Logistics Services	Courier, Postal, Air Freight & Land-based Logistics	Courier Services	5240501013
Industrials	Transportation	Freight & Logistics Services	Courier, Postal, Air Freight & Land-based Logistics	Integrated Logistics Operators	5240501014
Industrials	Transportation	Freight & Logistics Services	Marine Freight & Logistics	Marine Freight & Logistics (NEC)	5240502010
Industrials	Transportation	Freight & Logistics Services	Marine Freight & Logistics	Marine Logistics	5240502011
Industrials	Transportation	Freight & Logistics Services	Marine Freight & Logistics	Inland Water Freight	5240502012
Industrials	Transportation	Freight & Logistics Services	Marine Freight & Logistics	Deep Sea Freight	5240502013
Industrials	Transportation	Freight & Logistics Services	Ground Freight & Logistics	Ground Freight & Logistics (NEC)	5240503010
Industrials	Transportation	Freight & Logistics Services	Ground Freight & Logistics	Railway Freight Operators	5240503011
Industrials	Transportation	Freight & Logistics Services	Ground Freight & Logistics	Freight Trucking	5240503012
Industrials	Transportation	Freight & Logistics Services	Ground Freight & Logistics	Warehousing	5240503013
Industrials	Transportation	Freight & Logistics Services	Ground Freight & Logistics	Truck Rental	5240503014
Industrials	Transportation	Passenger Transportation Services	Airlines	Airlines (NEC)	5240601010
Industrials	Transportation	Passenger Transportation Services	Airlines	Regional Airlines	5240601011
Industrials	Transportation	Passenger Transportation Services	Airlines	Charter & Private Air Services	5240601012
Industrials	Transportation	Passenger Transportation Services	Airlines	Specialized Aviation Services	5240601013
Industrials	Transportation	Passenger Transportation Services	Airlines	Inter-Modal Passenger Transportation	5240601014
Industrials	Transportation	Passenger Transportation Services	Passenger Transportation, Ground & Sea	Passenger Transportation, Ground & Sea (NEC)	5240602010
Industrials	Transportation	Passenger Transportation Services	Passenger Transportation, Ground & Sea	Commuting Services	5240602011
Industrials	Transportation	Passenger Transportation Services	Passenger Transportation, Ground & Sea	Charter Bus Services	5240602012
Industrials	Transportation	Passenger Transportation Services	Passenger Transportation, Ground & Sea	Rail Services	5240602013
Industrials	Transportation	Passenger Transportation Services	Passenger Transportation, Ground & Sea	Marine Passenger Transportation	5240602014
Industrials	Transportation	Passenger Transportation Services	Passenger Transportation, Ground & Sea	Commuter Ferry Operators	5240602015
Industrials	Transportation	Passenger Transportation Services	Passenger Transportation, Ground & Sea	Taxis & Limousines	5240602016
Industrials	Transportation	Passenger Transportation Services	Passenger Transportation, Ground & Sea	Passenger Car Rental	5240602017
Industrials	Transportation	Transport Infrastructure	Airport Operators & Services	Airport Operators & Services (NEC)	5240701010
Industrials	Transportation	Transport Infrastructure	Airport Operators & Services	Airport Operators	5240701011
Industrials	Transportation	Transport Infrastructure	Airport Operators & Services	Duty Free Shops	5240701012
Industrials	Transportation	Transport Infrastructure	Airport Operators & Services	Airport Fueling Services	5240701013
Industrials	Transportation	Transport Infrastructure	Airport Operators & Services	Airline Catering Services	5240701014
Industrials	Transportation	Transport Infrastructure	Marine Port Services	Marine Port Services (NEC)	5240702010
Industrials	Transportation	Transport Infrastructure	Marine Port Services	Port Warehousing Services	5240702011
Industrials	Transportation	Transport Infrastructure	Marine Port Services	Port Operators	5240702012
Industrials	Transportation	Transport Infrastructure	Marine Port Services	Marine Cargo Handling Services	5240702013
Industrials	Transportation	Transport Infrastructure	Highways & Rail Tracks	Highways & Rail Tracks (NEC)	5240703010
Industrials	Transportation	Transport Infrastructure	Highways & Rail Tracks	Highway Operators	5240703011
Industrials	Transportation	Transport Infrastructure	Highways & Rail Tracks	Railway Operators	5240703012
Industrials	Transportation	Transport Infrastructure	Highways & Rail Tracks	Parking Lot Operators	5240703013
Consumer Cyclicals	Automobiles & Auto Parts	Automobiles & Auto Parts	Auto & Truck Manufacturers	Auto & Truck Manufacturers (NEC)	5310101010
Consumer Cyclicals	Automobiles & Auto Parts	Automobiles & Auto Parts	Auto & Truck Manufacturers	Motorcycles & Scooters	5310101011
Consumer Cyclicals	Automobiles & Auto Parts	Automobiles & Auto Parts	Auto & Truck Manufacturers	Automobiles & Multi Utility Vehicles	5310101012
Consumer Cyclicals	Automobiles & Auto Parts	Automobiles & Auto Parts	Auto & Truck Manufacturers	Light Trucks	5310101013
Consumer Cyclicals	Automobiles & Auto Parts	Automobiles & Auto Parts	Auto & Truck Manufacturers	Electric (Alternative) Vehicles	5310101014
Consumer Cyclicals	Automobiles & Auto Parts	Automobiles & Auto Parts	Auto & Truck Manufacturers	Luxury Vehicles	5310101015
Consumer Cyclicals	Automobiles & Auto Parts	Automobiles & Auto Parts	Auto & Truck Manufacturers	Auto & Truck Wholesale	5310101016
Consumer Cyclicals	Automobiles & Auto Parts	Automobiles & Auto Parts	Auto, Truck & Motorcycle Parts	Auto, Truck & Motorcycle Parts (NEC)	5310102010
Consumer Cyclicals	Automobiles & Auto Parts	Automobiles & Auto Parts	Auto, Truck & Motorcycle Parts	Automotive Body Parts	5310102011
Consumer Cyclicals	Automobiles & Auto Parts	Automobiles & Auto Parts	Auto, Truck & Motorcycle Parts	Engine & Powertrain Systems	5310102012
Consumer Cyclicals	Automobiles & Auto Parts	Automobiles & Auto Parts	Auto, Truck & Motorcycle Parts	Automotive Batteries	5310102013
Consumer Cyclicals	Automobiles & Auto Parts	Automobiles & Auto Parts	Auto, Truck & Motorcycle Parts	Automotive Systems	5310102014
Consumer Cyclicals	Automobiles & Auto Parts	Automobiles & Auto Parts	Auto, Truck & Motorcycle Parts	Automotive Accessories	5310102015
Consumer Cyclicals	Automobiles & Auto Parts	Automobiles & Auto Parts	Auto, Truck & Motorcycle Parts	Motorcycle Parts & Accessories	5310102016
Consumer Cyclicals	Automobiles & Auto Parts	Automobiles & Auto Parts	Auto, Truck & Motorcycle Parts	Auto & Truck Parts Wholesale	5310102017
Consumer Cyclicals	Automobiles & Auto Parts	Automobiles & Auto Parts	Tires & Rubber Products	Tires & Rubber Products (NEC)	5310103010
Consumer Cyclicals	Automobiles & Auto Parts	Automobiles & Auto Parts	Tires & Rubber Products	Tire & Tube Manufacturers	5310103011
Consumer Cyclicals	Automobiles & Auto Parts	Automobiles & Auto Parts	Tires & Rubber Products	Tire Retreading	5310103012
Consumer Cyclicals	Automobiles & Auto Parts	Automobiles & Auto Parts	Tires & Rubber Products	Industrial Rubber Products	5310103013
Consumer Cyclicals	Automobiles & Auto Parts	Automobiles & Auto Parts	Tires & Rubber Products	Rubber Plantations	5310103014
Consumer Cyclicals	Automobiles & Auto Parts	Automobiles & Auto Parts	Tires & Rubber Products	Tires & Rubber Products Wholesale	5310103015
Consumer Cyclicals	Cyclical Consumer Products	Textiles & Apparel	Textiles & Leather Goods	Textiles & Leather Goods (NEC)	5320201010
Consumer Cyclicals	Cyclical Consumer Products	Textiles & Apparel	Textiles & Leather Goods	Synthetic Fabrics	5320201011
Consumer Cyclicals	Cyclical Consumer Products	Textiles & Apparel	Textiles & Leather Goods	Natural Fabrics	5320201012
Consumer Cyclicals	Cyclical Consumer Products	Textiles & Apparel	Textiles & Leather Goods	Organic & Ecologically Produced Fabric	5320201013
Consumer Cyclicals	Cyclical Consumer Products	Textiles & Apparel	Textiles & Leather Goods	Leather Goods	5320201014
Consumer Cyclicals	Cyclical Consumer Products	Textiles & Apparel	Textiles & Leather Goods	Fur Goods	5320201015
Consumer Cyclicals	Cyclical Consumer Products	Textiles & Apparel	Textiles & Leather Goods	Fabric Dyeing & Finishing	5320201016
Consumer Cyclicals	Cyclical Consumer Products	Textiles & Apparel	Textiles & Leather Goods	Yarn Goods	5320201017
Consumer Cyclicals	Cyclical Consumer Products	Textiles & Apparel	Textiles & Leather Goods	Cotton Farming	5320201018
Consumer Cyclicals	Cyclical Consumer Products	Textiles & Apparel	Textiles & Leather Goods	Textiles & Leather Goods Wholesale	5320201019
Consumer Cyclicals	Cyclical Consumer Products	Textiles & Apparel	Apparel & Accessories	Apparel & Accessories (NEC)	5320202010
Consumer Cyclicals	Cyclical Consumer Products	Textiles & Apparel	Apparel & Accessories	Men's Clothing	5320202011
Consumer Cyclicals	Cyclical Consumer Products	Textiles & Apparel	Apparel & Accessories	Women's Clothing	5320202012
Consumer Cyclicals	Cyclical Consumer Products	Textiles & Apparel	Apparel & Accessories	Children's & Infants' Clothing	5320202013
Consumer Cyclicals	Cyclical Consumer Products	Textiles & Apparel	Apparel & Accessories	Sportswear & Outdoors Clothing	5320202014
Consumer Cyclicals	Cyclical Consumer Products	Textiles & Apparel	Apparel & Accessories	Jeans	5320202015
Consumer Cyclicals	Cyclical Consumer Products	Textiles & Apparel	Apparel & Accessories	Knitwear	5320202016
Consumer Cyclicals	Cyclical Consumer Products	Textiles & Apparel	Apparel & Accessories	Lingerie	5320202017
Consumer Cyclicals	Cyclical Consumer Products	Textiles & Apparel	Apparel & Accessories	Hosiery & Socks	5320202018
Consumer Cyclicals	Cyclical Consumer Products	Textiles & Apparel	Apparel & Accessories	Industrial Clothing & Uniforms	5320202019
Consumer Cyclicals	Cyclical Consumer Products	Textiles & Apparel	Apparel & Accessories	Fair Trade & Ethical Clothing	5320202020
Consumer Cyclicals	Cyclical Consumer Products	Textiles & Apparel	Apparel & Accessories	Luxury Clothing	5320202021
Consumer Cyclicals	Cyclical Consumer Products	Textiles & Apparel	Apparel & Accessories	Theatrical Costumes	5320202022
Consumer Cyclicals	Cyclical Consumer Products	Textiles & Apparel	Apparel & Accessories	Animal & Pet Clothing	5320202023
Consumer Cyclicals	Cyclical Consumer Products	Textiles & Apparel	Apparel & Accessories	Luxury Accessories	5320202024
Consumer Cyclicals	Cyclical Consumer Products	Textiles & Apparel	Apparel & Accessories	Accessories	5320202025
Consumer Cyclicals	Cyclical Consumer Products	Textiles & Apparel	Apparel & Accessories	Jewelry	5320202026
Consumer Cyclicals	Cyclical Consumer Products	Textiles & Apparel	Apparel & Accessories	Watches	5320202027
Consumer Cyclicals	Cyclical Consumer Products	Textiles & Apparel	Apparel & Accessories	Handbags & Luggage	5320202028
Consumer Cyclicals	Cyclical Consumer Products	Textiles & Apparel	Apparel & Accessories	Fashion Eyewear	5320202029
Consumer Cyclicals	Cyclical Consumer Products	Textiles & Apparel	Apparel & Accessories	Apparel Wholesale	5320202030
Consumer Cyclicals	Cyclical Consumer Products	Textiles & Apparel	Footwear	Footwear (NEC)	5320203010
Consumer Cyclicals	Cyclical Consumer Products	Textiles & Apparel	Footwear	Men's Footwear	5320203011
Consumer Cyclicals	Cyclical Consumer Products	Textiles & Apparel	Footwear	Women's Footwear	5320203012
Consumer Cyclicals	Cyclical Consumer Products	Textiles & Apparel	Footwear	Children's & Infants' Footwear	5320203013
Consumer Cyclicals	Cyclical Consumer Products	Textiles & Apparel	Footwear	Sports & Outdoor Footwear	5320203014
Consumer Cyclicals	Cyclical Consumer Products	Textiles & Apparel	Footwear	Luxury Footwear	5320203015
Consumer Cyclicals	Cyclical Consumer Products	Textiles & Apparel	Footwear	Functional Footwear	5320203016
Consumer Cyclicals	Cyclical Consumer Products	Textiles & Apparel	Footwear	Footwear Wholesale	5320203017
Consumer Cyclicals	Cyclical Consumer Products	Homebuilding & Construction Supplies	Homebuilding	Homebuilding (NEC)	5320301010
Consumer Cyclicals	Cyclical Consumer Products	Homebuilding & Construction Supplies	Homebuilding	Residential Builders - Single Homes	5320301011
Consumer Cyclicals	Cyclical Consumer Products	Homebuilding & Construction Supplies	Homebuilding	Residential Builders - Multifamily Homes	5320301012
Consumer Cyclicals	Cyclical Consumer Products	Homebuilding & Construction Supplies	Homebuilding	Prefabricated Homes	5320301013
Consumer Cyclicals	Cyclical Consumer Products	Homebuilding & Construction Supplies	Homebuilding	Sustainable & Energy Efficient Home Builders	5320301014
Consumer Cyclicals	Cyclical Consumer Products	Homebuilding & Construction Supplies	Homebuilding	Retirement Home Builders	5320301015
Consumer Cyclicals	Cyclical Consumer Products	Homebuilding & Construction Supplies	Homebuilding	Residential Architectural & Interior Design Services	5320301016
Consumer Cyclicals	Cyclical Consumer Products	Homebuilding & Construction Supplies	Construction Supplies & Fixtures	Construction Supplies & Fixtures (NEC)	5320302010
Consumer Cyclicals	Cyclical Consumer Products	Homebuilding & Construction Supplies	Construction Supplies & Fixtures	Construction Supplies	5320302011
Consumer Cyclicals	Cyclical Consumer Products	Homebuilding & Construction Supplies	Construction Supplies & Fixtures	Luxury Construction Supplies & Fixtures	5320302012
Consumer Cyclicals	Cyclical Consumer Products	Homebuilding & Construction Supplies	Construction Supplies & Fixtures	Doors & Window Frames	5320302013
Consumer Cyclicals	Cyclical Consumer Products	Homebuilding & Construction Supplies	Construction Supplies & Fixtures	Flooring & Interior Tile Manufacturers	5320302014
Consumer Cyclicals	Cyclical Consumer Products	Homebuilding & Construction Supplies	Construction Supplies & Fixtures	Plumbing Fixtures & Fittings	5320302015
Consumer Cyclicals	Cyclical Consumer Products	Homebuilding & Construction Supplies	Construction Supplies & Fixtures	Kitchen Cabinets	5320302016
Consumer Cyclicals	Cyclical Consumer Products	Homebuilding & Construction Supplies	Construction Supplies & Fixtures	Bathroom Fixtures	5320302017
Consumer Cyclicals	Cyclical Consumer Products	Homebuilding & Construction Supplies	Construction Supplies & Fixtures	Roofing Supplies	5320302018
Consumer Cyclicals	Cyclical Consumer Products	Homebuilding & Construction Supplies	Construction Supplies & Fixtures	Lighting Fixtures	5320302019
Consumer Cyclicals	Cyclical Consumer Products	Homebuilding & Construction Supplies	Construction Supplies & Fixtures	Construction Supplies & Fixtures Wholesale	5320302020
Consumer Cyclicals	Cyclical Consumer Products	Household Goods	Appliances, Tools & Housewares	Appliances, Tools & Housewares (NEC)	5320403010
Consumer Cyclicals	Cyclical Consumer Products	Household Goods	Appliances, Tools & Housewares	Household Appliances	5320403011
Consumer Cyclicals	Cyclical Consumer Products	Household Goods	Appliances, Tools & Housewares	Tools & Housewares	5320403012
Consumer Cyclicals	Cyclical Consumer Products	Household Goods	Appliances, Tools & Housewares	Kitchen Appliances	5320403013
Consumer Cyclicals	Cyclical Consumer Products	Household Goods	Appliances, Tools & Housewares	Cutlery & Flatware	5320403014
Consumer Cyclicals	Cyclical Consumer Products	Household Goods	Appliances, Tools & Housewares	Appliance & Houseware Wholesale	5320403015
Consumer Cyclicals	Cyclical Consumer Products	Household Goods	Appliances, Tools & Housewares	Luxury Appliances	5320403016
Consumer Cyclicals	Cyclical Consumer Products	Household Goods	Home Furnishings	Home Furnishings (NEC)	5320404010
Consumer Cyclicals	Cyclical Consumer Products	Household Goods	Home Furnishings	Carpets & Curtains	5320404011
Consumer Cyclicals	Cyclical Consumer Products	Household Goods	Home Furnishings	Wallpaper	5320404012
Consumer Cyclicals	Cyclical Consumer Products	Household Goods	Home Furnishings	Luxury Furnishing	5320404014
Consumer Cyclicals	Cyclical Consumer Products	Household Goods	Home Furnishings	Antiques	5320404015
Consumer Cyclicals	Cyclical Consumer Products	Household Goods	Home Furnishings	Home Furnishings Wholesale	5320404016
Consumer Cyclicals	Cyclical Consumer Products	Household Goods	Home Furnishings	Furniture	5320404017
Consumer Cyclicals	Cyclical Consumer Products	Household Goods	Home Furnishings	Art & Craftwork	5320404018
Consumer Cyclicals	Cyclical Consumer Products	Leisure Products	Toys & Children's Products	Toys & Children's Products (NEC)	5320501010
Consumer Cyclicals	Cyclical Consumer Products	Leisure Products	Toys & Children's Products	Dolls & Stuffed Toys	5320501011
Consumer Cyclicals	Cyclical Consumer Products	Leisure Products	Toys & Children's Products	Games, Toys & Children's Vehicles	5320501012
Consumer Cyclicals	Cyclical Consumer Products	Leisure Products	Toys & Children's Products	Children's Safety Products	5320501013
Consumer Cyclicals	Cyclical Consumer Products	Leisure Products	Toys & Children's Products	Children's Furniture	5320501014
Consumer Cyclicals	Cyclical Consumer Products	Leisure Products	Toys & Children's Products	Children's Products & Accessories	5320501015
Consumer Cyclicals	Cyclical Consumer Products	Leisure Products	Toys & Children's Products	Toys & Children's Products Wholesale	5320501016
Consumer Cyclicals	Cyclical Consumer Products	Leisure Products	Recreational Products	Recreational Products (NEC)	5320502010
Consumer Cyclicals	Cyclical Consumer Products	Leisure Products	Recreational Products	Sailing Yachts & Motorboats	5320502011
Consumer Cyclicals	Cyclical Consumer Products	Leisure Products	Recreational Products	Bicycle Manufacturing	5320502012
Consumer Cyclicals	Cyclical Consumer Products	Leisure Products	Recreational Products	Sporting & Outdoor Goods	5320502013
Consumer Cyclicals	Cyclical Consumer Products	Leisure Products	Recreational Products	Musical Instruments	5320502014
Consumer Cyclicals	Cyclical Consumer Products	Leisure Products	Recreational Products	Luxury Recreational Products	5320502015
Consumer Cyclicals	Cyclical Consumer Products	Leisure Products	Recreational Products	Leisure Products Wholesale	5320502016
Consumer Cyclicals	Cyclical Consumer Products	Leisure Products	Recreational Products	Electric Scooters & Bicycles	5320502017
Consumer Cyclicals	Cyclical Consumer Services	Hotels & Entertainment Services	Hotels, Motels & Cruise Lines	Hotels, Motels & Cruise Lines (NEC)	5330101010
Consumer Cyclicals	Cyclical Consumer Services	Hotels & Entertainment Services	Hotels, Motels & Cruise Lines	Hotels & Motels	5330101011
Consumer Cyclicals	Cyclical Consumer Services	Hotels & Entertainment Services	Hotels, Motels & Cruise Lines	Cruise Lines	5330101012
Consumer Cyclicals	Cyclical Consumer Services	Hotels & Entertainment Services	Hotels, Motels & Cruise Lines	Luxury Hotels	5330101013
Consumer Cyclicals	Cyclical Consumer Services	Hotels & Entertainment Services	Hotels, Motels & Cruise Lines	Resort Operators	5330101014
Consumer Cyclicals	Cyclical Consumer Services	Hotels & Entertainment Services	Hotels, Motels & Cruise Lines	Bed & Breakfast	5330101015
Consumer Cyclicals	Cyclical Consumer Services	Hotels & Entertainment Services	Hotels, Motels & Cruise Lines	Self-Catering Accommodation	5330101016
Consumer Cyclicals	Cyclical Consumer Services	Hotels & Entertainment Services	Hotels, Motels & Cruise Lines	Campsite Operators	5330101017
Consumer Cyclicals	Cyclical Consumer Services	Hotels & Entertainment Services	Restaurants & Bars	Restaurants & Bars (NEC)	5330102010
Consumer Cyclicals	Cyclical Consumer Services	Hotels & Entertainment Services	Restaurants & Bars	Pubs, Bars & Night Clubs	5330102011
Consumer Cyclicals	Cyclical Consumer Services	Hotels & Entertainment Services	Restaurants & Bars	Commercial Food Services	5330102012
Consumer Cyclicals	Cyclical Consumer Services	Hotels & Entertainment Services	Restaurants & Bars	Quick Service Restaurants	5330102013
Consumer Cyclicals	Cyclical Consumer Services	Hotels & Entertainment Services	Restaurants & Bars	Mobile Caterers	5330102014
Consumer Cyclicals	Cyclical Consumer Services	Hotels & Entertainment Services	Restaurants & Bars	Banquet Halls & Catering	5330102015
Consumer Cyclicals	Cyclical Consumer Services	Hotels & Entertainment Services	Restaurants & Bars	Cafés	5330102016
Consumer Cyclicals	Cyclical Consumer Services	Hotels & Entertainment Services	Casinos & Gaming	Casinos & Gaming (NEC)	5330103010
Consumer Cyclicals	Cyclical Consumer Services	Hotels & Entertainment Services	Casinos & Gaming	Gambling & Gaming Machine Manufacturers	5330103011
Consumer Cyclicals	Cyclical Consumer Services	Hotels & Entertainment Services	Casinos & Gaming	Gaming Machine Operators	5330103012
Consumer Cyclicals	Cyclical Consumer Services	Hotels & Entertainment Services	Casinos & Gaming	Casinos	5330103013
Consumer Cyclicals	Cyclical Consumer Services	Hotels & Entertainment Services	Casinos & Gaming	Horse & Dog Race Tracks	5330103014
Consumer Cyclicals	Cyclical Consumer Services	Hotels & Entertainment Services	Casinos & Gaming	Lottery Operators	5330103015
Consumer Cyclicals	Cyclical Consumer Services	Hotels & Entertainment Services	Leisure & Recreation	Leisure & Recreation (NEC)	5330104010
Consumer Cyclicals	Cyclical Consumer Services	Hotels & Entertainment Services	Leisure & Recreation	Movie Theaters & Movie Products	5330104011
Consumer Cyclicals	Cyclical Consumer Services	Hotels & Entertainment Services	Leisure & Recreation	Theatres & Performing Arts	5330104012
Consumer Cyclicals	Cyclical Consumer Services	Hotels & Entertainment Services	Leisure & Recreation	Museums & Historic Places	5330104013
Consumer Cyclicals	Cyclical Consumer Services	Hotels & Entertainment Services	Leisure & Recreation	Travel Agents	5330104014
Consumer Cyclicals	Cyclical Consumer Services	Hotels & Entertainment Services	Leisure & Recreation	Amusement Parks and Zoos	5330104015
Consumer Cyclicals	Cyclical Consumer Services	Hotels & Entertainment Services	Leisure & Recreation	Gyms, Fitness and Spa Centers	5330104016
Consumer Cyclicals	Cyclical Consumer Services	Hotels & Entertainment Services	Leisure & Recreation	Adventure Sports Facilities & Ski Resorts	5330104017
Consumer Cyclicals	Cyclical Consumer Services	Hotels & Entertainment Services	Leisure & Recreation	Public Sport Facilities	5330104018
Consumer Cyclicals	Cyclical Consumer Services	Hotels & Entertainment Services	Leisure & Recreation	Professional Sports Venues	5330104019
Consumer Cyclicals	Cyclical Consumer Services	Hotels & Entertainment Services	Leisure & Recreation	Golf Courses	5330104020
Consumer Cyclicals	Cyclical Consumer Services	Hotels & Entertainment Services	Leisure & Recreation	Hunting & Fishing	5330104021
Consumer Cyclicals	Cyclical Consumer Services	Hotels & Entertainment Services	Leisure & Recreation	Marinas	5330104022
Consumer Cyclicals	Cyclical Consumer Services	Hotels & Entertainment Services	Leisure & Recreation	Guided Tour Operators	5330104023
Consumer Cyclicals	Cyclical Consumer Services	Media & Publishing	Advertising & Marketing	Advertising & Marketing (NEC)	5330201010
Consumer Cyclicals	Cyclical Consumer Services	Media & Publishing	Advertising & Marketing	Advertising Agency	5330201011
Consumer Cyclicals	Cyclical Consumer Services	Media & Publishing	Advertising & Marketing	Media Buying Agency	5330201012
Consumer Cyclicals	Cyclical Consumer Services	Media & Publishing	Advertising & Marketing	Signs & Advertising Specialty Producers	5330201013
Consumer Cyclicals	Cyclical Consumer Services	Media & Publishing	Advertising & Marketing	Outdoor Advertising	5330201014
Consumer Cyclicals	Cyclical Consumer Services	Media & Publishing	Advertising & Marketing	Direct Marketing	5330201015
Consumer Cyclicals	Cyclical Consumer Services	Media & Publishing	Advertising & Marketing	Sales Promotions & Events Management	5330201016
Consumer Cyclicals	Cyclical Consumer Services	Media & Publishing	Advertising & Marketing	Guerrilla & Sensory Marketing	5330201017
Consumer Cyclicals	Cyclical Consumer Services	Media & Publishing	Advertising & Marketing	Public Relations	5330201018
Consumer Cyclicals	Cyclical Consumer Services	Media & Publishing	Advertising & Marketing	Digital Media Agencies	5330201019
Consumer Cyclicals	Cyclical Consumer Services	Media & Publishing	Advertising & Marketing	Branding & Naming	5330201020
Consumer Cyclicals	Cyclical Consumer Services	Media & Publishing	Advertising & Marketing	Market Research	5330201021
Consumer Cyclicals	Cyclical Consumer Services	Media & Publishing	Advertising & Marketing	Marketing Consulting Services	5330201022
Consumer Cyclicals	Cyclical Consumer Services	Media & Publishing	Broadcasting	Broadcasting (NEC)	5330202010
Consumer Cyclicals	Cyclical Consumer Services	Media & Publishing	Broadcasting	Television Broadcasting	5330202011
Consumer Cyclicals	Cyclical Consumer Services	Media & Publishing	Broadcasting	Radio Broadcasting	5330202012
Consumer Cyclicals	Cyclical Consumer Services	Media & Publishing	Broadcasting	Cable Service Providers	5330202013
Consumer Cyclicals	Cyclical Consumer Services	Media & Publishing	Entertainment Production	Entertainment Production (NEC)	5330203010
Consumer Cyclicals	Cyclical Consumer Services	Media & Publishing	Entertainment Production	Movie, TV Production & Distribution	5330203011
Consumer Cyclicals	Cyclical Consumer Services	Media & Publishing	Entertainment Production	Music, Music Video Production & Distribution	5330203012
Consumer Cyclicals	Cyclical Consumer Services	Media & Publishing	Entertainment Production	Plays & Concert Production	5330203013
Consumer Cyclicals	Cyclical Consumer Services	Media & Publishing	Entertainment Production	Entertainment Production Equipment & Services	5330203014
Consumer Cyclicals	Cyclical Consumer Services	Media & Publishing	Entertainment Production	Copyright Management	5330203015
Consumer Cyclicals	Cyclical Consumer Services	Media & Publishing	Entertainment Production	Adult Entertainment Production & Broadcasting	5330203016
Consumer Cyclicals	Cyclical Consumer Services	Media & Publishing	Consumer Publishing	Consumer Publishing (NEC)	5330204010
Consumer Cyclicals	Cyclical Consumer Services	Media & Publishing	Consumer Publishing	Newspaper Publishing	5330204011
Consumer Cyclicals	Cyclical Consumer Services	Media & Publishing	Consumer Publishing	Magazine Publishing	5330204012
Consumer Cyclicals	Cyclical Consumer Services	Media & Publishing	Consumer Publishing	Book Publishing	5330204013
Consumer Cyclicals	Cyclical Consumer Services	Media & Publishing	Consumer Publishing	Directory Publishing	5330204014
Consumer Cyclicals	Cyclical Consumer Services	Media & Publishing	Consumer Publishing	Digital Publishing	5330204015
Consumer Cyclicals	Cyclical Consumer Services	Media & Publishing	Consumer Publishing	Adult Publishing	5330204016
Consumer Cyclicals	Cyclical Consumer Services	Media & Publishing	Consumer Publishing	Books, Newspapers & Magazines Wholesale	5330204017
Consumer Cyclicals	Retailers	Diversified Retail	Department Stores	Department Stores (NEC)	5340201010
Consumer Cyclicals	Retailers	Diversified Retail	Department Stores	General Department Stores	5340201011
Consumer Cyclicals	Retailers	Diversified Retail	Department Stores	Luxury Department Stores	5340201012
Consumer Cyclicals	Retailers	Diversified Retail	Department Stores	Internet & Mail Order Department Stores	5340201013
Consumer Cyclicals	Retailers	Diversified Retail	Discount Stores	Discount Stores (NEC)	5340202010
Consumer Cyclicals	Retailers	Diversified Retail	Discount Stores	Internet & Mail Order Discount Stores	5340202011
Consumer Cyclicals	Retailers	Diversified Retail	Discount Stores	Discount Stores with Grocery	5340202012
Consumer Cyclicals	Retailers	Diversified Retail	Discount Stores	Discount Stores without Grocery	5340202013
Consumer Cyclicals	Retailers	Diversified Retail	Discount Stores	Discount Stores with Gasoline	5340202014
Consumer Cyclicals	Retailers	Diversified Retail	Discount Stores	Discount Stores without Gasoline	5340202015
Consumer Cyclicals	Retailers	Specialty Retailers	Auto Vehicles, Parts & Service Retailers	Auto Vehicles, Parts & Service Retailers (NEC)	5340301010
Consumer Cyclicals	Retailers	Specialty Retailers	Auto Vehicles, Parts & Service Retailers	New Car Dealers	5340301011
Consumer Cyclicals	Retailers	Specialty Retailers	Auto Vehicles, Parts & Service Retailers	Used Car Dealers	5340301012
Consumer Cyclicals	Retailers	Specialty Retailers	Auto Vehicles, Parts & Service Retailers	Motorcycle Dealers	5340301013
Consumer Cyclicals	Retailers	Specialty Retailers	Auto Vehicles, Parts & Service Retailers	Automotive Parts & Accessories Retailers	5340301014
Consumer Cyclicals	Retailers	Specialty Retailers	Auto Vehicles, Parts & Service Retailers	Tire Dealers	5340301015
Consumer Cyclicals	Retailers	Specialty Retailers	Auto Vehicles, Parts & Service Retailers	Luxury Car Dealers	5340301016
Consumer Cyclicals	Retailers	Specialty Retailers	Home Improvement Products & Services Retailers	Home Improvement Products & Services Retailers (NEC)	5340302010
Consumer Cyclicals	Retailers	Specialty Retailers	Home Improvement Products & Services Retailers	Paint & Wallpaper Retailers	5340302011
Consumer Cyclicals	Retailers	Specialty Retailers	Home Improvement Products & Services Retailers	Builder Merchants	5340302012
Consumer Cyclicals	Retailers	Specialty Retailers	Home Improvement Products & Services Retailers	Nursery & Garden Centers	5340302013
Consumer Cyclicals	Retailers	Specialty Retailers	Home Improvement Products & Services Retailers	Kitchen & Bathroom Retailers	5340302014
Consumer Cyclicals	Retailers	Specialty Retailers	Home Improvement Products & Services Retailers	Home Décor Retailers	5340302015
Consumer Cyclicals	Retailers	Specialty Retailers	Home Improvement Products & Services Retailers	Interior Design Services	5340302016
Consumer Cyclicals	Retailers	Specialty Retailers	Home Improvement Products & Services Retailers	Luxury Home Improvement Product Retailers	5340302017
Consumer Cyclicals	Retailers	Specialty Retailers	Home Furnishings Retailers	Home Furnishings Retailers (NEC)	5340303010
Consumer Cyclicals	Retailers	Specialty Retailers	Home Furnishings Retailers	Furniture Retailers	5340303011
Consumer Cyclicals	Retailers	Specialty Retailers	Home Furnishings Retailers	Floor Covering Retailers	5340303012
Consumer Cyclicals	Retailers	Specialty Retailers	Home Furnishings Retailers	Soft Furnishing Retailers	5340303013
Consumer Cyclicals	Retailers	Specialty Retailers	Home Furnishings Retailers	Luxury Furnishing Retailers	5340303014
Consumer Cyclicals	Retailers	Specialty Retailers	Home Furnishings Retailers	Antique Dealers	5340303015
Consumer Cyclicals	Retailers	Specialty Retailers	Home Furnishings Retailers	Art & Craftwork Retailers	5340303016
Consumer Cyclicals	Retailers	Specialty Retailers	Apparel & Accessories Retailers	Apparel & Accessories Retailers (NEC)	5340304010
Consumer Cyclicals	Retailers	Specialty Retailers	Apparel & Accessories Retailers	Footwear Retailers	5340304011
Consumer Cyclicals	Retailers	Specialty Retailers	Apparel & Accessories Retailers	Jewelry & Watch Retailers	5340304012
Consumer Cyclicals	Retailers	Specialty Retailers	Apparel & Accessories Retailers	Men's Apparel Retailers	5340304013
Consumer Cyclicals	Retailers	Specialty Retailers	Apparel & Accessories Retailers	Women's Apparel Retailers	5340304014
Consumer Cyclicals	Retailers	Specialty Retailers	Apparel & Accessories Retailers	Children's & Infants' Clothing Retailers	5340304015
Consumer Cyclicals	Retailers	Specialty Retailers	Apparel & Accessories Retailers	Teen Fashion Retailers	5340304016
Consumer Cyclicals	Retailers	Specialty Retailers	Apparel & Accessories Retailers	Handbags & Luggage Retailers	5340304017
Consumer Cyclicals	Retailers	Specialty Retailers	Apparel & Accessories Retailers	Luxury Apparel Retailers	5340304018
Consumer Cyclicals	Retailers	Specialty Retailers	Apparel & Accessories Retailers	Sports & Outdoors Retailers	5340304019
Consumer Cyclicals	Retailers	Specialty Retailers	Computer & Electronics Retailers	Computer & Electronics Retailers (NEC)	5340305010
Consumer Cyclicals	Retailers	Specialty Retailers	Computer & Electronics Retailers	Computer Hardware & Software Retailers	5340305011
Consumer Cyclicals	Retailers	Specialty Retailers	Computer & Electronics Retailers	Consumer Electronics Retailers	5340305012
Consumer Cyclicals	Retailers	Specialty Retailers	Computer & Electronics Retailers	Mobile Phone Retailers	5340305013
Consumer Cyclicals	Retailers	Specialty Retailers	Miscellaneous Specialty Retailers	Miscellaneous Specialty Retailers (NEC)	5340309010
Consumer Cyclicals	Retailers	Specialty Retailers	Miscellaneous Specialty Retailers	Luxury Beauty Supply Retailers	5340309011
Consumer Cyclicals	Retailers	Specialty Retailers	Miscellaneous Specialty Retailers	Personal Care Products Retailers	5340309012
Consumer Cyclicals	Retailers	Specialty Retailers	Miscellaneous Specialty Retailers	Optical Goods Stores	5340309013
Consumer Cyclicals	Retailers	Specialty Retailers	Miscellaneous Specialty Retailers	Health Food Stores	5340309014
Consumer Cyclicals	Retailers	Specialty Retailers	Miscellaneous Specialty Retailers	Musical Instrument Retailers	5340309015
Consumer Cyclicals	Retailers	Specialty Retailers	Miscellaneous Specialty Retailers	Hobby & Craft Product Retailers	5340309016
Consumer Cyclicals	Retailers	Specialty Retailers	Miscellaneous Specialty Retailers	Toys & Games Retailers	5340309017
Consumer Cyclicals	Retailers	Specialty Retailers	Miscellaneous Specialty Retailers	Book & Magazine Retailers	5340309018
Consumer Cyclicals	Retailers	Specialty Retailers	Miscellaneous Specialty Retailers	Florists	5340309019
Consumer Cyclicals	Retailers	Specialty Retailers	Miscellaneous Specialty Retailers	Office Supplies & Stationery Stores	5340309020
Consumer Cyclicals	Retailers	Specialty Retailers	Miscellaneous Specialty Retailers	Gift, Novelty & Souvenir Stores	5340309021
Consumer Cyclicals	Retailers	Specialty Retailers	Miscellaneous Specialty Retailers	Used Merchandise Stores	5340309022
Consumer Cyclicals	Retailers	Specialty Retailers	Miscellaneous Specialty Retailers	Sporting Goods Stores	5340309023
Consumer Cyclicals	Retailers	Specialty Retailers	Miscellaneous Specialty Retailers	Pet & Pet Supplies Retailers	5340309024
Consumer Cyclicals	Retailers	Specialty Retailers	Miscellaneous Specialty Retailers	Adult Products Retailers	5340309025
Consumer Non-Cyclicals	Food & Beverages	Beverages	Brewers	Brewers (NEC)	5410101010
Consumer Non-Cyclicals	Food & Beverages	Beverages	Brewers	Craft & Micro Brewers	5410101011
Consumer Non-Cyclicals	Food & Beverages	Beverages	Distillers & Wineries	Distillers & Wineries (NEC)	5410102010
Consumer Non-Cyclicals	Food & Beverages	Beverages	Distillers & Wineries	Wineries	5410102011
Consumer Non-Cyclicals	Food & Beverages	Beverages	Distillers & Wineries	Distilleries	5410102012
Consumer Non-Cyclicals	Food & Beverages	Beverages	Distillers & Wineries	Malt Producers	5410102013
Consumer Non-Cyclicals	Food & Beverages	Beverages	Non-Alcoholic Beverages	Non-Alcoholic Beverages (NEC)	5410103010
Consumer Non-Cyclicals	Food & Beverages	Beverages	Non-Alcoholic Beverages	Carbonated Soft Drinks	5410103011
Consumer Non-Cyclicals	Food & Beverages	Beverages	Non-Alcoholic Beverages	Fruit Drinks	5410103012
Consumer Non-Cyclicals	Food & Beverages	Beverages	Non-Alcoholic Beverages	Energy Drinks	5410103013
Consumer Non-Cyclicals	Food & Beverages	Beverages	Non-Alcoholic Beverages	Bottled Water & Ice	5410103014
Consumer Non-Cyclicals	Food & Beverages	Food & Tobacco	Fishing & Farming	Fishing & Farming (NEC)	5410201010
Consumer Non-Cyclicals	Food & Beverages	Food & Tobacco	Fishing & Farming	Grain (Crop) Production	5410201011
Consumer Non-Cyclicals	Food & Beverages	Food & Tobacco	Fishing & Farming	Poultry Farming	5410201012
Consumer Non-Cyclicals	Food & Beverages	Food & Tobacco	Fishing & Farming	Sheep & Specialty Livestock Farming	5410201013
Consumer Non-Cyclicals	Food & Beverages	Food & Tobacco	Fishing & Farming	Vegetable, Fruit & Nut Farming	5410201014
Consumer Non-Cyclicals	Food & Beverages	Food & Tobacco	Fishing & Farming	Coffee, Tea & Cocoa Farming	5410201015
Consumer Non-Cyclicals	Food & Beverages	Food & Tobacco	Fishing & Farming	Sugarcane Farming	5410201016
Consumer Non-Cyclicals	Food & Beverages	Food & Tobacco	Fishing & Farming	Commercial Nurseries	5410201017
Consumer Non-Cyclicals	Food & Beverages	Food & Tobacco	Fishing & Farming	Commercial Fishing	5410201018
Consumer Non-Cyclicals	Food & Beverages	Food & Tobacco	Fishing & Farming	Aquaculture	5410201019
Consumer Non-Cyclicals	Food & Beverages	Food & Tobacco	Fishing & Farming	Fur Farming	5410201020
Consumer Non-Cyclicals	Food & Beverages	Food & Tobacco	Fishing & Farming	Animal Breeding	5410201021
Consumer Non-Cyclicals	Food & Beverages	Food & Tobacco	Fishing & Farming	Agriculture Support Services	5410201022
Consumer Non-Cyclicals	Food & Beverages	Food & Tobacco	Fishing & Farming	Organic Farming	5410201023
Consumer Non-Cyclicals	Food & Beverages	Food & Tobacco	Fishing & Farming	Animal Feed	5410201024
Consumer Non-Cyclicals	Food & Beverages	Food & Tobacco	Fishing & Farming	Agricultural Consultancy Services	5410201025
Consumer Non-Cyclicals	Food & Beverages	Food & Tobacco	Fishing & Farming	Fishing & Farming Wholesale	5410201026
Consumer Non-Cyclicals	Food & Beverages	Food & Tobacco	Fishing & Farming	Agricultural Biotechnology	5410201027
Consumer Non-Cyclicals	Food & Beverages	Food & Tobacco	Fishing & Farming	Hog & Pig Farming	5410201028
Consumer Non-Cyclicals	Food & Beverages	Food & Tobacco	Fishing & Farming	Cattle Farming	5410201029
Consumer Non-Cyclicals	Food & Beverages	Food & Tobacco	Fishing & Farming	Fair Trade & Ethical Fishing & Farming	5410201030
Consumer Non-Cyclicals	Food & Beverages	Food & Tobacco	Food Processing	Food Processing (NEC)	5410202010
Consumer Non-Cyclicals	Food & Beverages	Food & Tobacco	Food Processing	Flour Milling	5410202011
Consumer Non-Cyclicals	Food & Beverages	Food & Tobacco	Food Processing	Bread & Bakery Product Manufacturing	5410202012
Consumer Non-Cyclicals	Food & Beverages	Food & Tobacco	Food Processing	Breakfast Cereal Manufacturing	5410202013
Consumer Non-Cyclicals	Food & Beverages	Food & Tobacco	Food Processing	Cookie, Cracker & Pasta Manufacturing	5410202014
Consumer Non-Cyclicals	Food & Beverages	Food & Tobacco	Food Processing	Fruit & Vegetable Processing	5410202015
Consumer Non-Cyclicals	Food & Beverages	Food & Tobacco	Food Processing	Meat Processing	5410202016
Consumer Non-Cyclicals	Food & Beverages	Food & Tobacco	Food Processing	Halal Meat Processing	5410202017
Consumer Non-Cyclicals	Food & Beverages	Food & Tobacco	Food Processing	Seafood Product Preparation & Packaging	5410202018
Consumer Non-Cyclicals	Food & Beverages	Food & Tobacco	Food Processing	Dairy Products	5410202019
Consumer Non-Cyclicals	Food & Beverages	Food & Tobacco	Food Processing	Starch, Vegetable Fat & Oil Manufacturing	5410202020
Consumer Non-Cyclicals	Food & Beverages	Food & Tobacco	Food Processing	Coffee & Tea	5410202021
Consumer Non-Cyclicals	Food & Beverages	Food & Tobacco	Food Processing	Sugar & Artificial Sweeteners	5410202022
Consumer Non-Cyclicals	Food & Beverages	Food & Tobacco	Food Processing	Chocolate & Confectionery	5410202023
Consumer Non-Cyclicals	Food & Beverages	Food & Tobacco	Food Processing	Snack Food & Non-Chocolate Confectionary	5410202024
Consumer Non-Cyclicals	Food & Beverages	Food & Tobacco	Food Processing	Special Foods & Wellbeing Products	5410202025
Consumer Non-Cyclicals	Food & Beverages	Food & Tobacco	Food Processing	Food Ingredients	5410202026
Consumer Non-Cyclicals	Food & Beverages	Food & Tobacco	Food Processing	Baby Food	5410202027
Consumer Non-Cyclicals	Food & Beverages	Food & Tobacco	Food Processing	Ready-Made Meals	5410202028
Consumer Non-Cyclicals	Food & Beverages	Food & Tobacco	Food Processing	Frozen Food Manufacturing	5410202030
Consumer Non-Cyclicals	Food & Beverages	Food & Tobacco	Food Processing	Pet Food Manufacturing	5410202031
Consumer Non-Cyclicals	Food & Beverages	Food & Tobacco	Food Processing	Vegan & Vegetarian Food Manufacturing	5410202032
Consumer Non-Cyclicals	Food & Beverages	Food & Tobacco	Tobacco	Tobacco (NEC)	5410203010
Consumer Non-Cyclicals	Food & Beverages	Food & Tobacco	Tobacco	Tobacco Farming	5410203011
Consumer Non-Cyclicals	Food & Beverages	Food & Tobacco	Tobacco	Tobacco Stemming & Redrying	5410203012
Consumer Non-Cyclicals	Food & Beverages	Food & Tobacco	Tobacco	Cigars & Cigarette Manufacturing	5410203013
Consumer Non-Cyclicals	Food & Beverages	Food & Tobacco	Tobacco	Chewing Tobacco Products	5410203014
Consumer Non-Cyclicals	Personal & Household Products & Services	Personal & Household Products & Services	Household Products	Household Products (NEC)	5420101010
Consumer Non-Cyclicals	Personal & Household Products & Services	Personal & Household Products & Services	Household Products	Laundry Supplies	5420101011
Consumer Non-Cyclicals	Personal & Household Products & Services	Personal & Household Products & Services	Household Products	Cleaning Supplies	5420101012
Consumer Non-Cyclicals	Personal & Household Products & Services	Personal & Household Products & Services	Household Products	Air Fresheners	5420101013
Consumer Non-Cyclicals	Personal & Household Products & Services	Personal & Household Products & Services	Household Products	Pet & Plant Protection Agents	5420101015
Consumer Non-Cyclicals	Personal & Household Products & Services	Personal & Household Products & Services	Household Products	Auto Cleaning Products	5420101016
Consumer Non-Cyclicals	Personal & Household Products & Services	Personal & Household Products & Services	Personal Products	Personal Products (NEC)	5420102010
Consumer Non-Cyclicals	Personal & Household Products & Services	Personal & Household Products & Services	Personal Products	Cosmetics & Perfumes	5420102011
Consumer Non-Cyclicals	Personal & Household Products & Services	Personal & Household Products & Services	Personal Products	Luxury Cosmetics	5420102012
Consumer Non-Cyclicals	Personal & Household Products & Services	Personal & Household Products & Services	Personal Products	Sanitary Products	5420102013
Consumer Non-Cyclicals	Personal & Household Products & Services	Personal & Household Products & Services	Personal Products	Hair Accessories	5420102014
Consumer Non-Cyclicals	Personal & Household Products & Services	Personal & Household Products & Services	Personal Products	Birth Control Products	5420102015
Consumer Non-Cyclicals	Personal & Household Products & Services	Personal & Household Products & Services	Personal Products	Halal Personal Products	5420102016
Consumer Non-Cyclicals	Personal & Household Products & Services	Personal & Household Products & Services	Personal Services	Personal Services (NEC)	5420103010
Consumer Non-Cyclicals	Personal & Household Products & Services	Personal & Household Products & Services	Personal Services	Consumer Goods Rental	5420103011
Consumer Non-Cyclicals	Personal & Household Products & Services	Personal & Household Products & Services	Personal Services	Accounting & Tax Preparation	5420103012
Consumer Non-Cyclicals	Personal & Household Products & Services	Personal & Household Products & Services	Personal Services	Personal Legal Services	5420103013
Consumer Non-Cyclicals	Personal & Household Products & Services	Personal & Household Products & Services	Personal Services	Child Care & Family Services	5420103015
Consumer Non-Cyclicals	Personal & Household Products & Services	Personal & Household Products & Services	Personal Services	Consumer Repair Services	5420103016
Consumer Non-Cyclicals	Personal & Household Products & Services	Personal & Household Products & Services	Personal Services	Personal Care Services	5420103017
Consumer Non-Cyclicals	Personal & Household Products & Services	Personal & Household Products & Services	Personal Services	Funeral Services	5420103018
Consumer Non-Cyclicals	Food & Drug Retailing	Food & Drug Retailing	Drug Retailers	Drug Retailers (NEC)	5430101010
Consumer Non-Cyclicals	Food & Drug Retailing	Food & Drug Retailing	Drug Retailers	Retail - Drugs with Grocery	5430101011
Consumer Non-Cyclicals	Food & Drug Retailing	Food & Drug Retailing	Drug Retailers	Retail - Drugs without Grocery	5430101012
Consumer Non-Cyclicals	Food & Drug Retailing	Food & Drug Retailing	Drug Retailers	Cannabis Product Retailers	5430101013
Consumer Non-Cyclicals	Food & Drug Retailing	Food & Drug Retailing	Drug Retailers	Non-Cannabis Recreational Drug Retailers	5430101014
Consumer Non-Cyclicals	Food & Drug Retailing	Food & Drug Retailing	Food Retail & Distribution	Food Retail & Distribution (NEC)	5430102010
Consumer Non-Cyclicals	Food & Drug Retailing	Food & Drug Retailing	Food Retail & Distribution	Food Wholesale	5430102011
Consumer Non-Cyclicals	Food & Drug Retailing	Food & Drug Retailing	Food Retail & Distribution	Supermarkets & Convenience Stores	5430102012
Consumer Non-Cyclicals	Food & Drug Retailing	Food & Drug Retailing	Food Retail & Distribution	Beer, Wine & Liquor Stores	5430102013
Consumer Non-Cyclicals	Food & Drug Retailing	Food & Drug Retailing	Food Retail & Distribution	Vending Machine Providers	5430102014
Consumer Non-Cyclicals	Food & Drug Retailing	Food & Drug Retailing	Food Retail & Distribution	Tobacco Stores	5430102015
Consumer Non-Cyclicals	Food & Drug Retailing	Food & Drug Retailing	Food Retail & Distribution	Food Markets	5430102016
Consumer Non-Cyclicals	Consumer Goods Conglomerates	Consumer Goods Conglomerates	Consumer Goods Conglomerates	Consumer Goods Conglomerates	5440101010
Financials	Banking & Investment Services	Banking Services	Banks	Banks (NEC)	5510101010
Financials	Banking & Investment Services	Banking Services	Banks	Corporate Banks	5510101011
Financials	Banking & Investment Services	Banking Services	Banks	Retail & Mortgage Banks	5510101012
Financials	Banking & Investment Services	Banking Services	Banks	Money Center Banks	5510101013
Financials	Banking & Investment Services	Banking Services	Banks	Private Banks	5510101014
Financials	Banking & Investment Services	Banking Services	Banks	Islamic Banks	5510101015
Financials	Banking & Investment Services	Banking Services	Consumer Lending	Consumer Lending (NEC)	5510103010
Financials	Banking & Investment Services	Banking Services	Consumer Lending	Personal & Car Loans	5510103011
Financials	Banking & Investment Services	Banking Services	Consumer Lending	Consumer Credit Cards Services	5510103012
Financials	Banking & Investment Services	Banking Services	Consumer Lending	Consumer Leasing	5510103013
Financials	Banking & Investment Services	Banking Services	Consumer Lending	Credit Unions	5510103014
Financials	Banking & Investment Services	Banking Services	Consumer Lending	Microfinancing	5510103015
Financials	Banking & Investment Services	Banking Services	Corporate Financial Services	Corporate Financial Services (NEC)	5510105010
Financials	Banking & Investment Services	Banking Services	Corporate Financial Services	Commercial Loans	5510105011
Financials	Banking & Investment Services	Banking Services	Corporate Financial Services	Import-Export Banks	5510105012
Financials	Banking & Investment Services	Banking Services	Corporate Financial Services	International Trade Financing	5510105013
Financials	Banking & Investment Services	Banking Services	Corporate Financial Services	Factoring	5510105014
Financials	Banking & Investment Services	Banking Services	Corporate Financial Services	Commercial Leasing	5510105015
Financials	Banking & Investment Services	Investment Banking & Investment Services	Investment Banking & Brokerage Services	Investment Banking & Brokerage Services (NEC)	5510201010
Financials	Banking & Investment Services	Investment Banking & Investment Services	Investment Banking & Brokerage Services	Investment Banking	5510201011
Financials	Banking & Investment Services	Investment Banking & Investment Services	Investment Banking & Brokerage Services	Brokerage Services	5510201012
Financials	Banking & Investment Services	Investment Banking & Investment Services	Investment Banking & Brokerage Services	Inter-Dealer Broker	5510201013
Financials	Banking & Investment Services	Investment Banking & Investment Services	Investment Banking & Brokerage Services	Islamic Investment Banking & Brokerage Services	5510201014
Financials	Banking & Investment Services	Investment Banking & Investment Services	Investment Banking & Brokerage Services	Merchant Banks	5510201015
Financials	Banking & Investment Services	Investment Banking & Investment Services	Investment Management & Fund Operators	Investment Management & Fund Operators (NEC)	5510202010
Financials	Banking & Investment Services	Investment Banking & Investment Services	Investment Management & Fund Operators	Investment Management	5510202011
Financials	Banking & Investment Services	Investment Banking & Investment Services	Investment Management & Fund Operators	Hedge Funds	5510202012
Financials	Banking & Investment Services	Investment Banking & Investment Services	Investment Management & Fund Operators	Collective Investment Fund Operators	5510202013
Financials	Banking & Investment Services	Investment Banking & Investment Services	Investment Management & Fund Operators	Wealth Management	5510202014
Financials	Banking & Investment Services	Investment Banking & Investment Services	Investment Management & Fund Operators	Venture Capital	5510202015
Financials	Banking & Investment Services	Investment Banking & Investment Services	Investment Management & Fund Operators	Private Equity	5510202016
Financials	Banking & Investment Services	Investment Banking & Investment Services	Investment Management & Fund Operators	Islamic Investment Management & Fund Operators	5510202017
Financials	Banking & Investment Services	Investment Banking & Investment Services	Diversified Investment Services	Diversified Investment Services	5510203010
Financials	Banking & Investment Services	Investment Banking & Investment Services	Financial & Commodity Market Operators & Service Providers	Financial & Commodity Market Operators & Service Providers (NEC)	5510205010
Financials	Banking & Investment Services	Investment Banking & Investment Services	Financial & Commodity Market Operators & Service Providers	Securities & Commodity Exchanges	5510205011
Financials	Banking & Investment Services	Investment Banking & Investment Services	Financial & Commodity Market Operators & Service Providers	Clearing, Settlement & Custodial Service	5510205012
Financials	Insurance	Insurance	Multiline Insurance & Brokers	Multiline Insurance & Brokers (NEC)	5530101010
Financials	Insurance	Insurance	Multiline Insurance & Brokers	Islamic Insurance	5530101011
Financials	Insurance	Insurance	Multiline Insurance & Brokers	Insurance Brokers	5530101012
Financials	Insurance	Insurance	Property & Casualty Insurance	Property & Casualty Insurance (NEC)	5530102010
Financials	Insurance	Insurance	Property & Casualty Insurance	Property Insurance	5530102011
Financials	Insurance	Insurance	Property & Casualty Insurance	Insurance - Automobile	5530102012
Financials	Insurance	Insurance	Property & Casualty Insurance	Travel Insurance	5530102013
Financials	Insurance	Insurance	Property & Casualty Insurance	Casualty Insurance	5530102014
Financials	Insurance	Insurance	Life & Health Insurance	Life & Health Insurance (NEC)	5530103010
Financials	Insurance	Insurance	Life & Health Insurance	Life Insurance	5530103011
Financials	Insurance	Insurance	Life & Health Insurance	Health Insurance	5530103012
Financials	Insurance	Insurance	Reinsurance	Reinsurance (NEC)	5530105010
Financials	Insurance	Insurance	Reinsurance	Life & Health Reinsurance	5530105011
Financials	Insurance	Insurance	Reinsurance	Property & Casualty Reinsurance	5530105012
Financials	Collective Investments	Collective Investments	UK Investment Trusts	UK Investment Trusts	5550101010
Financials	Collective Investments	Collective Investments	Mutual Funds	Mutual Funds (NEC)	5550102010
Financials	Collective Investments	Collective Investments	Mutual Funds	Islamic Mutual Funds	5550102011
Financials	Collective Investments	Collective Investments	Closed End Funds	Closed End Funds	5550103010
Financials	Collective Investments	Collective Investments	Exchange-Traded Funds	Exchange-Traded Funds (NEC)	5550104010
Financials	Collective Investments	Collective Investments	Exchange-Traded Funds	Islamic ETFs	5550104011
Financials	Collective Investments	Collective Investments	Exchange-Traded Funds	Islamic Commodity ETFs	5550104012
Financials	Collective Investments	Collective Investments	Pension Funds	Pension Funds	5550105010
Financials	Collective Investments	Collective Investments	Insurance Funds	Insurance Funds	5550106010
Financials	Investment Holding Companies	Investment Holding Companies	Investment Holding Companies	Investment Holding Companies (NEC)	5560101010
Financials	Investment Holding Companies	Investment Holding Companies	Investment Holding Companies	Shell Companies	5560101011
Healthcare	Healthcare Services & Equipment	Healthcare Equipment & Supplies	Advanced Medical Equipment & Technology	Advanced Medical Equipment & Technology (NEC)	5610101010
Healthcare	Healthcare Services & Equipment	Healthcare Equipment & Supplies	Advanced Medical Equipment & Technology	Medical Diagnostic & Testing Equipment	5610101011
Healthcare	Healthcare Services & Equipment	Healthcare Equipment & Supplies	Advanced Medical Equipment & Technology	Medical Monitoring Systems	5610101012
Healthcare	Healthcare Services & Equipment	Healthcare Equipment & Supplies	Advanced Medical Equipment & Technology	Laser Equipment	5610101013
Healthcare	Healthcare Services & Equipment	Healthcare Equipment & Supplies	Advanced Medical Equipment & Technology	Medical Imaging Systems	5610101014
Healthcare	Healthcare Services & Equipment	Healthcare Equipment & Supplies	Advanced Medical Equipment & Technology	Medical Software & Technology Services	5610101015
Healthcare	Healthcare Services & Equipment	Healthcare Equipment & Supplies	Advanced Medical Equipment & Technology	Advanced Medical Equipment Wholesale	5610101016
Healthcare	Healthcare Services & Equipment	Healthcare Equipment & Supplies	Medical Equipment, Supplies & Distribution	Medical Equipment, Supplies & Distribution (NEC)	5610102010
Healthcare	Healthcare Services & Equipment	Healthcare Equipment & Supplies	Medical Equipment, Supplies & Distribution	Medical Supplies	5610102011
Healthcare	Healthcare Services & Equipment	Healthcare Equipment & Supplies	Medical Equipment, Supplies & Distribution	Medical Prosthetics	5610102012
Healthcare	Healthcare Services & Equipment	Healthcare Equipment & Supplies	Medical Equipment, Supplies & Distribution	Medical Equipment	5610102013
Healthcare	Healthcare Services & Equipment	Healthcare Equipment & Supplies	Medical Equipment, Supplies & Distribution	Medical Devices & Implants	5610102014
Healthcare	Healthcare Services & Equipment	Healthcare Equipment & Supplies	Medical Equipment, Supplies & Distribution	Medical Equipment Wholesale	5610102015
Healthcare	Healthcare Services & Equipment	Healthcare Equipment & Supplies	Medical Equipment, Supplies & Distribution	Glasses, Spectacles & Contact Lenses	5610102016
Healthcare	Healthcare Services & Equipment	Healthcare Equipment & Supplies	Medical Equipment, Supplies & Distribution	Laboratory Diagnostic & Testing Substances	5610102017
Healthcare	Healthcare Services & Equipment	Healthcare Equipment & Supplies	Medical Equipment, Supplies & Distribution	Veterinary Medical Equipment & Supplies	5610102018
Healthcare	Healthcare Services & Equipment	Healthcare Equipment & Supplies	Medical Equipment, Supplies & Distribution	Drug Delivery Systems	5610102019
Healthcare	Healthcare Services & Equipment	Healthcare Providers & Services	Healthcare Facilities & Services	Healthcare Facilities & Services (NEC)	5610201010
Healthcare	Healthcare Services & Equipment	Healthcare Providers & Services	Healthcare Facilities & Services	Hospitals, Clinics & Primary Care Services	5610201011
Healthcare	Healthcare Services & Equipment	Healthcare Providers & Services	Healthcare Facilities & Services	Residential & Long-Term Care	5610201012
Healthcare	Healthcare Services & Equipment	Healthcare Providers & Services	Healthcare Facilities & Services	Ambulance & Emergency Services	5610201013
Healthcare	Healthcare Services & Equipment	Healthcare Providers & Services	Healthcare Facilities & Services	Doctor's Office	5610201014
Healthcare	Healthcare Services & Equipment	Healthcare Providers & Services	Healthcare Facilities & Services	Medical & Diagnostic Laboratories	5610201015
Healthcare	Healthcare Services & Equipment	Healthcare Providers & Services	Healthcare Facilities & Services	Veterinary Services	5610201016
Healthcare	Healthcare Services & Equipment	Healthcare Providers & Services	Healthcare Facilities & Services	Telemedicine Services	5610201017
Healthcare	Healthcare Services & Equipment	Healthcare Providers & Services	Healthcare Facilities & Services	Home Healthcare Services	5610201018
Healthcare	Healthcare Services & Equipment	Healthcare Providers & Services	Healthcare Facilities & Services	Alternative Medicine Facilities	5610201019
Healthcare	Healthcare Services & Equipment	Healthcare Providers & Services	Healthcare Facilities & Services	Medical Farming	5610201020
Healthcare	Healthcare Services & Equipment	Healthcare Providers & Services	Managed Healthcare	Managed Healthcare (NEC)	5610202010
Healthcare	Healthcare Services & Equipment	Healthcare Providers & Services	Managed Healthcare	HMO Medical Centers	5610202011
Healthcare	Pharmaceuticals & Medical Research	Pharmaceuticals	Pharmaceuticals	Pharmaceuticals (NEC)	5620104010
Healthcare	Pharmaceuticals & Medical Research	Pharmaceuticals	Pharmaceuticals	Proprietary & Advanced Pharmaceuticals	5620104011
Healthcare	Pharmaceuticals & Medical Research	Pharmaceuticals	Pharmaceuticals	Biopharmaceuticals	5620104012
Healthcare	Pharmaceuticals & Medical Research	Pharmaceuticals	Pharmaceuticals	In-Vivo Diagnostic & Testing Substances	5620104013
Healthcare	Pharmaceuticals & Medical Research	Pharmaceuticals	Pharmaceuticals	Veterinary Drugs	5620104014
Healthcare	Pharmaceuticals & Medical Research	Pharmaceuticals	Pharmaceuticals	Generic Pharmaceuticals	5620104015
Healthcare	Pharmaceuticals & Medical Research	Pharmaceuticals	Pharmaceuticals	Alternative Medicine	5620104016
Healthcare	Pharmaceuticals & Medical Research	Pharmaceuticals	Pharmaceuticals	Recreational Pharmaceuticals	5620104017
Healthcare	Pharmaceuticals & Medical Research	Pharmaceuticals	Pharmaceuticals	Pharmaceuticals Wholesale	5620104018
Healthcare	Pharmaceuticals & Medical Research	Biotechnology & Medical Research	Biotechnology & Medical Research	Biotechnology & Medical Research (NEC)	5620201010
Healthcare	Pharmaceuticals & Medical Research	Biotechnology & Medical Research	Biotechnology & Medical Research	Bio Therapeutic Drugs	5620201011
Healthcare	Pharmaceuticals & Medical Research	Biotechnology & Medical Research	Biotechnology & Medical Research	Bio Diagnostics & Testing	5620201012
Healthcare	Pharmaceuticals & Medical Research	Biotechnology & Medical Research	Biotechnology & Medical Research	Bio Medical Devices	5620201013
Technology	Technology Equipment	Semiconductors & Semiconductor Equipment	Semiconductors	Semiconductors (NEC)	5710101010
Technology	Technology Equipment	Semiconductors & Semiconductor Equipment	Semiconductors	Integrated Circuits	5710101011
Technology	Technology Equipment	Semiconductors & Semiconductor Equipment	Semiconductors	Memory Chips (RAM)	5710101012
Technology	Technology Equipment	Semiconductors & Semiconductor Equipment	Semiconductors	Processors	5710101013
Technology	Technology Equipment	Semiconductors & Semiconductor Equipment	Semiconductors	Semiconductor Wholesale	5710101014
Technology	Technology Equipment	Semiconductors & Semiconductor Equipment	Semiconductors	NFC & RFID Systems	5710101015
Technology	Technology Equipment	Semiconductors & Semiconductor Equipment	Semiconductor Equipment & Testing	Semiconductor Equipment & Testing (NEC)	5710102010
Technology	Technology Equipment	Semiconductors & Semiconductor Equipment	Semiconductor Equipment & Testing	Semiconductor Machinery Manufacturing	5710102011
Technology	Technology Equipment	Semiconductors & Semiconductor Equipment	Semiconductor Equipment & Testing	Semiconductor Testing Equipment & Service	5710102012
Technology	Technology Equipment	Semiconductors & Semiconductor Equipment	Semiconductor Equipment & Testing	Semiconductor Equipment Wholesale	5710102013
Technology	Technology Equipment	Communications & Networking	Communications & Networking	Communications & Networking (NEC)	5710201010
Technology	Technology Equipment	Communications & Networking	Communications & Networking	Network Equipment	5710201011
Technology	Technology Equipment	Communications & Networking	Communications & Networking	Security & Surveillance	5710201012
Technology	Technology Equipment	Communications & Networking	Communications & Networking	Conferencing Tools & Systems	5710201013
Technology	Technology Equipment	Communications & Networking	Communications & Networking	VOIP Equipment & Systems	5710201014
Technology	Technology Equipment	Communications & Networking	Communications & Networking	Broadcasting Equipment	5710201015
Technology	Technology Equipment	Communications & Networking	Communications & Networking	Satellite Communications Network	5710201016
Technology	Technology Equipment	Communications & Networking	Communications & Networking	Fiber Optic Cable Manufacturing	5710201017
Technology	Technology Equipment	Electronic Equipment & Parts	Electronic Equipment & Parts	Electronic Equipment & Parts (NEC)	5710401010
Technology	Technology Equipment	Electronic Equipment & Parts	Electronic Equipment & Parts	Biometric Products	5710401011
Technology	Technology Equipment	Electronic Equipment & Parts	Electronic Equipment & Parts	Advanced Electronic Equipment	5710401012
Technology	Technology Equipment	Electronic Equipment & Parts	Electronic Equipment & Parts	Display Screens	5710401013
Technology	Technology Equipment	Electronic Equipment & Parts	Electronic Equipment & Parts	Electronic Components	5710401014
Technology	Technology Equipment	Electronic Equipment & Parts	Electronic Equipment & Parts	3D Printers	5710401015
Technology	Technology Equipment	Office Equipment	Office Equipment	Office Equipment (NEC)	5710501010
Technology	Technology Equipment	Office Equipment	Office Equipment	Commercial Document Management	5710501011
Technology	Technology Equipment	Office Equipment	Office Equipment	Office Technology Equipment	5710501012
Technology	Technology Equipment	Office Equipment	Office Equipment	Point of Sale Systems	5710501013
Technology	Technology Equipment	Office Equipment	Office Equipment	Scientific & Precision Equipment	5710501014
Technology	Technology Equipment	Office Equipment	Office Equipment	Office Equipment Wholesale	5710501015
Technology	Technology Equipment	Computers, Phones & Household Electronics	Computer Hardware	Computer Hardware (NEC)	5710601010
Technology	Technology Equipment	Computers, Phones & Household Electronics	Computer Hardware	Scientific & Super Computers	5710601011
Technology	Technology Equipment	Computers, Phones & Household Electronics	Computer Hardware	Laptop & Desktop Computers	5710601012
Technology	Technology Equipment	Computers, Phones & Household Electronics	Computer Hardware	Tablet & Netbook Computers	5710601013
Technology	Technology Equipment	Computers, Phones & Household Electronics	Computer Hardware	Input Devices	5710601014
Technology	Technology Equipment	Computers, Phones & Household Electronics	Computer Hardware	Output Devices	5710601015
Technology	Technology Equipment	Computers, Phones & Household Electronics	Computer Hardware	Servers & Systems	5710601016
Technology	Technology Equipment	Computers, Phones & Household Electronics	Computer Hardware	Storage Devices	5710601017
Technology	Technology Equipment	Computers, Phones & Household Electronics	Computer Hardware	Computer Hardware Component Assembly	5710601018
Technology	Technology Equipment	Computers, Phones & Household Electronics	Computer Hardware	Consumer Document Management	5710601019
Technology	Technology Equipment	Computers, Phones & Household Electronics	Phones & Handheld Devices	Phones & Handheld Devices (NEC)	5710602010
Technology	Technology Equipment	Computers, Phones & Household Electronics	Phones & Handheld Devices	Phones & Smart Phones	5710602011
Technology	Technology Equipment	Computers, Phones & Household Electronics	Phones & Handheld Devices	Portable Satellite Navigation	5710602012
Technology	Technology Equipment	Computers, Phones & Household Electronics	Phones & Handheld Devices	Personal Music Players	5710602013
Technology	Technology Equipment	Computers, Phones & Household Electronics	Phones & Handheld Devices	Electronic Books	5710602014
Technology	Technology Equipment	Computers, Phones & Household Electronics	Phones & Handheld Devices	Mobile Device Component Assembly	5710602015
Technology	Technology Equipment	Computers, Phones & Household Electronics	Household Electronics	Household Electronics (NEC)	5710603010
Technology	Technology Equipment	Computers, Phones & Household Electronics	Household Electronics	Photographic Equipment	5710603011
Technology	Technology Equipment	Computers, Phones & Household Electronics	Household Electronics	TV & Video	5710603012
Technology	Technology Equipment	Computers, Phones & Household Electronics	Household Electronics	Home Audio	5710603013
Technology	Technology Equipment	Computers, Phones & Household Electronics	Household Electronics	Consumer Electronic Wholesale	5710603014
Technology	Technology Equipment	Integrated Hardware & Software	Integrated Hardware & Software	Integrated Hardware & Software	5710701010
Technology	Software & IT Services	Software & IT Services	IT Services & Consulting	IT Services & Consulting (NEC)	5720101010
Technology	Software & IT Services	Software & IT Services	IT Services & Consulting	Computer Programming	5720101011
Technology	Software & IT Services	Software & IT Services	IT Services & Consulting	Computer Training	5720101012
Technology	Software & IT Services	Software & IT Services	IT Services & Consulting	Technology Consulting & Outsourcing Services	5720101013
Technology	Software & IT Services	Software & IT Services	IT Services & Consulting	IT Testing Services	5720101014
Technology	Software & IT Services	Software & IT Services	IT Services & Consulting	Cloud Computing Services	5720101015
Technology	Software & IT Services	Software & IT Services	IT Services & Consulting	Machine Learning & Artificial Intelligence (AI) Services	5720101016
Technology	Software & IT Services	Software & IT Services	Software	Software (NEC)	5720102010
Technology	Software & IT Services	Software & IT Services	Software	System Software	5720102011
Technology	Software & IT Services	Software & IT Services	Software	Application Software	5720102012
Technology	Software & IT Services	Software & IT Services	Software	Enterprise Software	5720102013
Technology	Software & IT Services	Software & IT Services	Software	Mobile Application Software	5720102014
Technology	Software & IT Services	Software & IT Services	Software	Mobile System Software	5720102015
Technology	Software & IT Services	Software & IT Services	Software	Programming Software & Testing Tools	5720102016
Technology	Software & IT Services	Software & IT Services	Software	Server & Database Software	5720102017
Technology	Software & IT Services	Software & IT Services	Software	Security Software	5720102018
Technology	Software & IT Services	Software & IT Services	Online Services	Online Services (NEC)	5720103010
Technology	Software & IT Services	Software & IT Services	Online Services	Search Engines	5720103011
Technology	Software & IT Services	Software & IT Services	Online Services	Social Media & Networking	5720103012
Technology	Software & IT Services	Software & IT Services	Online Services	E-commerce & Auction Services	5720103013
Technology	Software & IT Services	Software & IT Services	Online Services	Content & Site Management Services	5720103014
Technology	Software & IT Services	Software & IT Services	Online Services	Internet Security & Transactions Services	5720103015
Technology	Software & IT Services	Software & IT Services	Online Services	Internet Gaming	5720103016
Technology	Financial Technology (Fintech) & Infrastructure	Financial Technology (Fintech) & Infrastructure	Financial Technology (Fintech)	Financial Technology (Fintech) (NEC)	5730101010
Technology	Financial Technology (Fintech) & Infrastructure	Financial Technology (Fintech) & Infrastructure	Financial Technology (Fintech)	Business to Business	5730101020
Technology	Financial Technology (Fintech) & Infrastructure	Financial Technology (Fintech) & Infrastructure	Financial Technology (Fintech)	Business to Consumer	5730101030
Technology	Financial Technology (Fintech) & Infrastructure	Financial Technology (Fintech) & Infrastructure	Financial Technology (Fintech)	Consumer to Consumer	5730101040
Technology	Financial Technology (Fintech) & Infrastructure	Financial Technology (Fintech) & Infrastructure	Crowd Collaboration	Crowd Collaboration (NEC)	5730102010
Technology	Financial Technology (Fintech) & Infrastructure	Financial Technology (Fintech) & Infrastructure	Crowd Collaboration	Crowdfinancing & Crowdfunding	5730102020
Technology	Financial Technology (Fintech) & Infrastructure	Financial Technology (Fintech) & Infrastructure	Crowd Collaboration	Crowdsourcing Platforms	5730102030
Technology	Financial Technology (Fintech) & Infrastructure	Financial Technology (Fintech) & Infrastructure	Blockchain & Cryptocurrency	Blockchain & Cryptocurrency (NEC)	5730103010
Technology	Financial Technology (Fintech) & Infrastructure	Financial Technology (Fintech) & Infrastructure	Blockchain & Cryptocurrency	Cryptocurrency Trading Platforms (Exchanges)	5730103020
Technology	Financial Technology (Fintech) & Infrastructure	Financial Technology (Fintech) & Infrastructure	Blockchain & Cryptocurrency	Blockchain Technology (Software)	5730103030
Technology	Financial Technology (Fintech) & Infrastructure	Financial Technology (Fintech) & Infrastructure	Blockchain & Cryptocurrency	Cryptocurrency Hardware	5730103040
Technology	Financial Technology (Fintech) & Infrastructure	Financial Technology (Fintech) & Infrastructure	Blockchain & Cryptocurrency	Cryptocurrency Mining	5730103050
Technology	Financial Technology (Fintech) & Infrastructure	Financial Technology (Fintech) & Infrastructure	Miscellaneous Fintech Infrastructure	Miscellaneous Fintech Infrastructure	5730109010
Technology	Telecommunications Services	Telecommunications Services	Integrated Telecommunications Services	Integrated Telecommunications Services (NEC)	5740101010
Technology	Telecommunications Services	Telecommunications Services	Integrated Telecommunications Services	Wired Telecommunications Carriers	5740101020
Technology	Telecommunications Services	Telecommunications Services	Integrated Telecommunications Services	Telecommunications Resellers	5740101030
Technology	Telecommunications Services	Telecommunications Services	Integrated Telecommunications Services	Internet Service Providers	5740101040
Technology	Telecommunications Services	Telecommunications Services	Integrated Telecommunications Services	Telecommunications Network Infrastructure	5740101050
Technology	Telecommunications Services	Telecommunications Services	Integrated Telecommunications Services	VOIP Services	5740101060
Technology	Telecommunications Services	Telecommunications Services	Wireless Telecommunications Services	Wireless Telecommunications Services (NEC)	5740102010
Technology	Telecommunications Services	Telecommunications Services	Wireless Telecommunications Services	Alternative Communications Services	5740102020
Technology	Telecommunications Services	Telecommunications Services	Wireless Telecommunications Services	Satellite Service Operators	5740102030
Technology	Telecommunications Services	Telecommunications Services	Wireless Telecommunications Services	Wi-Fi & Wi-Max Providers	5740102040
Technology	Telecommunications Services	Telecommunications Services	Wireless Telecommunications Services	Wireless Telecoms Service Providers	5740102050
Utilities	Utilities	Electrical Utilities & IPPs	Electric Utilities	Electric Utilities (NEC)	5910101010
Utilities	Utilities	Electrical Utilities & IPPs	Electric Utilities	Fossil Fuel Electric Utilities	5910101012
Utilities	Utilities	Electrical Utilities & IPPs	Electric Utilities	Nuclear Utilities	5910101013
Utilities	Utilities	Electrical Utilities & IPPs	Electric Utilities	Power Charging Stations	5910101014
Utilities	Utilities	Electrical Utilities & IPPs	Electric Utilities	Alternative Electric Utilities	5910101020
Utilities	Utilities	Electrical Utilities & IPPs	Electric Utilities	Hydroelectric & Tidal Utilities	5910101021
Utilities	Utilities	Electrical Utilities & IPPs	Electric Utilities	Solar Electric Utilities	5910101022
Utilities	Utilities	Electrical Utilities & IPPs	Electric Utilities	Wind Electric Utilities	5910101023
Utilities	Utilities	Electrical Utilities & IPPs	Electric Utilities	Biomass & Waste to Energy Electric Utilities	5910101024
Utilities	Utilities	Electrical Utilities & IPPs	Electric Utilities	Geothermal Electric Utilities	5910101025
Utilities	Utilities	Electrical Utilities & IPPs	Independent Power Producers	Independent Power Producers (NEC)	5910102010
Utilities	Utilities	Electrical Utilities & IPPs	Independent Power Producers	Fossil Fuel IPPs	5910102011
Utilities	Utilities	Electrical Utilities & IPPs	Independent Power Producers	Renewable IPPs	5910102012
Utilities	Utilities	Electrical Utilities & IPPs	Independent Power Producers	Nuclear IPPs	5910102013
Utilities	Utilities	Natural Gas Utilities	Natural Gas Utilities	Natural Gas Utilities (NEC)	5910201010
Utilities	Utilities	Natural Gas Utilities	Natural Gas Utilities	Natural Gas Distribution	5910201011
Utilities	Utilities	Water & Related Utilities	Water & Related Utilities	Water & Related Utilities (NEC)	5910301010
Utilities	Utilities	Water & Related Utilities	Water & Related Utilities	Water Supply & Irrigation Systems	5910301011
Utilities	Utilities	Water & Related Utilities	Water & Related Utilities	Sewage Treatment Facilities	5910301012
Utilities	Utilities	Water & Related Utilities	Water & Related Utilities	Heating & Air-Conditioning Supply	5910301013
Utilities	Utilities	Multiline Utilities	Multiline Utilities	Multiline Utilities	5910401010
Real Estate	Real Estate	Real Estate Operations	Real Estate Rental, Development & Operations	Real Estate Rental, Development & Operations (NEC)	6010101010
Real Estate	Real Estate	Real Estate Operations	Real Estate Rental, Development & Operations	Office Real Estate Rental & Development	6010101020
Real Estate	Real Estate	Real Estate Operations	Real Estate Rental, Development & Operations	Retail Real Estate Rental & Development	6010101030
Real Estate	Real Estate	Real Estate Operations	Real Estate Rental, Development & Operations	Industrial Real Estate Rental & Development	6010101040
Real Estate	Real Estate	Real Estate Operations	Real Estate Rental, Development & Operations	Residential Real Estate Rental & Development	6010101050
Real Estate	Real Estate	Real Estate Operations	Real Estate Services	Real Estate Services (NEC)	6010102010
Real Estate	Real Estate	Real Estate Operations	Real Estate Services	Office Real Estate Services	6010102020
Real Estate	Real Estate	Real Estate Operations	Real Estate Services	Retail Real Estate Services	6010102030
Real Estate	Real Estate	Real Estate Operations	Real Estate Services	Industrial Real Estate Services	6010102040
Real Estate	Real Estate	Real Estate Operations	Real Estate Services	Residential Real Estate Services	6010102050
Real Estate	Real Estate	Residential & Commercial REITs	Diversified REITs	Diversified REITs	6010201010
Real Estate	Real Estate	Residential & Commercial REITs	Commercial REITs	Commercial REITs (NEC)	6010202010
Real Estate	Real Estate	Residential & Commercial REITs	Commercial REITs	Office REITs	6010202020
Real Estate	Real Estate	Residential & Commercial REITs	Commercial REITs	Retail REITs	6010202030
Real Estate	Real Estate	Residential & Commercial REITs	Commercial REITs	Industrial REITs	6010202040
Real Estate	Real Estate	Residential & Commercial REITs	Residential REITs	Residential REITs	6010203010
Real Estate	Real Estate	Residential & Commercial REITs	Specialized REITs	Specialized REITs (NEC)	6010204010
Real Estate	Real Estate	Residential & Commercial REITs	Specialized REITs	Healthcare REITs	6010204020
Real Estate	Real Estate	Residential & Commercial REITs	Specialized REITs	Hospitality REITs	6010204030
Real Estate	Real Estate	Residential & Commercial REITs	Specialized REITs	Self-Storage REITs	6010204040
Real Estate	Real Estate	Residential & Commercial REITs	Specialized REITs	Timber REITs	6010204050
Real Estate	Real Estate	Residential & Commercial REITs	Specialized REITs	Mortgage REITs	6010204060
Real Estate	Real Estate	Residential & Commercial REITs	Specialized REITs	Islamic REITs	6010204070
Institutions, Associations & Organizations	Institutions, Associations & Organizations	Institutions, Associations & Organizations	Religious Organizations	Religious Organizations	6110101010
Institutions, Associations & Organizations	Institutions, Associations & Organizations	Institutions, Associations & Organizations	Civic & Social Organizations	Civic & Social Organizations	6110102010
Institutions, Associations & Organizations	Institutions, Associations & Organizations	Institutions, Associations & Organizations	Environmental Organizations	Environmental Organizations	6110103010
Institutions, Associations & Organizations	Institutions, Associations & Organizations	Institutions, Associations & Organizations	Charity Organizations	Charity Organizations	6110104010
Institutions, Associations & Organizations	Institutions, Associations & Organizations	Institutions, Associations & Organizations	Professional Organizations	Professional Organizations (NEC)	6110105010
Institutions, Associations & Organizations	Institutions, Associations & Organizations	Institutions, Associations & Organizations	Professional Organizations	Business, Professional & Labor Organizations	6110105020
Institutions, Associations & Organizations	Institutions, Associations & Organizations	Institutions, Associations & Organizations	Professional Organizations	Political Organizations	6110105030
Institutions, Associations & Organizations	Institutions, Associations & Organizations	Institutions, Associations & Organizations	Professional Organizations	Non-Governmental Organizations (NGOs)	6110105040
Government Activity	Government Activity	Government Activity	Government & Government Finance	Government & Government Finance (NEC)	6210101010
Government Activity	Government Activity	Government Activity	Government & Government Finance	Public Finance Activities	6210101020
Government Activity	Government Activity	Government Activity	Legal & Safety Public Services	Legal & Safety Public Services (NEC)	6210102010
Government Activity	Government Activity	Government Activity	Legal & Safety Public Services	Police, Justice & Legal Counsel	6210102020
Government Activity	Government Activity	Government Activity	Legal & Safety Public Services	Fire	6210102030
Government Activity	Government Activity	Government Activity	Government Administration Activities	Government Administration Activities	6210103010
Government Activity	Government Activity	Government Activity	National Security & International Affairs	National Security & International Affairs	6210104010
Academic & Educational Services	Academic & Educational Services	Miscellaneous Educational Service Providers	Miscellaneous Educational Service Providers	Miscellaneous Educational Service Providers	6310101010
Academic & Educational Services	Academic & Educational Services	School, College & University	School, College & University	School, College & University (NEC)	6310201010
Academic & Educational Services	Academic & Educational Services	School, College & University	School, College & University	Nursery & Pre-Schools	6310201020
Academic & Educational Services	Academic & Educational Services	School, College & University	School, College & University	Elementary & Primary Schools	6310201030
Academic & Educational Services	Academic & Educational Services	School, College & University	School, College & University	Colleges & Secondary Schools	6310201040
Academic & Educational Services	Academic & Educational Services	School, College & University	School, College & University	Universities	6310201050
Academic & Educational Services	Academic & Educational Services	School, College & University	School, College & University	School Districts	6310201060
Academic & Educational Services	Academic & Educational Services	Professional & Business Education	Professional & Business Education	Professional & Business Education	6310301010

The sectors are broadly the same as other systems such as ICB, except for the addition of Institutions, Associations & Organizations; Government Activity and Academic & Educational Services.

== See also ==
- Global Industry Classification Standard (GICS)
- Industry classification
- Industry Classification Benchmark (ICB)
- North American Industry Classification System (NAICS)
- Standard Industrial Classification (SIC)
- Statistical Classification of Economic Activities in the European Community (NACE)
