= Refinitiv Indices =

Line of indices and index services

Refinitiv Indices is a line of indices and index services from Refinitiv:

- Country and Region Indices
- "Alpha-creating" "Indices"
- Custom Indices
- Calculation Services

== Country & Region Indices ==
Refinitiv Country & Region Indices include 51 countries and 29 regions worldwide. The indices are free-float market-capitalization weighted. Even though each index is available in price return and total return variants, dividend series are not provided by Refinitiv. The earliest of Refinitiv Country Indices start as late as April 1999.

The full list of Country & Region Indices include:

Country	Mnemonic	RIC	Currency	Timespan
Argentina	XARFLDL	.TRXFLDARP	Argentine Peso	1999-04-01
Australia	XAUFLDL	.TRXFLDAUP	Australian Dollar	1999-04-01
Austria	XATFLDL	.TRXFLDATP	Euro	1999-04-01
Bahrain	XBHFLDL	.TRXFLDBHP	Bahraini Dinar	2004-01-01

51 Countries		24 Regions
Argentina	Malaysia	Africa
Australia	Mexico	APAC
Austria	Morocco	APAC ex Japan
Bahrain	Netherlands	APAC + Russia
Belgium	New Zealand	BIC
Brazil	Norway	BRIC
Canada	Oman	EAFE
Chile	Qatar	EM APAC
China	Pakistan	EM Europe
Czech Republic	Philippines	Europe
Denmark	Poland	Europe ex UK, Ireland
Egypt	Portugal	GCC
Finland	Russia	G7
France	Singapore	Global
Germany	South Africa	Global EM
Greece	Spain	Global ex US
Hong Kong	Sweden	Iberia
Hungary	Switzerland	Latin America
India	Taiwan	MENA
Indonesia	Thailand	NAFTA
Ireland	Turkey	North America
Israel	UAE	OIC
Italy	UK	Perhipheral Eurozone Countries
Japan	US	China, Hong Kong, Taiwan
Korea	Vietnam	
Kuwait

=== Sector Indices ===
Refinitiv Sector Indices are defined using The Refinitiv Business Classification (TRBC). Available globally, by region or by country, Sector Indices are available at each of 10 Economic Sectors, 25 Business Sectors, 52 Industry Groups and 125 Industries. Top level global sector indices are as follows:

- Refinitiv Global Energy Index
- Refinitiv Global Basic Materials Index
- Refinitiv Global Industrials Index
- Refinitiv Global Cyclicals Index
- Refinitiv Global Non-Cyclicals Index
- Refinitiv Global Financials Index
- Refinitiv Global Healthcare Index
- Refinitiv Global Technology Index
- Refinitiv Global Telecommunications Index
- Refinitiv Global Utilities Index

In total, Refinitiv provides 1000+ sector indices (Global, country or region).

=== Commodity Indices ===
The Refinitiv family of commodity indices represents specific subsets of commodities. Our commodity includes the “Refinitiv/CoreCommodity CRB Index” and the “Refinitiv Equal Weight commodity Index”.

=== "Alpha-creating Indices" ===
Despite the fact that the term is an oxymoron, among Refinitiv’s products are something the company markets as "alpha-creating indices" and "optimal indices".

"Refinitiv Lipper Optimal Indices" include five, asset allocation-oriented "indices" that allegedly assess the trade-off between risk and return in diversified portfolios. The five "Target Risk Optimal Indices" are:

- Aggressive Growth
- Growth
- Moderate
- Conservative
- Very Conservative

These "indices" are "optimized" and according to the marketing department at Refinitiv "build on modern portfolio theory to depict the best investment outcome for various levels of risk". "Optimal Target Risk Indices" are used singly or in conjunction with other indices as benchmarks for individual investor portfolios, performance benchmarks for target risk, or as the basis for wealth management.

=== Custom Indices & Index calculation services ===
Refinitiv also creates custom indices and provides calculation services for clients.

== See also ==
- Thomson Reuters Business Classification
- Refinitiv Equal Weight Commodity Index (old name: Continuous Commodity Index)
- Refinitiv/CoreCommodity CRB Index
