= Refinitiv Equal Weight Commodity Index =

US barometer of commodity prices

The Refinitiv Equal Weight Commodity Index (formerly known as the Continuous Commodity Index) is a major US barometer of commodity prices. The index comprises 17 commodity futures that are continuously rebalanced: cocoa, coffee, copper, corn, cotton, crude oil, gold, heating oil, live cattle, live hogs, natural gas, orange juice, platinum, silver, soybeans, Sugar No. 11, and wheat.

== History ==
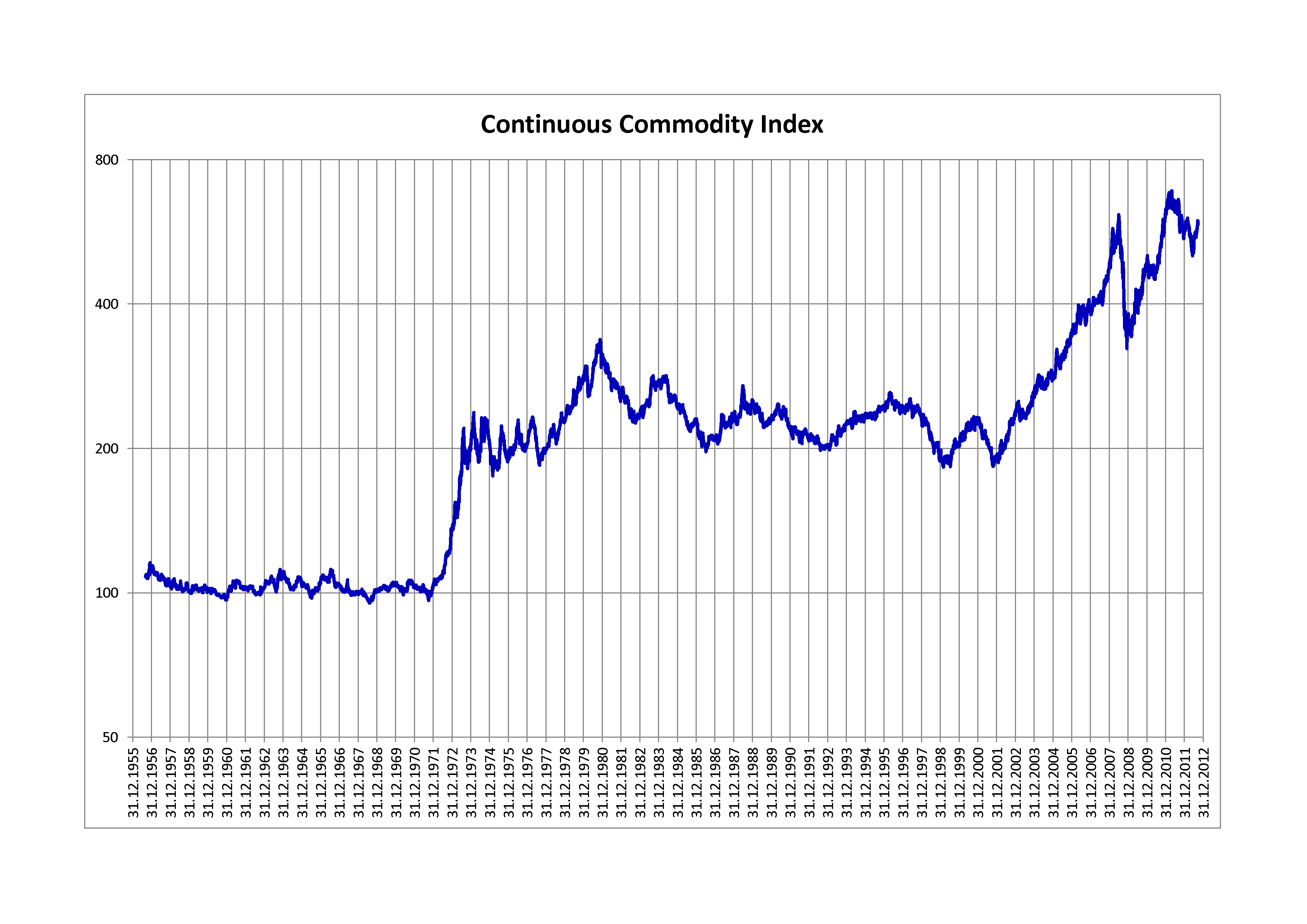
Continuous Commodity Index 1956–2012

The CCI stems from the original CRB Index, created in 1957. It is a ‘snapshot’ of the index at its 9th revision in 1995, before it underwent weighting and rebalance changes in the 10th revision. It is sometimes referred to as the ‘Old CRB’.

The 17 components of the CCI are continuously rebalanced to maintain the equal weight of 5.88%. Since CCI components are equally weighted, they therefore distribute evenly into the major sectors: Energy 17.65%, Metals 23.53%, Softs 29.41% and Agriculture 29.41%. While other commodity indices may overweight in certain sectors (e.g. Energy), the CCI provides exposure to all four commodity subgroups.

The Refinitiv Equal Weight Commodity Index is published real time and is widely disseminated to subscribers including traders, analysts, consultants and media outlets. It is licensed for the creation of over-the-counter products by Refinitiv.

Greenhaven Funds developed a fund that tracks the CCI, called the Greenhaven Continuous Commodity Index Fund (GCC) and now renamed as WisdomTree Continuous Commodity Index Fund.

== Discontinuation ==
Refinitiv discontinued calculation of the Refinitiv Equal Weight Commodity Index on 29 Jan 2021.

As a result of the discontinuation, Wisdomtree modified their ETF strategy considerably in December 2020:

== See also ==
- Refinitiv Indices
- Refinitiv/CoreCommodity CRB Index
- Commodity price index
