= Lists of companies =

This is an index of company-related list articles on Wikipedia.

== Company lists ==
- List of BSE SENSEX companies
- List of companies involved in the Holocaust
- List of companies named after people
- List of companies that switched industries
- List of company and product names derived from indigenous peoples
- List of largest employers
- List of multinational corporations
- List of multinationals with research and development centres in Israel
- List of oldest companies
- List of re-established companies
- List of S&P 400 companies
- List of Six Sigma companies
- List of unicorn startup companies
- List of companies founded by women

== By industry ==
- List of advertising technology companies
- List of animation studios
- List of anime companies
- List of artificial intelligence companies
- List of asset management firms
- List of bakeries
- List of biotechnology companies
- List of bitcoin companies
- List of broadcasting companies in Latin America
- List of bullion dealers
- List of cable television companies
- List of car brands
- List of casinos
- List of Champagne houses
- List of cleaning companies
- List of clock manufacturers
- List of coffee companies
- List of commodity traders
- List of computer hardware manufacturers
- List of computer system manufacturers
- List of concentrating solar thermal power companies
- List of distribution companies
  - List of animation distribution companies
  - List of book distributors
  - List of film distributors by country
- List of DRAM manufacturers
- List of drive-in theaters
- List of duty-free shops
- List of EDA companies
- List of French electric utilities
- List of frozen custard companies
- List of filling stations in North America
- List of film production companies
  - List of film production companies by country
- List of fitness wear brands
- List of food companies
- List of home video companies
- List of ice companies
- List of largest Internet companies
- List of investment banks
- List of IT consulting firms
- List of food trucks
- List of largest chemical producers
- List of seafood companies
- List of tea houses
- List of trading companies
- List of management consulting firms
- List of marketing research firms
- List of mobile network operators
- List of modeling agencies
- List of multi-level marketing companies
- List of OGL publishers
- List of largest oil and gas companies by revenue
- List of oil exploration and production companies
- List of oilfield service companies
- List of pharmaceutical companies
- List of photovoltaics companies
- List of pornographic film studios
- List of pornography companies
- List of printer companies
- List of European power companies by carbon intensity
- List of private equity firms
- List of robotics companies
- List of rum producers
- List of private security companies
- List of ship companies
- List of silicon producers
- List of the largest software companies
- List of private spaceflight companies
- List of renewable energy companies by country
- List of semiconductor companies by country
- List of steel producers
- List of strip clubs
- List of system-on-a-chip suppliers
- List of talent management system companies
- List of tea companies
- List of largest technology companies by revenue
- List of telecommunications companies
- List of television production companies
- List of television networks by country
- List of public utilities
- List of venture capital firms
- Lists of video game companies
- List of video game developers
- List of vineyards and wineries

== By capital ==
- List of public corporations by market capitalization
- List of largest corporate profits and losses
- List of largest companies by revenue
- List of largest technology companies by revenue

== By owner ==
- List of conglomerates
- List of employee-owned companies
- List of franchises
- List of government-owned companies
- List of holding companies
- List of private equity firms
- List of SRI International spin-offs
- Lists of corporate assets

== By type ==
=== Aviation ===
- Lists of airlines

=== Bookstores ===
- List of bookstore chains
- List of independent bookstores
  - List of independent bookstores in the United States

=== Consulting firms ===
- List of IT consulting firms
- List of management consulting firms

=== Food and drink ===
- List of beer and breweries by region
  - List of microbreweries
- List of coffeehouse chains
- List of ice cream parlor chains
- List of restaurant chains
  - List of casual dining restaurant chains
  - List of fast food restaurant chains
  - List of pizza chains
  - List of pizza franchises
- List of soft drink producers

=== Information technology ===
- List of computer hardware manufacturers
- List of computer system manufacturers
- List of IT consulting firms
- List of the largest software companies
- List of largest Internet companies

=== Law firms ===
- Big Five law firms
- List of largest law firms by revenue
- List of largest Chinese law firms
- List of largest European law firms
- List of largest Japanese law firms by number of lawyers
- List of largest United Kingdom-based law firms
- List of law firms by profits per partner

=== Manufacturers ===
- List of elevator manufacturers
- List of wallpaper manufacturers

=== Mobile network operators ===
- List of mobile phone makers by country
- List of mobile network operators
- List of mobile network operators of Europe
- List of mobile network operators of the Americas
- List of mobile network operators of the Asia Pacific region
- List of mobile network operators of the Middle East and Africa
- List of Canadian mobile phone companies
- List of mobile network operators of The Caribbean
- List of United States wireless communications service providers

=== Opera ===
- List of Latin American and South American opera companies
- List of North American opera companies
- List of opera companies in Africa and the Middle East
- List of opera companies in Asia, Australia, and Oceania
- List of opera companies in Europe
- List of opera houses and opera companies in Chicago

=== Raw material ===
- List of copper production by company

=== Retail stores ===
- List of supermarket chains
- List of hypermarkets
- List of superstores
- List of department stores
- List of convenience stores
- List of largest retail companies

== By country ==
- List of companies of Albania
- List of largest Australian companies
- List of companies of Bangladesh
- List of companies of Canada
  - List of largest companies in Canada
- List of companies of Finland
  - List of largest companies in Finland
- List of companies of France
  - List of largest French companies
- List of companies of Germany
  - List of largest German companies
- List of companies of India
  - List of largest companies in India
- List of companies of Indonesia
  - List of largest companies in Indonesia
- List of companies of Japan
  - List of largest Japanese companies
- List of companies of New Zealand
- List of companies of Norway
  - List of the largest companies of Norway
- List of companies of Poland
  - List of railway companies in Poland
- List of companies of Russia
- List of companies of South Korea
  - List of largest companies of South Korea
- List of companies of Spain
  - List of largest Spanish companies
- List of companies of Taiwan
  - List of largest companies in Taiwan
- List of companies of the United Kingdom
  - List of largest United Kingdom employers
- List of companies of the United States by state
- List of companies of Yemen

== By region ==
- List of Arab companies
- List of Caribbean companies
- List of companies of the European Union
- List of largest European manufacturing companies by revenue
- List of largest Nordic companies

== Lists of defunct companies ==
- List of defunct fast-food restaurant chains
- List of defunct gambling companies
- List of defunct graphics chips and card companies
- List of former municipal bus companies of the United Kingdom
- List of defunct network processor companies
- List of defunct utility companies in Victoria, Australia

=== By type ===
==== General ====
- List of former accounting firms
- Lists of defunct airlines
- List of defunct banks of the Netherlands
- List of former investment banks
- List of former consulting firms
- List of defunct hotel chains
- List of defunct hotels in Canada
- List of defunct law firms
- List of defunct glassmaking companies
- List of former tractor manufacturers
- List of defunct railroads of North America
- List of former Australian railway companies
- List of former German railway companies
- List of defunct railway companies in Japan

==== Newspapers ====
- List of defunct newspapers of Australia
- List of defunct newspapers of Canada
- List of defunct newspapers of France
- List of defunct newspapers of Germany
- List of defunct newspapers of Norway
- List of defunct newspapers of Quebec
- List of defunct newspapers of Russia
- List of defunct newspapers of Turkey
- List of defunct newspapers of the United States
  - List of newspapers in Connecticut in the 18th century
  - List of defunct newspapers of Hartford City, Indiana
  - List of newspapers in Maryland in the 18th century
  - List of newspapers in Massachusetts in the 18th century
  - List of newspapers in New Hampshire in the 18th century
  - List of newspapers in New York in the 18th century
  - List of defunct newspapers of North Carolina
  - List of newspapers in Pennsylvania in the 18th century
  - List of newspapers in Rhode Island in the 18th century
  - List of newspapers in South Carolina in the 18th century
  - List of newspapers in Virginia in the 18th century

=== By country ===
- List of defunct Canadian companies
- List of defunct hotels in Canada
- List of defunct airlines of the United States
- List of defunct airports in the United States
- List of defunct automobile manufacturers of the United States
- List of shop signs in Boston in the 18th century
- List of defunct department stores of the United States
- List of defunct restaurants of the United States
- List of defunct railroads of North America
- List of defunct retailers of the United States
- List of defunct television networks in the United States
- List of former transit companies in Dallas

== See also ==
- Corporation-related lists (category)
- Fortune Global 500
- Forbes Global 2000
- List of company types
- List of company registers
- List of lists of lists
- Lists of brands
- Lists of companies by country (category)
- Lists of companies by industry (category)
- Lists of companies by revenue (category)
- Lists of companies by stock exchange (category)
- Lists of corporate mergers and acquisitions (category)
- Lists of occupations
