= List of opera companies in Europe =

This inclusive list of opera companies in Europe contains European opera companies with entries in Wikipedia plus other companies based there. Within the sections for each country, the arrangement is alphabetical by location. For a list of the most important opera companies in the world, see Lists of opera companies. For more inclusive lists of opera companies from other regions, see:

- List of Latin American and South American opera companies
- List of North American opera companies,
- List of opera companies in Africa and the Middle East
- List of opera companies in Asia, Australia, and Oceania

== Albania ==
Company	Principal theatre	Principal location
Teatri i Operas dhe Baletit		Tirana

== Armenia ==
Company	Principal theatre	Principal location
Armenia National Opera and Ballet	Armenian National Academic Theatre of Opera and Ballet; Named after Alexander Spendiarian	Yerevan

== Austria ==
Company	Principal theatre	Principal location
Bregenzer Festspiele		Bregenz
OpernAir Gars		Gars am Kamp
Oper Graz		Graz
Innsbrucker Festwochen der Alten Musik		Innsbruck
Tiroler Landestheater		Innsbruck
Landestheater Linz		Linz
Opera da Camera Linz		Linz
Osterfestspiele Salzburg		Salzburg
Salzburger Festspiele		Salzburg
St. Margarethen Opera Festival		Sankt Margarethen im Burgenland
Jugendstiltheater		Vienna
Razumovsky Ensemble		Vienna
Musiktheatertage Wien Festival		Vienna
sirene Operntheater		Vienna
Volksoper Wien		Vienna
Wiener Kammeroper		Vienna
Wiener Staatsoper		Vienna

== Azerbaijan ==
Company	Principal theatre	Principal location
Azerbaijan State Academic Opera and Ballet Theatre		Baku

== Belarus ==
Company	Principal theatre	Principal location
National Academic Bolshoi Opera and Ballet Theatre of the Republic of Belarus		Minsk

== Belgium ==
Company	Principal theatre	Principal location
Muziektheater Transparant		Antwerp
De Vlaamse Opera		Antwerp
Zomeropera Alden Biesen		Bilzen
La Monnaie (De Munt)	Théâtre Royal de la Monnaie	Brussels
Opéra Royal de Wallonie	Opéra Royal de Liège	Liège

== Bosnia and Herzegovina ==
Company	Principal theatre	Principal location
Bosnian National Opera	National Theatre in Sarajevo	Sarajevo

== Bulgaria ==
Company	Principal theatre	Principal location
Rousse State Opera		Rousse
National Opera and Ballet		Sofia
Varna Opera Theatre		Varna

== Croatia ==
Company	Principal theatre	Principal location
Croatian National Theatre		Zagreb

== Cyprus ==
Company	Principal theatre	Principal location
Pafos Aphrodite Festival Cyprus	The Medieval Pafos Castle	Pafos

== Czech Republic ==
Company	Principal theatre	Principal location
Divadlo Františka Xavera Šaldy		Liberec
Divadlo Josefa Kajetána Tyla		Plzeň
Jihočeské divadlo		České Budějovice
Moravské divadlo Olomouc		Olomouc
National Theatre (Prague)	National Theatre (Prague); Estates Theatre	Prague
National Theatre (Brno)	Janáček Theatre	Brno
Slezské divadlo Opava	SDO	Opava
National Moravian-Silesian Theatre	Antonín Dvořák Theatre	Ostrava
Prague State Opera		Prague
Severočeské divadlo opery a baletu Ústí nad Labem		Ústí nad Labem

== Denmark ==
Company	Principal theatre	Principal location
Aarhus KammerOpera		Aarhus
Aarhus Sommeropera		Aarhus
Den Jyske Opera		Aarhus
Det Kongelige Teater		Copenhagen
Det Nordjyske Operakompagni		Skørping

== Estonia ==
Company	Principal theatre	Principal location
Estonian National Opera		Tallinn
Vanemuine		Tartu

== European Union ==
Company	Principal theatre	Principal location
European Union Opera		Baden-Baden

== Finland ==
Company	Principal theatre	Principal location
Suomen Kansallisooppera		Helsinki
Savonlinnan Oopperajuhlat		Savonlinna

== France ==
Company	Principal theatre	Principal location
Angers-Nantes Opéra	Grand Théâtre d'Angers and Théâtre Graslin	Angers- Nantes
Opéra-théâtre d'Avignon et des Pays de Vaucluse		Avignon
Opéra National de Bordeaux	Grand Théâtre de Bordeaux	Bordeaux
Les Azuriales Opera Festival		Cap Ferrat
Les Arts Florissants	Théâtre de Caen	Caen
Opéra municipal de Clermont-Ferrand		Clermont-Ferrand
Théâtre Imperial de Compiègne		Compiègne
Opéra Éclaté		Colomiers
Opéra de Lille		Lille
Opéra-théâtre de Limoges		Limoges
Opéra national de Lorraine		Lorraine
Opéra National de Lyon	Nouvel Opéra	Lyon
Opéra de Marseille	Opéra Municipal	Marseille
Opera Theatre de Massy		Massy
Opéra Théâtre de Metz		Metz
Opéra national de Montpellier		Montpellier
Opéra de Nice		Nice
Opéra National de Paris	Palais Garnier and L’Opéra de la Bastille	Paris
Opéra-Comique	Salle Favart	Paris
Théâtre du Châtelet		Paris
Grand Théâtre de Provence		Provence
Grand théâtre de Reims		Reims
Opéra de Rennes		Rennes
Opéra de Normandie		Rouen
Opéra-théâtre de Saint-Étienne		Saint-Étienne
Opéra National du Rhin		Strasbourg–Colmar–Mulhouse
Opéra de Toulon		Toulon
Théâtre du Capitole		Toulouse
Grand théâtre de Tours		Tours
L'Opéra of the Palace of Versailles		Versailles
Opéra de Vichy		Vichy

== Georgia ==
Company	Principal theatre	Principal location
Tbilisi Opera and Ballet State Academy Theatre		Tbilisi

== Germany ==
Company	Principal theatre	Principal location	State
Theater Aachen		Aachen	Nordrhein-Westfalen
Rossini in Wildbad		Bad Wildbad	Baden-Württemberg
Bayreuth Festival	Festspielhaus Bayreuth	Bayreuth	Bavaria
Deutsche Oper Berlin		Berlin	Berlin
Komische Oper Berlin		Berlin	Berlin
Staatsoper Unter den Linden		Berlin	Berlin
Theater Bonn	Theater der Bundesstadt	Bonn	Nordrhein-Westfalen
Staatstheater Braunschweig		Braunschweig	Niedersachsen
Theater Bremen	Theater am Goetheplatz	Bremen	Bremen
Oper Chemnitz		Chemnitz	Saxony
Junge Kammeroper Köln		Cologne	Nordrhein-Westfalen
Oper der Stadt Köln		Cologne	Nordrhein-Westfalen
Staatstheater Cottbus		Cottbus	Brandenburg
Staatstheater Darmstadt		Darmstadt	Hessen
Theater Dortmund	Opernhaus Dortmund	Dortmund	Nordrhein-Westfalen
Sächsische Staatsoper Dresden		Dresden	Saxony
Deutsche Oper am Rhein	Opernhaus Düsseldorf and Theater Duisburg	Düsseldorf and Duisburg	Nordrhein-Westfalen
Thüringer Landestheater		Eisenach and Rudolstadt	Thuringia
Theater Erfurt		Erfurt	Thuringia
Opernstudio der Region Nürnberg		Erlangen	Bavaria
Theater Essen	Aalto Theatre	Essen	Nordrhein-Westfalen
Oper Frankfurt	Opern- und Schauspielhaus Frankfurt	Frankfurt	Hesse
Musiktheater im Revier		Gelsenkirchen	Nordrhein-Westfalen
Bühnen der Stadt Gera		Gera	Thuringia
Stadttheater Giessen		Giessen	Hesse
Theater Hagen		Hagen	Nordrhein-Westfalen
Halle Opera	Opernhaus Halle	Halle	Sachsen-Anhalt
Staatsoper Hamburg		Hamburg	Hamburg
Staatsoper Hannover		Hanover	Niedersachsen
Theater Hof		Hof	Bavaria
Badisches Staatstheater		Karlsruhe	Baden-Württemberg
Oper Leipzig		Leipzig	Saxony
Junge Oper Lübeck		Lübeck	Schleswig-Holstein
Nationaltheater Mannheim		Mannheim	Baden-Württemberg
Südthüringisches Staatstheater		Meiningen	Thüringen
Bayerische Staatsoper	Nationaltheater München	Munich	Bavaria
Staatstheater am Gärtnerplatz		Munich	Bavaria
Theater Münster		Münster	Nordrhein-Westfalen
Pocket Opera Company		Nuremberg	Bavaria
Staatstheater Nürnberg		Nuremberg	Bavaria
Theater Regensburg	Theater am Bismarckplatz	Regensburg	Bavaria
Kammeroper Rheinsberg		Rheinsberg	Brandenburg
Staatstheater Stuttgart		Stuttgart	Baden-Württemberg
Ulmer Theater		Ulm	Baden-Württemberg
Hessisches Staatstheater Wiesbaden		Wiesbaden	Hesse
Wuppertaler Bühnen	Opernhaus Wuppertal	Wuppertal	Nordrhein-Westfalen
Mainfranken Theater Würzburg		Würzburg	Bavaria

== Greece ==
Company	Principal theatre	Principal location
Greek National Opera	Olympia Theatre (Maria Callas Central Stage)	Athens
Athens Chamber Opera		Athens
Opera of Thessaloniki	Theatre of the Society for Macedonian Studies	Thessaloniki
Corfu Chamber Opera	Municipal Theatre of Corfu	Corfu

== Hungary ==
Company	Principal theatre	Principal location
Magyar Állami Operaház		Budapest
Szegedi Nemzeti Színház		Szeged
Csokonai Nemzeti Színház		Debrecen
Miskolci Nemzeti Színház		Miskolc
Pécsi Nemzeti Színház		Pécs
Győri Nemzeti Színház		Győr
Moltopera	independent	Budapest

== Iceland ==
Company	Principal theatre	Principal location
The Icelandic Opera		Reykjavík
Icelandic National Opera	National Theatre of Iceland	Reykjavík

== Ireland ==
Company	Principal theatre	Principal location
The Drawing Room Opera Company	Hires out singers	Dublin
Irish National Opera		Dublin
Wexford Festival Opera		Wexford
Glasthule Opera Company	Pavilion Theatre	Dun Laoghaire, County Dublin

== Italy ==
Company	Principal theatre	Principal location
Opera Barga Festival		Barga
Teatro Donizetti		Bergamo
Teatro Comunale		Bologna
Nuovo Teatro Comunale		Bolzano
Teatro Lirico di Cagliari		Cagliari
Teatro Massimo Bellini		Catania
Teatro Ponchielli		Cremona
Teatro Comunale di Firenze	Teatro Comunale Florence	Florence
Maggio Musicale Fiorentino	Teatro Comunale Florence	Florence
Teatro Carlo Felice		Genoa
Fondazione Pergolesi Spontini	Teatro Pergolesi, Spontini Theatre, Comunale Theatre, and Ferrari Theatre	Jesi, Maiolati Spontini, Montecarotto, and San Marcello
Teatro Communale G. B. Pergolesi		Jesi
JesolOpera		Jesolo
Teatro di Messina	Teatro Vittorio Emanuele	Messina
Teatro alla Scala		Milan
Teatro Comunale Modena		Modena
Teatro di San Carlo		Naples
Teatro Massimo		Palermo
Teatro Regio di Parma		Parma
Teatro Fraschini		Pavia
Rossini Opera Festival		Pesaro
Teatro Municipale		Piacenza
Teatro di Pisa		Pisa
Teatro Metastasio		Prato
Ravenna Festival		Ravenna
Operafestival di Roma		Rome
Teatro dell'Opera di Roma		Rome
Teatro Lirico Sperimentale		Spoleto
Opera InCanto		Terni
Teatro Regio di Torino		Turin
Teatro Comunale Giuseppe Verdi		Trieste
Teatro la Fenice		Venice
Arena di Verona		Verona

== Latvia ==
Company	Principal theatre	Principal location
Latvian National Opera		Riga

== Liechtenstein ==
Company	Principal theatre	Principal location
Opera Vaduz		Vaduz

== Lithuania ==
Company	Principal theatre	Principal location
Lithuanian National Opera and Ballet Theatre		Vilnius

== Luxembourg ==
Company	Principal theatre	Principal location
Grand Théâtre de la Ville de Luxembourg		Luxembourg

== Malta ==
Company	Principal theatre	Principal location
Teatru Manoel		Valletta
Aurora Opera House		Gozo
Astra Theatre		Gozo

== Monaco ==
Company	Principal theatre	Principal location
Opéra de Monte-Carlo	Salle Garnier	Monte Carlo

== Netherlands ==
Company	Principal theatre	Principal location
Dutch National Opera (formerly De Nederlandse Opera)	Dutch National Opera & Ballet	Amsterdam
Opera Minora	Dutch National Opera & Ballet	Amsterdam
OperaViva!	Dutch National Opera & Ballet	Amsterdam
OPERA2DAY		Den Haag
Nederlandse Reisopera (formerly Nationale Reisopera)		Enschede
Stichting Opera Groningen		Groningen
Opera Zuid		Maastricht

== North Macedonia ==
Company	Principal theatre	Principal location
Macedonian National Theatre		Skopje

== Norway ==
Company	Principal theatre	Principal location
Operaen i Kristiansund		Kristiansund
Den Norske Opera		Oslo

== Poland ==
Company	Principal theatre	Principal location
Silesian Opera		Bytom
Opera Krakowska		Kraków
Grand Theatre		Poznań
Opera i Operetka w Szczecinie		Szczecin
Polish National Opera	Teatr Wielki, Warsaw	Warsaw
Warszawska Opera Kameralna		Warsaw
Opera Wroclawska		Wrocław
Baltic State Opera		Gdańsk
Podlaska Opera and Orchestra		Białystok

== Portugal ==
Company	Principal theatre	Principal location
Companhia Portuguesa de Opera		Lisbon
Teatro Nacional de São Carlos		Lisbon
Companhia all'Opera		Porto

== Romania ==
Company	Principal theatre	Principal location
Romanian National Opera, Bucharest		Bucharest
Romanian National Opera, Cluj-Napoca		Cluj-Napoca

== Russia ==
Company	Principal theatre	Principal location
Chelyabinsk Opera and Ballet Theatre		Chelyabinsk
Ekaterinburg Opera and Ballet Theatre		Ekaterinburg
Tatar State Opera and Ballet Theatre (named after Musa Jalil)		Kazan
Krasnoyarskiy Gosudarstvennïy Teatr Operï i Baleta		Krasnoyarsk
Amadei Music Theatre		Moscow
Bolshoi Theatre		Moscow
Galina Vishnevskaya Opera Centre		Moscow
Helikon Opera		Moscow
Moscow City Opera		Moscow
Moscow Chamber Musical Theatre (named after Boris Pokrovsky)		Moscow
Stanislavski and Nemirovich-Danchenko Moscow Academic Music Theatre		Moscow
Novaya Opera Theatre		Moscow
Nizhny Novgorod Opera and Ballet Theatre		Nizhny Novgorod
Novosibirsk State Opera		Novosibirsk
Permskiy Akademichesky Teatr Opera i Ballet Im. P. I. Chaykovsky		Perm
Rostov State Musical Theatre		Rostov
Samara Opera and Ballet Theatre		Samara
Mariinsky Opera	Mariinsky Theatre	Saint Petersburg
Mikhaylovsky Theatre		Saint Petersburg
St. Petersburg Chamber Opera Company		Saint Petersburg
Saratovskiy Akademicheskiy Teatr Operï i Baleta		Saratov
The Bashkir State Opera and Ballet Theatre		Ufa
Voronezh State Opera and Ballet Theatre		Voronezh

== Serbia ==
Company	Principal theatre	Principal location
National Theatre in Belgrade		Belgrade
Serbian National Theatre		Novi Sad

== Slovakia ==
Company	Principal theatre	Principal location
Slovak National Theatre		Bratislava
Štátne divadlo Košice		Košice
Štátna opera		Banská Bystrica

== Slovenia ==
Company	Principal theatre	Principal location
Ljubljana Opera and Ballet Slovene National Theatre	Ljubljana Opera House	Ljubljana

== Spain ==
Company	Principal theatre	Principal location
Amics de l'Òpera de Sabadell		Barcelona
Liceu	Gran Teatre del Liceu	Barcelona
ABAO (Asociación Bilbaína de Amigos de la Ópera; The Bilbao Association of Friends of Opera)	Euskalduna Conference Centre and Concert Hall	Bilbao
Teatro Real		Madrid
Teatro Cervantes		Málaga
Ópera de Oviedo		Oviedo
Opera de San Sebastián	Teatro Victoria Eugenia	San Sebastián
Teatro de la Maestranza		Seville
Palau de les Arts Reina Sofía		Valencia

== Sweden ==
Company	Principal theatre	Principal location
Gothenburg opera house		Gothenburg
Malmö Musikteater		Malmö
Södertäljeoperan		Södertälje
Drottningholm Palace Theatre		Stockholm
Folkoperan		Stockholm
Royal Swedish Opera		Stockholm
Regina - Stockholms Operamathus		Stockholm
Norrlandsoperan		Umeå

== Switzerland ==
Company	Principal theatre	Principal location
Theater Basel		Basel
StadtTheater Bern		Bern
Grand Théâtre de Genève		Geneva
Opéra-Studio de Genève		Geneva
Lausanne Opera		Lausanne
Zurich Opera House		Zurich

== Turkey ==
Company	Principal theatre	Principal location
Ankara State Opera and Ballet	Ankara Opera House	Ankara
Antalya State Opera and Ballet		Antalya
Istanbul State Opera and Ballet	Atatürk Cultural Center, Taksim Süreyya Opera House, Kadıköy	Istanbul
İzmir State Opera and Ballet	Elhamra Theater	İzmir
Mersin State Opera and Ballet		Mersin
Samsun State Opera and Ballet		Samsun

== United Kingdom ==
=== England ===
Company	Principal theatre	Principal location
Armonico Consort		Warwickshire
Aldeburgh Festival		Aldeburgh
Bampton Classical Opera		Bampton, Oxfordshire
Barefoot Opera		St. Leonards-on-Sea
Bath International Music Festival		Bath
Birmingham Opera Company		Birmingham
Brighton Festival		Brighton
British Youth Opera		London
Buxton Festival	Buxton Opera House	Buxton
Cambridge Handel Opera Company (CHOC)		Cambridge
Candlelight Opera		Windsor
Charles Court Opera		London
Chelsea Opera Group		London
Classical Opera Company		London
Clonter Opera		Congleton
Company of Singers		London
Dartington Opera		Dartington
Diva Opera		London-based; tours many locations
Early Opera Company		London
English National Opera	London Coliseum	London
English Pocket Opera Company		London
English Touring Opera		London-based; tours many locations
Erratica		London
First Act Opera International		Suffolk
Fulham Opera		Fulham
Garsington Opera		Oxfordshire
Glyndebourne Festival Opera	Glyndebourne	near Lewes
Grange Park Opera		near New Alresford, Hants
Grimeborn		London
HeadFirst Productions		London
Hampstead Garden Opera		London
Hatstand Opera		London
Heritage Opera		Stafford
Iford Arts Festival		Ilford
Imperial Productions		London
Iris Theatre		London
Kentish Opera		Bough Beech
Kings Head Theatre		London
Leeds Youth Opera		Leeds
London Armenian Opera		London
London Festival Opera		London
London Opera Players, The New		Surrey
Longborough Festival Opera		Longborough, Glos
Mahogany Opera		London
Merry Opera		London
Midsummer Opera		London
Modern Music Theatre Troupe		London
National Opera Studio		London
New Chamber Opera		Oxford
New Sussex Opera		Lewes
Opera A La Carte		London
Opera Anywhere		Sunningwell, Oxfordshire
Opera Brava		Haywards Heath
Opera della Luna		Oxford
Opera for All		Wembley
Opera Holland Park		London
Opera Integra		London
Opera Interludes / London Festival Opera		London and elsewhere
Opera Lyrica		Oxford
Opera North	Grand Theatre Leeds	Leeds
Opera Seria	Studio Theatre, Royal Northern College of Music	Manchester
Opera South		Haslemere, Surrey
OperaUpClose		London
Pegasus Opera Company		London
Random Opera Company		Warwickshire and elsewhere
The Royal Opera, Covent Garden	Royal Opera House	London
Ryedale Festival		Ryedale
Salisbury International Arts Festival		Salisbury
Shadwell Opera		London
Streetwise Opera		London
Surrey Opera	Harlequin Theatre, Redhill	Croydon, Surrey
Tête à Tête		London
The Opera Project		Bucknell, Shropshire
University College Opera	The UCL Bloomsbury	London
W11 Opera		London
Waterperry Opera Festival	Waterperry Gardens	Oxfordshire
West Green House		Hartley Wintney
Westminster Opera		London
Woodhouse Summer Opera Festival		Holmbury St Mary

=== Northern Ireland ===
Company	Principal theatre	Principal location
Castleward Opera		Strangford Lough
NI Opera	Grand Opera House, Belfast	Belfast

=== Scotland ===
Company	Principal theatre	Principal location
Edinburgh Grand Opera		Edinburgh
Fife Opera	Adam Smith Theatre	Kirkcaldy
Naked Opera		Glasgow
Opera on a Shoestring		Glasgow
Scottish Opera	Theatre Royal, Glasgow	Glasgow
Sonica Glasgow		Glasgow
St Magnus Festival		Orkney

=== Wales ===
Company	Principal theatre	Principal location
Mid Wales Opera	Theatr Hafren	Newtown
Music Theatre Wales		Cardiff
Opra Cymru		Ffestiniog
Swansea City Opera		Swansea
Welsh National Opera	Wales Millennium Centre	Cardiff

== Ukraine ==
Company	Principal theatre	Principal location
National Opera of Ukraine		Kyiv
Odesa National Academic Theatre of Opera and Ballet		Odesa
Dnipropetrovsk Academic Theatre of Opera and Ballet		Dnipro
Solomiya Krushelnytska Lviv State Academic Theatre of Opera and Ballet		Lviv
Donetsk State Academic Opera and Ballet Theatre named after A. Solovyanenko		Donetsk
Kharkiv State Academic Opera and Ballet Theatre		Kharkiv
