= List of Arab organizations =

Below is a list of Arab organizations by area of interest.

== Cultural organizations ==
- Arab States Broadcasting Union
- Arab Chess Federation

== Economic organizations ==
- Arab Industrial Development and Mining Organization
- Arab Monetary Fund
- Arab Organization for Industrialization
- Council of Arab Economic Unity
- Greater Arab Free Trade Area – a treaty made by several Arab countries to make an Arab Common Market. The treaty was signed in 1997.
- Gulf Cooperation Council – a minor Arab organization, concerned with economic cooperation, It includes all Arab Persian Gulf states except Iraq. Yemen and Iraq are both possible members of the organization.
- Organization of the Petroleum Exporting Countries

== Educational organizations ==
- Arab Open University
- Association of Arab Universities
- Association of Arab and European Universities
- Fawakih

== Political organizations ==
- Arab League – an organization that includes 22 members and 2 observers, and concentrates mainly on Political issues rather than Economical and Social ones.
- Arab Maghreb Union – a minor Arab organization that includes, Mauritania, Morocco, Algeria, Libya and Tunisia. The organization was affected greatly in its sufficiency by the ongoing conflict in Western Sahara.

== Scientific organizations ==
- Arab Forum for Environment and Development (AFED)

== Sports organizations ==
- Pan Arab Games
- Union of Arab Football Associations (UAFA)

== See also ==
- List of Arab companies
