= Nicholas Heath (disambiguation) =

Nicholas Heath was archbishop of York.

Nicholas Heath is also the name of:

- Nicholas Heath (director), opera director
- Nick Heath (producer), TV and film producer
- Nick Heath (baseball), American baseball player
