= European University =

European University may refer to:

- EU Business School, a private business school
- European University of Tirana, Tirana, Albania
- European University of Armenia
- Alma Mater Europaea of the European Academy of Sciences and Arts, Salzburg, Austria
- European University of Bangladesh, a private university in Bangladesh
- European University College Brussels, former name of Hogeschool-Universiteit Brussel, Belgium
- European University of Lefke, Lefka, Cyprus
- European University Cyprus, Nicosia, Cyprus
- European University of Brittany, France
- European University (ევროპის უნივერსიტეტი), Tbilisi, Georgia
- European University Viadrina in Brandenburg, Germany
- European University Institute, Florence, Italy
- European University-North Macedonia, Skopje, Macedonia
- European University of Lisbon, Lisbon, Portugal
- European University at Saint Petersburg, Saint Petersburg, Russia
- European University, Belgrade, a private university in Serbia
- European University of Madrid (Universidad Europea), Madrid, Spain

== See also ==
- Medieval university
- Central European University in Budapest and Vienna
- European University Association
