= BMC =

BMC may refer to:

== Business and organizations ==
- Beard Miller Company, a US accounting firm
- BioMed Central, a UK scientific publisher
- BMC Software, a US company
- BMC Switzerland, a Swiss bicycle manufacturer
- British Mountaineering Council
- Brunei Methanol Company, Bruneian state owned petrochemical facility
- Bulk mail center
- Burma Muslim Congress, a former political party

=== Automobiles ===
- BMC (Turkey), a manufacturer
- British Motor Corporation, a former UK manufacturer
  - British Motor Corporation (Australia)

=== Education ===
- Bangalore Medical College, India
- Bangladesh Medical College
- Bengal Music College, Kolkata, India
- Black Mountain College, North Carolina, US
- Blue Mountain College, Mississippi, US

=== Government ===
- Beltsville Messaging Center, a U.S. telecoms relay facility
- Bhopal Municipal Corporation, Madhya Pradesh, India
- Bhubaneswar Municipal Corporation, Odisha, India
- Boston Municipal Court, US
- Brigade Modernization Command, US Army
- Brihanmumbai Municipal Corporation, Mumbai, India

=== Hospitals ===
- Baystate Medical Center, Springfield, MA, US
- Boston Medical Center, MA, US
- Bicol Medical Center, Philippines

== Science and technology ==
- Bone mineral content
- Bulk moulding compound, a thermosetting polymer

=== Computing ===
- Baseboard Management Controller, a microcontroller
- Biphase mark code, digital encoding method

== Other uses ==
- Barrie Molson Centre, Ontario, Canada
- BMC Racing Team, cycling team
- Bordel militaire de campagne, French military mobile brothel
- Botswana Meat Commission FC, a football club
- "BxMxC", a 2020 song by Babymetal
