= List of re-established companies =

This is a list of re-established companies. This list comprises companies that became defunct, but were later re-established, with the same name, under a new incorporation or management.

== Re-established companies ==
- 20th Century Fox Records
- 4th & B'way Records
- Abercrombie & Fitch
- Acclaim Entertainment
- Acorn Computers (2006)
- Agitprop! Records
- Albert Productions
- American Record Company
- Ansett Australia
- Apex Records (Canada)
- Ardent Records
- Arena Football League
- Argus (camera company)
- Asylum Records
- Atlus
- Attack Records
- Avalanche Software
- Azuli Records
- BankUnited
- Bennigan's
- Best & Co.
- Biograph Company
- Black Swan Records
- Blue Thumb Records
- Bromley Originate Change
- Brunswick Records
- Builders Square
- Cameo-Parkway Records
- Canaan Records
- CanJet
- Carolco Pictures
- Casablanca Records
- CBS Productions
- Charisma Records
- Claridge Records
- CNR Music
- Coleco
- Commodore International
- Compass Airlines
- Crazy Eddie – Went defunct in 1989, was revived in 2005, went defunct again, was revived again in 2012
- Creation Records
- Cryo Interactive
- Cryptovision Records
- Dark Horse Records
- Deram Records
- Diamond Records
- Disturbing tha Peace
- Dow Chemical Company
- Dunwich Records
- DuPont
- Duquesne Brewing Company
- Edison Records
- Embassy Records
- Epic/Sony Records
- Epitaph Records
- F-Beat Records
- Factory Records
- Flybe re-established in 2022
- Fontana Records
- Format Films
- Galaxy Records
- Gennett Records
- Go! Discs
- Goody's (store)
- Grand Prix Drivers' Association
- Grateful Dead Records
- Gulf Oil
- Hallmark Records
- Harmony Records
- Harvest Records
- Heartbeat Productions
- Hechinger
- Herwin Records
- Hickory Records
- Hostess (snack cakes)
- IBM India
- ImageMovers
- Imperial Records
- Impulse! Records
- Industrial Records
- I.R.S. Records
- Italy Records
- Jacobson's
- Kama Sutra Records
- Latent Recordings
- Lava Records
- Liberty Records
- Lincoln Records
- Linens 'n Things
- Loud Records
- Marvel Music
- Mokum Records
- Montgomery Ward
- Morgan-McClure Motorsports
- Namco
- Northern League (baseball, 1993–2010)
- NorthWestern Corporation
- Okeh Records
- Old HB
- Oriole Records (UK)
- Orion Pictures
- Packard Bell
- Pan American Airways (1996–1998)
- Pan American Airways (1998–2004)
- Pan Am (2026)
- Paramount Records
- Paramount Television
- Peacock Records
- Perfect Records
- Playboy Records – relaunched as a jazz label distributed by Concord Records
- The Pop Shoppe
- Priority Records
- Lilly Pulitzer
- Quality Records
- Radar Records
- Radiex Records
- Rankin/Bass Productions
- RCA
- RCA Music Group
- Red Letter Days
- Regal Recordings
- Regal Zonophone Records
- Reprise Records
- RKO/Unique Records
- RockResorts
- Rough Trade Records
- Salsoul Records
- Seeland Records
- Selig Polyscope Company
- Service Merchandise
- Sierra Entertainment
- Silvertone Records (1916)
- Slash Records
- Smash Records
- SNK
- Sonar Entertainment
- Soul City Records (American label)
- Stateside Records
- Stiff Records
- StreetSounds (record label)
- Sun Country Airlines
- Sunshine Records (United States)
- T-Neck Records
- Toys "R" Us
- TriStar Pictures
- Turner Pictures
- Uni Records
- Vee-Jay Records
- Verve Forecast Records
- Verve Records
- Vocalion Records
- Walter Lantz Productions
- Warner Bros. Cartoons
- White Noise Records
- Wing Records
- The Wiz (store)
- WRocK Online
- WXB 102
- Zantigo
- Zonophone

== See also ==
- Lists of companies
