= Opera a la Carte =

Opera a la Carte may refer to:

- Opera a la Carte (UK), a UK-based chamber opera company
- Opera a la Carte (US), a Los Angeles USA-based Gilbert and Sullivan professional touring company
