= List of opera companies in Asia, Australia, and Oceania =

This inclusive list of opera companies in Asia, Australia, and Oceania contains opera companies with entries in the Wikipedia plus other particularly noted companies based in those regions. For opera companies from other continents, see List of opera companies.

== Asia ==
=== China ===
Name of company	Principal theatre	Principal location
Beijing Opera		Beijing
Musica Viva (HK)		Hong Kong
Opera Hong Kong		Hong Kong

=== Japan ===
Name of company	Principal theatre	Principal location
Fujiwara Opera		Tokyo
New National Theatre Tokyo		Tokyo
Nihon Opera Kyokai		Tokyo
Tokyo Opera Nomori		Tokyo

=== Korea ===
Name of company	Principal theatre	Principal location
Seoul Opera		Seoul

=== Malaysia ===
Name of company	Principal theatre	Principal location
Kuala Lumpur City Opera		Kuala Lumpur

=== Philippines ===
Name of company	Principal theatre	Principal location
Lyric Opera of the Philippines		Manila
Philippine Opera Company		Manila

=== Singapore ===
Name of company	Principal theatre	Principal location
Singapore Lyric Opera		Singapore
New Opera Singapore		Singapore
L'arietta Productions		Singapore

=== Thailand ===
Name of company	Principal theatre	Principal location
Bangkok Opera		Bangkok

=== Sri Lanka ===
Name of company	Principal theatre	Principal location
Opera de Ceylon		Mirigama

== Australia ==
Name of company	Principal theatre	Principal location
State Opera of South Australia	Festival Theatre, Adelaide Festival Centre	Adelaide
Opera Queensland	Lyric Theatre, Queensland Performing Arts Centre	Brisbane
National Opera		Canberra
Chamber Made		Melbourne
Melbourne Opera	Athenaeum Theatre	Melbourne
Melbourne City Opera		Melbourne
Victorian Opera		Melbourne
West Australian Opera	His Majesty's Theatre	Perth
Opera Australia	Joan Sutherland Theatre, Sydney Opera House	Sydney
Pinchgut Opera	City Recital Hall	Sydney
Gilbert & Sullivan Opera Sydney		Sydney
Harbour City Opera		Sydney
Concordia Ensemble		Sydney
Rockdale Opera Company	Rockdale Town Hall	Sydney
The House that Dan Built		Sydney
Sydney Chamber Opera	Carriageworks	Sydney

== Oceania ==
=== New Zealand ===
Name of company	Principal theatre	Principal location
Class Act Opera		Auckland
New Zealand Opera	ASB Theatre	Auckland
Canterbury Opera		Christchurch
Opera Factory		Newmarket
