= List of defunct hotels in Canada =

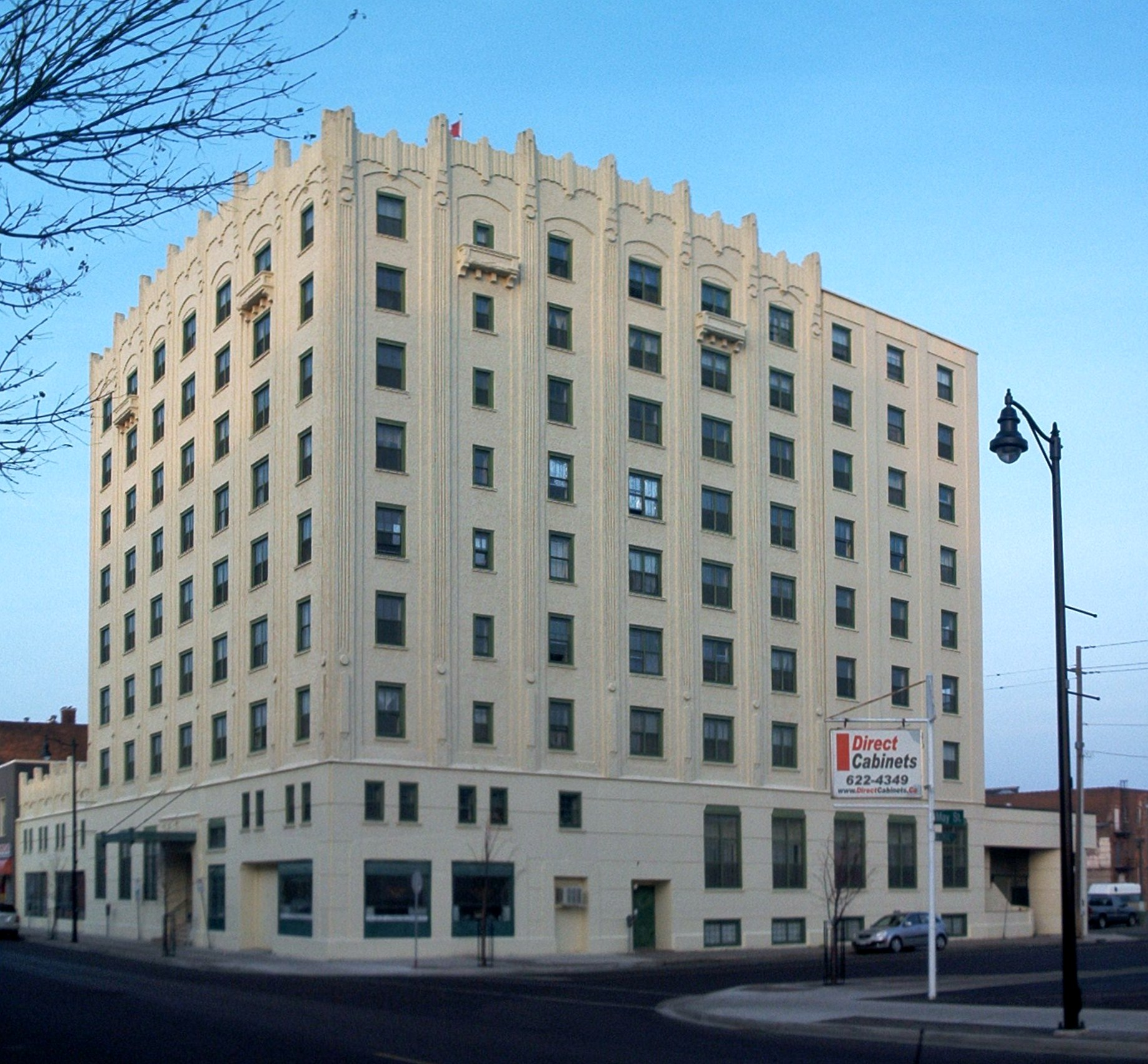
The Royal Edward Arms is now a social housing apartment building.

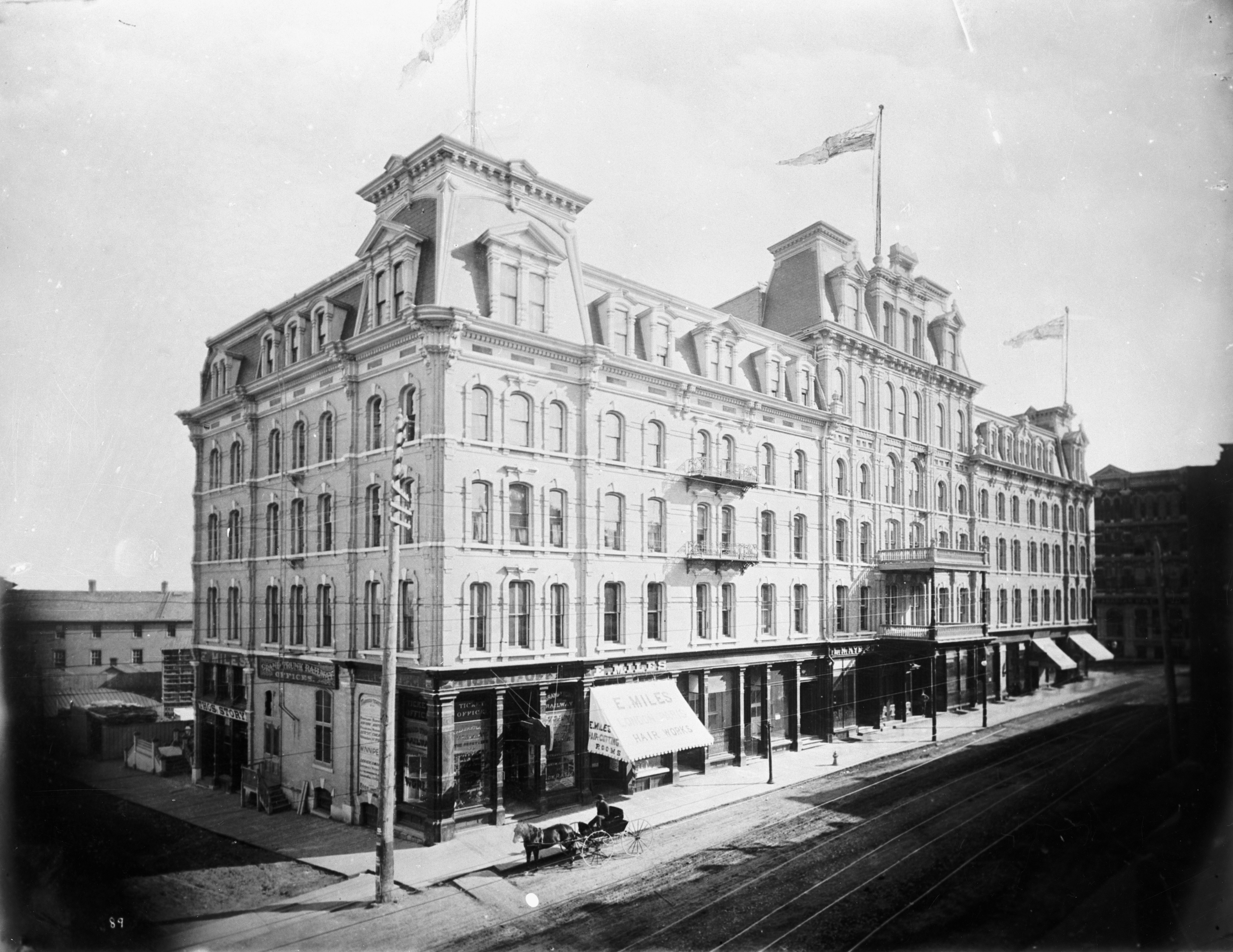
The Russell Hotel circa 1883

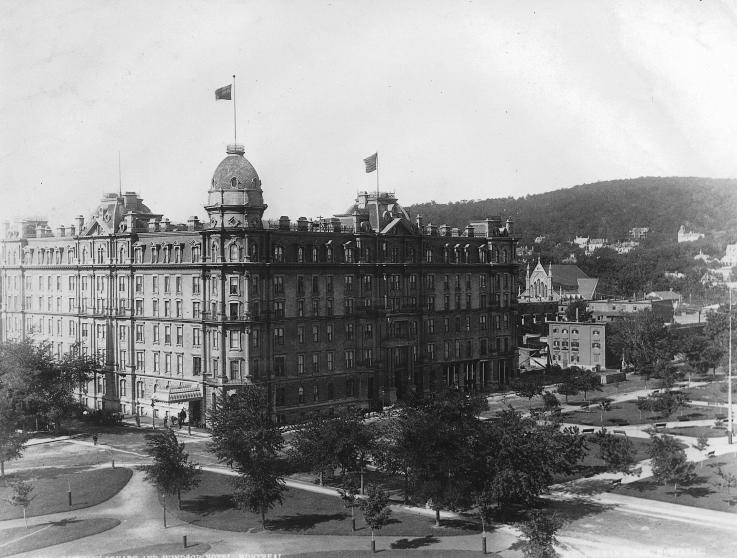
The Windsor Hotel circa 1890

This is a list of defunct hotels in Canada.

== Defunct hotels in Canada ==
British Columbia

- Coast Plaza Hotel, Vancouver
- Empire Landmark Hotel, Vancouver
- Hotel Europe, Vancouver
- Hotel Vancouver, Vancouver

Ontario

- Colony Hotel, Toronto
- Duke of York Hotel, Toronto - now a public house only
- The Edwin, Toronto
- Empress Hotel (Toronto)
- Ford Hotel, Toronto
- Highland Inn, Algonquin Provincial Park
- Hotel Waverly, Toronto
- Inn on the Park, North York
- Guild Inn, Toronto
- John Finch's Hotel, Toronto
- Lady Evelyn Hotel, Temagami
- Lambton House, Toronto
- Lord Simcoe Hotel, Toronto
- Minaki Lodge, Minaki
- Montgomery's Inn, Etobicoke
- National Hotel, Toronto
- Regal Constellation Hotel, Toronto
- Rossin House Hotel, Toronto
- Royal Connaught Hotel, Hamilton
- Royal Edward Arms, Thunder Bay
- Royal Muskoka Hotel, Lake Rosseau
- Russell House (Ottawa)
- Sutton Place Hotel Toronto, Toronto
- Wawa Hotel, Lake of Bays
- Warwick Hotel (Toronto)

Quebec

- Chateau Aeroport-Mirabel, Mirabel
- Donegana's Hotel, Montreal
- Exchange Coffee House, Montreal
- Laurentian Hotel, Montreal
- Mount Royal Hotel, Montreal
- Ottawa Hotel, Montreal
- Place Viger, Montreal
- Windsor Hotel (Montreal)

New Brunswick

- Admiral Beatty Hotel
  - Dufferin Hotel

Yukon

- Grand Forks Hotel, Dawson City

== See also ==
- List of defunct hotel chains
- Lists of hotels – an index of hotel list articles on Wikipedia
