= Lausanne Opera =

Opera house in Lausanne, Switzerland

Coordinates: 46.5181°N 6.6369°E

- Opéra de Lausanne
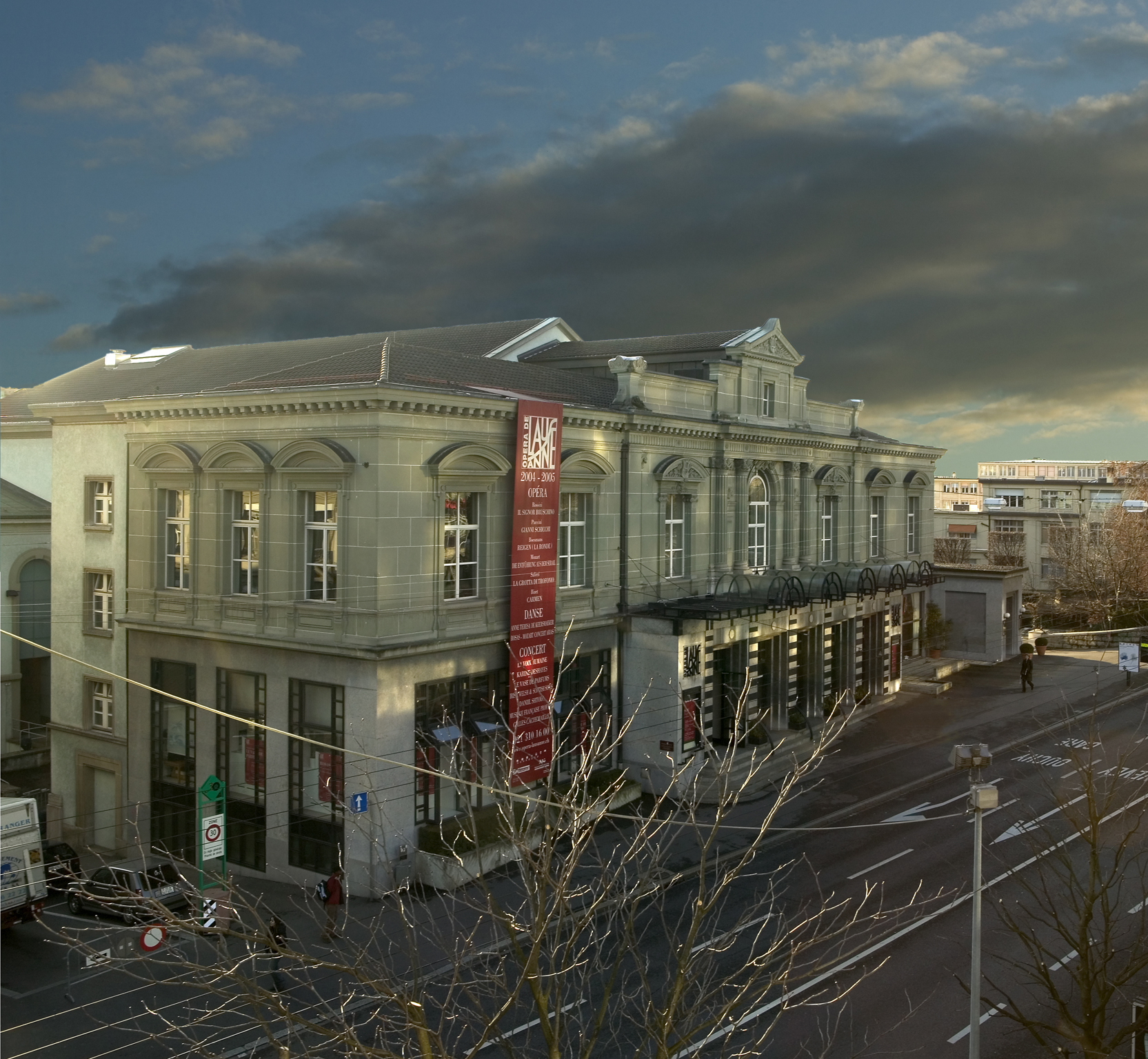
- Interactive map of Lausanne Opera
- Address: Avenue du Théatre 12; 1002 Lausanne; Lausanne; Switzerland

Website
- www.opera-lausanne.ch

The Lausanne Opera is an opera house based in Lausanne, Switzerland. With a stage renovation in 2012, the Lausanne Opera offers a wide variety of operas, from baroque to contemporary, along with concerts and ballets.

== History ==
The opening ceremony took place on 10 May 1871. In 2007 the Opera House closed for renovations that lasted until 2012, when it reopened. These renovations included updating the building and extending the stage.

== See also ==
- List of opera houses
- List of opera companies in Europe
