= John Rippiner Heath =

British musician (1887–1950)

John Rippiner Heath (4 January 1887 - 23 December 1950) was a British composer, violinist and physician who lived and worked for most of his life in Wales.

== Life ==
Heath was born in Birmingham the son of Professor Robert Heath, principal of Birmingham University's Mason College. He was educated at Clifton College before studying medicine at Trinity College, Cambridge. As a musician he was largely self taught, though he led many string quartets for the University Musical Club. In 1913 he became a medical practitioner in Barmouth, Wales. During World War I he served as a doctor in the Royal Army Medical Corps, stationed in the Balkans.

Returning to his Barmouth practice after the war, Heath became associated with musicians including Alfred Perceval Graves, Joseph Holbrooke and Granville Bantock. In April 1919, A P Graves' son, the poet Robert Graves, asked Heath to set his poems for children (The Penny Fiddle) to music, but the music never materialised. In 1922 he established and became the conductor of the Barmouth Choral Union, a choir which entered choral competitions around the country. He wrote for the Meirion Welsh Ballet Company and helped organize the Harlech Festival, whose driving force was Walford Davies.

Heath continued to practice as a doctor until a few days before his death in 1950 and was highly valued for his humanity and compassion, which earned him the epitaph "The Beloved Physician".

He was survived by his wife, son and daughter. His son Kenneth Heath (1919-1977) became principal cellist with the London Symphony Orchestra, and first performed his father's Cello Concerto in 1938 when he was 19 years old. Kenneth was also a founder member of the Academy of St Martin in the Fields. His son Nicholas Heath is an opera director.

== Music ==
Heath was a prolific composer, influenced both by Wales and his time in Salonica during the first war. Earlier in his career he was considered a forward looking composer, and enjoyed considerable success in Britain during the period 1919–24, with support and performances from the conductor Henry Wood, the singer Astra Desmond and the pianist Benno Moiseiwitsch. Writing in 1924, Arthur Eaglefield Hull described him as a composer who wrote "in a modern style which eliminates all literary and philosophical interest and relies on the purely musical appeal". Some 20 of his works were published over this period.

Two pieces inspired by his time in Salonica - the Serbian Quartet and the Three Macedonian Sketches - were particularly popular, and used themes and rhythms he heard while there. Performances at The Proms and on BBC radio helped him gain national attention. The Slopes of Kaimactchalen, an orchestral overture, was heard at The Proms, Queen's Hall in October 1919 with the composer conducting. A second Proms appearance came in October 1923 with his orchestral Scherzo. And there were further significant performances in London, Birmingham and Liverpool.

But after 1925 his profile outside of Wales went into sharp decline, even though he continued to compose. The Lamp, a symbolic drama for actors, singers and chamber ensemble, was written during the early 1920s, but not broadcast by the BBC until July 15, 1938. Later works include his Symphonic Study No. 2, written in response to the Second World War and dedicated to the men on the beaches at Dunkirk, inspired by John Masefield's poem Nine Days' Wonder. The Cello Concerto, written in 1938 for his son Kenneth, was revived in 1962, and again on 1 October 2019 at St John's Smith Square.

Some scores have been lost, including multiple violin sonatas (six) and trios (three?). But a substantial archive of manuscripts are held in the National Library of Wales and the Hugh Owen Library, Aberystwyth University.

== Works ==
Orchestra

- The Slopes of Kaimactchalen (Proms, 1919)
- Scherzo (Proms, 1923)
- Three Characteristic Dances (strings and timpani) (before 1924)
- Three Picturesque Pieces (before 1924)
- Three Pieces for String Orchestra: Overture, Romance, and Rondel (broadcast 1951)
- Concerto for flute, clarinet and bassoon (before 1936)
- May Eve: A Phantasie for Orchestra
- Welsh Fantasy (c 1936)
- Cello Concerto (1938)
- Symphonic Overture (before 1931)
- Symphonic Study No. 1
- Symphonic Study No. 2 (1942)
- Symphony for String Orchestra
- Triple Concerto

Chamber and instrumental music

- Five Pictures of the Night for piano (published 1919)
- Serbian string quartet (published 1919)
- Three Macedonian Sketches for violin and piano (published 1919)
- Violin Sonata (before 1919)
- Septet for strings and wind (before 1921)
- In the Heart of the Country, for violin and piano (before 1924)
- Six Inventions for piano
- Reflexions for piano (published 1923)
- Four Humoresques for piano
- A Child's Night, suite for piano
- A Rune, for piano (published 1923)

Dramatic

- The Lamp, for actors, dancers, chorus and wind quintet, libretto W A Stokes (1920)
- In the Valley of White Poppies, choreographic opera (also orchestral suite, before 1920)
- The Nut Tree, children's ballet (broadcast March, 1938)
- Pannyra of the Golden Heel, ballet (extracts broadcast March, 1938)
- The Harp of Caergia, Welsh ballet (extracts broadcast March, 1938)

Choral and song

- The Enchanted Hour, song cycle (published 1920)
- Admiral Death, for baritone and orchestra (before 1924)
- Il Bosco Sacro, three part female voices, string quartet and harp (before 1924)
- Three Welsh Landscapes (before 1924)
- Three Short Love Songs (before 1924)
- A Summer Song (words: Robert Nichols) (before 1924)
- Over 100 songs
