= Arab Monetary Fund =

Regional Arab organization

Coordinates: 24.481264°N 54.349950°E

- صندوق النقد العربي
- Abbreviation: AMF
- Formation: 27 April 1976; 50 years ago
- Founder: Arab League
- Founded at: Rabat, Morocco
- Type: Arab League institution
- Purpose: To establish policies of Arab monetary co-operation and promote the development of Arab financial markets
- Headquarters: Abu Dhabi, United Arab Emirates
- Region served: Arab world
- Methods: short-and medium-term loans, asset management, encouraging trade
- Fields: Development finance
- Members: 22 Member States (2019)
- Director General Chairman of the Board: Dr. Fahad M. Alturki
- Parent organization: Arab League
- Website: www.amf.org.ae

The Arab Monetary Fund (AMF) (Arabic: صندوق النقد العربي) is a regional Arab organization, a working sub-organization of the Arab League. It was founded in 1976, and has been operational since 1977.

== History ==
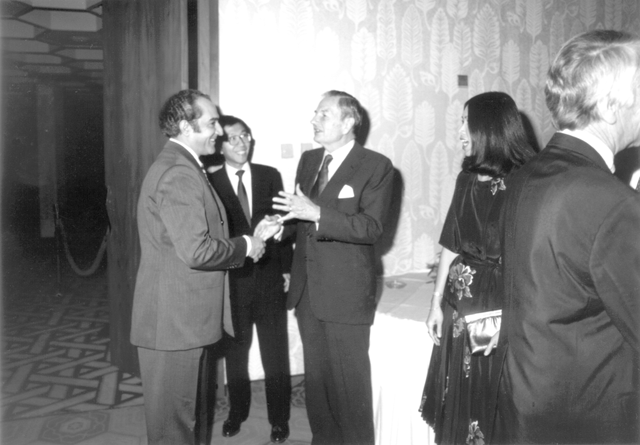
1980: During his visit to Abu Dhabi, David Rockefeller (right) shaking hands with Jawad Hashim (left), President of the Arab Monetary Fund at that time, discussing the secondment of Nemir Kirdar from Chase-Manhattan to the Arab Monetary Fund, with the intention to embark on a detailed study for the establishment of an investment entity with international dimensions.

The first president and director of the Arab Monetary Fund, from 1977 to 1982, was Jawad Hashim. In 1982, the Arab Monetary Fund funded and supervised the launch of Investcorp. Nemir Kirdar was transferred from Chase, where he advised the AMF, to Abu Dhabi to develop the new fund. Omar Aggad was the first investor in this fund.

Still in 1982, the AMF inaugurated the Arab Monetary Fund building in Abu Dhabi.

In 1992, the AMF published its yearly Arab Economic Report in which the institution revealed that Arab countries had lost a total of $620 billion during the invasion of Kuwait. $84 billion alone were direct payments from Saudi Arabia, Kuwait and the Gulf Emirates, to the United States, Britain and France, regarding military expenses.

In June 2010, the AMF granted a $76 million loan to Jordan to undertake key financial reforms. In December 2010, the AMF granted a $200 million loan to Yemen to support economic restructuring programs. $800 million had been granted to Yemen to this date. In September 2012, the AMF granted a $127 million loan to Morocco to help the country cope with the rising prices of food.

In March 2014, Abdulrahman bin Abdullah al Hamidy, former head of Saudi Arabia's central bank, was appointed director general and chairman of the board of the Arab Monetary Fund.

In April 2015, the World Bank Group and the Arab Monetary Fund signed a partnership for enhanced cooperation in the MENA region.

In May 2016, the Arab Monetary Fund called for central banks increase their commitments to Islamic finance, pressing them to use Sharia-compliant tools to manage their short-term financial obligations.

In May 2017, the Arab Monetary Fund loaned $332 million to the Egyptian government to make up for the decline of tourism in the country. In April 2018, the AMF announced its intention to create its own independent regional entity for the clearing and settlement of intra-Arab payments.

The AMF initiated the Arab Regional Payment System (ARPS) in 2018, with aim of supportingeconomic and financial integration between Arab countries and expanding trade and investment activities with their global trading partners. The Buna foreign-exchange (FX) settlement service, as it was known from 2020, first went live on 6 November 2023, when its PvP functionality was used by Abu Dhabi Commercial Bank (ADCB) and Jordan Ahli Bank. This initial service supported FX transactions in any pair of six currencies: four regional currencies, the Emirati dirham (AED), Egyptian pound (EGP), Jordanian dinar (JOD) and Saudi riyal (SAR), and two global currencies, the euro (EUR) and US dollar (USD).

In November 2023, Fahad M. Alturki, former Vice-President of the King Abdullah Petroleum Studies and Research Center (KAPSARC), was appointed director general and chairman of the board of the Arab Monetary Fund.

== Objectives ==
The Arab Monetary Fund's main objectives are to correct and balance the payment of its member states, remove payment restrictions between members, improve Arab monetary cooperation, encourage the development of Arab financial markets (paving the way for a unified Arab currency), and to facilitate and promote trade between member states.

The Articles of Agreement define the Fund's aims as follows:

- Correct disequilibria in the balance of payments of member states;
- Promote the stability of exchange rates among Arab currencies, to render them mutually convertible, and to eliminate restrictions on current payments between member states;
- Establish policies and modes of monetary co-operation to accelerate Arab economic development in the member states;
- Tender advice on the investment of member states' financial resources in foreign markets, whenever called upon to do so;
- Promote the development of Arab financial markets;
- Promote the use of the Arab dinar as a unit of account and to pave the way for the creation of a unified Arab currency;
- Coordinate the positions of member states in dealing with international monetary and economic problems;
- Provide a mechanism for the settlement of current payments between member states in order to promote trade among them.

== Organization structure ==
The principal organs of the AMF are the Board of Governors, the Board of Executive Directors, and the Director-General. The Board of Governors (General Assembly) are the highest authority responsible for formulating policies on Arab economic integration and liberalization of trade amongst residing member states. In the Board of Governors, each member state is represented by an appointed Governor and Deputy Governor whom serve five-year terms. The Board of Executive Directors is composed of eight non-resident directors elected by the Board of Governors on renewable three-year terms that is chaired by the Director-General. The Director-General is also appointed to the board but hold five-year term limits. The Director-General holds the position of Managing Director of the AMF.

The organization distributes its work through various offices (IA), departments, committees, and divisions. The Director-General supervises a committee dedicated to loans and another dedicated to investments in order to be able to make recommendations on loan and investment policies to the Board of Executive Director. In addition this person is responsible for conducting and submitting an Annual Report to the Board of Governors.

== Location and members ==
Members of the Arab Monetary Fund, coextensive with the Arab League

The AMF's headquarters is in the city of Abu Dhabi, the capital of the United Arab Emirates.

All member states of the Arab League are also members of the Arab Monetary Fund.

== See also ==
- Buna (payment system)
- Arab League
- Arab World
- Council of Arab Economic Unity (CAEU)
- List of Arab organizations
