= Association of Arab and European Universities =

Educational organization

- Abbreviation: AEUA
- Formation: 1998 (under Dutch law in 2000)
- Type: NGO
- Legal status: Association
- Purpose: Educational
- Headquarters: The Hague, Netherlands
- Region served: Arab and European countries
- Members: Arab and European universities
- Official language: Arabic/English
- Website: www.aeua.net

The Association of Arab and European Universities (AEUA) is a university association based in The Hague, Netherlands.

The AEAU encourages links between European and Arab universities. It was established in 1998 by the Lutfia Rabbani Foundation with the main objective if aiding collaboration between universities in Arab and European countries at the university, faculty, and departmental levels. Ultimate goal is to develop human resources and promote understanding between cultures and exchanges between the civil societies involved. In 2000, the AEUA was incorporated formally under Dutch law with support from the Association of Arab Universities located in Amman, Jordan and the European University Association located in Brussels, Belgium. Both these organizations have representatives on the Board of the AEUA.

== See also ==
- Arab League
- Arab world
- Association of Arab Universities (AARU)
- European University Association (EUA)
- List of Arab organizations
