= List of Arab companies =

List of companies in the Arab world

This is a list of companies based in the Arab world by country:

- Algeria
- Bahrain
- Comoros
- Djibouti
- Egypt
- Iraq
- Jordan
- Kuwait
- Lebanon
- Libya
- Mauritania
- Morocco
- Oman
- Qatar
- Saudi Arabia
- Somalia
- Sudan
- Syria
- Tunisia
- United Arab Emirates
- Yemen

== Largest arab companies ==
The following is a list of companies based in the Arab World having the greatest market capitalization. This list is based on the Forbes Middle East Top 100 rankings. All figures are in USD billions.

Rank	Company	Sector	Assets	Market value	Country
1	SABIC	Petrochemicals	84.5	80.7	Saudi Arabia
2	QNB Group	Banking	197.7	37.7	Qatar
3	First Abu Dhabi Bank	Banking	182.5	33.7	United Arab Emirates
4	National Commercial Bank	Banking	117.7	20.7	Saudi Arabia
5	Etisalat	Telecommunications	33.4	43.1	United Arab Emirates
6	Al-Rajhi Bank	Banking	90.6	27.7	Saudi Arabia
7	Emirates NBD	Banking	122	13.1	United Arab Emirates
8	Saudi Electricity Company	Electric utility	107.4	26.7	Saudi Arabia
9	Saudi Telecom Company	Telecommunications	27.1	37.5	Saudi Arabia
10	National Bank of Kuwait	Banking	79.4	13.4	Kuwait

== See also ==
- List of Arab organizations
- Lists of companies
