= List of former accounting firms =

This is a list of former accounting firms.

== United Kingdom ==
A

- Arthur Young & Co.

B

- Binder Hamlyn

C

- Coopers & Lybrand

D

- Deloitte Haskins & Sells

E

- Ernst & Ernst
- Ernst & Whinney

N

- Numerica

P

- Peat, Marwick, Mitchell & Company
- Price Waterhouse

R

- RSM Bentley Jennison
- RSM Robson Rhodes
- RSM Tenon

T

- Touche Ross

V

- Vantis

W

- William Barclay Peat & Co.

== United States ==
A

- Arthur Andersen

B

- Beard Miller Company

H

- Haskins & Sells
