= European University Association =

Association and interest group of universities in Europe

- Formation: 2001; 25 years ago
- Headquarters: Brussels, Belgium
- President: Josep M. Garrell (Term of office: 2023–2027)
- Vice-President: Paul Boyle
- Vice-President: Ivanka Popović
- Website: eua.eu

The European University Association (EUA) represents more than 800 institutions of higher education in 48 countries, providing them with a forum for cooperation and the exchange of information on higher education and research policies. Members of the Association are European universities involved in teaching and research, national associations of rectors, and other organisations active in higher education and research.

EUA is the result of a merger between the Association of European Universities and the Confederation of European Union Rectors' Conferences. The merger took place in Salamanca on 31 March 2001.

== Membership ==
The following is a breakdown of EUA membership between EU and other countries:

Location	Members
European Union	582
United Kingdom	60
Turkey	57
Ukraine	27
Norway	17
Switzerland	17
Kazakhstan	14
Russia	12 – suspended
Bosnia and Herzegovina	7
North Macedonia	7
Georgia	6
Serbia	4
Iceland	4
Belarus	3
Albania	3
Armenia	2
Azerbaijan	2
Moldova	2
Vatican City	1
Montenegro	1
Andorra	1
Liechtenstein	1

Some universities in Kosovo are listed as "Individual Full Members" or "Individual Associate Members".

In March 2022, the EUA suspended 12 Russian members following the 2022 address of the Russian Union of Rectors (RUR) supporting the 2022 Russian invasion of Ukraine, for being "diametrically opposed to the European values that they committed to when joining EUA".

In 2025, EUA welcomed 22 new members and two new affiliates.

== See also ==
- Agence universitaire de la Francophonie (AUF)
- Association of African Universities
- Association of Arab and European Universities (AEUA)
- Association of Commonwealth Universities
- Association of Pacific Rim Universities
- EURODOC
- European Association for International Education
- European Association for Quality Assurance in Higher Education
- European Association of Institutions in Higher Education (EURASHE)
- European Students' Union
- European University Information Systems
- Independent European Universities
