= Downtown Fort William, Ontario =

Coordinates: 48°22′56″N 89°14′46″W

Downtown Fort William
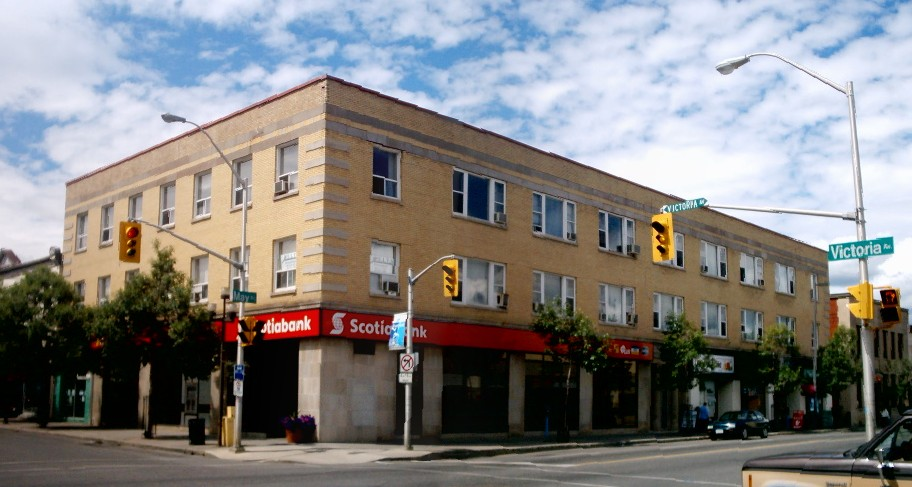
- Cuthbertson Block built 1908
Population; 2,000	Ward; McKellar and Westfort wards
- Location in Thunder Bay

Downtown Fort William, also known as Downtown Thunder Bay South or the South Core, is the urban core of the former city of Fort William, the southern half of Thunder Bay, Ontario. It is centred on Victoriaville Civic Centre, an indoor shopping mall and civic centre built as part of an urban renewal project in the 1980s. It is separated from the Kaministiquia River by the Canadian Pacific Railway line, and its topography is relatively flat.

Downtown Fort William is the location of Thunder Bay City Hall, and numerous other government offices.

== History ==
Downtown Fort William is one of the three nodes around which urban growth began in the Lakehead area. In 1883 the Canadian government transferred responsibility for the Transcontinental railway to the private Canadian Pacific Railway, which subsequently relocated the Lake Superior terminus from the Fort William Town Plot (West Fort William) to the lower Kaministiquia River, seven kilometres downstream from Westfort. Growth began at the intersection of Victoria Avenue and Simpson Street, because the McVicar family had negotiated an agreement with the CPR to place the railway station on the McVicar patent, and because the CPR had erected its second and third Thunder Bay grain elevators (CPR Elevators A & B) at the foot of Victoria Avenue in 1884/85 and 1888. In 1891 the Municipality of Neebing acquired land from the McKellar family and began construction of a town hall on Donald Street which, when Fort William was incorporated in 1892, became the town hall of Fort William. Due to Port Arthur's lack of a city hall, it became the location of Thunder Bay City Hall after the amalgamation of the two cities in 1970. Victoriaville Civic Centre was completed in 1980 and replaced the intersection of Victoria and Syndicate Avenues. However, due to the age of the structure and the loss of $500,000 per year on the mall, council voted to demolish it in October 2020. Demolition started in August 2025, and will include reopening Victoria Avenue between Brodie and McKellar Streets, and construction of a new plaza along the Syndicate Avenue alignment between Victoria and Justice Avenues.

== Demographics ==
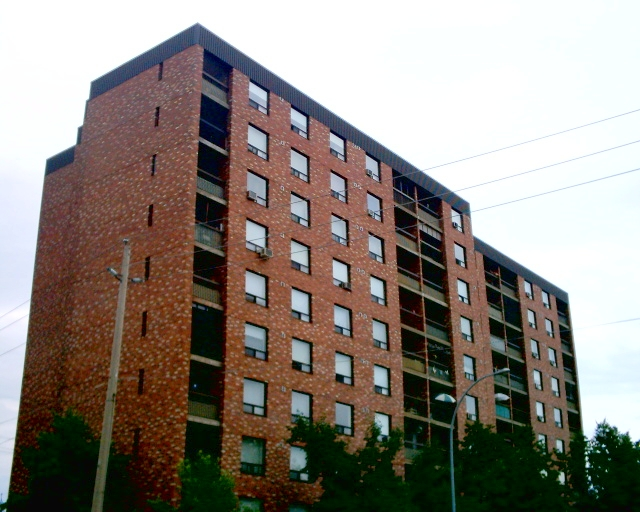
Paterson Court

The downtown area has a population of approximately 1,000 and a median age of approximately 47 years. The south core has a larger aboriginal population than much of the rest of the city, and the lowest average income in Thunder Bay. The south core is the location of several apartment buildings aimed to low income individuals and seniors. It also has a relatively large homeless contingent and is the location of the Rotary Shelter House. The John Howard Society, an organization dedicated to assist people who have come into conflict with the law, is located in the old YMCA building.

Crime is recognized to be a problem in the south core, especially near the Brodie Street bus terminal. Thunder Bay Police operates the McKellar Neighbourhood Policing Office across the street from the bus terminal and has cruisers drive by on a regular basis.

== Economy ==
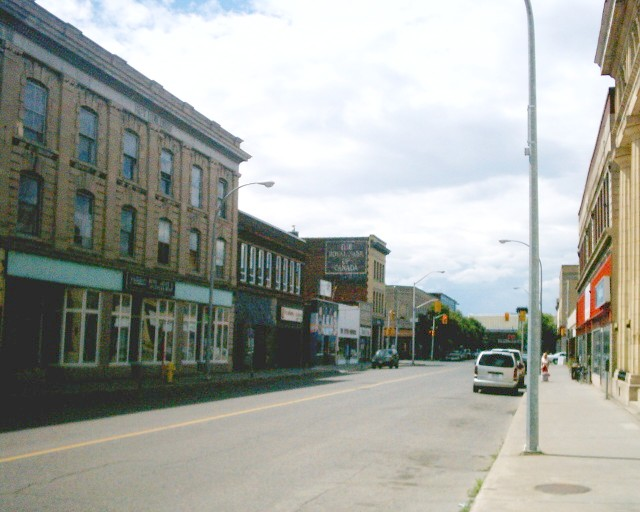
Victoria Avenue East

Neither of Thunder Bay's downtown cores overshadowed the other, and both are today less important economically than the Intercity area. However, the South Core continues to be an employment centre. Several thousand people work in the core every day. The core is home to branches of four of Canada's five major banks, and several credit unions.

Several industrial businesses are located in the neighbourhood, primarily on the eastern side of the neighbourhood, and the Canadian Pacific Train Station is located in the southernmost part of the neighbourhood.

== Arts and culture ==
Downtown Fort William is the location of many cultural institutions. The Thunder Bay Historical Museum occupies the renovated Fort William police station on Donald Street, one of the core's many historical landmarks. It is operated by the century-old Thunder Bay Historical Museum Society and has three floors of galleries, including a jail cell and recreation of a Fort William street from the early 20th century. Also located off Donald Street is the Brodie Street Art Gallery, which showcases local artists and offers watercolour lessons by local painter Peter Humeniuk.

Brodie Resource Library is located on Brodie Street beside city hall. It was opened in 1912 as Fort William's Carnegie Library.

The CBC's Thunder Bay studio is located on Miles Street on the former site of St Joseph's Convent. facing the former St Stanislaus school. It is the broadcasting centre for CBQ and CBQT. A webcam is mounted on top of its broadcasting antenna, and looks out over the Simpson-Ogden neighbourhood.

=== Places of worship ===
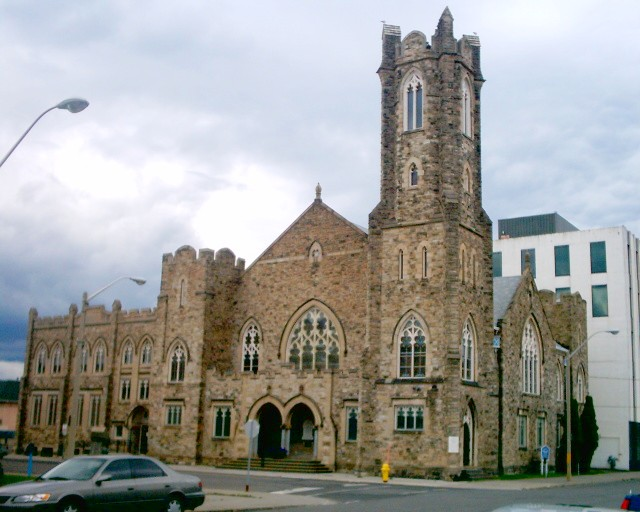
St. Andrews Presbyterian

Several churches are located in the core, the most prominent being St. Andrews Presbyterian Church, located at the corner of Brodie and Donald Streets. A city-designated heritage property, it was designed in 1909 by Stinson and Hood architects in the Gothic Revival style. It features a covered entrance supported by granite columns with floral capitals, a unique feature in Thunder Bay, and its bell tower dominates the area's skyline. St Patrick's Cathedral, the episcopal seat of the Roman Catholic Diocese of Thunder Bay, was built in 1963 at the corner of Donald and Archibald streets. Other prominent churches include St. Paul's Anglican Church at the corner of Ridgeway and Archibald, St. Andrew's Church, and Wesley United Church at the corner of Brodie and Miles streets, across from the Brodie Street bus terminal and Paterson Park.

== Sports and recreation ==
The Northwestern Ontario Sports Hall of Fame is located in the south core on May Street, beside city hall. The Fort William Gardens is located at the corner of Vickers and Miles streets, and is a 4,700 seat arena.

== Parks ==
There are many parks and parkettes in the south core, the most notable is Paterson Park, located on the former site of the Fort William Central School on May Street between Miles and Leith streets. The park was named after Norman M. Paterson, a Senator and founder of Paterson GlobalFoods. The park features a fountain and benches on an artificial hill. Located along the Kaministiquia River is the Kaministiquia River Heritage Park, which features a Via Rail train display, a restored Tugboat, a boardwalk, and a stainless steel sculpture titled "Animikie", which is Ojibwe for "thunder bird".

== Education ==
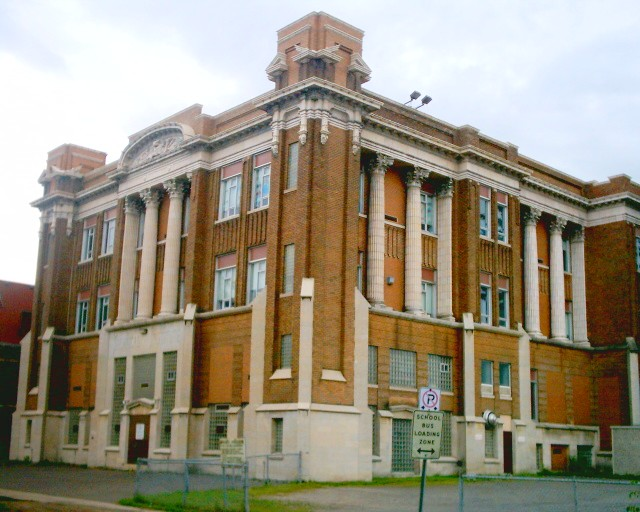
Fort William Collegiate Institute

Many schools were located in the downtown area, but as the population aged and the number of families decreased, most were closed. The only school operating in the core today is McKellar Park Central School, which has classes from Kindergarten to grade 8 and was ranked by the Frasier Institute as the worst in Thunder Bay in 2008. St. Stanislaus School was a Catholic school located at the corner of Miles and North streets. It is now an office building. Fort William Central School (built 1895) was located at the corner of Miles and May streets, and was demolished in the late 1950s for Paterson Park. Fort William Collegiate Institute was a secondary school located just south of the core which closed in 2005. Plans are underway to convert the building to residential uses. A branch of the Sylvan Learning Centre is located on Victoria Avenue.

== Infrastructure ==
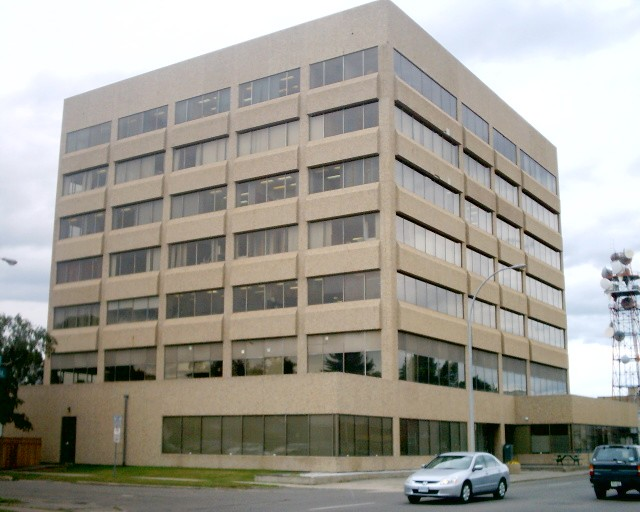
The Spence Clinic

The street layout in Downtown Fort William is based on a grid, which is interrupted at several points by Victoriaville Mall, Paterson Park and the former McKellar General Hospital.

Thunder Bay Transit operates a bus terminal in the core. Routes that use the terminal include 1 Mainline, 3M Memorial, 4 Neebing (limited), 8 James, 10 Northwood, 12 East End, 14 Arthur, 16 Balmoral, and 18 Westfort. During peak hours, bus frequency in the core is every 15 minutes.

Medical facilities in the core include St. Joseph's Care Group in Victoriaville Civic Centre, the Ridgeway Clinic, the Fort William Clinic, and the Spence Clinic. The Mayo Clinic has an office in Spence Clinic where local residents can receive information about the Mayo Clinic and schedule appointments.

== Photo gallery ==
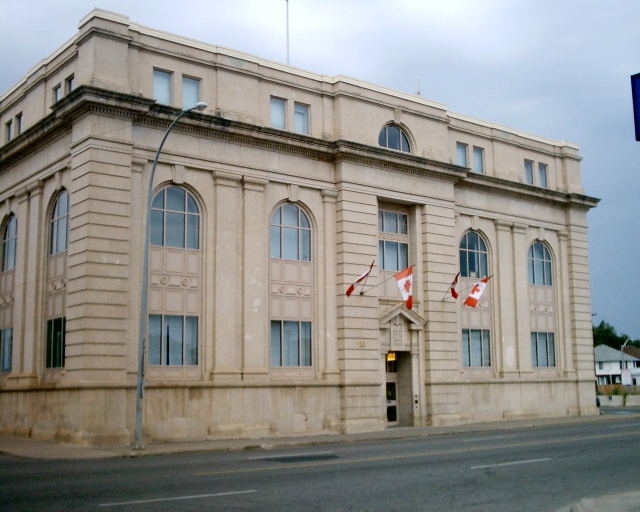
Government of Canada offices at the corner of May and Leith, an example of Beaux-Arts Classicism. Constructed in 1913 of limestone, its architectural elements have been reduced to their bare essentials, representing a movement toward modern classicism.

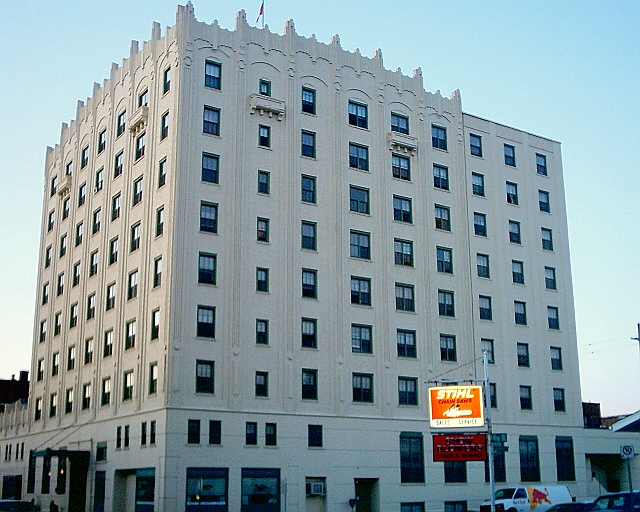
Built in 1928 as the Royal Edward Hotel, the eight-storey Royal Edward Arms is the oldest "highrise" in Fort William and was designed by Dorr & Dorr architects of Minneapolis. The upper reaches of the building is decorated with an Art Deco stylization of Gothic ornamentation. Today the building is used for low income housing, but during its heyday hosted many famous individuals, including Her Majesty Queen Elizabeth II.

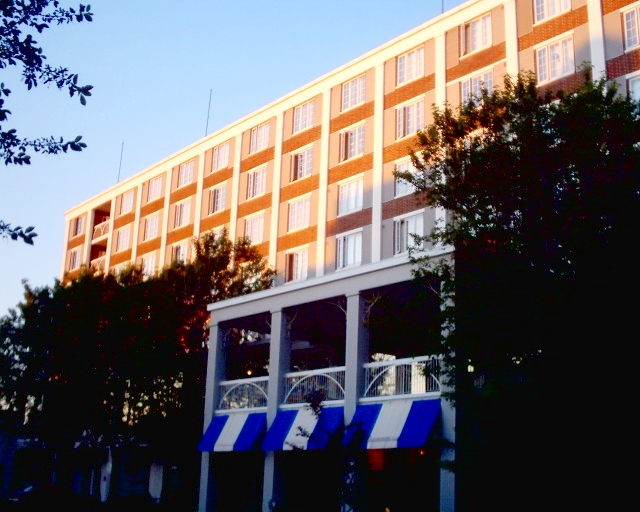
Independent Living Resource Centre Thunder Bay at 130 South Brodie Street. ILRC Thunder Bay is located in the core of downtown Fort William. Originally built as a Holiday Inn hotel, today this building houses the ILRC, a non-profit organization that delivers programs and services to all persons with disabilities and the community, as well as several condominium units.

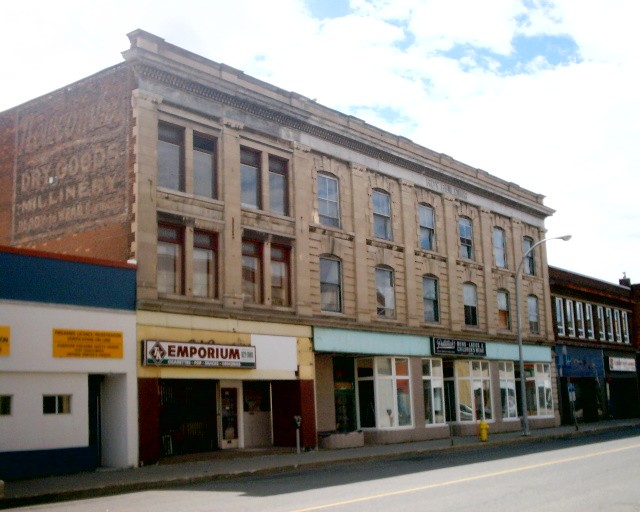
The Roy Building, designed for John King by Stinson and Hood architects and built in 1908 on Victoria Avenue, was once a Zellers department store. It was recently restored in 2015.

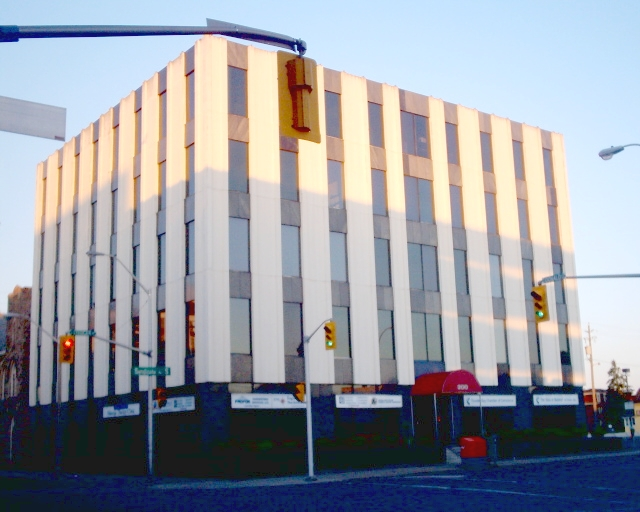
This building at the corner of Syndicate and Donald streets is home to the Thunder Bay Chamber of Commerce, among other businesses.

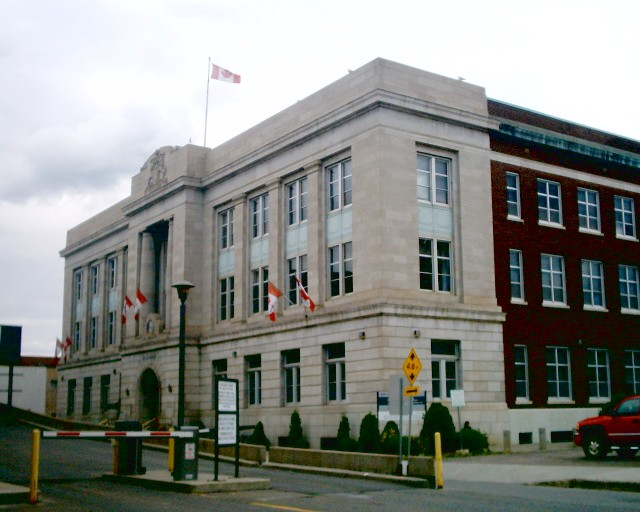
The Canada Revenue Agency offices at 130 South Syndicate Avenue, across from the Victoriaville parkade. Designed by T. W. Fuller and built in 1935 this building served as Fort Williams second post office.
