= List of companies that switched industries =

In rare cases, a company that started in one industry may, due to bankruptcy or a change in market conditions, re-emerge with the same name but in a completely different industry. The following companies are notable examples.

- Berkshire Hathaway from textile manufacturing to diversified holdings
- Coleco from leather supplies to electronics manufacturing
- Hudson's Bay Company from the fur trade to retail
- ITT Corporation from telecommunications to engineering and manufacturing
- Nintendo from playing cards to video games
- Nokia from paper and cardboard products, to rubber tires, industrial rubber parts, raincoat and footwear, and then to mobile telephone manufacturing
- Preussag from mining and heavy industry to tourism
- Reading Company from rail transport to movie theaters
- Tandy Corporation from leather supplies to electronics retail
- WPP Group from manufacture of wire baskets to advertising
- Zapata Corporation from energy exploration to fish protein
