= List of largest companies in Taiwan =

This article lists the largest companies in Taiwan in terms of their revenue, net profit and total assets, according to the American business magazines Fortune and Forbes.

== 2025 Fortune list ==
This list displays all 6 Taiwanese companies in the Fortune Global 500, which ranks the world's largest companies by annual revenue. The figures below are given in millions of US dollars and are for the fiscal year 2024. Also listed are the headquarters location, net profit, number of employees worldwide and industry sector of each company.

Rank	Fortune 500 rank	Name	Industry	Revenue (USD millions)	Profits (USD millions)	Employees	Headquarters
1	28	Hon Hai Precision Industry	Electronics	213,699	4,757	633,167	New Taipei City
2	126	Taiwan Semiconductor Manufacturing	Semiconductor	90,167	36,087	83,825	Hsinchu
3	348	Quanta Computer	Electronics	43,950	1,860	65,926	Taoyuan
4	461	Pegatron	Electronics	35,058	526	98,202	Taipei
5	494	CPC Corporation	Oil and Gas	32,769	-1,028	16,637	Kaohsiung
6	496	Wistron	Electronics	32,687	543	42,091	Taipei

== 2021 Forbes list ==
This list is based on the Forbes Global 2000, which ranks the world's 2,000 largest publicly traded companies. The Forbes list takes into account a multitude of factors, including the revenue, net profit, total assets and market value of each company; each factor is given a weighted rank in terms of importance when considering the overall ranking. The table below also lists the headquarters location and industry sector of each company. The figures are in billions of US dollars and are for the year 2020. All 43 companies from Taiwan in the Forbes 2000 are listed.

Rank	Forbes 2000 rank	Name	Headquarters	Revenue (billions US$)	Profit (billions US$)	Assets (billions US$)	Value (billions US$)	Industry
1	66	Taiwan Semiconductor Manufacturing	Hsinchu	48.1	18.7	98.3	558.1	Semiconductor
2	94	Hon Hai Precision Industry	New Taipei City	182.0	3.5	130.8	60.4	Electronics
3	209	Cathay Financial Holding	Taipei	37.9	2.5	389.4	23.2	Banking
4	211	Fubon Financial Holding Co.	Taipei	35.2	3.1	328.4	21.7	Insurance
5	395	CTBC Financial Holding	Taipei	13.4	1.5	235.5	15.3	Finance
6	543	MediaTek	Hsinchu	10.9	1.4	19.0	54.4	Semiconductor
7	615	Nan Ya Plastics	Taipei	10.3	1.5	20.8	25.2	Chemicals
8	632	Quanta Computer	Taoyuan	37.0	0.9	23.6	13.3	Electronics
9	671	ASE Group	Kaohsiung	16.2	0.9	20.8	17.1	Semiconductor
10	687	Formosa Petrochemical	Mailiao	14.1	1.0	13.6	34.3	Oil and Gas
11	758	Chunghwa Telecom	Taipei	7.1	1.1	18.0	31.2	Telecommunication
12	771	Shin Kong Financial	Taipei	17.1	0.5	155.1	4.4	Insurance
13	777	Mega Financial Holding	Taipei	2.8	0.8	137.2	15.4	Finance
14	788	Formosa Plastics Corp	Kaohsiung	7.1	1.2	17.1	24.5	Chemicals
15	794	Uni-President Enterprises	Tainan	15.2	0.7	17.6	14.7	Food processing
16	813	Pegatron	Taipei	47.5	0.7	24.4	6.9	Electronics
17	851	Delta Electronics	Taipei	9.6	0.9	12.0	27.2	Electronics
18	852	KGI Life Insurance	Taipei	12.1	0.5	79.0	4.3	Insurance
19	866	KGI Financial	Taipei	12.4	0.4	122.2	5.9	Finance
20	878	Formosa Chemicals	Taipei	8.6	0.7	18.9	19.0	Chemicals
21	918	Yuanta Financial Holding	Taipei	4.7	0.8	98.2	10.6	Finance
22	965	E.SUN Commercial Bank	Taipei	2.3	0.6	105.8	12.0	Banking
23	999	Asus	Taipei	14.0	0.9	14.1	10.2	Electronics
23	999	United Microelectronics	Hsinchu	6.0	1.0	13.4	23.7	Semiconductor
24	1042	First Financial Holding	Taipei	2.9	0.6	126.4	10.3	Banking
25	1052	Taiwan Cooperative Bank	Taipei	3.9	0.6	147.6	10.0	Banking
26	1098	China Steel	Kaohsiung	10.7	0.0	22.6	19.1	Steel
27	1287	Evergreen	Taoyuan	7.0	0.8	11.9	11.7	Transportation
28	1314	Compal Electronics	Taipei	35.6	0.3	16.6	4.2	Electronics
29	1327	Taishin Financial Holdings	Taipei	2.0	0.5	78.2	5.3	Finance
30	1386	Shanghai Commercial and Savings Bank	Taipei	1.8	0.5	75.2	6.7	Banking
31	1424	Bank SinoPac	Taipei	1.8	0.4	76.3	5.2	Banking
32	1441	Wistron	Hsinchu	28.7	0.3	15.3	3.3	Electronics
33	1445	Largan Precision	Taichung	1.9	0.8	6.1	14.9	Electronics
34	1532	Hotai Motor	Taipei	7.8	0.5	10.3	11.4	Automotive
35	1536	Hua Nan Financial	Taipei	2.3	0.3	110.4	8.7	Finance
36	1538	Chailease Holding	Taipei	2.0	0.6	21.1	10.2	Finance
37	1575	Mercuries & Associates	Taipei	6.6	0.0	48.6	0.7	Retail
38	1637	Taiwan Cement	Taipei	3.9	0.9	13.9	10.2	Construction materials
39	1752	Chang Hwa Bank	Taichung	1.3	0.2	82.3	6.5	Banking
40	1760	WPG Holdings	Taipei	20.7	0.3	8.3	2.8	Electronics
41	1827	President Chain Store	Taipei	8.8	0.3	7.5	10.1	Retail
42	1848	Taiwan Business Bank	Taipei	1.1	0.2	63.8	2.6	Banking
43	1857	Inventec	Taipei	17.3	0.3	7.6	3.4	Electronics
44	1976	Far Eastern New Century	Taipei	7.0	0.3	22.0	6.0	Conglomerate

== See also ==
- Economy of Taiwan
- List of companies of Taiwan
- List of largest companies by revenue
