= Fawakih =

Fawakih is an educational non profit that focuses on teaching Classical Arabic to students throughout the United States for the purpose of accessing the Quran, Hadith and classical texts of the Islamic Sciences.

Fawakih (Arabic: فواكه) derives its name from the Arabic word for fruits, representing the desired result of tasting the "fruits" of understanding the Classical Arabic Islamic texts.

== History ==
Fawakih was founded in 2007 by Saif Omar as a 501(c)(3) organization under the legal entity Polaris Foundation Inc. Fawakih held its first Quranic Arabic summer intensive in Fishers, IN subsequently held programs in future years in Washington, DC and Boston, MA. After 2010, all summer programs were offered in Washington, DC. Starting in the fall of 2012, Fawakih began to offer part-time, weekly, Quranic Arabic classes in Herndon, VA, Ann Arbor, MI, and Boston, MA. By 2015, Fawakih offered classes throughout the East Coast and in the Chicago Metropolitan area. Fawakih has expanded its offerings to include part-time courses online, a winter classical language learning intensive, and a number of seminars that focus on the exegesis of the Quran. Currently, Fawakih's headquarters is based in Northern Virginia and is led by Executive Director Ismail ibn Ali.

== Curriculum ==
Fawakih has developed a 6-level curriculum that focus on three main components: grammar, text analysis and skills. Students are expected to

- develop a strong foundation in the theory of Arabic grammar, morphology and rhetoric.
- apply theory primarily through reading texts in Classical Arabic, including the Quran.
- utilize a broad vocabulary of words found in the Quran and other texts

Fawakih has developed a series of Quran Analysis textbooks which focus on helping students parse verses of the Quran and read extracts of various Quran exegetes. The series includes textbooks for Surat al-Kahf, Surat Maryam, and Surat Yasin.
