= Nicholas Heath (director) =

British opera director (born 1959)

Nicholas Heath (born 1959) is a British opera director.

Heath was born in London. His father, cellist Kenneth Heath, helped found the Academy of St Martin in the Fields chamber orchestra. His grandfather was the Welsh composer and physician John Rippiner Heath.

Having trained as a potter at Middlesex Polytechnic, Nicholas Heath embarked on a career in singing. What started at the Montepulciano Arts Festival in Italy led eventually to a full-time contract at the Royal Opera House Covent Garden in 1993.

He formed Opera a la Carte in 1993 and started directing for the company in 1995. He has directed music theatre to grand opera. In 2002 he was awarded 5 stars for his Tango Barber of Seville by The Times and in 2004 directed the première of Call Me Ishmael based on Melville’s Moby Dick in Amsterdam.

Since 2004 he has regularly lectured in Opera Studies at Birkbeck, University of London and since 2018 at the City Literary Institute. He left the Royal Opera House in 2006 to work with homeless people in a project run by Streetwise Opera, to participate in the Clore Cultural Leadership Programme and to devote more time to Opera a la Carte.

Since 2007 he has designed and run masterclasses at many festivals including the Bermuda Festival, the Ealing Festival and the Harwich Festival.

He formed Regents Opera in 2012, which merged with Fulham Opera in 2020. He now sits on its board as Founder of the company.

In 2022 he directed the production of Dido & Aeneas in the Keble Early Music Festival.

== Sources ==
- Call Me Ishmael
