= List of opera companies in Africa and the Middle East =

This inclusive list of opera companies in Africa and the Middle East contains opera companies with entries in the Wikipedia plus other particularly noted companies based in these regions. For opera companies from other continents, see List of important opera companies.

== Opera Companies in Africa ==
=== Egypt ===
Name of opera company	Principal theatre	Principal location
Cairo Opera House		Cairo

=== Nigeria ===
Name of opera company	Principal theatre	Principal location
Operabuja		Abuja

=== South Africa ===
Name of opera company	Principal theatre	Principal location
Cape Town Opera		Cape Town
State Theatre		Pretoria

== Opera Companies in the Middle East ==
=== Israel ===
Name of opera company	Principal theatre	Principal location
Israeli Opera	Tel Aviv Performing Arts Center	Tel Aviv

=== Oman ===
Name of opera company	Principal theatre	Principal location
Royal Opera Muscat	Royal Opera House Muscat	Muscat

=== Syria ===
Name of opera company	Principal theatre	Principal location
Damascus Opera House		Damascus
