= Association of Arab Universities =

Organization of universities in the Arab world

Association of Arab Universities (إتحاد الجامعات العربية)
- Abbreviation: AARU
- Formation: 1964
- Type: NGO
- Legal status: Association
- Purpose: Educational
- Headquarters: Amman, Jordan
- Region served: Arab League
- Members: Universities, higher education associations with Arabic as an official language of study
- Official language: Arabic
- Main organ: General Assembly
- Website: www.aaru.edu.jo

The Association of Arab Universities (Arabic: إتحاد الجامعات العربية), also called the Union of Arab Universities (Arabic: تحاد الجامعات العربية), is an organization working within the framework of the Arab League. It is based in Amman, Jordan. The objective of the organization is to support and connect universities in the Arab world, and to enhance cooperation among them.

== Members ==
Universities that are members (280) in the AARU are from the following 22 countries:

- Algeria
- Bahrain
- Egypt
- Iraq
- Jordan
- Kuwait
- Lebanon
- Libya
- Mauritania
- Morocco
- Oman
- Palestine
- Qatar
- Saudi Arabia
- Somalia
- Sudan
- Syria
- Tunisia
- United Arab Emirates
- Yemen

== See also ==
- Association of Arab and European Universities
