= List of defunct network processor companies =

During the dot-com/internet bubble of the late 1990s and early 2000, the proliferation of many dot-com start-up companies created a secondary bubble in the telecommunications/computer networking infrastructure and telecommunications service provider markets. Venture capital and high tech companies rushed to build next generation infrastructure equipment for the expected explosion of internet traffic.

It has been estimated that dozens of start-up companies were created in the race to build the processors that would be a component of the next generation telecommunications equipment. Once the internet investment bubble burst, the telecom network upgrade cycle was deferred for years (perhaps for a decade). As a result, the majority of these new companies went bankrupt.

As of the mid‑2020s, significant shipments of network processors are being made by major players such as Cisco Systems, Broadcom, Marvell Technology Group (which now includes Cavium Inc.), Intel Corporation, and Qualcomm Technologies.

== OC-768/40Gb routing ==
- ClearSpeed – left network processor market, reverted to supercomputing applications
- Propulsion Networks – defunct
- BOPS – left network processor market, reverted to DSP applications

== OC-192/10Gb routing ==
- Terago – defunct
- Clearwater Networks – originally named Xstream Logic, defunct
- Silicon Access – defunct
- Solidum Systems – acquired by Integrated Device Technology
- Lexra – defunct
- Fast-Chip – defunct
- Cognigine Corp. – defunct
- Internet Machines – morphed into IMC Semiconductors, a PCI-Express chip vendor
- Acorn Networks – defunct
- XaQti – acquired by Vitesse Semiconductor, product line discontinued

== OC-48/2.5Gb routing ==
- IP Semiconductors – defunct
- Entridia – defunct
- Stargate Solutions – defunct

== Gigabit Ethernet routing ==
- Sibyte – acquired by Broadcom, product line discontinued
- PMC-Sierra – product line discontinued

== OC-12 routing ==
- C-port – acquired by Motorola (now Freescale), product line discontinued
- IBM – PowerNP product line discontinued
- Sitera – acquired by Vitesse, product line discontinued

== Access products ==
- Netargy – defunct
- Ishoni Networks – defunct
- HyWire – defunct

== VOIP products ==
- Silicon Spice – acquired by Broadcom, product line discontinued
- Malleable Technologies – acquired by PMC-Sierra, product line discontinued

== Traffic managers ==
- Extreme Packet Devices – acquired by PMC-Sierra, product line discontinued
- Azanda Network Devices – acquired by Cortina, product line being sold as CS53xx family
- Teradiant – defunct
- Orologic – acquired by Vitesse, product line discontinued
- Maker Communications – acquired by Conexant, product line discontinued

== Packet classifiers ==
- SwitchOn – acquired by PMC-Sierra, product line discontinued
- FastChip – defunct

== Switch fabrics ==
- Abrizio – acquired by PMC-Sierra, product line discontinued
- Stargen – left networking market for computer server market

== Security products ==
- Chrysalis-ITS – defunct
