= Pan Am (2026) =

Planned airline of the United States

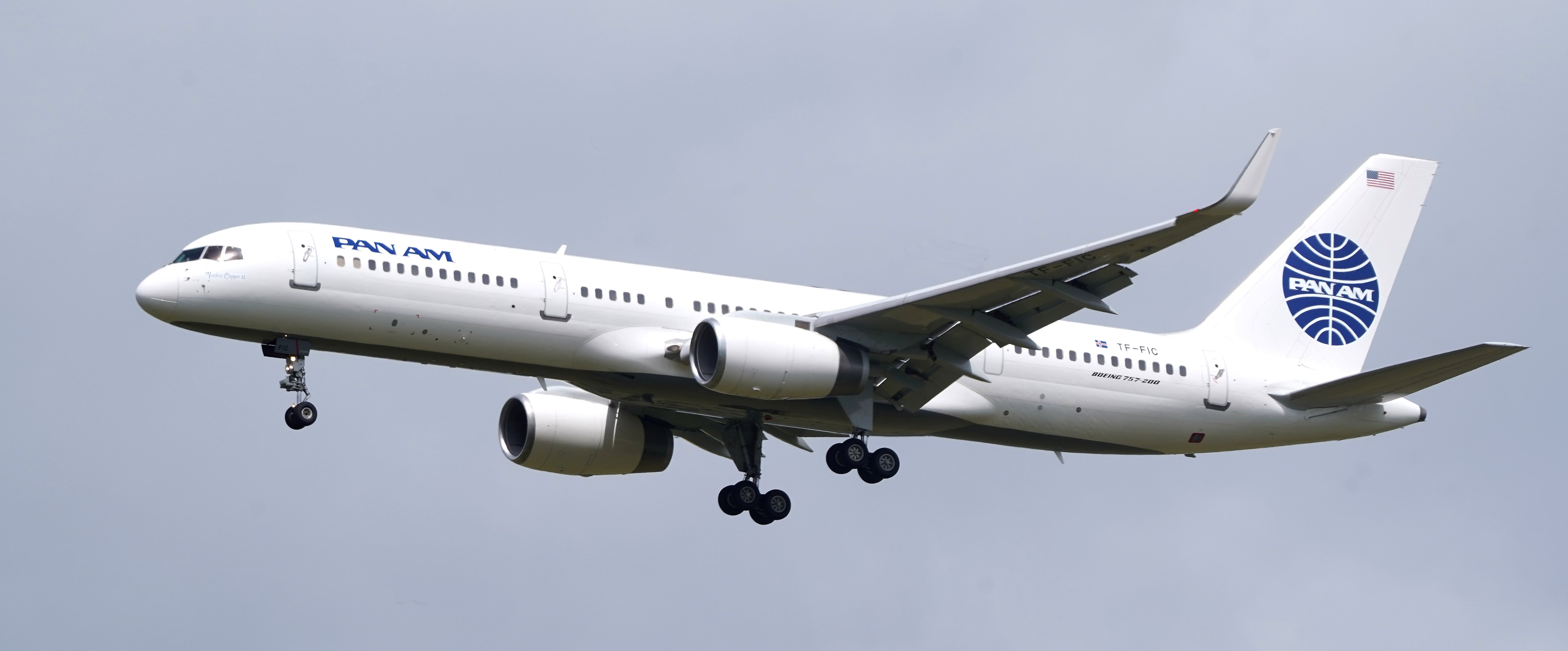
- A Pan Am Boeing 757-200 chartered and leased from Icelandair
- Founded: 2025; 1 year ago
- Hubs: Miami International Airport
- Founders: Craig Carter; Ed Wegel
- Website: www.panam.com

Pan Am is a planned airline in the United States that will go under the name that several other airlines have tried to use. Its main hub will be in Miami, positioning itself as a "smart carrier" based out of Miami.

The trademark for the airline name was bought in February 2024 by Craig Carter and a group of investors for an undisclosed sum.

The airline in 2025 would then charter out a Boeing 757 owned by the airline Icelandair for 12 days and would then fly it to historical Pan Am destinations.

The airline announced close to the end of 2025 that it would be utilizing the Airbus A320 NEO as the original Pan Am had Airbus A320 aircraft on order before it was bankrupt, a total of 50 aircraft which was sold to Northwest Airlines.

On December 12, 2025 Pan Am signed an agreement with Avengers Flight Group to conduct flight simulator training for its employees.

It has been hinted that Pan Am could operate 15 to 20 widebodies but there is no clear timeline for the event. The airline's co-founder said that he identified the Airbus A220 as the aircraft of choice. Pan Am is also expected to be a lifestyle brand along with airline operations. In 2027 the first Pan Am hotel will be opened in Los Angeles which will be managed by Hilton.

The founder said that he was going to initially relaunch Pan Am as a charter airline focusing on South and Central American markets from the East Coast first, the airline also suggested that the company UrbanLink could use VTOL taxis as a feeder for the airline.

In Early 2026 Pan Am made a deal with Amadeus for its IT solutions.
