= List of largest Japanese companies =

This article lists the largest companies in Japan in terms of their revenue, net profit and total assets, according to the American business magazines Fortune and Forbes, as well as the UK-based B2B data provider Global Database.

== 2024 Global Database list ==
This list displays selected Japanese companies ranked among the largest by annual revenue in 2024, based on the most recent available financial data from Global Database, a UK-based B2B company intelligence provider. Figures are shown in millions of US dollars for the fiscal year 2024. Also listed are the headquarters location, industry sector, and other relevant corporate details for each company.

Rank	Name	Industry	Revenue (FY2020) USD millions
1	Toyota	Automotive	275,790
2	Honda	Automotive, Motorcycles,	137,580
3	Mitsubishi Corporation	Conglomerate	136,190
4	Japan Post Holdings	Conglomerate	110,110
5	Nippon Telegraph and Telephone	Telecommunications	109,650

== 2022 Fortune list ==
This list displays all 45 Japanese companies that are in the Fortune Global 500, which ranks the world's largest companies by annual revenue. The figures below are given in millions of US dollars and are for the fiscal year 2021. Also listed are the headquarters location, net profit, number of employees worldwide and industry sector of each company.

Rank	Fortune 500 rank	Name	Industry	Revenue (USD millions)	Profits (USD millions)	Assets (USD millions)	Employees (FY2021/2022)	Headquarters
1	▼10	Toyota	Automotive	279,377	25,371	557,522	361,255	Toyota
▲2	▲41	Mitsubishi	Conglomerate	153,690	8,345	180,479	80,728	Tokyo
▼3	▼61	Honda	Automotive	129,546	6,294	197,456	204,035	Tokyo
▲4	▼78	Itochu	Trading	109,215	7,302	100,104	136,722	Osaka and Tokyo
▲5	▼83	Nippon Telegraph and Telephone	Telecommunications	108,215	10,513	196,542	338,575	Tokyo
▲6	▲88	Mitsui & Co.	Conglomerate	104,664	8,142	122,916	44,336	Tokyo
▼7	▼94	Japan Post Holdings	Conglomerate	100,278	4,466	2,502,652	232,112	Tokyo
▲8	▼113	Hitachi	Conglomerate	91,374	5,194	114,385	355,091	Tokyo
▲9	▲116	Sony	Conglomerate	88,320	4,781	79,468	41,852	Tokyo
▲10	▼140	ENEOS Holdings	Oil and Gas	80,132	4,781	79,468	41,852	Tokyo
▲11	▲147	Seven & I Holdings Co.	Retail	78,458	1,890	75,888	127,196	Tokyo
▼12	▼148	AEON	Retail	78,155	58.3	101,016	288,064	Chiba
▲13	▲157	Marubeni	Trading	75,742	3,777	67,997	49,623	Tokyo
▼14	▼161	Nissan	Automotive	74,994	1,918	134,844	141,983	Yokohama
▼15	▼164	Nippon Life	Insurance	74,392	3,086	727,962	92,737	Osaka
16	▼167	Dai-ichi Life	Insurance	73,082	3,644	542,633	62,294	Tokyo
▲17	▲172	Toyota Tsusho	Trading	71,464	1,978	50,598	65,218	Nagoya
▼18	▼193	Panasonic	Electronics	65,774	2,273	66,086	240,198	Osaka
▲19	▼214	Nippon Steel	Steel	60,612	5,673	72,089	115,667	Tokyo
▼20	▼234	SoftBank Group	Conglomerate	55,383	−15,204	391,604	59,721	Tokyo
▼21	▼240	Mitsubishi UFJ Financial Group	Financials	54,087	10,066	3,078,263	135,042	Tokyo
▲22	▼250	Idemitsu Kosan	Oil and Gas	52,335	2,488	37,897	16,606	Tokyo
23	▼253	Tokio Marine	Insurance	52,198	3,743	224,411	43,048	Tokyo
▲24	▼278	Denso	Automotive	49,098	2,349	61,216	167,950	Kariya
▲25	▼279	Sumitomo Group	Trading	48,916	4,127	78,924	74,253	Tokyo
▼26	▼290	Tokyo Electric Power Company	Electric utility	47,268	50.2	105,868	37,939	Tokyo
▲26	▼309	MS&AD Insurance Group	Insurance	45,685	2,339	206,192	39,962	Tokyo
▲27	▼351	Mitsubishi Electric	Electronics	39,851	1,811	42,072	145,696	Tokyo
▲28	▼354	Daiwa House	Construction	39,520	2,005	45,072	48,831	Osaka
▲29	▲358	JFE Holdings	Steel	38,858	2,564	43,554	64,296	Tokyo
▲30	▼377	Meiji Yasuda Life	Insurance	37,515	1,618	397,022	48,179	Tokyo
▲31	▼383	Sompo Holdings	Insurance	37,098	2,001	113,564	47,776	Tokyo
▼32	▼388	Sumitomo Mitsui Financial Group	Banking	36,596	6,290	2,122	101,023	Tokyo
▲33	▼401	Mitsubishi Chemical Holdings	Chemicals	35,402	1,577	45,909	69,784	Tokyo
34	▼404	Mizuho Financial Group	Banking	35,279	4,722	1,952,608	52,464	Tokyo
▲35	▼409	Aisin Seiki	Automotive	34,872	221		119,535	Kariya
▲36	▼418	Mitsubishi Heavy Industries	Industrials	34,363	1,010	42,141	77,991	Tokyo
▲37	▼442	Sumitomo Life Insurance	Insurance	32,041	406	354,124	42,954	Osaka
▲38	▼444	Canon Inc.	Electronics	32,005	1,956	41,265	184,034	Tokyo
▲39	▼446	Fujitsu	Telecommunications	31,929	1,626	27,442	124,216	Tokyo
▲40	▼448	Takeda Pharmaceutical	Pharmaceuticals	31,771	2,048	108,541	47,347	Tokyo
▲41	▼449	Suzuki Motor	Automotive	31,765	1,427	34,224	69,193	Hamamatsu
▲42	▼476	Sumitomo Electric Industries	Electronics	28,578	669		283,910	Osaka
▲43	▼480	Toshiba	Electronics	29,705	1,732	30,759	116,224	Tokyo
▼44	▼484	Bridgestone	Automotive	29,570	3,589	39,736	135,636	Tokyo
▲45	▼489	Medipal Holdings	Retail	29,295	261.9	14,080	14,454	Tokyo

== 2022 Forbes list ==
This list is based on the Forbes Global 2000, which ranks the world's 2,000 largest publicly traded companies. The Forbes list takes into account a multitude of factors, including the revenue, net profit, total assets and market value of each company; each factor is given a weighted rank in terms of importance when considering the overall ranking. The table below also lists the headquarters location and industry sector of each company. The figures are in billions of US dollars and are for the year 2021. The top 50 companies in the Forbes 2000 from Japan are listed.

Rank	Forbes 2000 rank	Name	Headquarters	Revenue (billions US$)	Profit (billions US$)	Assets (billions US$)	Value (billions US$)	Industry
1	▲10	Toyota	Toyota	281.75	28.15	552.46	237.73	Automotive
▲2	▲44	SoftBank Group	Tokyo	96.86	20.87	418.94	71.69	Conglomerate
▼3	▼52	Nippon Telegraph and Telephone	Tokyo	110.39	10.15	204.46	103.98	Telecommunications
4	▲56	Sony	Tokyo	89.90	7.99	260.48	108.84	Conglomerate
▼4	▼59	Mitsubishi UFJ Financial Group	Tokyo	48.29	11.29	3,176.37	75.75	Financials
▲5	▼103	Honda	Tokyo	130.16	7.24	193.22	44.99	Automotive
▲6	104	Mitsubishi	Tokyo	146.94	5.90	178.13	50.87	Conglomerate
7	▲127	Sumitomo Mitsui Financial Group	Tokyo	35.50	6.40	2,176.62	42.33	Banking
▲8	▲140	Mitsui	Tokyo	65.50	3.70	114.30	24.10	Conglomerate
▲9	▲141	Itochu	Osaka	107.99	6.52	102.18	45.95	Trading
▲10	▼145	Hitachi	Tokyo	82.90	1.80	94.60	29.30	Conglomerate
▼11	▼146	KDDI	Tokyo	47.80	5.90	86.50	66.90	Telecommunications
▼12	▼157	Japan Post Holdings	Tokyo	103.58	3.93	2,614.33	26.56	Conglomerate
▼13	▼178	Tokio Marine	Tokyo	50.57	3.85	234.91	35.19	Insurance
▲14	▲186	Mizuho Financial Group	Tokyo	26.76	5.42	1,957.58	31.38	Banking
▲15	▲213	Dai-ichi Life	Tokyo	66.73	4.47	571.45	19.9	Insurance
▲16	▲213	Takeda Pharmaceutical	Tokyo	31.55	3.99	110.27	45.32	Pharmaceuticals
▲17	▼260	Seven & I Holdings Co.	Tokyo	78.47	1.89	75.88	39.19	Retail
▲18	▲265	Denso	Kariya	49.49	2.51	61.51	45.14	Automotive
▲19	▲312	Marubeni	Tokyo	72.32	3.51	63.99	19.70	Trading
▲20	▼320	Sumitomo Group	Tokyo	48.22	2.69	77.8	20.28	Trading
▲21	▲331	Nippon Steel	Tokyo	57.54	5.45	74.59	14.92	Steel
▲22	▼342	Panasonic	Osaka	65.97	2.10	64.06	20.98	Electronics
▲23	▼343	MS&AD Insurance Group	Tokyo	41.89	1.81	216.37	16.51	Insurance
24	▼344	Orix	Osaka	22.73	2.38	122.37	21.71	Financials
▼25	▼364	Japan Tobacco	Tokyo	21.16	3.08	50.14	30.53	Tobacco
▲26	▼381	Shin-Etsu Chemical	Tokyo	17.2	3.95	32.64	57.46	Chemicals
▼27	▼384	ENEOS Holdings	Tokyo	90.31	3.45	79.99	11.38	Oil and Gas
▲28	▼386	Sompo Japan Nipponkoa Insurance	Tokyo	35.67	2.19	119.93	13.91	Insurance
▼29	▼406	Mitsubishi Electric	Tokyo	40.34	2.13	41.12	22.76	Electronics
▲30	▲407	Nissan	Yokohama	79.17	1.10	136.86	16.36	Automotive
▲31	▼417	Daikin	Osaka	26.88	1.88	30.45	46.78	Electrical equipment
▼32	▼421	Canon Inc.	Tokyo	31.98	1.95	41.26	24.66	Electronics
▲33	▼454	Recruit Holdings	Tokyo	24.80	2.39	20.94	62.03	Electronics
▲34	▲459	Toyota Tsusho	Tokyo	69.53	2.05	50.05	13.04	Trading
▲35	▼460	Toyota Industries	Kariya	23.32	1.73	39.73	25.70	Machinery
▼36	▼464	Bridgestone	Tokyo	29.54	1.47	39.73	25.70	Automotive
▼37	▼466	Daiwa House	Osaka	38.86	1.89	47.86	15.82	Construction
▲38	▼473	Fujitsu	Tokyo	32.83	1.93	27.06	29.14	Real estate
▲39	▲481	Nintendo	Kyoto	15.24	4.29	21.77	58.01	Video game
▼40	▼493	Mitsui Fudosan	Tokyo	18.26	1.40	71.09	20.04	Real estate
▼41	▼495	Komatsu	Tokyo	24.51	1.78	34.97	22.06	Industrials
▼42	▼498	Fast Retailing	Yamaguchi	19.27	1.89	22.93	51.27	Retail
▲43	▼503	Fujifilm	Tokyo	22.57	1.93	32.36	22.93	Consumer goods
▲44	▲513	Murata Manufacturing	Kyoto	16.28	2.83	23.07	38.94	Electronic
▲45	▲536	Toshiba	Tokyo	30.13	1.69	30.76	18.19	Electronic
▲46	▲544	Tokyo Electron	Tokyo	17.09	3.60	14.97	67.25	Electronic
▲47	▲549	Kubota	Osaka	19.99	1.60	32.77	21.19	Agricultural machinery
▲48	▼560	Suzuki Motor	Hamamatsu	32.56	1.54	34.68	15.39	Automotive
▲49	▲573	Asahi Group	Tokyo	20.35	1.40	39.49	17.94	Beverage
▼50	▼603	Sumitomo Mitsui Trust Holdings	Tokyo	10.67	1.43	553.78	11.81	Financials
▼51	▼653	Ricoh	Tokyo	17.40	0.44	16.23	5.06	Electronics

== See also ==
- List of companies of Japan
- List of the largest trading partners of Japan
