= Opera a la Carte (UK) =

Opera a la Carte is a touring chamber opera company based in London, England. It was founded in 1993 by its General Director, Nicholas Heath, who was a member of the chorus of the Royal Opera in London from 1993 to 2006.

== Repertoire ==
Since 1996, the company has produced opera "classics" from La traviata and Rigoletto, to The Barber of Seville, Mozart operas such as Don Giovanni and The Marriage of Figaro and those of Puccini, such as Tosca and Madame Butterfly and La boheme. The company also performs at opera festivals.

== Reputation ==
Of the company's 2003 production of Cosi fan tutte, the reviewer of the Gazette and Herald wrote: "The quality of the production by Nicholas Heath, the singing and the acting was exceptionally high, as was the music produced by piano and a wind quartet directed by Susie Allan from the piano." A reviewer called its 2006 production of The Magic Flute "imaginative" and praised its "charm" and cast. A 2010 review of its Tosca stated: "There are more thrills and spills in a terrific, tiny-budget Tosca. .... Heath’s lusty production shows that the greater the risk, the greater the rewards." The reviewer of The Royal Gazette said that the company's 2015 La traviata at the Bermuda Festival was "a triumph of grand opera on a small scale." Reviewing its 1960s-set La Boheme (renamed La Boh|0xe8|me), The Royal Gazette's review missed the richness of a full orchestra but praised the "imaginative, fun touches", effective staging and use of the space, "spot-on" set, costuming, props and make-up, "strong and entirely convincing performance from all" of the cast, and "sense of intimacy between the audience and the singers, the action, and the story" that fulfilled the company's "desire to [bring] opera closer to the people".

== See also ==
- List of opera companies in Europe
