= Royal Edward Arms =

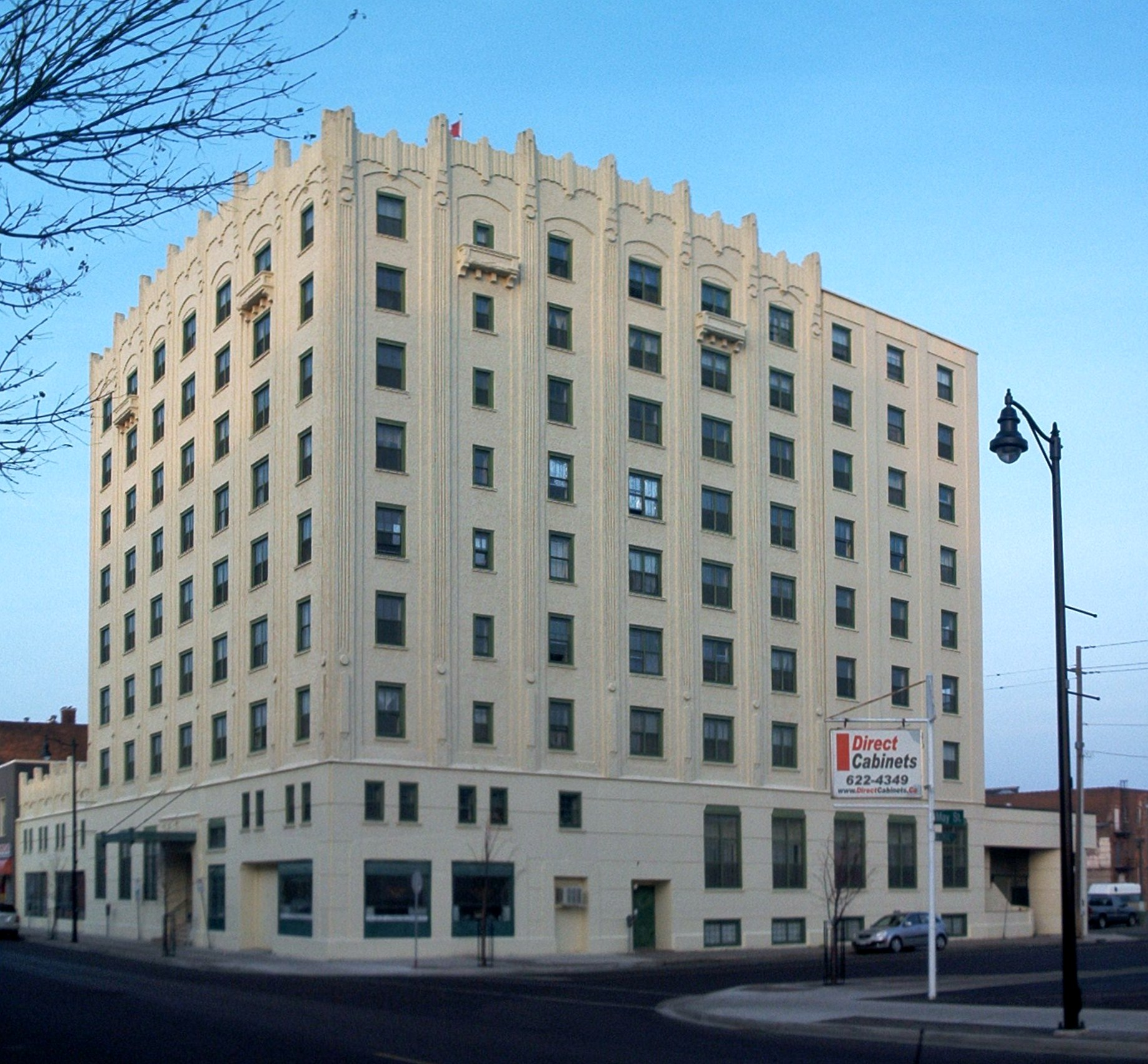
- The Royal Edward Arms
- Interactive map of the Royal Edward Arms area
- Former names: Royal Edward Hotel
- Alternative names: The Royal Eddie

General information
- Architectural style: Art Deco with Gothic stylization
- Location: Thunder Bay, Ontario, Canada, 114 May Street South
- Coordinates: 48°23′00″N 89°14′42″W
- Construction started: February 1928
- Completed: 1929
- Renovated: 1984
- Cost: $419,000
- Client: Fort William Hotels Limited
- Owner: Habib Entreprises Ltd

Technical details
- Structural system: Reinforced concrete
- Floor count: 8

Design and construction
- Architects: Dorr and Dorr
- Main contractor: R. E. Mason

The Royal Edward Arms is an apartment building built in 1928 in the historic downtown of Fort William, part of the city of Thunder Bay, Ontario, Canada. It rises 8 storeys above the intersection of South May and George Streets.

Originally built in 1928 as a hotel, it was highly successful until the 1970s. It sat vacant until 1985, when it was renovated into a 64-unit low-income housing facility. Today it is owned by Habib Enterprises which operates it as a private sector apartment building. It was added to the Thunder Bay Heritage Register in 1988.

== History ==
In response to a growing economy, the need for a larger hotel in the city of Fort William became a point of discussion in 1927. The community had hoped one of the national railways would construct a grand hotel in the city for some time, but eventually took the initiative to build a hotel themselves. Led by local businessman Norman M. Paterson, 800 members of the community raised $419,000 in several months and construction of the hotel commenced in 1928. Upon completion in 1929, the hotel had 105 rooms, each with an ensuite, with an additional 21 "sample rooms" available for day rentals. The hotel featured a large kitchen, dining space for 150 people, a banquet hall, ballroom and convention space.

The hotel was owned by Fort William Hotels Limited, and operated successfully for many years. Notable guests include Queen Elizabeth II and Prince Charles, Governor General Roland Michener, Prime Minister John Diefenbaker, Gene Autry, and George Hees. However, by the end of the 1970s the hotel was no longer feasible and closed its doors.

The Royal Edward sat vacant for several years and almost faced demolition, but was saved when a non-profit housing corporation obtained the funds to renovate the building into apartments. The renovations were led by architectural firm Ranta and Tett, and cost $2,478,305. It was operated by the Thunder Bay District Housing Corporation under a lease from the City of Thunder Bay. The lease expired on July 31, 2015. The City of Thunder Bay sold the building to a company owned by Asanhul Habib, a local architect, for $500,000. It is now operated as a private sector apartment building. Mr. Habib has announced plans to convert the building back to its original use as a hotel. Mr. Habib sold the property to Ali Abbas in 2019.

== Architecture ==
Minneapolis architectural firm Dorr and Dorr was hired to design the building, and local architect R. E. Mason was hired as the contractor. The building was constructed using the slipform method, where concrete is poured into a mold that can rise with the structure as construction progresses, resulting in a seamless reinforced concrete structure.

Like most buildings from the era, the windows are small relative to the surface of the walls. The subtle Art Deco detailing of the building is intended to express the continuity of the homogeneous mass. Vertical details rise between the windows, with a geometric pattern repeated between windows on the second floor. While it appears to have a stucco façade, the exterior surface of the building is part of the concrete structure itself. The top of the building features Gothic inspired detailing.

A modern addition was added in the 1960s. Renovations in 1980 were largely confined to the interior. Exterior work was limited to waterblasting and painting.
