= Harbour City Opera =

Opera company in Sydney, Australia

Harbour City Opera (HCO) is an opera company in Sydney, Australia, presenting chamber opera performances from the mainstream operatic repertoire. The company was founded in early 2013 to provide opportunities for opera singers on the cusp of a professional career and other professionals in the field, and to engage an audience outside the traditional opera circles.

HCO's founder and creative director, Sarah Ann Walker, has been nominated for the 2014 Telstra Business Women's Awards. The board of Harbour City Opera includes Wagnerian tenor Glenn Winslade and singer and pianist Glenn Amer.

== Productions ==
- 2013: Excerpts of Die Walküre (Richard Wagner) and act 1 of Così fan tutte (W. A. Mozart); directed by Paulo Montoya, musical director Chris Cartner and Thomas Johnson
- 2013: Suor Angelica (Giacomo Puccini); directed by Andy Morton, designed by Adrienn Lord, musical director Sharolyn Kimmorley
- 2014: Double bill concert performances of Il tabarro (Puccini) and The Telephone (Gian Carlo Menotti); musical director: Glenn Amer
- 2014: Gianni Schicchi (Puccini) and L'enfant prodigue (Claude Debussy)
