= European University of Bangladesh =

Private university in Dhaka, Bangladesh

- Motto: We Shape Your Dream
- Type: Private
- Established: 2012; 14 years ago
- Founder: Prof. Dr. Mokbul Ahmed Khan,
- Chancellor: President Mohammed Shahabuddin
- Vice-Chancellor: Md. Ghulam Murtaza
- Faculty: 200+
- Students: 8,000+
- Location: 2/4 Gabtoli,1216, Dhaka, Bangladesh; 23.7739°N 90.3661°E
- Campus: Urban
- Website: eub.edu.bd

The European University of Bangladesh (Bengali: ইউরোপিয়ান বিশ্ববিদ্যালয়) or EUB is a private university located in Dhaka, Bangladesh. The university was established in 2012 under the Private University Act, 1992. The university was founded by Prof. Dr. Mokbul Ahmed Khan, .

== History ==
European University of Bangladesh (EUB) is a private university aiming at providing modern education of European standards in Bangladesh. It has been accredited by the government of the People's Republic of Bangladesh, curricula and academic while its programs have been approved by the University Grants Commission (UGC). It was established under the Private University Act 2010 with the approval of the government of Bangladesh on 14 March 2012 for awarding degrees in various fields. The president of the People's Republic of Bangladesh is the chancellor. They also have an established cultural theater. which is called by EUB Theater. They are organizing and participating in stage drama at Shilpakala Academy. and also making video fiction too. In 2024, Mohiuddin Khan Alamgir resigned from the post of chairman and then Vice Chairman Makbul Ahmed Khan took the chairman's seat.

== Academic ==
=== Faculties and departments ===
- (1) Faculty of Science & Engineering
  - (1) Department of Civil Engineering (CE)
  - (2) Department of Electrical and Electronic Engineering (EEE)
  - (3) Department of Computer Science and Engineering (CSE)
  - (4) Department of Industrial and Production Engineering (IPE)
  - (5) Department of Textile Engineering (TE)
- (2) Faculty of Business Administration & Industrial Management
  - (1) Bachelor of Business Administration (BBA)
  - (2) Master of Business Administration (MBA) (Regular)
  - (3) Master of Business Administration (MBA) (Executive)
  - (4) Bachelor of Tourism and Hospitality Management (BTHM)
- (3) Faculty of Arts and Social Science
  - (1) BSS (Hon's) in Economics
  - (2) MSS in Economics
  - (3) Bachelor of Arts in English (Hon's)
  - (4) MA in English (Preli & Final)
  - (5) MSS in Governance and Development Studies
  - (6) Bachelor of Laws (2Yrs LLB)
  - (7) Bachelor of Laws (4Yrs LLB)
  - (8) Master of Laws (1 & 2 Yrs LLM)
