= List of Latin American and South American opera companies =

This is a list of professional Latin American and South American opera companies and opera-related organizations. For opera companies from other geographical locations, see List of important opera companies.

== Latin America ==
=== Central America ===
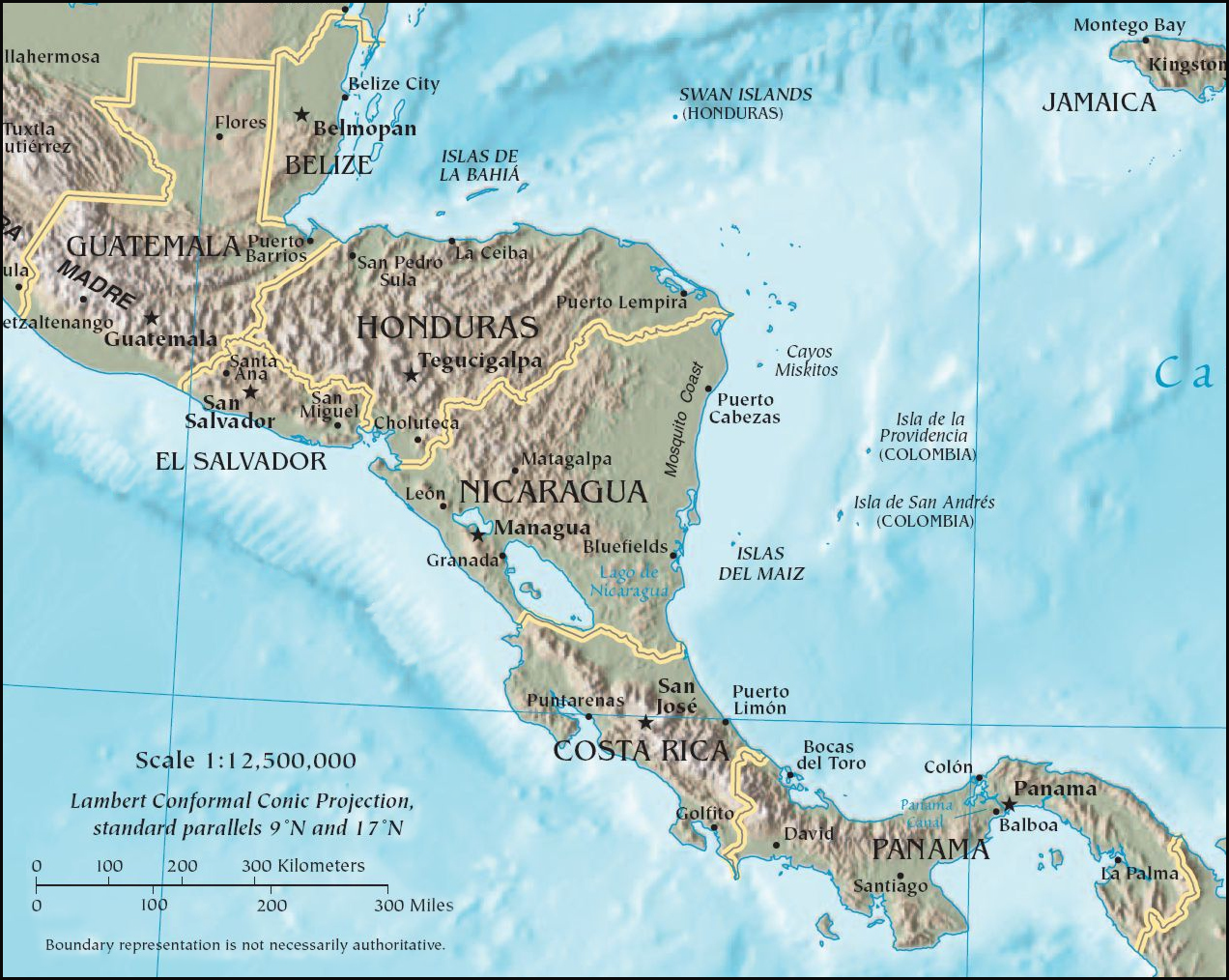
Map of Central America

==== Belize ====
Name of opera company	Principal theatre	Principal location
Belize Opera	National Opera Theatre	Belmopan

==== Costa Rica ====
Name of opera company	Principal theatre	Principal location
Opera de Costa Rica	Teatro Nacional	San José

==== El Salvador ====
Name of opera company	Principal theatre	Principal location
Asociación Lírica Salvadoreña	Teatro Presidente and Teatro Nacional	San Salvador

==== Guatemala ====
Name of opera company	Principal theatre	Principal location
Asociacion Lirica Guatemalteca	Teatro Nacional	Guatemala City

==== Honduras ====
Name of opera company	Principal theatre	Principal location
Opera de Honduras	Teatro Nacional de Honduras	Tegucigalpa

==== Panama ====
Name of opera company	Principal theatre	Principal location
La Opera de Panama	National Opera House	Panama City

=== North America ===
==== Mexico ====
Name of opera company	Principal theatre	Principal location
Ópera de México	Palacio de Bellas Artes	Mexico City

==== USA ====
Name of opera company	Principal theatre	Principal location
International Brazilian Opera Company	Harlem	New York City

=== South America ===
Map of South America

==== Argentina ====
Name of opera company	Principal theatre	Principal location
Teatro Colón		Buenos Aires
Teatro Argentino	Alberto Ginastera Hall, Teatro Argentino	La Plata

==== Brazil ====
Name of opera company	Principal theatre	Principal location
Teatro da Paz		Belém
Fundação Clóvis Salgado-Palácio das Artes		Belo Horizonte
Teatro Amazonas		Manaus
Theatro Municipal (Rio de Janeiro)		Rio de Janeiro
Teatro Alfa		São Paulo
Theatro Municipal (São Paulo)		São Paulo
International Brazilian Opera Company	IBOC	Brasília

==== Chile ====
Name of opera company	Principal theatre	Principal location
Teatro Municipal de Santiago		Santiago

==== Peru ====
Name of opera company	Principal theatre	Principal location
Prolirica		Lima

==== Venezuela ====
Name of opera company	Principal theatre	Principal location
Teresa Carreño Cultural Complex		Caracas
