= Opera Lyrica =

Opera Lyrica is an opera company based in Oxford, England, composed of young professionals. It was founded in May 2012 by Paola Cuffolo (Artistic Director) and Nick Simpson (General Director), and was granted charitable status in August 2013 to increase public accessibility to the art form and to provide performance and work experience in staged opera productions for singers, instrumentalists, conductors, directors and technical crew in the early stages of their careers. The company's first two productions were staged in collaboration with St Peter's College Opera at Oxford University.

== Production history ==
- Double bill of Mozart's Der Schauspieldirektor and Die Zauberflöte in collaboration with St Peter's College Opera, St. Peter's College Chapel, Oxford, 24, 26, 27 October 2012
- Rossini's The Barber of Seville in collaboration with St Peter's College Opera, St. Peter's College Chapel, Oxford, 8, 10, 11 May 2013
- Handel's Acis and Galatea performed in venues across London and the South of England, October/November 2013
- Mozart's Così fan tutte in the 20th Century Theatre, Notting Hill, 4, 5 September 2014
- Blow's Venus and Adonis and Purcell's Dido and Aeneas performed in venues across London and the South of England, February 2015
