= List of BSE SENSEX companies =

The list of all companies that have been included in the BSE SENSEX from its inception in 1986 are listed below. The base year of SENSEX is 1978–79 with a base value of 100. During the introduction of the SENSEX in 1986, some of the companies included in the base calculation in 1979 were removed and new companies were added.

The index is revised semi-annually in June and December.

== Current ==
Company	Symbol	Ticker	Industry	Entry date
Adani Ports & SEZ	ADANIPORTS.BO	532921	Ports	24 June 2024
Asian Paints	ASIANPAINT.BO	500820	Consumer Durables	21 December 2015
Axis Bank	AXISBANK.BO	532215	Banks	23 December 2013
Bajaj Finance	BAJFINANCE.BO	500034	Finance	24 December 2018
Bajaj Finserv	BAJAJFINSV.BO	532978	Finance	22 June 2020
Bharat Electronics	BEL.BO	500049	Aerospace & Defence	23 June 2025
Bharti Airtel	BHARTIARTL.BO	532454	Telecommunication	10 November 2003
Eternal	ETERNAL.BO	543320	Retailing	23 December 2024
HCLTech	HCLTECH.BO	532281	IT	24 December 2018
HDFC Bank	HDFCBANK.BO	500180	Banks	10 November 2003
Hindustan Unilever	HINDUNILVR.BO	500696	FMCG	2 January 1986
ICICI Bank	ICICIBANK.BO	532174	Banks	31 May 2002
IndiGo	INDIGO.BO	539448	Airlines	22 December 2025
Infosys	INFY.BO	500209	IT	16 November 1998
ITC	ITC.BO	500875	FMCG	2 January 1986
Kotak Mahindra Bank	KOTAKBANK.BO	500247	Banks	19 June 2017
Larsen & Toubro	LT.BO	500510	Construction	27 September 2004
Mahindra & Mahindra	M&M.BO	500520	Automobiles	9 July 2007
Maruti Suzuki	MARUTI.BO	532500	Automobiles	19 May 2004
NTPC	NTPC.BO	532555	Power	6 June 2005
Power Grid	POWERGRID.BO	532898	Power	20 June 2016
Reliance Industries	RELIANCE.BO	500325	Petroleum	2 January 1986
State Bank of India	SBIN.BO	500112	Banks	19 August 1996
Sun Pharma	SUNPHARMA.BO	524715	Pharmaceuticals	8 August 2011
Tata Consultancy Services	TCS.BO	532540	IT	6 June 2005
Tata Steel	TATASTEEL.BO	500470	Metals	21 June 2021
Tech Mahindra	TECHM.BO	532755	IT	24 June 2019
Titan Company	TITAN.BO	500114	Consumer Durables	23 December 2019
Trent	TRENT.BO	500251	Retailing	23 June 2025
UltraTech Cement	ULTRACEMCO.BO	532538	Cement	23 December 2019

== Previous ==
Ticker	Company	Date added	Date dropped
500410	ACC	2 January 1986	6 December 2010
500425	Ambuja Cement	19 August 1996	28 July 2008
532977	Bajaj Auto	19 August 1996	14 March 2008
532977	Bajaj Auto	6 December 2010	20 December 2021
500103	Bharat Heavy Electricals	19 August 1996	20 June 2016
500087	Cipla	8 January 2001	28 July 2008
500087	Cipla	3 May 2010	18 December 2017
533278	Coal India	8 August 2011	24 June 2019
533278	DLF	19 November 2007	11 June 2012
500124	Dr. Reddy's Laboratories	10 April 2000	19 November 2007
500124	Dr. Reddy's Laboratories	11 June 2012	18 June 2018
500124	Dr. Reddy's Laboratories	21 December 2020	19 December 2022
532155	GAIL	9 January 2012	19 June 2017
500300	Grasim Industries	2 January 1986	26 May 2010
500182	Hero MotoCorp	7 January 2002	9 July 2007
500182	Hero MotoCorp	26 June 2009	22 June 2020
500440	Hindalco Industries	2 January 1986	21 December 2015
500104	Hindustan Petroleum	19 August 1996	6 June 2005
532187	IndusInd Bank	18 December 2017	23 June 2025
532286	Jindal Steel & Power	26 May 2010	23 December 2013
500228	JSW Steel	13 July 2023	23 December 2024
500257	Lupin	22 June 2015	18 December 2017
500790	Nestlé India	2 January 1986	10 November 2003
500790	Nestlé India	23 December 2019	23 June 2025
500312	Oil and Natural Gas Corporation	10 November 2003	21 June 2021
532712	Reliance Communications	12 June 2006	8 August 2011
500390	Reliance Infrastructure	19 August 1996	8 August 2011
500570	Tata Motors Passenger Vehicles	2 January 1986	23 December 2019
500570	Tata Motors Passenger Vehicles	19 December 2022	22 December 2025
500400	Tata Power	2 January 1986	10 April 2000
500400	Tata Power	10 November 2003	12 June 2006
500400	Tata Power	28 June 2008	22 June 2015
500295	Vedanta	27 August 2013	21 December 2015
500295	Vedanta	18 June 2018	23 December 2019
507685	Wipro	10 November 2003	24 December 2018
507685	Wipro	20 December 2021	24 June 2024
532648	Yes Bank	18 December 2017	23 December 2019
