= Beard Miller Company =

Legacy accounting company

Beard Miller Company, LLP
- Type: Limited Liability Partnership (LLP)
- Industry: Accounting; Professional Services; Tax; Consulting
- Headquarters: Headquarters in Reading, Pennsylvania
- Products: Professional Services
- Revenue: $66 million USD (FY 2008)
- Website: http://www.bmc-llp.com

Beard Miller Company LLP (bmc), a legacy firm of ParenteBeard LLC, was an accounting and auditing firm serving clients mainly in the mid-Atlantic region of the United States. The firm was created through a series of mergers, the largest occurring in January 2001 between Beard & Company and Miller & Company. Prior to merging with Parente Randolph in October 2009, bmc had 16 offices located in Pennsylvania, Maryland, New Jersey, and New York, and more than 600 employees. bmc was a member of the larger BDO Seidman Alliance, which enables Accounting and Consulting organizations other than the "Big 4 auditors" to share resources which may be otherwise unattainable. The CEO of bmc was Lamar Stoltzfus, who is now chairman of ParenteBeard.

== Branding ==
Though the firm’s legal name was Beard Miller Company, the firm elected to use its initials in lowercase (bmc) in day-to-day operations. The firm also used numbers in place of letters when advertising the brand’s image, a form of "rebus". For instance, the word “vision”, which appeared prominently in the company’s literature, is spelled out V1510N.

== Services ==
bmc provided the following services: Audit (including IT Audit and Employee Benefits), Tax Consulting and Form Preparation, and Business Consulting. The firm also had a sister organization, bmc Financial Advisors, which, while technically a separate entity, worked closely with the larger accounting organization.

== Locations ==
Beard Miller Company has 16 American offices in Pennsylvania, Maryland, New York, and New Jersey.

== Merger ==
In August 2009, the firm announced that it would merge with Parente Randolph, another Mid-Atlantic public accounting firm, effective October 1, 2009. The new firm is headquartered in Philadelphia, PA and is named ParenteBeard LLC.
