= Economy of Taiwan =

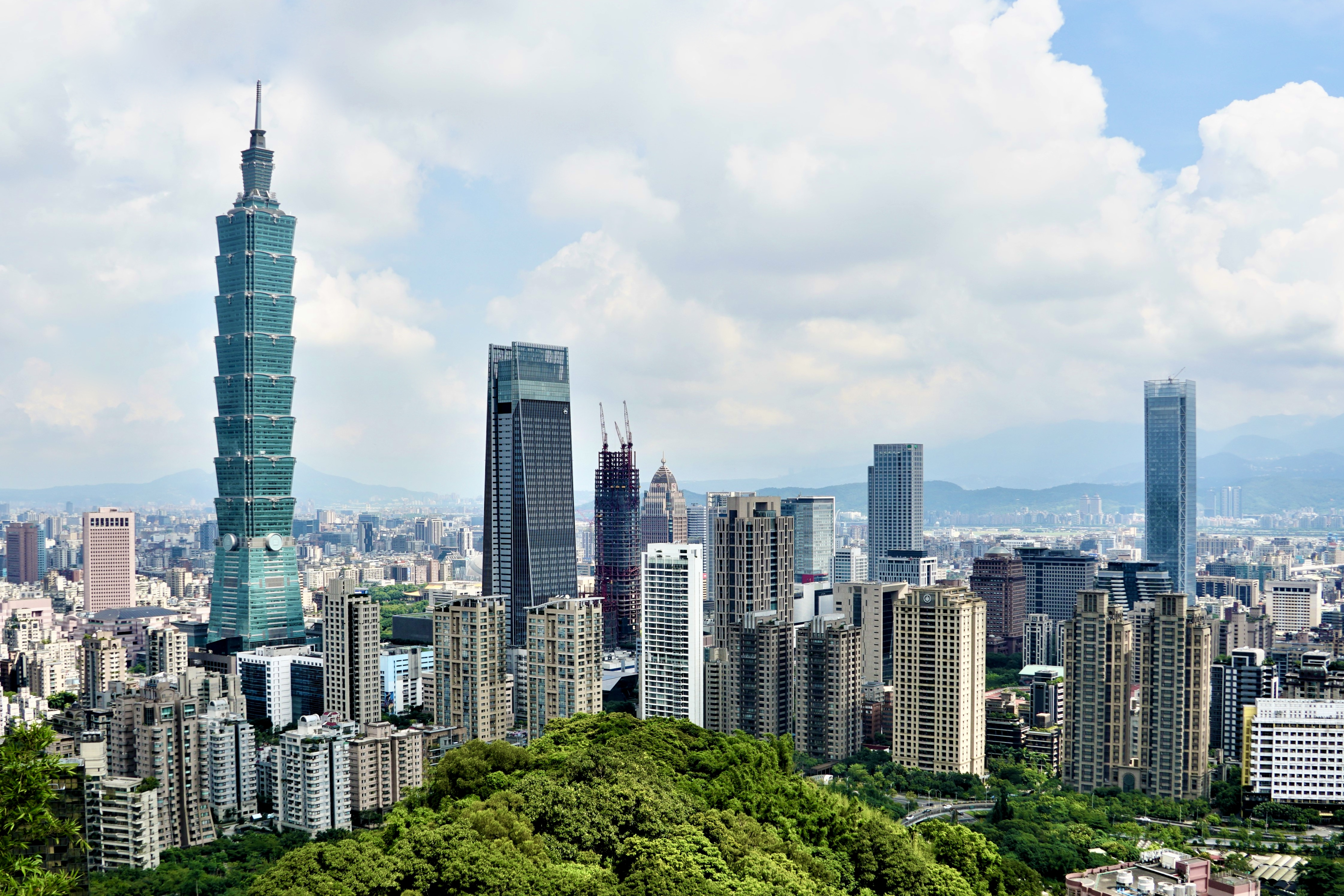
- Taipei, the capital and financial center of Taiwan
- Currency: New Taiwan dollar (TWD)
- Fiscal year: Calendar year
- Trade organizations: WTO, APEC and ICC
- Country group: Advanced economy; High-income economy

Statistics
- Population: ▲23,196,178 (May 2022)
- GDP: ▲$1.02 trillion (nominal; 2026); ▲$2.41 trillion (PPP; 2026)
- GDP rank: 22nd (nominal, 2026); 20th (PPP, 2026)
- GDP growth: ▲10.7% (2026); ▲4.3% (2027f); ▲3.2% (2028f)
- GDP per capita: ▲$43,951 (nominal; 2026); ▲$103,743 (PPP; 2026)
- GDP per capita rank: 29th (nominal, 2026); 8th (PPP, 2026)
- GDP by sector: Agriculture: 1.8%; Industry: 36%; Services: 62.1%; (2017 est.)
- Inflation (CPI): 1.66% (April 2025)
- Population below national poverty line: ▼1.13% (2024) (Note: This statistic measures the percentage of the population classified as low-income persons. After 2011, Taiwan classifies those living below the poverty line, which is 60% of the median disposable income per capita, set per city, as low-income persons.)
- Gini coefficient: 33.9 medium (2023 est.)
- Human Development Index: ▲0.926 very high (2021) (Note: The HDI annual report compiled by the UNDP does not include Taiwan because it is no longer a UN member state, and is neither included as part of the People's Republic of China by the UNDP when calculating data for China. Taiwan's Statistical Bureau calculated its HDI for 2021 to be 0.926 based on UNDP's 2010 methodology, which would place Taiwan at 19th globally in 2021 within the 2022 UNDP report.)
- Corruption Perceptions Index: 67 (2024) (25th)
- Labor force: ▲12.001 million (2024) ▲59.3% participation rate (2024)
- Labor force by occupation: Agriculture: 5%; Industry: 30%; Services: 65%; (2022 est.)
- Unemployment: ▼3.35% (2025)
- Average gross salary: NT$60,984; US$2,026 per month (2024)
- Main industries: Electronics, communications and information technology products, petroleum refining, chemicals, textiles, iron and steel, machinery, cement, food processing, vehicles, consumer products, pharmaceuticals; Agricultural: Rice, corn, vegetables, fruit, tea; pigs, poultry, beef, milk; fish; Natural: Small deposits of coal, natural gas, limestone, marble, and asbestos

External
- Exports: ▲$475 billion (2024)
- Export goods: Semiconductors, petrochemicals, automobile/auto parts, ships, wireless communication equipment, flat panel displays, steel, electronics, plastics, computers
- Main export partners: United States 30.9%; China 26.6%; Hong Kong 11.0%; ASEAN 18.6%; European Union 6.4%; Japan 4.7%; South Korea 4.1%; (2025)
- Imports: ▲$394 billion (2024)
- Import goods: Oil/petroleum, semiconductors, natural gas, coal, steel, computers, wireless communication equipment, automobiles, fine chemicals, textiles
- Main import partners: China 19.6%; South Korea 13.2%; ASEAN 12.9%; Japan 11.3%; European Union 10.4%; United States 10.1%; (2025)
- FDI stock: ▲ Outward: $567.3 billion (2024); ▲ Inward: $152.2 billion (2024)
- Current account: ▲$112 billion (2024)
- Gross external debt: ▲$219.947 billion (2024)
- Net international investment position: ▼1.556 trillion (2024)

Public finance
- Government debt: ▼27.1% of GDP (2024)
- Foreign reserves: ▲$600 billion (Oct 2025)
- Budget balance: −0.2% (of GDP) (2022 est.)
- Revenue: TWD 4.18 trillion (2024); USD 133 billion (Note: Calculated with the spot exchange rate, as of 29 November 2025 of 1 USD≈31.3919 NTD)
- Spending: TWD 4.07 trillion (2024); USD 130 billion (Note: Calculated with the spot exchange rate, as of 29 November 2025 of 1 USD≈31.3919 NTD)
- Credit rating: Standard & Poor's: AA+ (Domestic); AA+ (Foreign); AAA (T&C Assessment); Outlook: Stable; Moody's: Aa3; Outlook: Stable; Fitch: AA; Outlook: Stable
- All values, unless otherwise stated, are in US dollars.

Taiwan has a highly developed free-market economy. It is the 22nd-largest in the world by nominal GDP and 20th-largest by purchasing power parity. Its GDP per capita (PPP) ranks highly at 8th in the world, while its nominal GDP per capita is 29th in the world. This large purchasing power parity adjustment has been attributed to Taiwan's localised supply chains, relatively low cost of living, and in particular to accusations that the New Taiwan dollar is systemically undervalued through currency interventions, although the Central Bank of the Republic of China (Taiwan) has denied these claims. Taiwan is included in the advanced economies group by the International Monetary Fund, and in the high-income economies group by the World Bank.

During Dutch and Qing rule, Taiwan primarily exported agricultural goods like rice, sugar, and tea. During the period of Japanese colonization, Taiwan's agricultural exports benefited from electrification, railroads, and irrigation infrastructure. After 1949, the Kuomintang (KMT) instituted large-scale land reforms, turning farmer-renters into landowners. The resulting surplus in agricultural yields, as well as rising rural incomes, laid the groundwork for Taiwan's urbanization and industrialization in the import-substitution phase. In the subsequent period of export-oriented industrialization from the 1960s to the 1990s, Taiwan experienced rapid economic development from an agriculture-based society to an industrialized, high-income economy. This period of economic growth is also known as the Taiwan Miracle.

As of 2025, SMEs provide 80% of all employment opportunities in Taiwan's labor market. After 1945, the Kuomintang limited large private enterprise in order to maintain political power. This provided SMEs the room to grow and take market share. In most sectors, notably in electronics, petrochemicals and textiles, the state provided guidance but did not take any direct ownership. Instead, transnational corporations and local businesses cooperated to provide the capital, technology transfers, and cheap labor underpinning the Taiwan Miracle. Today, Taiwan maintains this same large network of SMEs responsible for the export of downstream products. Taiwan's insularity from the 1997 Asian Financial Crisis is often attributed to the resilience, adaptability, and entrepreneurial nature of SMEs.

Taiwan is a significant creditor nation, despite its economy's modest size, due to large and persistent current account surpluses. Taiwan's central bank, and increasingly Taiwan's life insurers, recycle the surpluses overseas. As a result, Taiwan has the world's sixth-largest foreign exchange reserves, and has holdings of overseas fixed income securities totaling $1.7 trillion, representing 200% of Taiwan's nominal GDP. Taiwan's net international investment position totals $1.6 trillion.

Taiwan, as one of the leading producers of computer microchip and high-tech electronics, has benefited from the AI Boom. Taiwan's economy relies heavily on semiconductor and other AI-related gear exports, which account for around 80% of its total exports. The ratio of Taiwan's exports to GDP is 76%. Consumption, by contrast, plays a relatively small role, accounting for 40% of Taiwan's GDP. As of 2026, Taiwan manufactures over 90% of the world's advanced AI chips. However, Taiwan's economy also faces challenges, such as low wage growth, concentration of economic growth in a very small number of tech companies such as TSMC, and an aging population.

== History ==
=== Pre-colonial period ===
Prior to the migration of Han Chinese to Taiwan, Taiwanese aborigines were engaged in varying forms of agriculture, hunting, and gathering. During the Ming dynasty period, Chinese pirates and sailors occasionally engaged in trade with the aborigines. The first permanent Han Chinese population of about 50,000 settled near Tainan after the Dutch East Indies Company offered incentives for migrant or permanent settlers to develop agriculture near Fort Orange. At this point, Taiwan's primary exports were sugar, rice, and deerskin. After Koxinga expelled the Dutch, the Tungning regime went to great lengths to develop Taiwan's economy, with about 100,000 Han Chinese residents by 1683. During the Qing period, Taiwan's frontier status meant that administration was lax and taxes were rarely enforced. Taiwan's tenancy rate in the 18th century was unusually high at 75%.

As a result of the Opium Wars, Qing China was forced to open treaty ports. This included ports in Taiwan: Tamsui, Keelung, Kaohsiung, which opened between 1862 and 1864. The treaty ports became a boon for Taiwan's economic growth, while sugar, tea, and camphor became major exports. During this period, Taiwan maintained a positive balance of payments. General Liu Mingchuan, Qing governor of Taiwan, spearheaded the modernization of Taiwan's infrastructure including a north–south railway, telegraphs, and modern naval defenses. His policies also promoted the assimilation of aborigines and reclamation of mountainous land. By the end of Qing rule, Taiwan's population numbered over 2.5 million.

=== Colonial period ===
After the Treaty of Shimonoseki, the development of Taiwan's economy began in earnest under Governor-general Kodama Gentaro and administrator Goto Shinpei. Their efforts include standardizing the currency, instituting tariffs, creating domestic monopolies, and the construction of railways, roads, telegraphs, and harbors. The Japanese sought to develop Taiwan's agriculture as a means to supply the grain and commodities necessary to industrialize the Japanese mainland, without necessarily industrializing Taiwan itself. An important first step was a land reform which forced large absentee landowners to sell land to smaller de facto landowners in exchange for government bonds, thereby legitimizing and systematizing private ownership. A combination of advanced farming techniques and new seed varieties produced steady yield growth in the following decades. Taiwan primarily exported rice and sugar, most of which was shipped and processed in Japanese mills.

With the outbreak of the Second Sino-Japanese War in 1937, colonial authorities set into motion the industrialization of Taiwan, to produce materiel for Japan's war machine. Industrialization was accompanied by two other policies—Japanization, in order to create the compliant labor force necessary to work the factories, and "South Bastion," a broad plan to use Taiwan as a fortified launching pad to secure natural resources in southern China and Southeast Asia. The Five-Year Plan of Productivity Expansion (1938) jump-started Taiwan's steel, weapons, chemical, and pharmaceutical industries. As Japan's industrial base suffered due to the Pacific War, Taiwanese factories filled in gaps, birthing a consumer goods industry. By 1941, Taiwan had transformed from a colonial periphery to a self-sufficient economy.

=== Early KMT period ===
In 1945, Taiwan was returned to the Nationalist government control, leading to swift economic decline. Taiwan's economy, already strained from the demands of the Pacific Theater and an American bombing campaign, was dealt another blow when the Nationalist government swiftly repurposed Taiwan's agricultural production for the Chinese Civil War. The Nationalists also inherited the industrial assets of the Japanese, much of which was disassembled and reassembled in mainland China. Inflation skyrocketed to more than 3000%. In early 1949, Chen Cheng was assigned governor of Taiwan. His early reforms included a 37.5% cap on rent for tenant farmers, as well as the creation of the New Taiwan dollar.

Following the Great Retreat, the Nationalist government became acutely aware of the importance of land reform—in particular that they had lost the Chinese Civil War to peasants who had been promised land redistribution. The nationalists began by leasing or selling land inherited from the Japanese to farmers, and continued with the "land to the tiller" program, in which landowners were forced to sell their assets to the government, which would then redistribute that land to the existing tenant farmers. In parallel, farmers were provided loans, training, equipment, and higher-value crops. This land reform improved agricultural yields, boosted rural incomes, and created the necessary surplus to be reinvested into Taiwan's manufacturing sector.

Yin Chung-jung, the primary architect of Taiwan's import-substitution phase, overvalued the currency, cheapening input goods and factory construction costs. Simultaneously, the overvalued currency made Taiwan's agricultural exports less competitive, mimicking the effect of an export tax, incentivizing farmers to instead trade their rice for fertilizer to the government, under the rice-fertilizer barter scheme. The resulting domestic food surplus suppressed food costs, inflation, and in particular wage growth. Much of Taiwan's competitive advantage in its exports-led phase would derive from lower wage costs. A simultaneous policy of tariffs ensured Taiwan's nascent manufacturing sector survived, despite the overvalued currency, and could begin exports.

=== Taiwan Miracle ===
By 1957, and certainly by Yin's death in 1963, Taiwan's import-substitution phase had ended. Taiwan's policy makers rejected industrial deepening, and instead instituted the 19-Point Economic Reform Plan (1960), a framework for Taiwan's export-led model. Tax rebates encouraged exports, while controls on foreign exchange and trade were dropped. Senior KMT leadership worried about potential inflation and weakening of government control, but ultimately saw the plan as necessary for Taiwan's independence from USAID. Subsequent economic development took on a liberal tilt, at least by the region's authoritarian standards. In contrast to Korea's centralized economy, or Japan's oligopolisitic companies, Taiwan encouraged free trade, foreign investment, and domestic entrepreneurship. The establishment of a special economic zone in Kaohsiung Port in 1965 presaged the surge of direct foreign investment and small and medium-sized enterprises (SMEs) in the following years. In addition to the established textiles industry, policy makers identified electronics as a top priority in 1966. When Japanese foreign investment in electronics faltered due to local-content requirements, Taiwanese entrepreneurs filled the gaps. Beneficiaries would come to include Lin Ting-sheng of Tatung Company, Chen Mao-pang of Sampo Corporation, and C. C. Hong of Panasonic Taiwan. By 1970, Taiwan had become a leading destination for overseas Chinese, American, and Japanese investors.

The oil crisis in 1973 prompted Chiang Ching-kuo, then president, to launch the Ten Major Construction Projects. Even prior to 1973, Taiwan's rapid economic growth had strained energy supplies, and was increasingly bottlenecked by poor infrastructure. The national project both stimulated the economy in the immediate aftermath of the oil crisis, and provided the long term energy and transportation infrastructure for Taiwan's continued development. The success of the Ten Projects was followed by the state-led establishment of science parks and export processing zones, notably the Hsinchu Science Park (1981). Thorbecke and Wan rationalize these state interventions, counter to Taiwan's more decentralized economy, as a means to capture 'spill-over' benefits from adopting new technologies, such as knowledge and technology diffusion, or synergistic effects on the entire supply chain. As these benefits may not lead to direct profits for private firms, responsibility fell on the state to construct state of the art facilities and infrastructure.

Although cogent financial policy by the Taiwanese Central Bank and the resilience of SMEs insulated Taiwan from the 1997 Asian financial crisis, Taiwan's economic momentum slowed in the 21st century, owing to slowing global trade growth and multiple financial or trade shocks. After the bursting of the Dot-Com Bubble, Taiwan experienced blow back effects from the corresponding financial crisis. A recovery made possible by post-SARS stimulus was soon followed by the Great Recession, where Taiwan's exports-led economy again faced a downturn due to a reduction in global demand. Economic malaise continued into the 2010s with the US-China Trade War and COVID-19 pandemic. In parallel, Taiwan's economy faced longer-term structural obstacles. For one, both foreign and Taiwanese companies increasingly outsourced labor to mainland China. For two, investors feared Taiwan's energy scarcity, as an anti-nuclear lobby prevented the construction of Taiwan's fourth nuclear power plant.

=== AI Boom ===
Taiwan, as one of the leading producers of computer microchip and high-tech electronics, has benefited from the Artificial Intelligence Boom. Taiwan's economy grew 8.68% in 2025, outperforming peer economies in Asia. UBS estimates that by 2028, Taiwan's economy will produce the most new millionaires in the world. However, the economic growth is highly concentrated in the tech companies such as TSMC, with smaller and more unproductive small businesses that account for around 80% of Taiwan's employment seeing much slower growth. The growth has made Taiwan's economy to become heavily reliant on semiconductors; around 80% of Taiwan's exports were semiconductors and other AI-related gear in 2026, compared to around half before the COVID-19 pandemic, while Taiwan's non-semiconductor exports have fallen by 40% since 2022 in face of rising competition from China.

Annual median household income in Taiwan by township/city or district in 2016

== Sectors ==
=== Industry ===
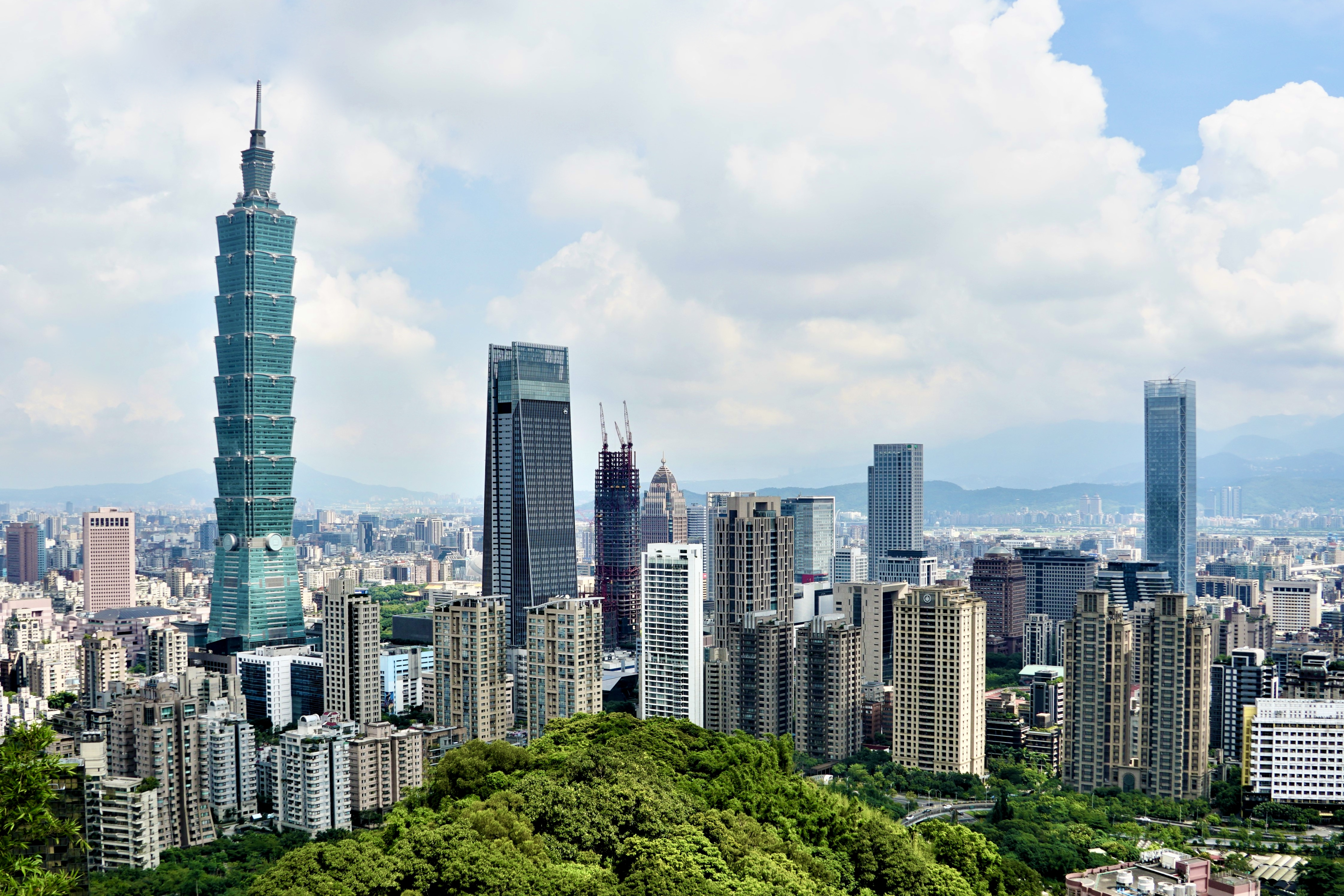
Skyline of modern skyscrapers in Xinyi Special District, Taipei.

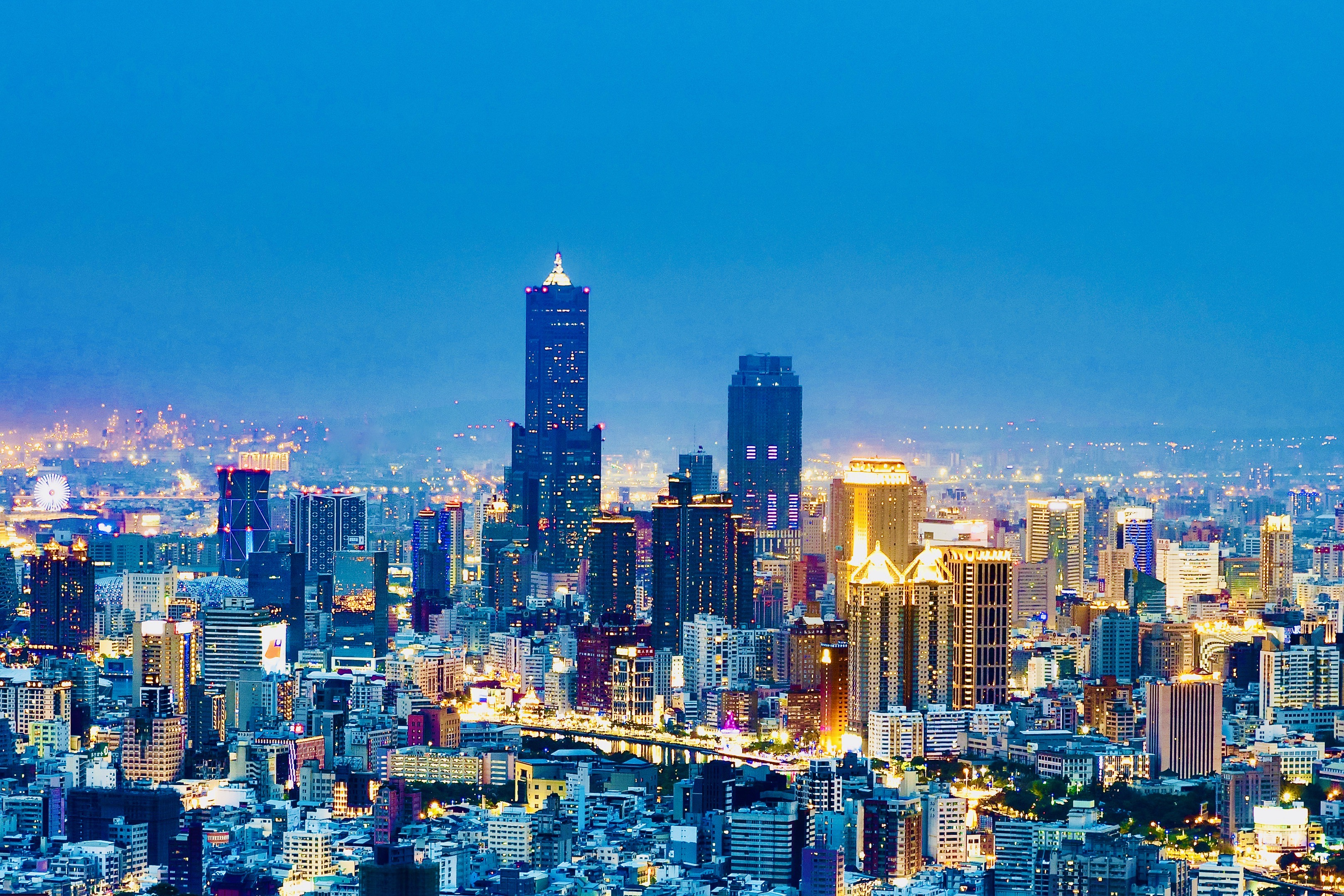
Kaohsiung skyline.

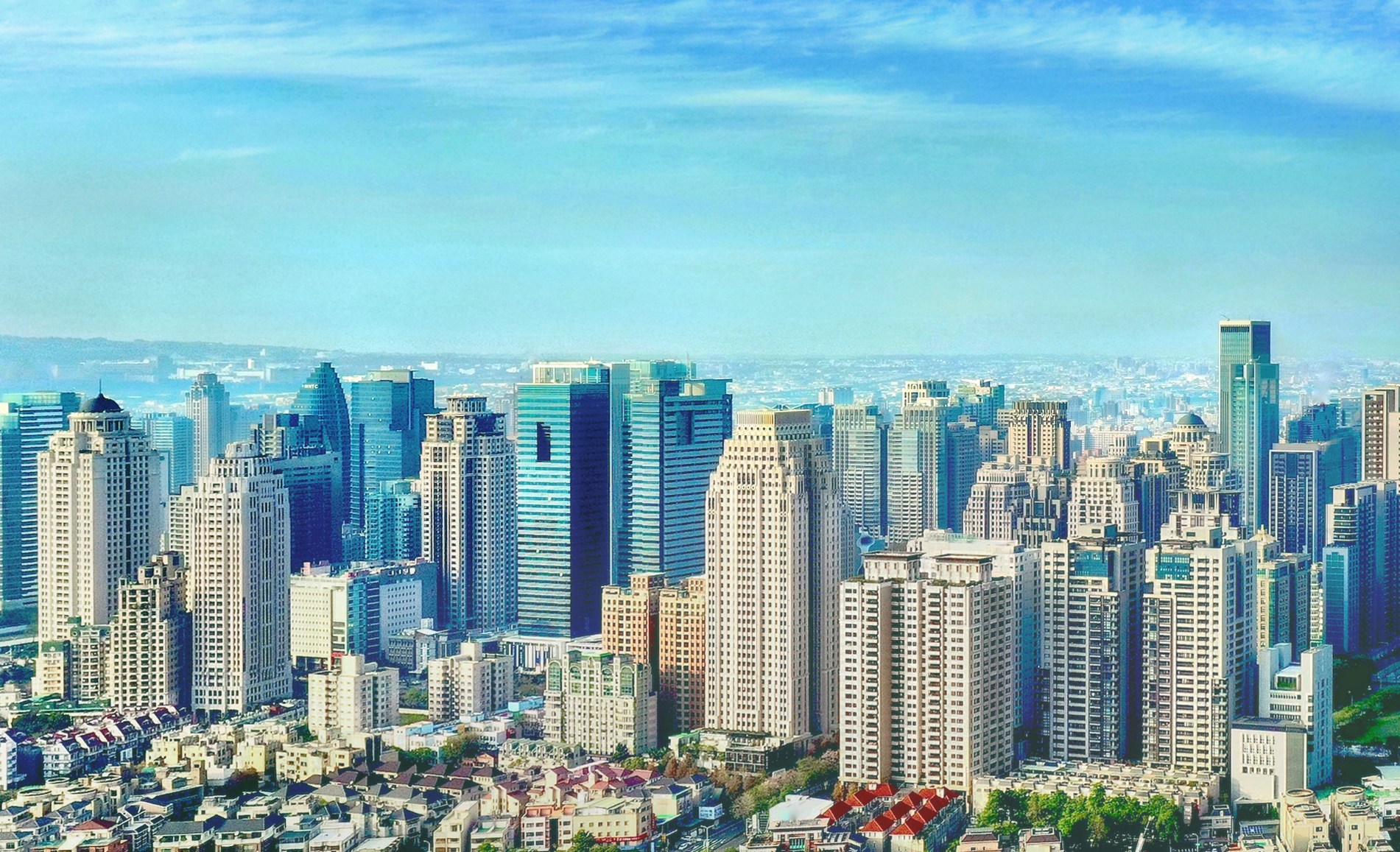
Taichung's 7th Redevelopment Zone

At 38%, industry in Taiwan makes up a sizeable portion of GDP. As China became a destination for low-cost labor, many Taishang off-shored traditional industries, hollowing out domestic manufacturing in the late 1990s and early 2000s. In response, Taiwan launched or legislated multiple industrial plans, which specified capital and technology-intensive industries for development. In 2024, the National Development Council approved the Five Trusted Industry Sectors, which specified semiconductors, AI, defense, cybersecurity, and communications as the primary focus for future industry.

==== Semiconductor ====
The semiconductor industry, including IC manufacturing, design, and packing, forms a major part of Taiwan's IT industry. Due to its strong capabilities in OEM wafer manufacturing and a complete industry supply chain, Taiwan has been able to distinguish itself from its competitors. The sector output reached US$39 billion in 2009, ranking first in global market share in IC manufacturing, packaging, and testing, and second in IC design.

Taiwan Semiconductor Manufacturing Company (TSMC) and United Microelectronics Corporation (UMC) are the two largest contract chipmakers in the world, while MediaTek is the fourth-largest fabless supplier globally. In 1987, TSMC pioneered the fabless foundry model, reshaping the global semiconductor industry. From ITRI's first 3-inch wafer fabrication plant built in 1977 and the founding of UMC in 1980, the industry has developed into a world leader with 40 fabs in operation by 2002.

In 2007, the semiconductor industry overtook that of the United States, second only to Japan. Although the 2008 financial crisis affected sales and exports, the industry has rebounded with companies posting record profits for 2010. The international industrial forecast of semiconductor manufacturing, which is the flagship industry of the economy of Taiwan that faces immense competition ahead with its American counterparts. By 2020 Taiwan was the unmatched leader of the global semiconductor industry with TSMC alone accounting for more than 50% of the global market.

==== Information technology ====
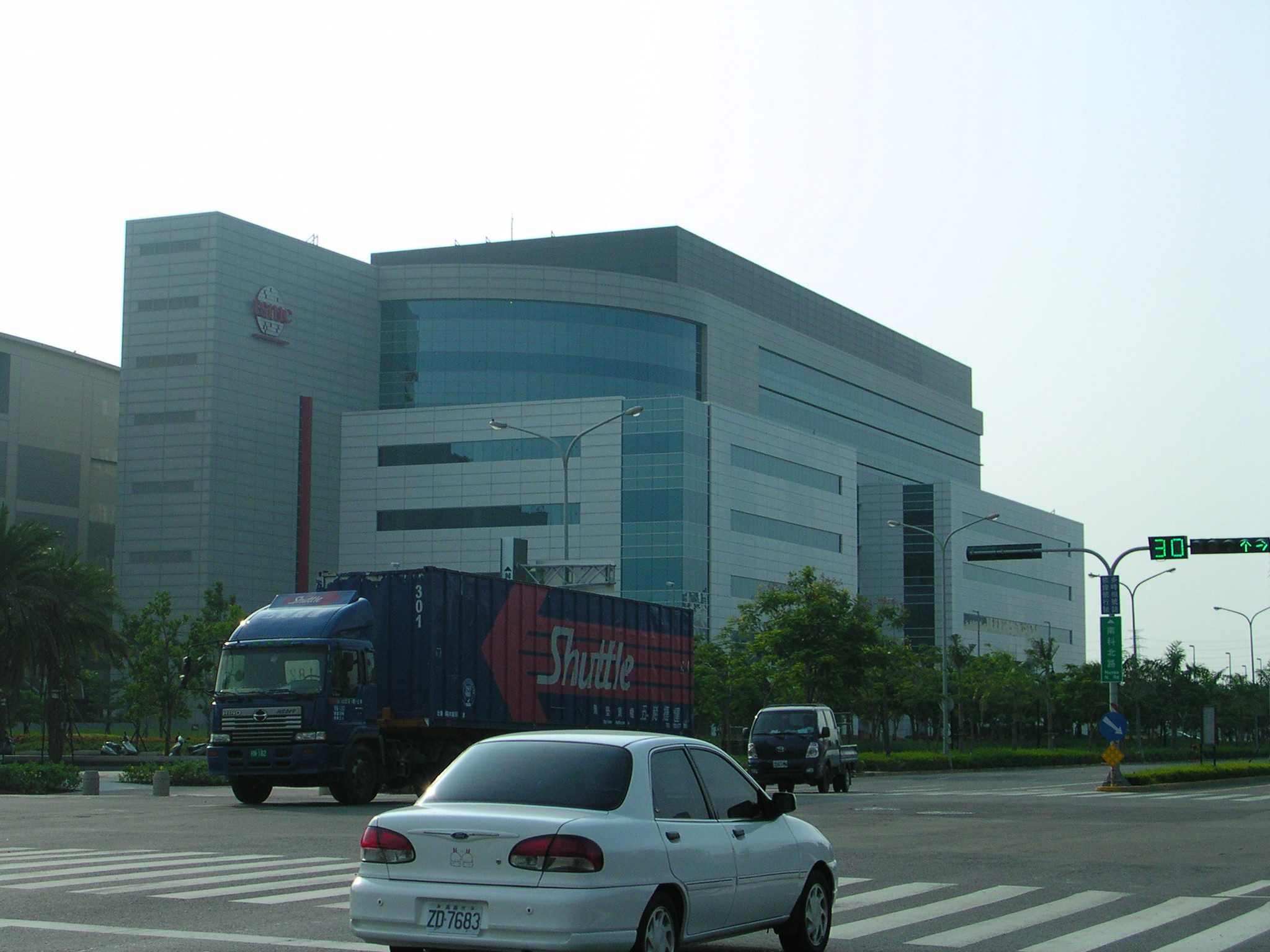
A TSMC factory in Tainan Science Park, one of the many companies that make up Taiwan's IT industry

Taiwan's information technology industry has played an important role in the worldwide IT market over the last 20 years. In 1960, the electronics industry in Taiwan was virtually nonexistent. However, with the government's focus on development of expertise with high technology, along with marketing and management knowledge to establish its own industries, companies such as TSMC and UMC were established. The industry used its industrial resources and product management experience to cooperate closely with major international suppliers to become the research and development hub of the Asia-Pacific region.

The structure of the industry in Taiwan includes a handful of companies at the top along with many small and medium-sized enterprises (SME) which account for 85% of industrial output. These SMEs usually produce products on an original equipment manufacturer (OEM) or original design manufacturer (ODM) basis, resulting in less resources spent on research and development. Due to the emphasis of the OEM/ODM model, companies are usually unable to make in-depth assessments for investment, production, and marketing of new products, instead relying upon importation of key components and advanced technology from the United States and Japan. Twenty of the top information and communication technology (ICT) companies have International Procurement Offices set up in Taiwan. As a signer of the Information Technology Agreement, Taiwan phased out tariffs on IT products since 1 January 2002.

Taiwan is a hub for global computing, telecommunications, and data management with a number of large server farms operating in the country. Google's data center in Changhua is believed to be the largest in Asia. Taiwan is well connected to the global undersea fiber optic cable network and serves as a substantial traffic interchange.

==== Automotive ====
The automotive industry in Taiwan is significant, with Taiwanese firms increasingly invested in automotive electrification; 75% of Tesla, Inc.'s suppliers are Taiwanese.

==== Consumer goods ====
Taiwan is a major producer of sporting goods with NT$59.8 billion of production in 2020, 40–50% of production is indoor fitness equipment. Taiwan is the global leader in golf equipment with 80% of global production concentrated in the country. The four largest golf OEM are all Taiwanese, however, these firms are increasingly selling products under their own brands.

The Taiwanese bicycle industry is significant. Production peaked at ten million units a year in the 1980s but declined as low end production moved abroad and domestic manufactures moved upmarket. Giant Bicycles and Merida Bikes are the largest Taiwanese bicycle manufacturers. Mountain bikes and ebikes make up much of contemporary production. In 2022 the bicycle industry hit a record $6 billion US in revenue.

==== Construction ====
Taiwan's construction sector has faced labour shortages as the population ages. Employment of migrant workers in construction was long restricted, but from 1 August 2023 the government allowed qualifying construction and engineering companies to recruit an initial 8,000 migrant workers, with a possible expansion to 15,000 in a second phase. In 2024, the Railway Bureau said more than 10 percent of civil engineering vacancies were unfilled, and labour shortages pushed the opening of the first phase of the Wanda line from 2025 to 2027.

==== Defense and aerospace ====
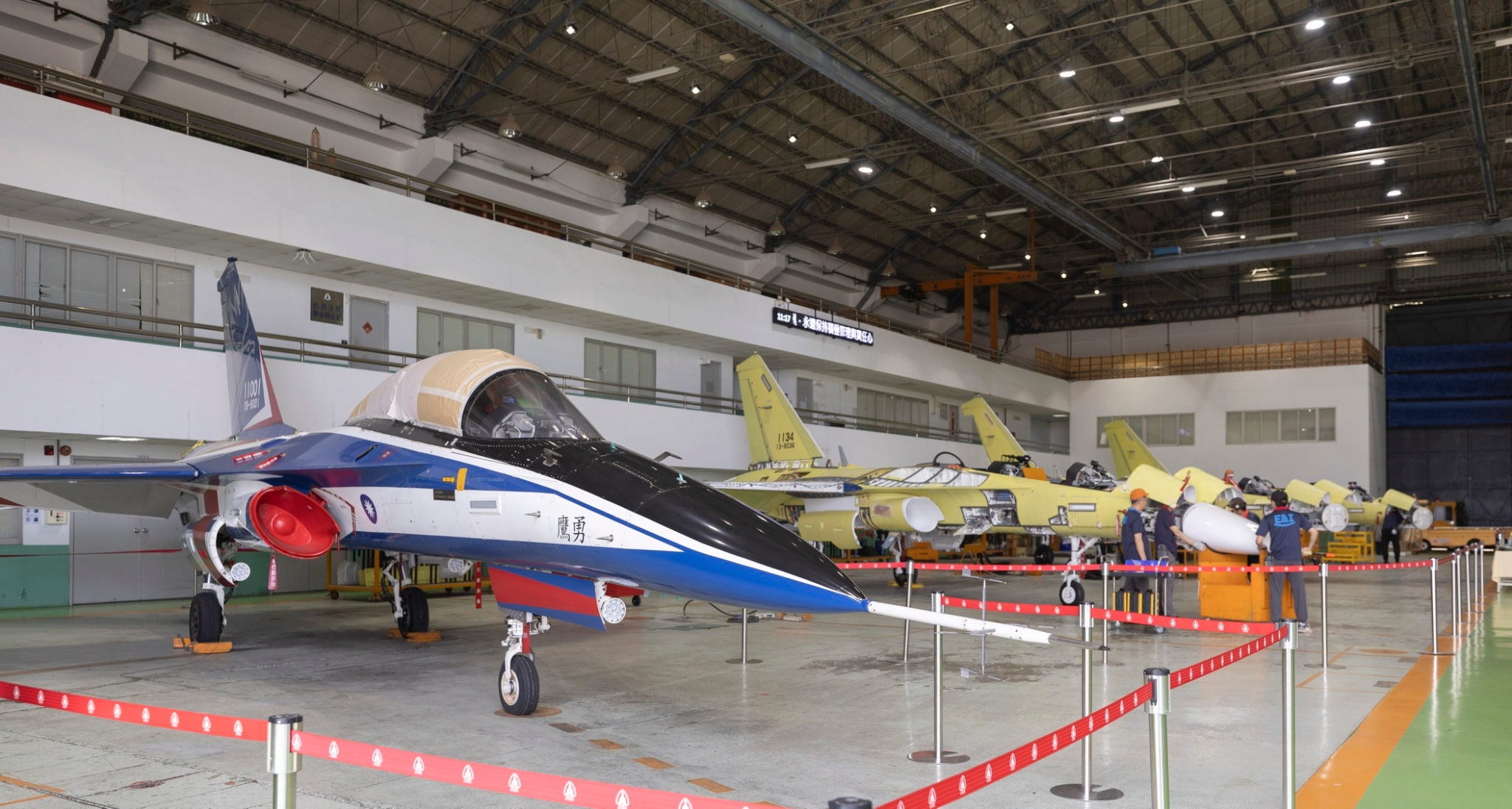
AIDC T-5 Brave Eagle production

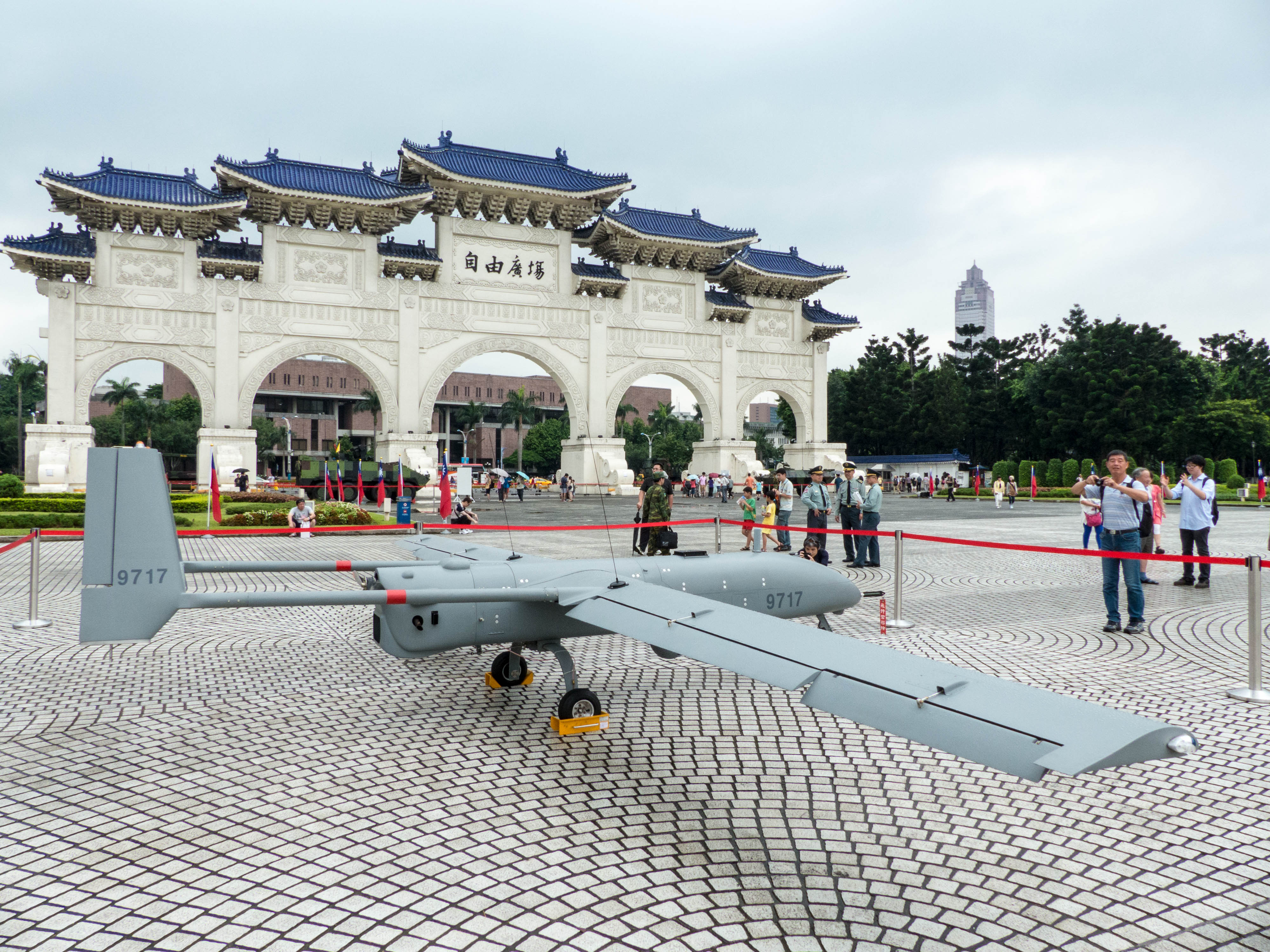
NCSIST Albatross 9717 on display at CKS Memorial Hall

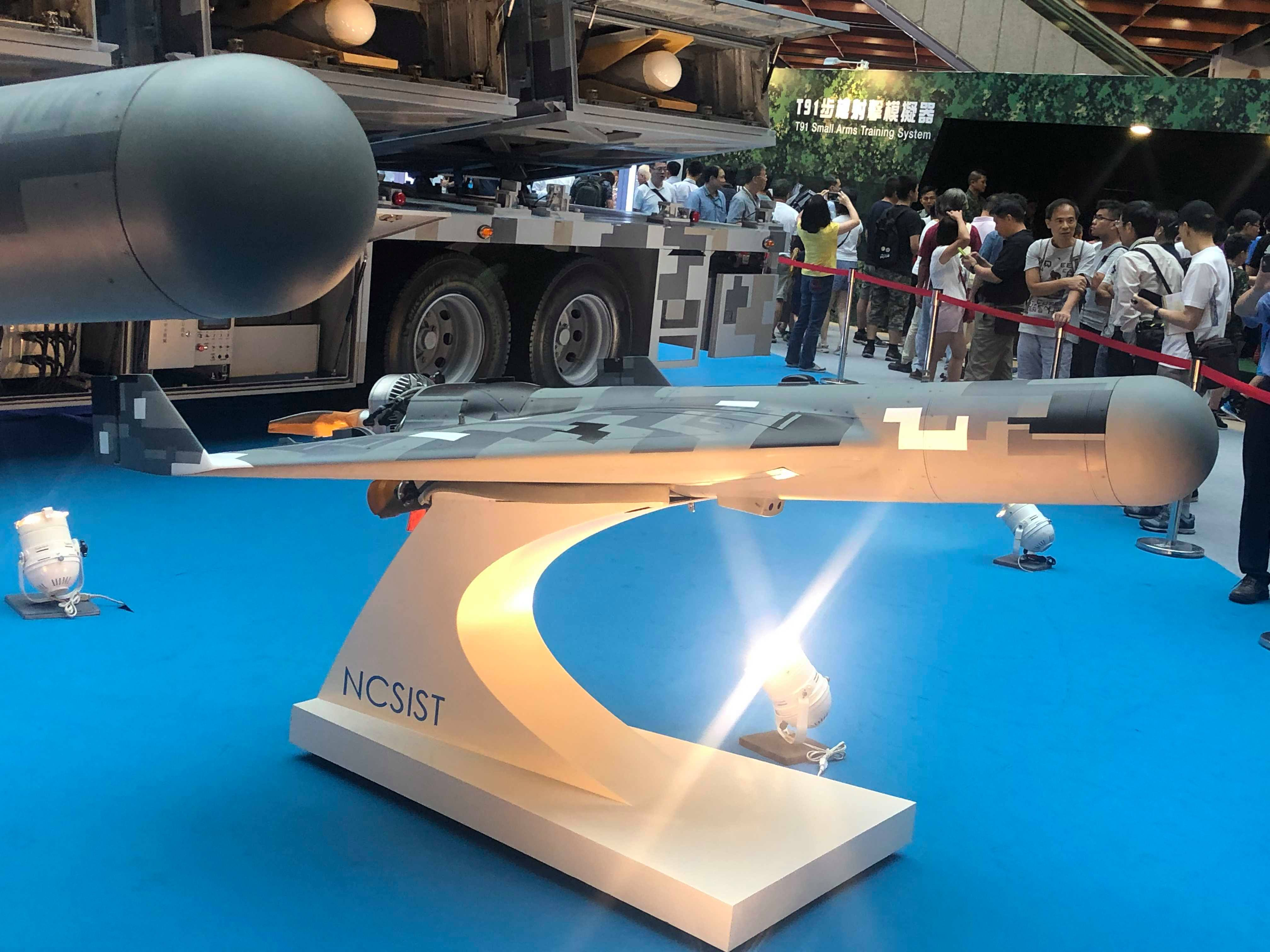
Chien Hsiang Loitering munition designed by NCSIST

The defense industry of Taiwan is a strategically important sector and a significant employer. They primarily supply weapons and platforms to the Republic of China Armed Forces with few major weapons systems exported abroad. Taiwanese defense industry has produced fighter aircraft, missile systems, surface ships, radars, rocket artillery, armored vehicles, and small arms.

The aerospace industry in Taiwan is a growing sector of civil aviation, defense, and space-related research and development.

As of 2023, Taiwan's aerospace industry employs over 10,000 people and generates over US$4 billion in annual revenue. Major players include Aerospace Industrial Development Corporation, Aero Industry Development Center, and National Chung-Shan Institute of Science and Technology (NCSIST), the latter of which focuses primarily on defense systems. Taiwan also is a significant supplier of aircraft components, particularly for international companies like Boeing, Airbus, Bombardier, and Lockheed Martin. Exports include engine casings, landing gear components, avionics, and flight control systems. According to the Taiwan Aerospace Industry Association (TAIA), approximately 70% of Taiwan’s aerospace output is destined for export markets.

==== Steel and heavy manufacturing ====
Taiwan, as of 2017, is the world's thirteenth-largest steel exporter. In 2018, Taiwan exported 12.2 million metric tons of steel, a one percent increase from 12.0 million metric tons in 2017. Taiwan's exports represented about 3 percent of all steel exported globally in 2017, based on available data. The volume of Taiwan's 2018 steel exports was one-sixth that of the world's largest exporter, China, and nearly one-third that of the second-largest exporter, Japan. In value terms, steel represented just 3.6 percent of the total amount of goods Taiwan exported in 2018. Taiwan exports steel to more than 130 countries and territories. Over the decade from 2009 to 2019, Taiwan grew its steel exports by 24%. In 2018, the US imported 300,000 metric tons of pipe and tube products. Taiwan has developed a vast export trade to its most proximate neighbors in flat products. Taiwan's stainless steel exports numbered 2018 about 500,000 metric tons.

Taiwan is the fourth largest exporter of machine tools and machine tool components in the world. The greater Taichung area is home to a cluster of machine tool manufacturers.

Taiwanese company Techman Robot Inc. is the world's second largest producer of cobots.

==== Maritime industries ====
In 2017, Taiwan exported one hundred and sixty-two yachts. In 2018, Taiwan was the fourth largest yacht building nation by feet of yacht built after Italy, The Netherlands and Turkey. Taiwan is one of the largest fishing nations on earth and the associated fish processing industry is also significant.

==== Mining ====
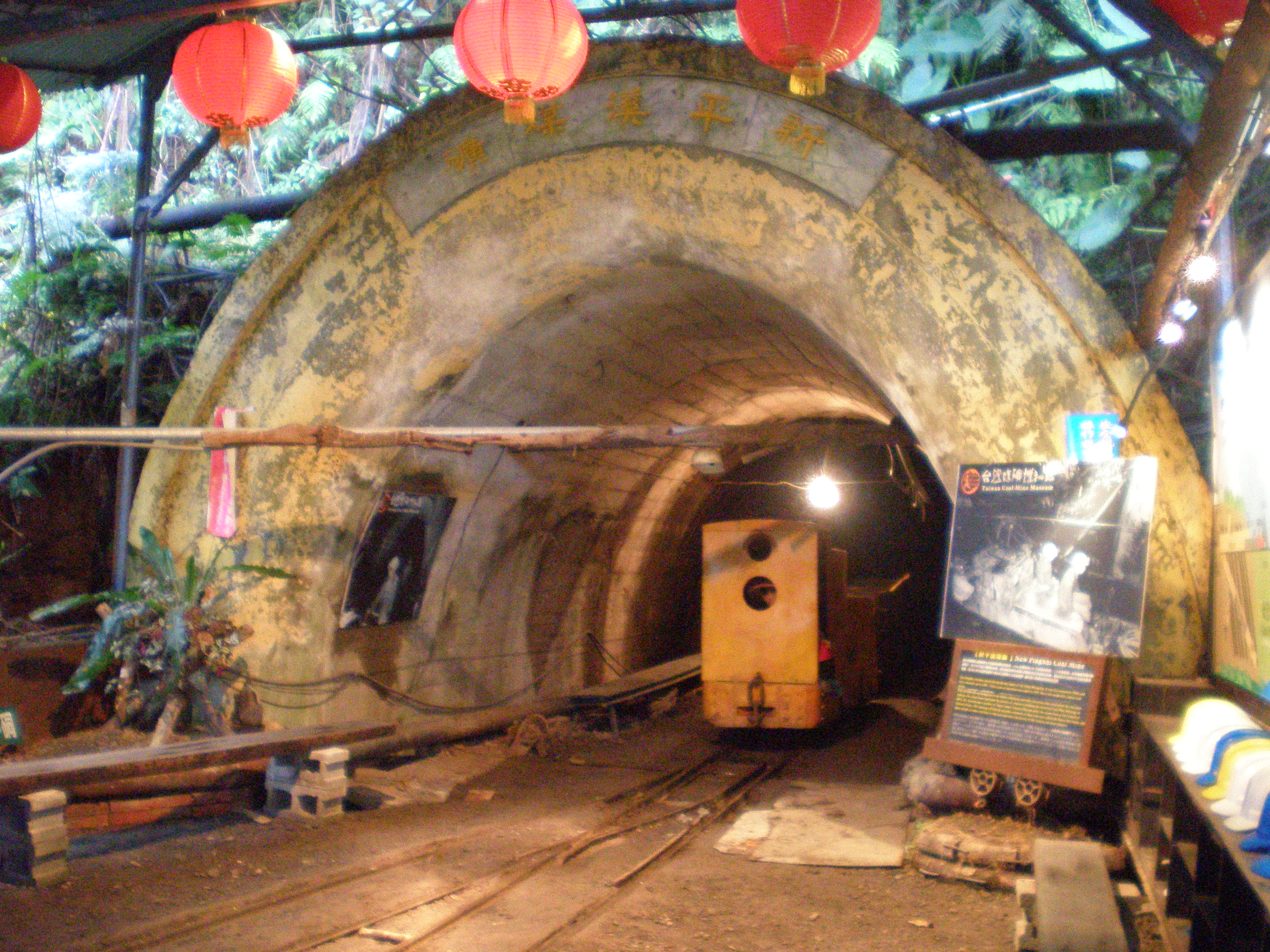
Taiwan Coal Mine Museum in Pingxi, New Taipei

Mining has been practiced in Taiwan for hundreds of years. Sulfur was an early important resource collected on the island. Coal mining expanded in the 19th century to keep up with demand from increased foreign trade. Heavy industry was further expanded under Japanese rule, but air raids towards the end of World War II decimated mining infrastructure, falling below 19th century production levels. Copper mining expanded in the mid-20th century, but ended in the 1980s following a global collapse in the price of copper.

Today, Taiwan produces cement, marble, gold, oil and natural gas. Mining activities in Taiwan are regulated by the Bureau of Mines of the Ministry of Economic Affairs.

=== Agriculture, fishing and forestry ===
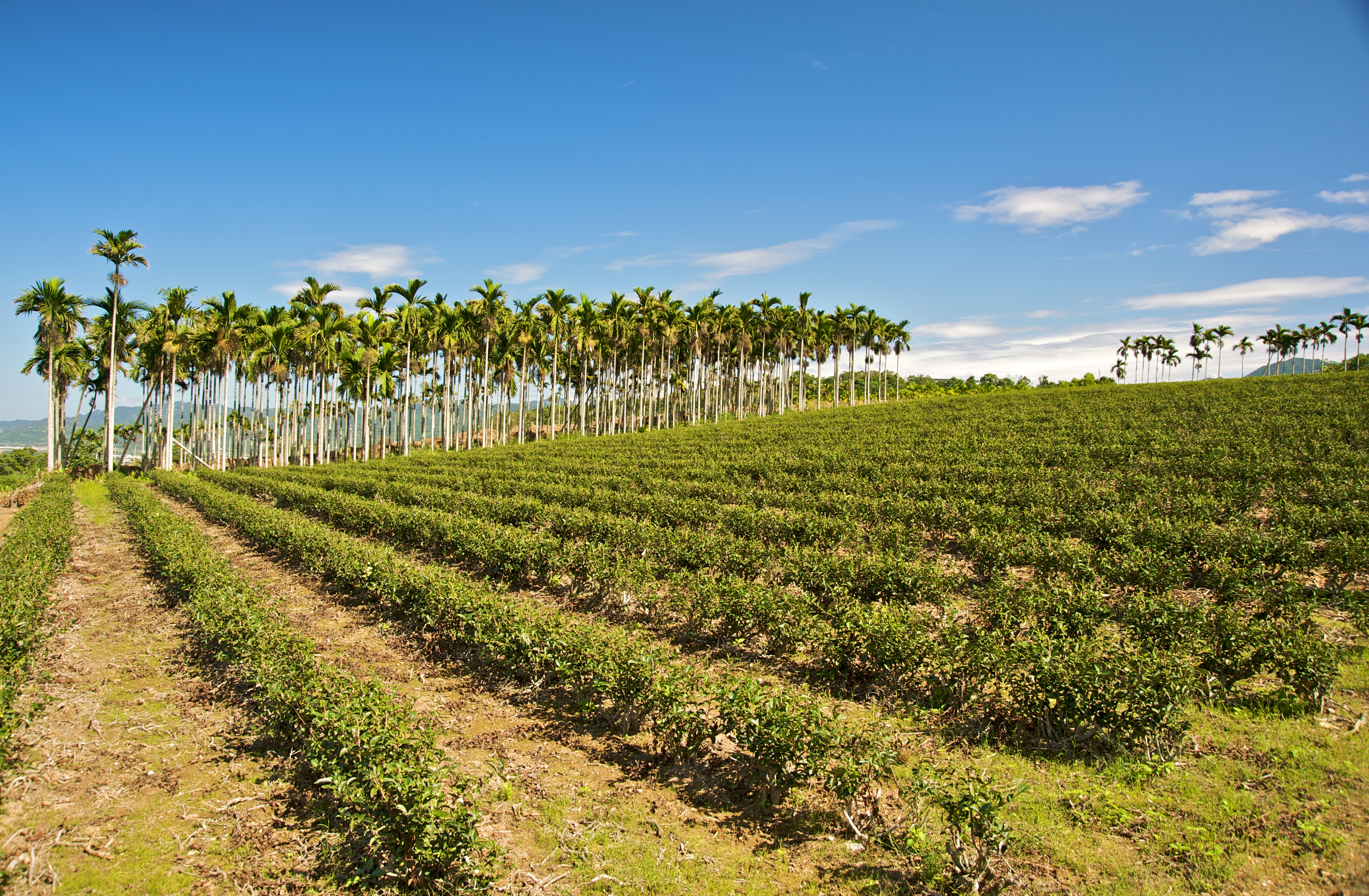
A tea plantation in Ruisui, Hualien, part of Taiwan's agricultural industry which served as the backbone for its economic miracle

Agriculture has served as a strong foundation for Taiwan's economic miracle. It contributes 3% to Taiwan's GDP and the service sector makes up 73% of the economy. After retrocession from Japan in 1945, the government announced a long-term strategy of "developing industry through agriculture, and developing agriculture through industry". As such, agriculture became the foundation for Taiwan's economic development during early years and served as an anchor for growth in industry and commerce. Whereas in 1951, agricultural production accounted for 35.8% of Taiwan's GDP, by 2013, it had been vastly surpassed, and its NT$475.90 billion accounted for only 1.69% of the GDP. As of 2013, Taiwan's agriculture was a mixture of crops (47.88%), livestock (31.16%), fishery (20.87%), and forestry (0.09%). Since its accession into the World Trade Organization and the subsequent trade liberalization, the government has implemented new policies to develop the sector into a more competitive and modernized green industry.

Although only about one-quarter of Taiwan's land area is suitable for farming, virtually all farmland is intensely cultivated, with some areas suitable for two and even three crops a year. However, increases in agricultural production have been much slower than industrial growth. Agricultural modernization has been inhibited by the small size of farms and the lack of investment in better facilities and training to develop more profitable businesses. Taiwan's agricultural population has steadily decreased from 1974 to 2002, prompting the Council of Agriculture to introduce modern farm management, provide technical training, and offer counseling for better production and distribution systems. Promotion of farm mechanization has helped to alleviate labor shortages while increasing productivity; both rice and sugar cane production are completely mechanized. Taiwan's main crops are rice, sugar cane, fruits (many of them tropical), and vegetables. Although self-sufficient in rice production, Taiwan imports large amounts of wheat, mostly from the United States. Meat production and consumption have risen sharply, reflecting a high standard of living. Taiwan has exported large amounts of frozen pork, although this was affected by an outbreak of hoof and mouth disease in 1997. Other agricultural exports include fish, aquaculture, and sea products, canned and frozen vegetables, and grain products. Taiwan has been a member of the World Trade Organization, under the name Chinese Taipei, since 1 January 2002.

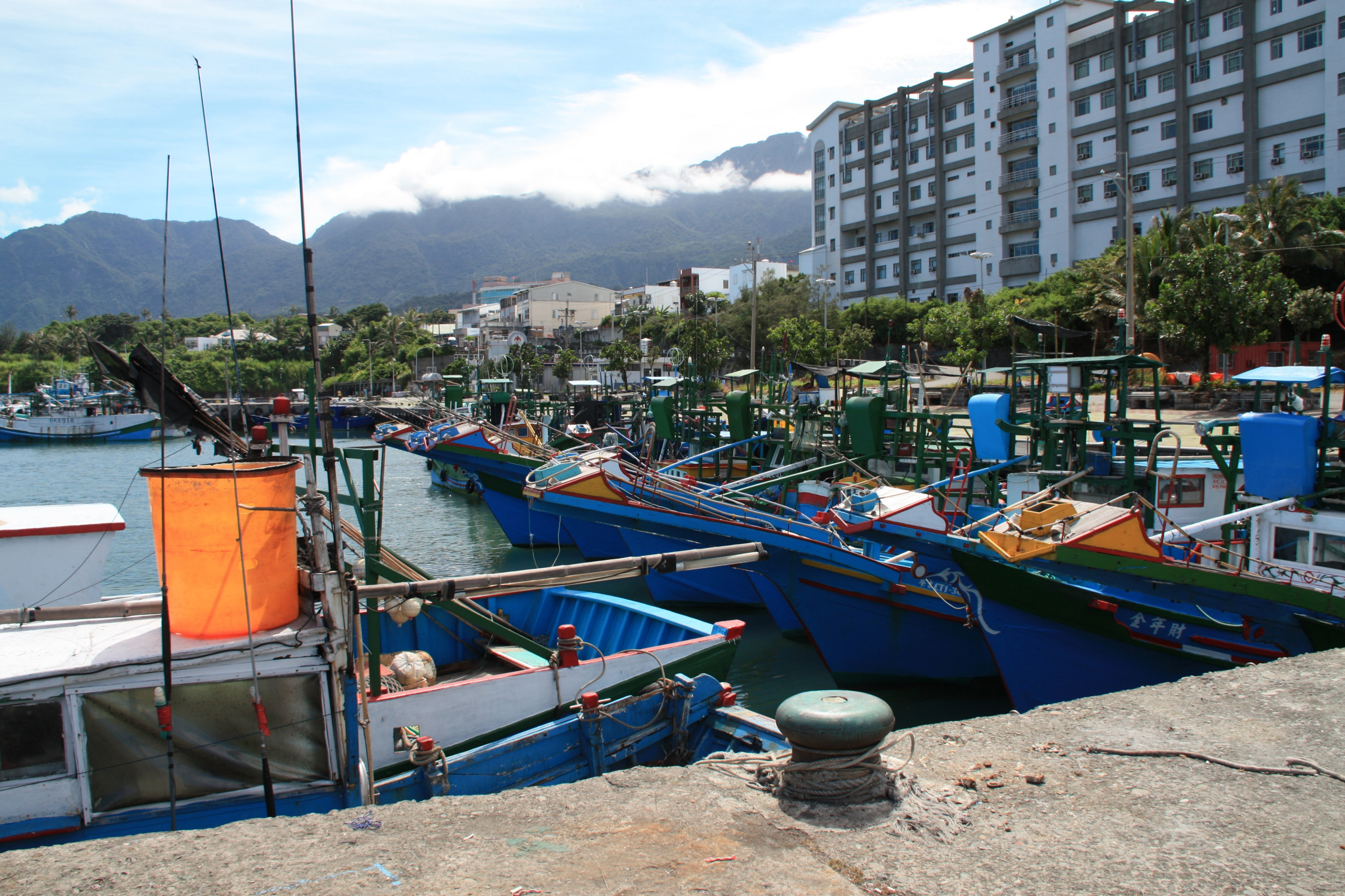
Chenggong Fishing Harbor in 2010

With a coastline of 1566 km, Taiwan is one of the largest fishing nations on earth. Geographically, Taiwan is surrounded by water and lies about 180 kilometres (112 miles) across the Taiwan Strait from the southeastern coast of the Mainland China. The East China Sea is to the north of the island, the Philippine Sea to its east, the Luzon Strait directly to its south, and the South China Sea to its southwest. It also controls a number of smaller islands, including the Penghu archipelago in the Taiwan Strait, Kinmen and Matsu in Fuchien near the Mainland coast, as well as Pratas and Taiping in the South China Sea.

More than one third of the worlds longline tuna fishing vessels are operated by Taiwanese companies with the total strength of the distant waters fishing fleet at more than 2,000 vessels. Taiwanese conglomerate FCF Co, Ltd. is one of the largest tuna traders in the world moving more than half million tons a year, in 2019 they acquired American company Bumble Bee Foods for close to 1 billion dollars. Taiwan's ocean fisheries employs roughly 350,000 people and there are 130,000 fishing households in Taiwan. The Taiwanese fishing industry was estimated to be worth approximately two billion dollars in 2019, and the seafood industry to be worth 1.3 billion dollars a year in 2020.

=== Infrastructure ===
==== Energy ====
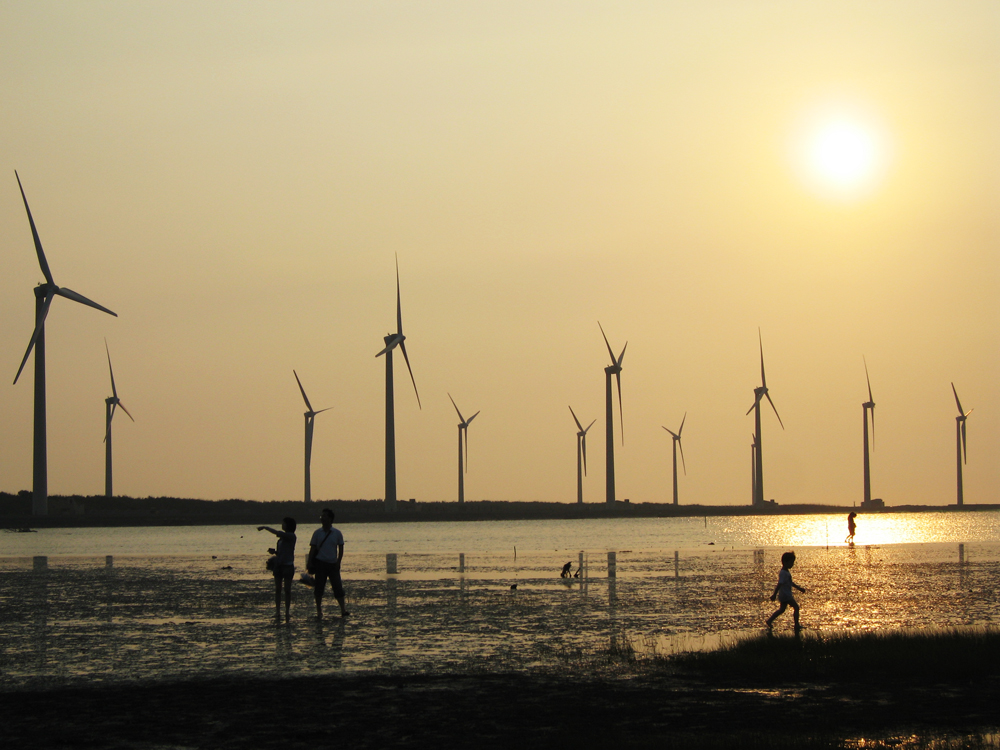
Wind turbines, such as these in Qingshui, Taichung, are part of the government's efforts in renewable energy commercialisation

Due to the lack of natural resources on the island, Taiwan is forced to import many of its energy needs (currently at 98%). Imported energy totaled US$11.52 billion in 2002, accounting for 4.1% of its GDP. Although the industrial sector has traditionally been Taiwan's largest energy consumer, its share has dropped in recent years from 62% in 1986 to 58% in 2002. Taiwan's energy consumption is dominated by crude oil and petroleum products (48.52%), followed by coal (29.2%), natural gas (12.23%), nuclear power (8.33%), and hydroelectric power (0.28%).

The island is also heavily dependent on imported oil, with 72% of its crude oil coming from the Middle East in 2002. Although the Taiwan Power Company (Taipower), a state-owned enterprise, is in charge of providing electricity for the Taiwan area, a 1994 measure has allowed independent power producers (IPPs) to provide up to 20% of the island's energy needs. Indonesia and Malaysia supply most of Taiwan's natural gas needs. It currently has three operational nuclear power plants. A fourth plant under construction was mothballed in 2014.

Although Taiwan's per capita energy use is on par with neighboring Asian countries, in July 2005 the Ministry of Economic Affairs announced plans to cut 170 million tons of carbon dioxide emissions by 2025. In 2010, carbon dioxide emissions have been reduced by 5.14 million metric tons. In order to further reduce emissions, the government also plans to increase energy efficiency by 2% each year through 2020. In addition, by 2015, emissions are planned to be reduced by 7% compared to 2005 levels.

Taiwan is the world's 4th largest producer of solar-powered batteries and largest LED manufacturer by volume. In 2010, Taiwan had over 1.66 million square meters of solar heat collectors installed, with an installation density that ranks it as third in the world. The government has already built 155 sets of wind turbines capable of producing 281.6 MW of electricity, and additional projects are planned or under construction. Renewable energy accounts for 6.8% of Taiwan's energy usage as of 2010. In 2010, the green energy sector generated US$10.97 billion in production value. The government also announced plans to invest US$838 million for renewable energy promotion and an additional US$635 million for research and development.

==== Transport ====
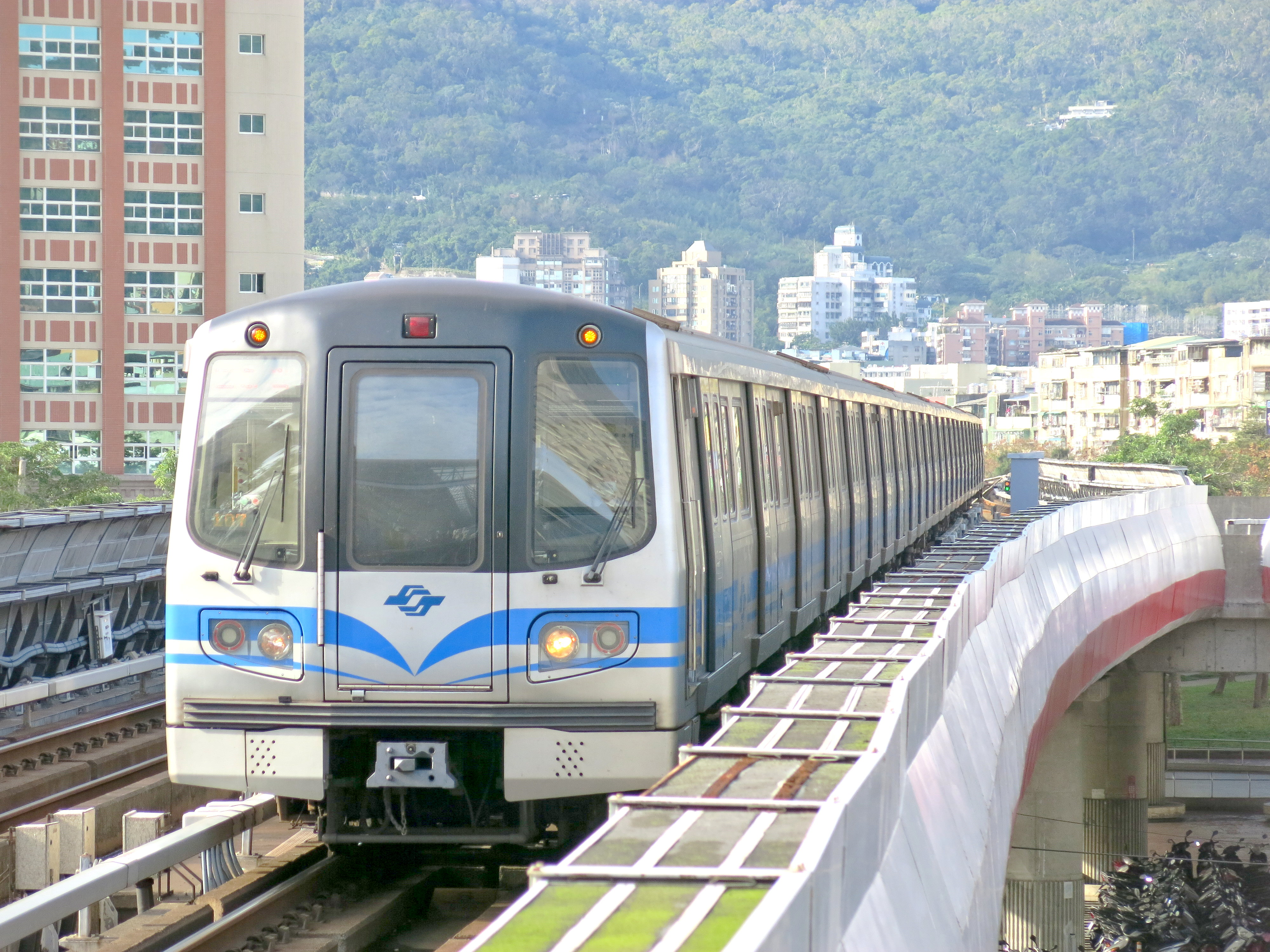
The Taipei Metro

Transportation in Taiwan is overseen by the Ministry of Transportation and Communications and comprises a highly developed network of land, air, and sea transport systems.

==== Water supply and sanitation ====
Water supply and sanitation in Taiwan is characterized by uneven distribution of precipitation and a dense population.

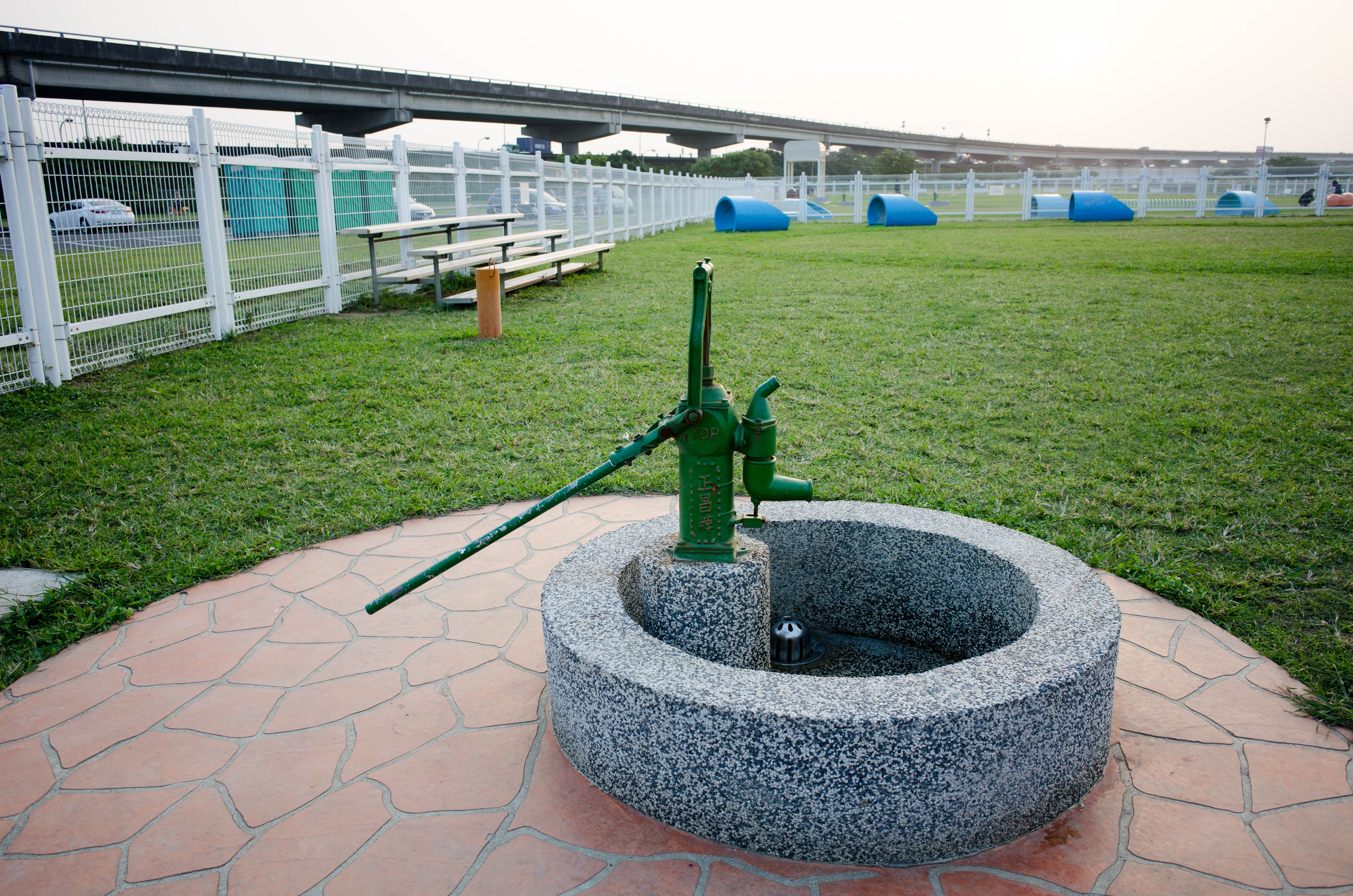
Piston water pump at the Yingfeng Riverside Park in Taipei.

=== Services ===
==== Banking and finance ====
Banking in Taiwan began in earnest during the Japanese colonial period however a number of traditional financial institutions were inherited from Taiwan’s diverse colonial and commercial past. Today Taiwan has a modern banking industry and an advanced financial industry.

==== Education ====
The educational system in Taiwan is the responsibility of the Ministry of Education. The system produces pupils with some of the highest test scores in the world, especially in mathematics and science.

In 2015, Taiwanese students achieved one of the world's best results in mathematics, science and literacy, as tested by the Programme for International Student Assessment (PISA), a worldwide evaluation of 15-year-old school pupils' scholastic performance. Taiwan is one of the top-performing OECD countries in reading literacy, mathematics and sciences with the average student scoring 523.7, compared with the OECD average of 493, placing it seventh in the world and has one of the world's most highly educated labor forces among OECD countries. Current law mandates twelve years of schooling. Before the 12-year educational system was implemented in 2014, 95 percent junior high school students go on to a senior vocational high school, trade school, junior college, or university.

In Taiwan, adhering to the Confucian paradigm for education where parents believe that receiving a good education is a very high priority for Taiwanese families and an important goal in their children's life. Many parents in Taiwan believe that effort and persistence matters more than innate ability if their children want to receive better grades in school. These beliefs are shared by the teachers and guidance counselors and the schools as they regularly keep the parents abreast on their child's overall academic performance in the school. Many parents have high expectations for their children, emphasize academic achievement and actively intervene in their children's academic progress by making sure that their children receive top grades and would go on to great sacrifices including borrowing money to put their child through university.

Due to its role in promoting Taiwan's economic development, high test results, and high university entrance rate, Taiwan's education system has been praised. 45 percent of Taiwanese aged 25 to 64 hold a bachelor's degree or higher. However, the education system has been criticized for its overemphasis on rote memorization and excessive academic pressure it places on students. Students in Taiwan are faced with immense pressure to succeed academically from their parents, teachers, peers, and society in order to secure prestigious white collar job positions while eschewing vocational education, critical thinking, and creativity. With a narrow bandwidth of prestigious job positions and a far greater number of university graduates seeking them, many have been employed in lesser positions with salaries far below their expectations. Taiwan's universities have also been criticized for not keeping up with the technological trends and employment demands in its fast moving job market referring to a skills mismatch cited by a number of self assessed and overeducated university graduates. In addition, the Taiwanese government has been criticized for undermining the economy as it has been unable to create enough jobs to support the demands of the numerous unemployed university graduates.

==== Healthcare ====
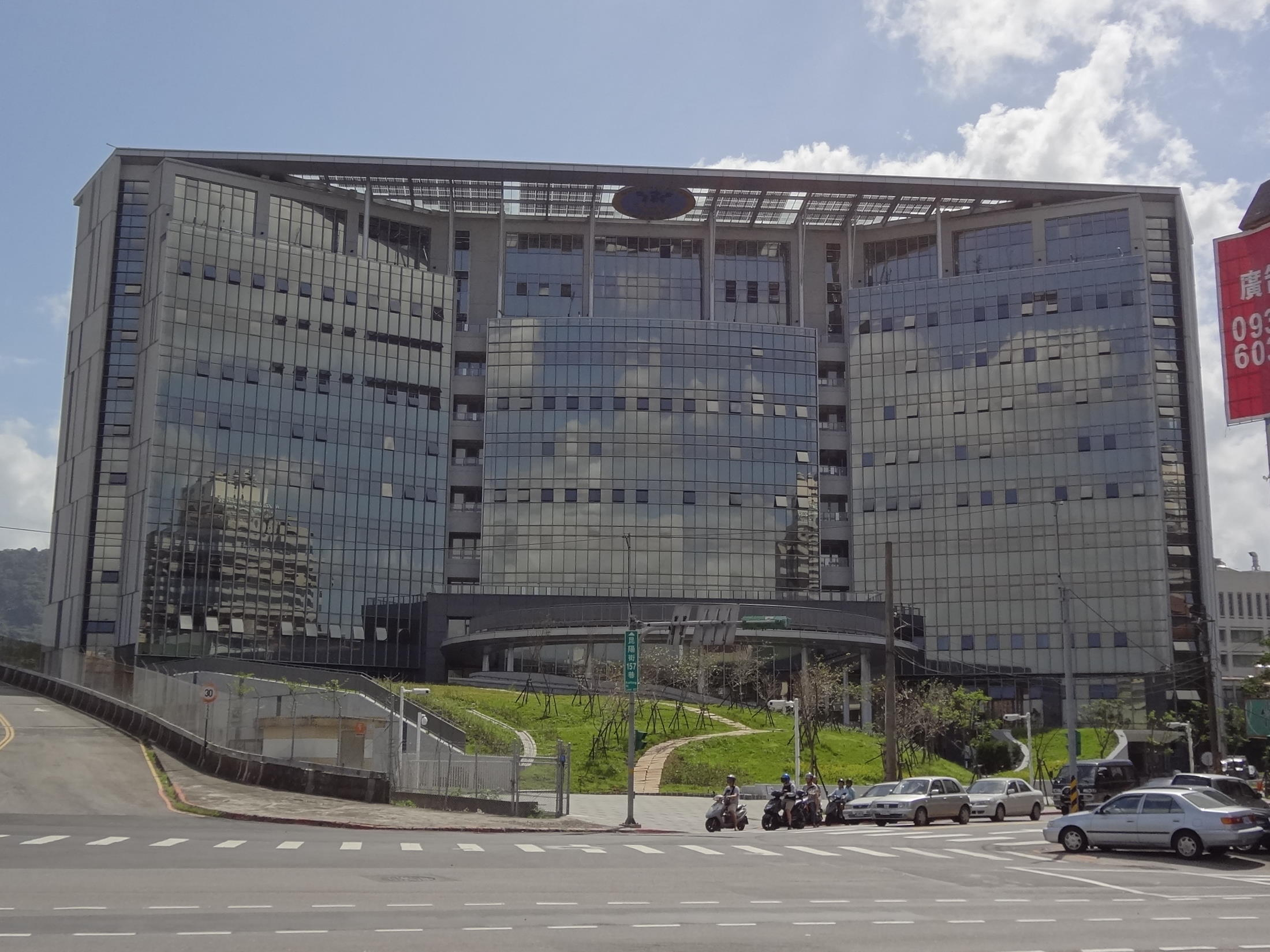
Ministry of Health and Welfare (Taiwan)

Emblem of National Health Insurance

Healthcare in Taiwan is administered by the Ministry of Health and Welfare of the Executive Yuan. As with other developed economies, Taiwanese people are well-nourished but face such health problems as chronic obesity and heart disease. In 2023, Taiwan had 2.3 physicians and 7.3 hospital beds per 1,000 population. There were 476 hospitals and 23,421 clinics in the country. Per capita health expenditures totaled US$2,522 in 2023. Health expenditures constituted 7.8% of the gross domestic product (GDP) in 2023; 63% of the expenditures were from public funds. Overall life expectancy in 2025 is 80.94 years.

Recent major health issues include the SARS crisis in 2003, though the island was later declared safe by the World Health Organization (WHO). In 2020, Taiwan was hit by the COVID-19 pandemic, experiencing four waves of widespread community transmission between January 2020 and March 2023. It successfully contained the disease in the first two years but shifted its control strategy from containment to mitigation in April 2022 when Omicron infections surged in the community.

According to the Numbeo Health Care Index in 2025, Taiwan has the best healthcare system in the world, scoring 86.5 out of 100, a slight increase from 86 the previous year. This marked the seventh consecutive year that Taiwan has ranked first in the Numbeo Health Care Index.

==== Housing and real estate ====
Public housing in Taiwan (臺灣公共住宅) has been a key component of the Taiwan government’s efforts to provide affordable housing since the post-World War II era. Public housing development in Taiwan initially aimed to address the needs of a growing population and the ageing condition of military-dependent housing. Over the decades, the focus has evolved in response to housing market changes, economic growth, and urbanization.

==== Retail and hospitality ====
According to the Ministry of Economic Affairs, Taiwan's retail sales totalled NT$4.84 trillion (US$154.3 billion) in 2025, ending a nine-year run of annual growth; excluding motor vehicles and motorcycles, retail revenue would have risen 1.5 percent. Food and beverage revenue grew 2.9 percent to NT$1.07 trillion. By December 2023, Taiwan had 13,706 convenience stores, about one for every 1,703 residents, the second-highest density after South Korea, and their revenue reached a record NT$412.6 billion that year.

==== Telecommunications and media ====
Telecommunications in Taiwan comprise the following communication media, deployed in the Taiwan Area of the Republic of China and regulated by the National Communications Commission of the Executive Yuan.

Since the mid-1970s there has been an accelerating shift from traditional personal services (small shops and restaurants) to modern personal services (department stores and hotels) and modern commercial services (finance and communications).

Domestic television has long carried many foreign programs, and liberalization of import restrictions in the 1980s brought more.

There are about 30 daily newspapers and thousands of periodicals, many of the latter house organs of various political and non-political organizations. The government sets general guidelines for the political and cultural content of newspapers and periodicals. There are three television stations and about 30 radio broadcasting companies with more than 180 stations.

==== Tourism ====
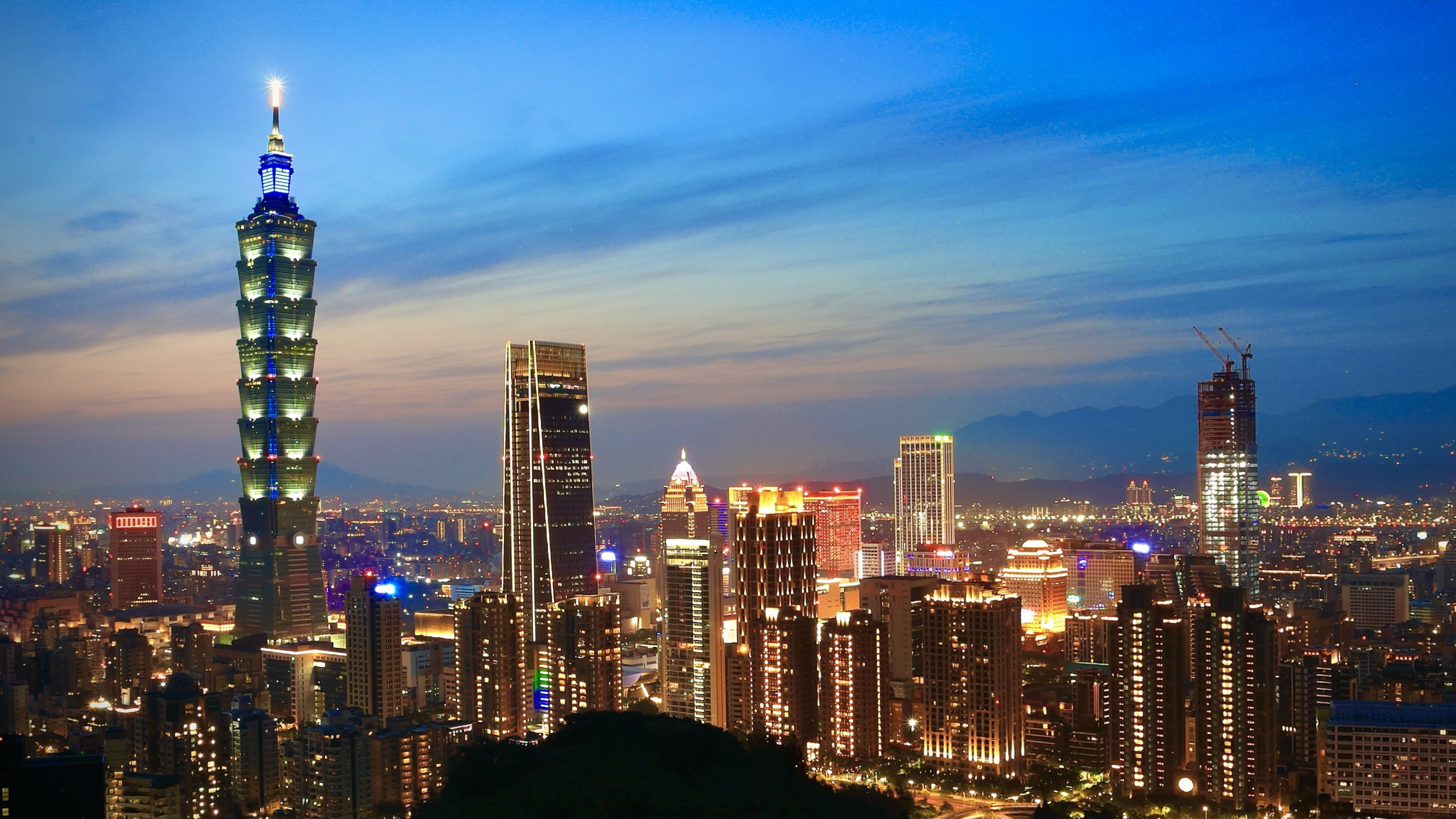
Taipei night skyline with Taipei 101 at left

Tourism in Taiwan is one of the major industries and contributor to the economy of Taiwan. In 2022, Taiwan received under 900,000 international visitors, down from 11.8 million in 2019. Tourism affairs are managed by the Tourism Bureau of the Ministry of Transportation and Communications of Taiwan.

== Foreign trade ==
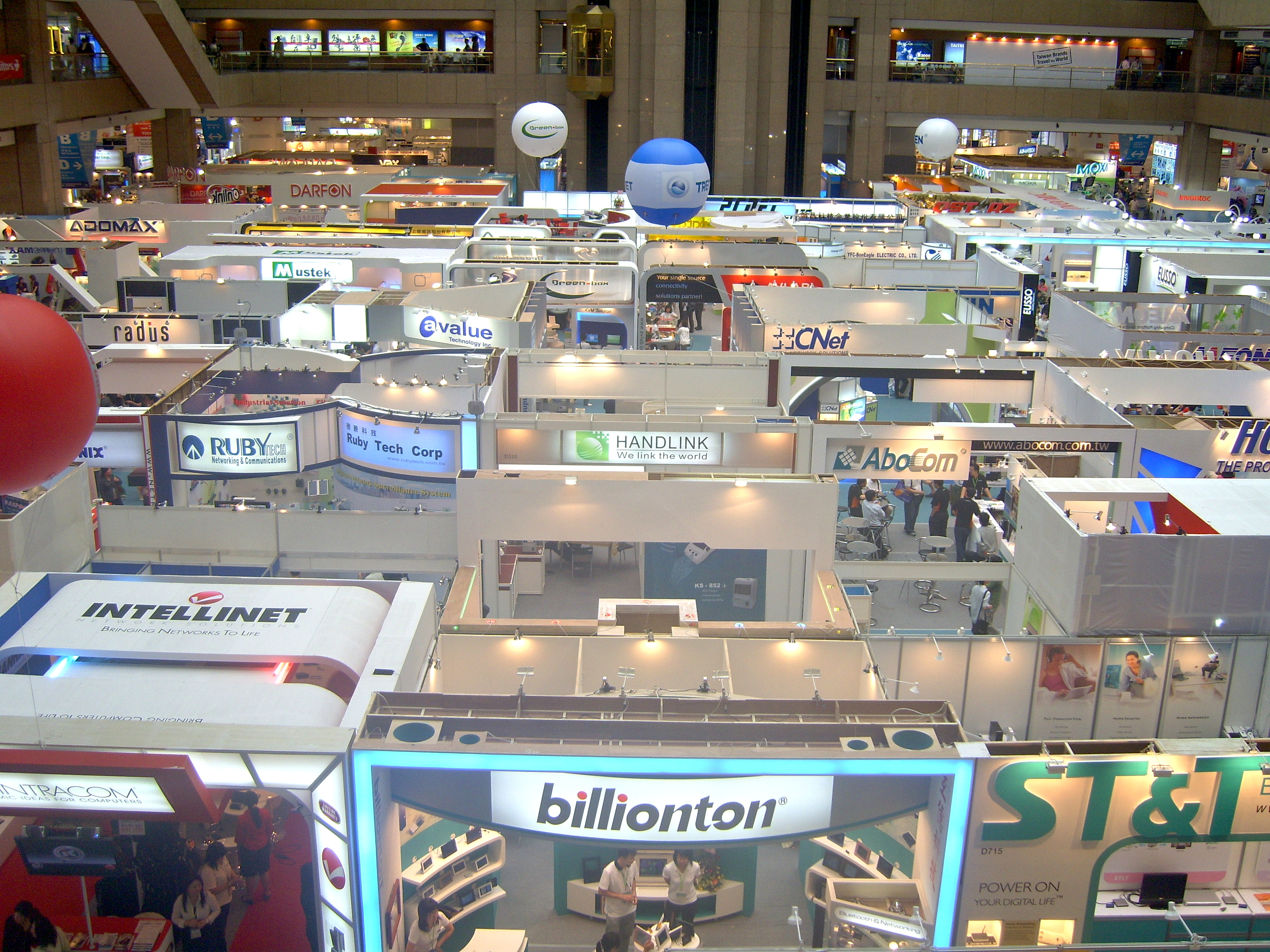
Computex Taipei, the second-largest technology trade show in the world, is a global IT exhibition which attracts many foreign investors.

Foreign trade has been the engine of Taiwan's rapid growth during the past 40 years. Taiwan's economy remains export-oriented; thus, it depends on an open world trade regime and remains vulnerable to downturns in the world economy. The total value of trade increased over fivefold in the 1960s, nearly tenfold in the 1970s, and doubled again in the 1980s. The 1990s saw a more modest, slightly less than twofold, growth. Export composition changed from predominantly agricultural commodities to industrial goods (now 98%). The electronics sector is Taiwan's most important industrial export sector and is the largest recipient of United States investment.

As an island economy with a lack of natural resources and low domestic consumption, Taiwan relies on highly educated human resources and innovation for a competitive advantage in international trade.

Taiwan joined the World Trade Organization (WTO) in January 2002. Taiwan is also a member of the International Chamber of Commerce, Asian Development Bank (ADB), International Energy Agency (IEA), and the Asia-Pacific Economic Cooperation (APEC). Taiwan is an observer at the Organisation for Economic Co-operation and Development (OECD). Taiwan has also signed free trade pacts with Singapore and New Zealand. Taiwan applied for the membership in the Asian Infrastructure Investment Bank in 2015.

Taiwan is the world's largest supplier of contract computer chip manufacturing (foundry services) and is a leading LCD panel manufacturer, DRAM computer memory, networking equipment, and consumer electronics designer and manufacturer. Major hardware companies include Acer, Asus, HTC, Foxconn, TSMC and Pegatron. Textiles are another major industrial export sector, though of declining importance due to labor shortages, increasing overhead costs, land prices, and environmental protection. Imports are dominated by raw materials and capital goods, which account for more than 90% of the total. Taiwan imports most of its energy needs. The lack of formal diplomatic relations between the Republic of China (Taiwan) with Taiwan's trading partners appears not to have seriously hindered Taiwan's rapidly expanding commerce. The Republic of China (Taiwan) maintains cultural and trade offices in more than 60 countries with which it does not have official relations to represent Taiwanese interests. In addition to its WTO membership, Taiwan is a member of the ADB as "Taipei, China" (a name resulting from PRC influence on the bank) and the APEC forum as "Chinese Taipei" (for the same reason as above). These developments reflect Taiwan's economic importance and its desire to become further integrated into the global economy.

The Economic Cooperation Framework Agreement (ECFA) with the People's Republic of China (mainland China) was signed on 29 June 2010, in Chongqing. Its goal is to widen the market for Taiwan's exports. However, the true benefits and impacts brought by ECFA to Taiwan's overall economy are still in dispute. The agreement will allow for more than 500 products made in Taiwan to enter mainland China at low or no tariffs. The Cross-Strait Service Trade Agreement (CSSTA) was a proposed free trade agreement between mainland China and Taiwan that served as a follow-up treaty to the ECFA. Signed in June 2013, the treaty was designed to liberalize trade in service industries such as banking, healthcare and telecommunications. However, as of 2023, it remains unratified and not been implemented due to intense domestic opposition in Taiwan. As of 2021, Taiwan's exports to the PRC (including Hong Kong and Macau) totaled about US$270 billion per year, which is equivalent to more than 40% of Taiwan's total GDP.

The government is also looking to establish trade agreements with Singapore, New Zealand and the United States through the Trade and Investment Framework Agreement.

== Labor policy ==
=== Union policies ===
The Labor Union Laws, legislated by the Kuomintang (KMT) on the mainland, gave Taiwan workers the right to unionize. However, prior to the democratization of Taiwan, the functions of trade unions were limited under strict regulation and state corporatism. Under the Labor Union Laws, workers were only allowed to be organized at the companies, which means industry level unions were forbidden. Also, only one union could exist within each company or geographical area. Special occupational groups such as teachers were not allowed to unionize. The right to strike and collective bargaining were also hamstrung by law. The Collective Bargaining Agreement in 1930 stipulated that collective bargains were not legally valid without government approval. The democratization in 1986 brought dramatic changes to union participation and policies. Between 1986 and 1992, unionized workers increased by 13%. A number of autonomous, non-official trade unions emerged, including the Taiwan Confederation of Trade Unions (TCTU) which acquired legal recognition in 2000. The amendments to the Labor Union Laws and Collective Bargaining Agreement both became effective in the early 21st century. The amended Labor Union Law lifted the limitations on special occupational groups from collective representation. The Collective Bargaining Agreement Act in 2008 guaranteed trade unions the power to negotiate with employers.

=== Employment protection ===
Taiwan's labor rights and employment protections increased with its democratization progress in the 1980s, and it still has a relatively high level of employment protection compared to other East Asia countries. Implemented in August 1984, Labor Standards Law was the first comprehensive employment protection law for Taiwan workers. Prior to its implementation, the Factory Act was the primary law governing labor affairs, but was ineffective in practice because of its narrow coverage of businesses and issues and absence of penalties for violation. In contrast, Labor Standards Law covered a broader range of businesses and labor affairs and detailed penalties for its violation. It regulated a period of notice before firing employees and also required a higher level of severance payment. Other labor issues were also regulated by the law, including contract, wage, overtime payment, compensations for occupational accidents, etc. Penalties for employer violation were also clear in the law, stating fines and criminal liabilities. Council of Labor Affairs (CLA) was set up on 1 August 1987 to help with labor inspection and the enforcement of the Labor Standards Law.

In Taiwan, companies with at least a single employee have the compulsion to contribute to the insurer's employment service insurance premium. The share of labor insurance is divided into a 7:2:1 ratio between employer, employee, and state. As far as a contribution towards social security, companies should pay at least 6% of the wages of its employees towards the social security.

=== Active labor market policies ===
Active labour market policies were carried out in Taiwan in the late 20th and early 21st centuries as a result of economic structural changes caused by globalization and deindustrialization. Unemployment increased and reached approximately 5% in 2002 and 2009. A set of policies was adopted to help the unemployed and provide jobs. The Employment Insurance Act of 2002 grants income security during unemployment but, at the same time, requires beneficiaries to use all available resources to find jobs. The Multi-Faceted Job Creation Program, first introduced in 1999, creates job in the third sector groups, especially in nonprofit organizations. It subsidizes those companies to provide vocational trainings and job opportunities. The Public Sector Temporary Employment Creation Program directly addressed the 2008 financial crisis. Unlike the Multi-Faceted Job Creation Programs, the Public Sector Temporary Employment Creation Program creates jobs in the government itself. From 2008 to 2009, the government was estimated to create 102,000 job opportunities through that program. A job creation project was also implemented to help young people by subsidizing the hiring of young people in universities and private companies.

=== Working hours ===
On 30 July 1984, Taiwan implemented an eighty-six article Labor Standards Act under Presidential Order No.14069. The act defined the standard work week as 40 labor hours with an eight-hour limit per day, permitting an overtime-included maximum of forty-eight labor hours per week.

Article 25 of the Labor Standards Act upholds there will be no sexual discrimination in the conditions of workers, however, because the Taiwanese culture and thus political economy traditionally "categorizes female employees as naturally marriage- and family-oriented," women are assumed to obtain employment in fields that are limited to these ideals. As a result of feminist ideals becoming more prevalent with women seeking equal work conditions in modern societies such as Taiwan, even marital status policy and immigration policy have been affected as women seek less patriarchal roles to the point where Taiwanese men have sought higher rates of transnational marriages since the 1990s.

== Science and industrial technology parks ==
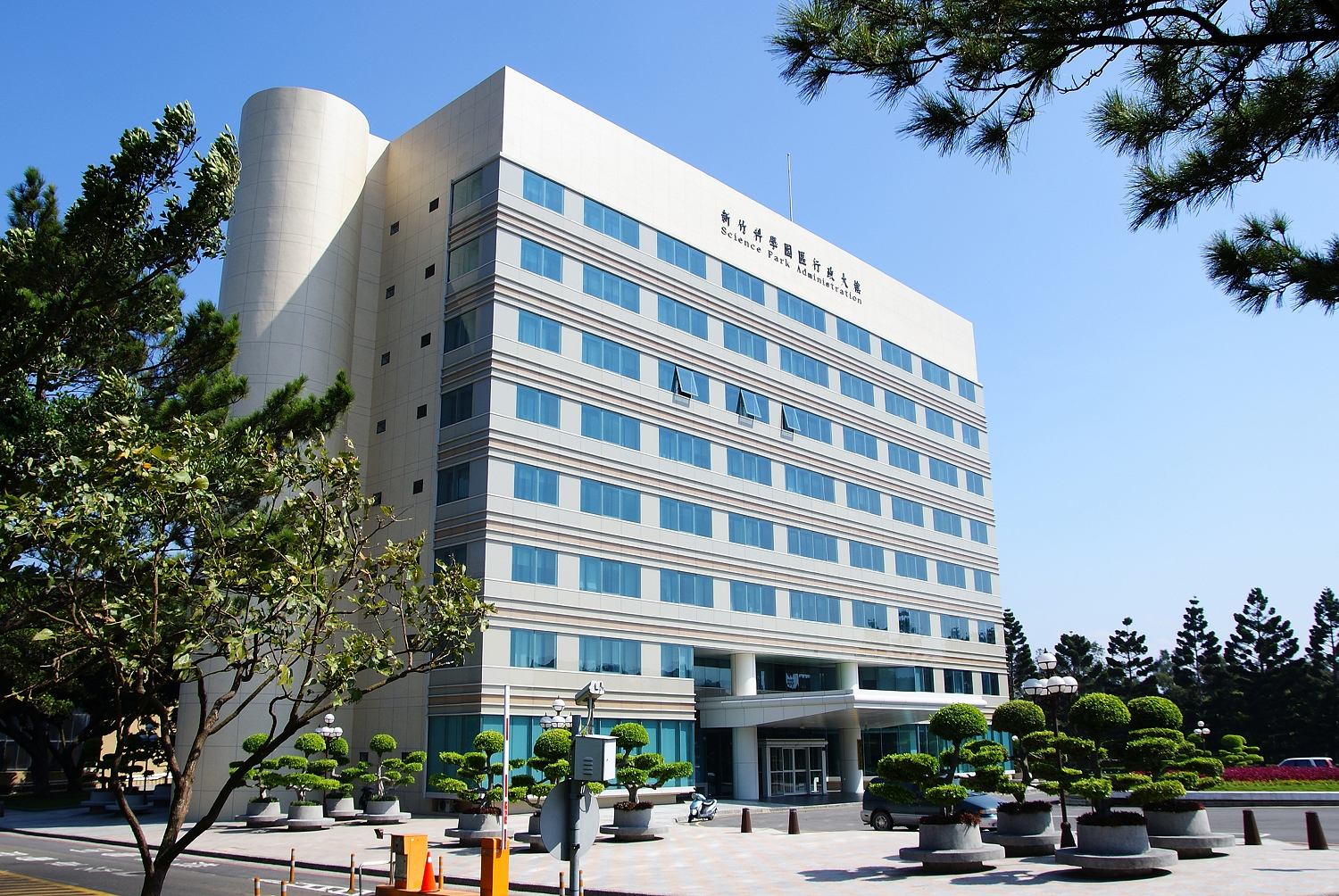
Hsinchu Science Park is home to many of Taiwan's IT companies

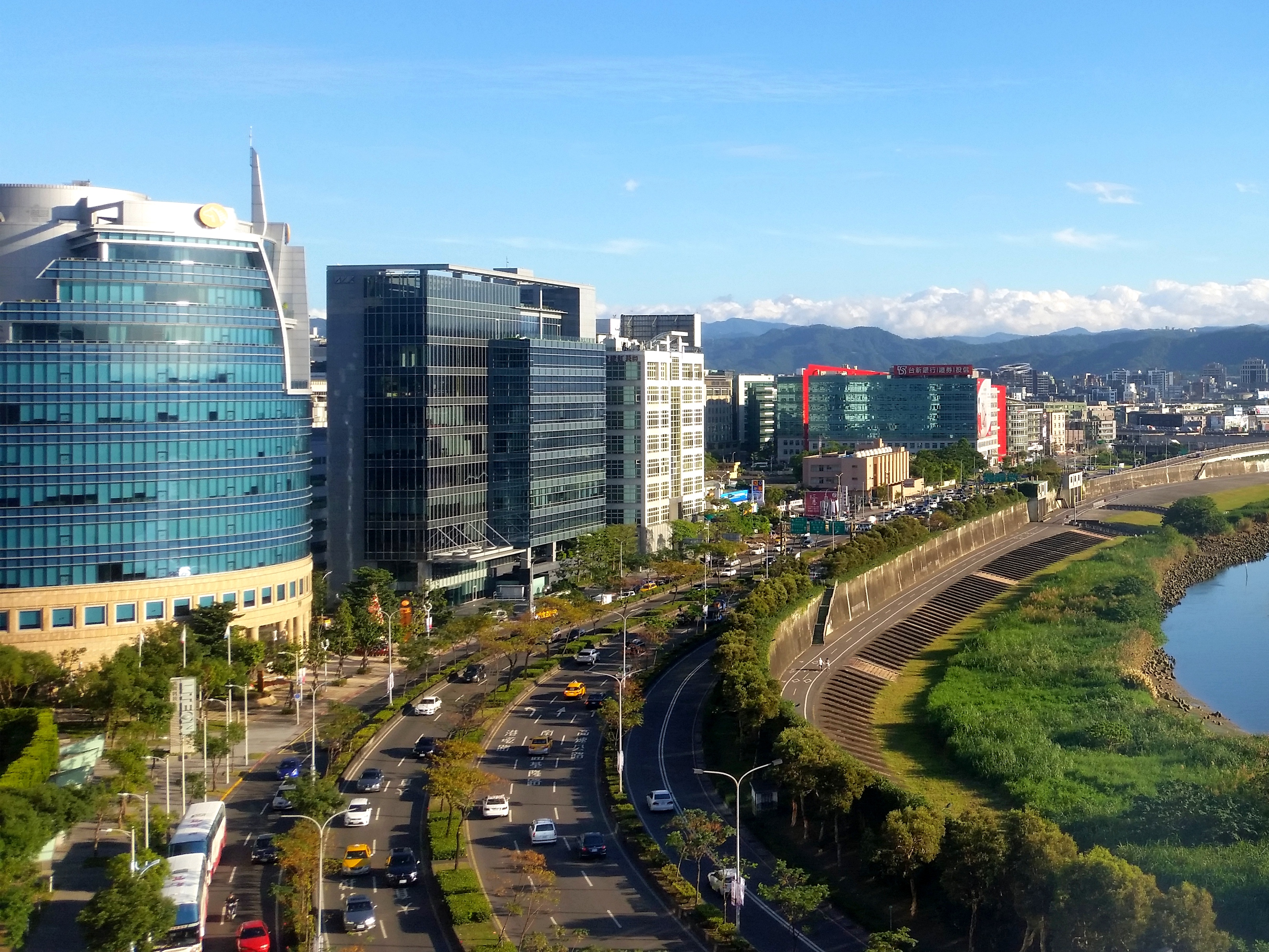
Taipei Neihu Technology Park

In order to promote industrial research and development, the government began establishing science parks, economic zones which provide rent and utility breaks, tax incentives, and specialized lending rates to attract investment. The first of these, the Hsinchu Science Park was established in 1980 by the National Science Council with a focus on research and development in information technology and biotechnology. It has been called Taiwan's "Silicon Valley" and has expanded to six campuses covering an area of 1,140 hectares (11.4 km^{2}). Over 430 companies (including many listed on TAIEX) employing over 130,000 people are located within the park, and paid in capital totaled US$36.10 billion in 2008. Both Taiwan Semiconductor Manufacturing Company and United Microelectronics Corporation, the world's largest and second largest contract chipmakers, are headquartered within the park. Since 1980, the government has invested over US$1 billion in the park's infrastructure, and further expansion for more specialized parks have been pursued. The Industrial Technology Research Institute (ITRI), headquartered within the park, is the largest nonprofit research organization in Taiwan and has worked to develop applied technological research for industry, including for many of Taiwan's traditional industries (such as textiles).

Following the success of the first park, the Southern Taiwan Science Park (STSP), consisting of the Tainan Science Park and the Kaohsiung Science Park, was established in 1996. In addition to companies, several research institutes (including Academia Sinica) and universities have set up branches within the park with a focus on integrated circuits (ICs), optoelectronics, and biotechnology. The Central Taiwan Science Park (CTSP) was established more recently in 2003. While the CTSP is still under development, many firms (including AU Optronics) have already moved into the park and begun manufacturing operations. Like the other parks, CTSP also focuses on ICs, optoelectronics, and biotechnology, with the optoelectronics industry accounting for 78% of its revenue in 2008. These three science parks alone have attracted over NT$4 trillion (US$137 billion) worth of capital inflow, and in 2010 total revenue within the parks reached NT$2.16 trillion (US$72.8 billion).

The Linhai Industrial Park, established in Kaohsiung in 1960, is a well-developed industrial zone with over 490 companies focusing on other industries including base metals, machinery and repairs, nonmetallic mineral products, chemical products, and food and beverage manufacturing. The Changhua Coastal Industrial Park, located in Changhua County, is a newer industrial cluster with many different industries such as food production, glass, textiles, and plastics.

Industrial and science parks in Taiwan include:

- Beitou-Shilin Technology Park
- Central Taiwan Science Park
- Changhua Coastal Industrial Park
- Hsinchu Science Park
  - Hsinchu Biomedical Science Park
- Nankang Software Park
- Neihu Technology Park
- Taichung Shuinan Economic and Trade Park
- Tainan Science Park
- Tai Yuen Hi-Tech Industrial Park
- Southern Taiwan Science Park
  - Kaohsiung Science Park
- National Biotechnology Research Park
- Shalun Smart Green Energy Science City
- Kaohsiung Software Park

== Data ==
The following table shows the main economic indicators in 1980–2025 (with IMF staff estimates in 2026–2031). Inflation under 5% is in green.

| Year | GDP (in bn. US$PPP) | GDP per capita (in US$ PPP) | GDP (in bn. US$nominal) | GDP per capita (in US$ nominal) | GDP growth (real) | Inflation rate (in Percent) | Unemployment (in Percent) | Government debt (in % of GDP) |
|---|---|---|---|---|---|---|---|---|
| 1980 | 57.4 | 3,214.2 | 42.3 | 2,366.8 | ▲8.0% | ▲19.0% | 1.2% | n/a |
| 1981 | ▲68.8 | ▲3,782.1 | ▲49.0 | ▲2,691.5 | ▲9.5% | ▲10.9% | ▲1.4% | n/a |
| 1982 | ▲76.6 | ▲4,135.9 | ▲49.5 | ▼2,675.3 | ▲4.8% | ▲3.0% | ▲2.1% | n/a |
| 1983 | ▲86.8 | ▲4,617.2 | ▲54.1 | ▲2,881.7 | ▲9.0% | ▲1.4% | ▲2.7% | n/a |
| 1984 | ▲98.9 | ▲5,187.7 | ▲61.1 | ▲3,202.6 | ▲10.0% | ▲0.0% | ▼2.5% | n/a |
| 1985 | ▲107.0 | ▲5,538.0 | ▲63.6 | ▲3,293.9 | ▲4.8% | ▼-0.2% | ▲2.9% | n/a |
| 1986 | ▲121.7 | ▲6,236.8 | ▲78.2 | ▲4,008.1 | ▲11.5% | ▲0.7% | ▼2.7% | n/a |
| 1987 | ▲140.6 | ▲7,127.5 | ▲105.0 | ▲5,325.2 | ▲12.8% | ▲0.5% | ▼2.0% | n/a |
| 1988 | ▲157.2 | ▲7,879.3 | ▲126.5 | ▲6,338.1 | ▲8.0% | ▲1.3% | ▼1.7% | n/a |
| 1989 | ▲177.6 | ▲8,813.2 | ▲152.7 | ▲7,575.9 | ▲8.7% | ▲4.4% | ▼1.6% | n/a |
| 1990 | ▲194.5 | ▲9,533.9 | ▲166.6 | ▲8,167.2 | ▲5.5% | ▲4.1% | ▲1.7% | n/a |
| 1991 | ▲217.9 | ▲10,575.6 | ▲187.1 | ▲9,081.9 | ▲8.4% | ▲3.6% | ▼1.5% | n/a |
| 1992 | ▲241.4 | ▲11,604.7 | ▲222.9 | ▲10,715.5 | ▲8.3% | ▲4.5% | 1.5% | n/a |
| 1993 | ▲264.0 | ▲12,572.8 | ▲236.3 | ▲11,256.7 | ▲6.8% | ▲2.9% | 1.5% | n/a |
| 1994 | ▲289.8 | ▲13,685.9 | ▲256.2 | ▲12,099.7 | ▲7.5% | ▲4.1% | ▲1.6% | n/a |
| 1995 | ▲315.1 | ▲14,755.8 | ▲279.1 | ▲13,066.1 | ▲6.5% | ▲3.7% | ▲1.8% | n/a |
| 1996 | ▲340.7 | ▲15,829.6 | ▲292.5 | ▲13,588.3 | ▲6.2% | ▲3.1% | ▲2.6% | n/a |
| 1997 | ▲367.6 | ▲16,906.2 | ▲303.3 | ▲13,948.7 | ▲6.1% | ▲0.9% | ▲2.7% | 25.0% |
| 1998 | ▲387.4 | ▲17,664.2 | ▼280.0 | ▼12,767.1 | ▲4.2% | ▲1.7% | 2.7% | ▼23.7% |
| 1999 | ▲419.3 | ▲18,978.4 | ▲303.8 | ▲13,752.7 | ▲6.7% | ▲0.2% | ▲2.9% | 23.7% |
| 2000 | ▲455.8 | ▲20,463.1 | ▲330.7 | ▲14,844.2 | ▲6.3% | ▲1.2% | ▲3.0% | ▲26.2% |
| 2001 | ▲459.6 | ▲20,511.8 | ▼299.3 | ▼13,357.2 | ▼-1.4% | ▲0.0% | ▲4.6% | ▲30.1% |
| 2002 | ▲492.3 | ▲21,860.4 | ▲307.4 | ▲13,651.4 | ▲5.5% | ▼-0.2% | ▲5.2% | ▼29.8% |
| 2003 | ▲523.2 | ▲23,147.6 | ▲317.4 | ▲14,040.6 | ▲4.2% | ▼-0.3% | ▼5.0% | ▲32.1% |
| 2004 | ▲574.7 | ▲25,327.8 | ▲346.9 | ▲15,290.3 | ▲7.0% | ▲1.6% | ▼4.4% | ▲33.4% |
| 2005 | ▲624.6 | ▲27,430.0 | ▲374.1 | ▲16,427.5 | ▲5.4% | ▲2.3% | ▼4.1% | ▲34.1% |
| 2006 | ▲681.0 | ▲29,768.7 | ▲386.5 | ▲16,892.9 | ▲5.8% | ▲0.6% | ▼3.9% | ▼33.3% |
| 2007 | ▲747.4 | ▲32,553.2 | ▲406.9 | ▲17,723.7 | ▲6.9% | ▲1.8% | 3.9% | ▼32.2% |
| 2008 | ▲767.9 | ▲33,331.2 | ▲415.9 | ▲18,053.6 | ▲0.8% | ▲3.5% | ▲4.1% | ▲33.4% |
| 2009 | ▼760.1 | ▼32,877.5 | ▼390.8 | ▼16,904.5 | ▼-1.6% | ▼-0.9% | ▲5.9% | ▲36.7% |
| 2010 | ▲848.2 | ▲36,619.3 | ▲444.3 | ▲19,181.4 | ▲10.2% | ▲1.0% | ▼5.2% | ▲36.9% |
| 2011 | ▲897.5 | ▲38,642.9 | ▲484.0 | ▲20,838.6 | ▲3.7% | ▲1.4% | ▼4.4% | ▲38.3% |
| 2012 | ▲934.5 | ▲40,079.7 | ▲495.6 | ▲21,256.4 | ▲2.2% | ▲1.9% | ▼4.2% | ▲39.2% |
| 2013 | ▲974.0 | ▲41,670.9 | ▲512.9 | ▲21,945.5 | ▲2.5% | ▲0.8% | 4.2% | ▼38.9% |
| 2014 | ▲1,037.7 | ▲44,283.2 | ▲535.3 | ▲22,844.3 | ▲4.7% | ▲1.2% | ▼4.0% | ▼37.5% |
| 2015 | ▲1,062.7 | ▲45,236.4 | ▼534.5 | ▼22,753.0 | ▲1.5% | ▼-0.3% | ▼3.8% | ▼35.9% |
| 2016 | ▲1,096.0 | ▲46,560.3 | ▲543.1 | ▲23,070.7 | ▲2.2% | ▲1.4% | ▲3.9% | ▼35.4% |
| 2017 | ▲1,156.5 | ▲49,064.2 | ▲591.7 | ▲25,102.1 | ▲3.7% | ▲0.6% | ▼3.8% | ▼34.5% |
| 2018 | ▲1,183.0 | ▲50,151.5 | ▲610.7 | ▲25,888.8 | ▲2.9% | ▲1.4% | ▼3.7% | ▼33.8% |
| 2019 | ▲1,242.2 | ▲52,630.6 | ▲613.5 | ▲25,992.8 | ▲3.1% | ▲0.6% | 3.7% | ▼32.6% |
| 2020 | ▲1,366.5 | ▲57,996.0 | ▲676.9 | ▲28,727.7 | ▲3.4% | ▼-0.2% | ▲3.9% | ▼32.0% |
| 2021 | ▲1,512.4 | ▲64,702.0 | ▲777.0 | ▲33,238.7 | ▲6.7% | ▲2.0% | ▲4.0% | ▼30.1% |
| 2022 | ▲1,663.5 | ▲71,502.2 | ▼765.6 | ▼32,909.3 | ▲2.7% | ▲2.9% | ▼3.7% | ▼29.5% |
| 2023 | ▲1,743.7 | ▲74,453.7 | ▼757.4 | ▼32,338.7 | ▲1.1% | ▲2.5% | ▼3.5% | ▼29.0% |
| 2024 | ▲1,881.2 | ▲80,390.3 | ▲801.5 | ▲34,251.6 | ▲5.3% | ▲2.2% | ▼3.4% | ▼26.8% |
| 2025 | ▲2,102.4 | ▲90,233.3 | ▲920.1 | ▲39,488.6 | ▲8.7% | ▲1.7% | 3.4% | ▼22.4% |
| 2026 | ▲2,274.6 | ▲98,050.7 | ▲976.7 | ▲42,102.7 | ▲5.2% | ▲1.5% | 3.4% | ▲27.6% |
| 2027 | ▲2,393.6 | ▲103,626.9 | ▲1,036.9 | ▲44,892.2 | ▲3.0% | ▲1.6% | 3.4% | 27.6% |
| 2028 | ▲2,492.5 | ▲108,376.5 | ▲1,094.2 | ▲47,576.1 | ▲2.4% | ▲1.6% | 3.4% | 27.6% |
| 2029 | ▲2,596.9 | ▲113,407.9 | ▲1,153.4 | ▲50,369.8 | ▲2.4% | ▲1.6% | 3.4% | 27.6% |
| 2030 | ▲2,708.7 | ▲118,801.9 | ▲1,214.1 | ▲53,250.3 | ▲2.4% | ▲1.6% | 3.4% | 27.6% |
| 2031 | ▲2,816.2 | ▲124,052.4 | ▲1,273.6 | ▲56,100.7 | ▲2.1% | ▲1.5% | 3.4% | 27.6% |

The real median income growth was 1.35% in 2025.

== Largest companies ==
According to the 2025 Fortune Global 500 Rankings, Taiwan's largest publicly traded companies are:

Fortune 500 2025
| Rank | Company | Revenues ($ billion) | Profit ($ billion) | Assets ($ billion) |
|---|---|---|---|---|
| 1 | Hon Hai Precision | 213.6 | 4.75 | 133.9 |
| 2 | TSMC | 90.1 | 36.08 | 204 |
| 3 | Quanta Computer | 43.9 | 1.85 | 28.4 |
| 4 | Pegatron | 35 | 0.52 | 20.5 |
| 5 | CPC | 32.7 | -1.02 | 33.9 |
| 6 | Wistron | 32.6 | 0.54 | 17.9 |

== Economic research institutes ==
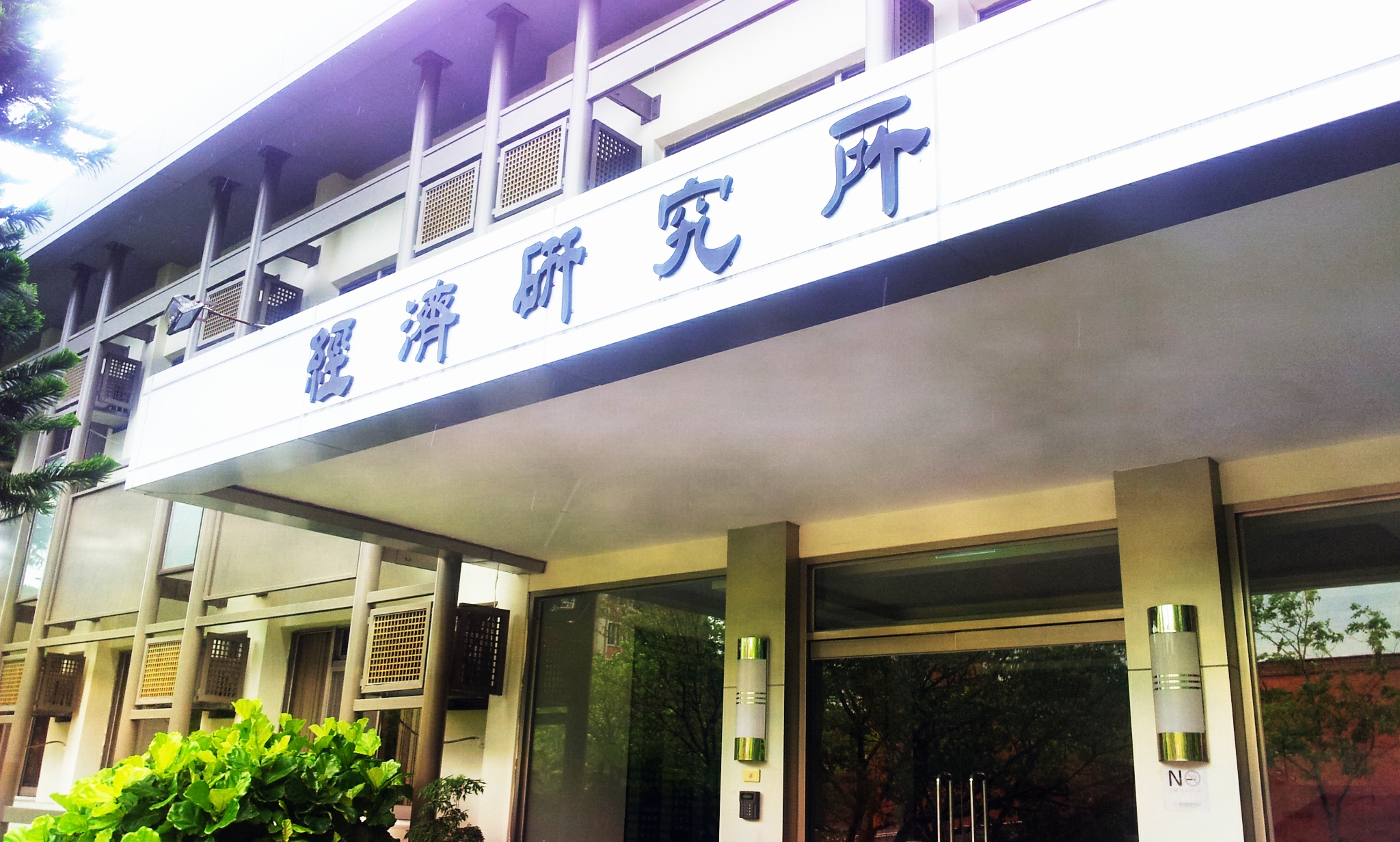
Institute of Economics, Academia Sinica

- Taiwan Institute of Economic Research
- Chung-Hua Institution for Economic Research
- Institute of Economics, Academia Sinica
- Industrial Technology Research Institute
- Taiwan Livestock Research Institute

== Exchange rates ==
Current TWD exchange rates
| From Google Finance: | AUD CAD CHF CNY EUR GBP HKD JPY USD CAD KRW JPY |
| From Yahoo! Finance: | AUD CAD CHF CNY EUR GBP HKD JPY USD CAD KRW JPY |
| From XE.com: | AUD CAD CHF CNY EUR GBP HKD JPY USD CAD KRW JPY |
| From OANDA: | AUD CAD CHF CNY EUR GBP HKD JPY USD CAD KRW JPY |

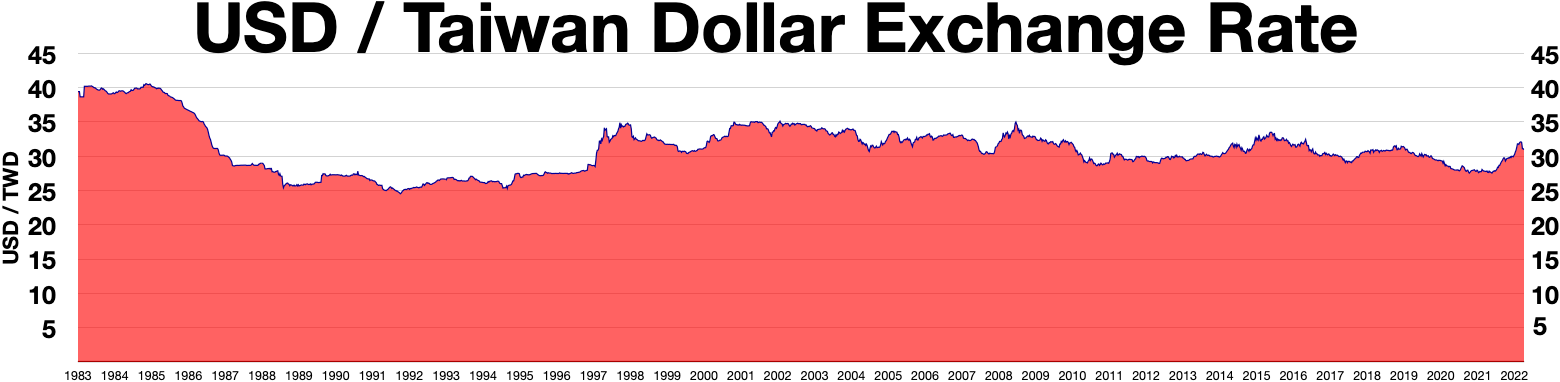
USD / Taiwan Dollar exchange rate

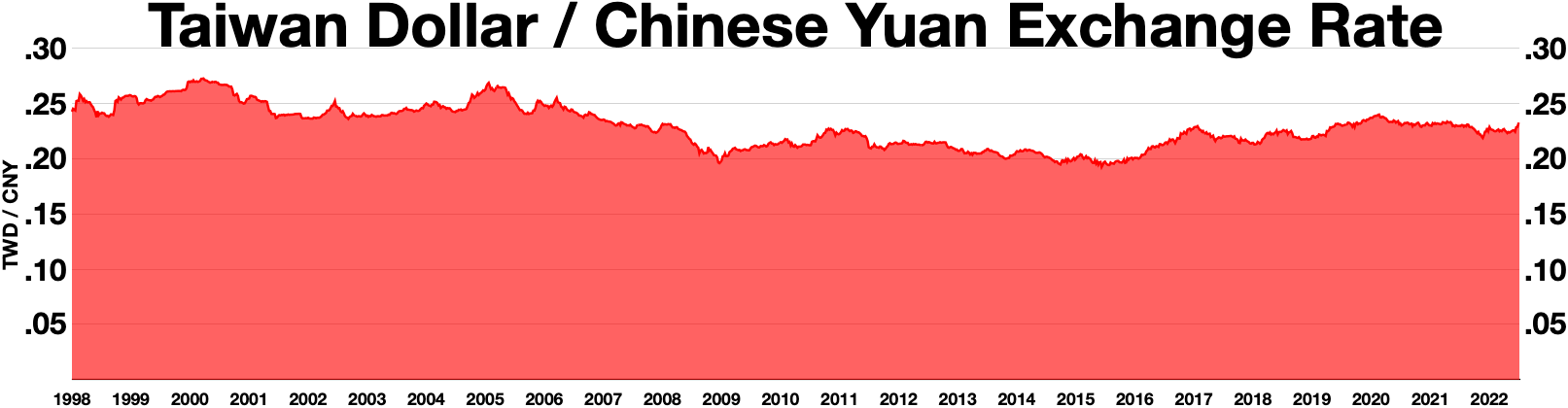
Taiwan Dollar / Chinese Yuan exchange rate

== See also ==
- List of companies of Taiwan
- List of largest companies in Taiwan
- List of metropolitan areas in Taiwan
- List of state-owned enterprises of Taiwan
- List of Taiwanese people by net worth
- Corruption in Taiwan
- Central Bank of the Republic of China (Taiwan)
- Consumer Protection Committee
- Council for Economic Planning and Development
- Export–Import Bank of the Republic of China
- Financial Supervisory Commission (Taiwan)
- Four Asian Tigers
- Gambling in Taiwan
- Industrial Development Administration
- Made in Taiwan
- Ministry of Economic Affairs (Taiwan)
- Ministry of Finance (Taiwan)
- Ministry of Labor (Taiwan)
- Taiwan Miracle
- Taiwan Trade Shows
- Taiwanese Wave
- Taxation in Taiwan
- Asia Silicon Valley Development Plan
- Bamboo network
- China Circle
- New Ten Major Construction Projects
- Non-China supply chain
- One Town One Product (Taiwan)
- Party-state capitalism
- Silicon shield
- Economy of East Asia
