= Tainan (disambiguation) =

Tainan may refer to:

== Places in Taiwan ==
- Tainan City, a city in southern Taiwan
- Tainan County, a county in southern Taiwan
- Tainan Airport, a commercial airport in Tainan City, Taiwan
- Tainan Station (disambiguation)
- Tainan Municipal Baseball Stadium, a baseball stadium in Tainan City, Taiwan
- Tainan University of Technology, a private university in the Tainan metropolitan area, Taiwan
- Tainan Science Park, Tainan City, Taiwan

== Japanese Navy ==
- Tainan Air Group, a fighter aircraft and airbase garrison unit of the Imperial Japanese Navy during the Pacific campaign of World War II

== See also ==
- Tinian
