= Corruption in Taiwan =

Corruption in Taiwan is the use of political power by government officials in Taiwan for private gain. Taiwan, or the Republic of China, is noted for significant anti-corruption strides. Out of 182 countries, Taiwan ranked 24th in Transparency International's 2025 Corruption Perceptions Index, where the country ranked first is perceived to have the most honest public sector. Key issues needing improvements include graft, bribery, and unethical practices.

== Organized crime and black gold ==
A prevalent type of corruption in Taiwan involves organized crime and "black-gold politics". This term is associated with the increased involvement of racketeers and self-serving businessmen in politics to protect their interests. Particularly, these political elements resort to bribery in order to wield and maintain their political influence. Corrupted officials include the police and judicial system including high-level government officials.

In 2024, prosecutors investigated alleged corruption and misconduct by the Hsinchu City police. The probe was initially around the police's alleged taking bribes from operators of electronic gambling parlors, but expanded to irregularly cancelled traffic tickets. At least 21 police officers and other officials were charged with violating Taiwan's Anti-Corruption Act, mainly from the latter accusation.

Criminal elements who were able to penetrate the political system ensure political longevity through bureaucratic corruption such as money laundering and money politics. A legislator named Lo Fu-chu, for instance, is suspected of being part of the Tien Tau Meng syndicate. In 2001, he physically assaulted Diane Lee, a fellow legislator. Aside from this, Lo also faced several other corruption charges. Prosecutors charged him with business fraud and embezzlement, with allegations that he pocketed about $38 million from several businesses through intimidation. He was also prosecuted for providing forged documents in order to obtain loans from two banks amounting to $23.4 million.

By 2021, the Legislative Corruption Scandal was uncovered. The case, which is considered the biggest in Taiwan's judiciary history, involved widespread bribe-taking, abuse of authority, conflict of interest, and other illegal activities committed by at least 200 members of the judiciary and the bureaucracy.

The heidao problem has become entrenched since it cultivated a symbiotic relationship between criminal elements and politicians. To address the issue and its related corrupt and unethical practices, the government instituted several initiatives focusing on raising public awareness of accountability, financial propriety, and personal ethics. However, due to weak anti-corruption apparatus as well as the noted lack of ethical conduct among civil servants, corruption associated with heidao persists.

== Permissive legal framework ==
The Diplomat described the country's legal framework as weak, allowing for an environment permissive of graft. This is demonstrated in the case of the country's Lobbying Act, which, according to the Control Yuan, was passed without strict enforcement of registration requirements. For example, the awarding of the contract to build Taipei Dome to Farglory Group was mired in allegations of political corruption. In particular, Chao Teng-hsiung, the company's CEO, was accused of bribing city officials to secure bids for Taipei Dome. In a separate example, a Taipei city councilor, Chen Chung-Wen, was indicted in 2024 for self-dealing and obtaining bribes from a contractor named Taifo.

In 2010, authorities charged twelve judges, prosecutors, and lawyers with taking bribes from a legislator on trial for corruption. They included senior High Court judges, who had overturned the legislator's conviction in the lower court.

The flaw in the legal framework is also reflected in several cases of corruption in the green energy sector. For instance, in August 2024, prosecutors detained seven local officials for their alleged involvement in green energy-related corruption. The arrests were part of a government crackdown on green energy-related corruption involving officials taking bribes from green energy providers.

Judicial reform advocates noted that Taiwan has existing institutions that address corruption but these systems depend on the willingness of their officials to prosecute cases. Reform advocates also cite the weaknesses of existing legal frameworks such as the country's Anti-Corruption Act and the Criminal Code. These legal instruments regulate corruption among public officials. The lack of clear definitions such as what constitutes bribery allows for different interpretations. In Taiwan's’ statutes, bribery is not expressly defined and determination rests on judges on a case-to-case basis. There is also the broad definition of “public officials” in the Criminal Code, which covers those who are serving state organizations and local autonomous bodies. It is argued that this adversely affects legal enforcement and oversight. For example, officials accepting bribes within and outside of Taiwan are subject to the Anti-Corruption Act but it has no jurisdiction over the bribing of local officials outside of Taiwan.

== Anti-corruption measures ==
The Taiwanese government has launched reform initiatives to curb corruption since it became democratic in 1992. These include the Criminal Code, the Anti-Corruption Act, and other statutes. While weaknesses exist, the passage of new laws and reform of existing ones has defined what constitutes corrupt behavior and addressed it accordingly.

The reform initiatives have been working as demonstrated in the improvement of Taiwan's ranking in Transparency International's Corruption Perceptions Index. The Corruption Perceptions Index scores countries on a scale from 0 ("highly corrupt") to 100 ("very clean") and then ranks them by score; the country ranked first is perceived to have the most honest public sector. In 2020, the country ranked 28th of 180 countries with a score of 65 but it marked an improved rating in 2021, as it placed in the 25th position with a score of 68. This score was maintained in 2022 but declined to 67 in 2023 and 2024 before returning to 68 in 2025. For comparison with regional scores, the best score among those countries of the Asia Pacific region that appeared in the Index (Note: Afghanistan, Australia, Bangladesh, Bhutan, Brunei Darussalam, Cambodia, China, Fiji, Hong Kong, India, Indonesia, Japan, North Korea, South Korea, Laos, Malaysia, Maldives, Mongolia, Myanmar, Nepal, New Zealand, Pakistan, Papua New Guinea, Philippines, Singapore, Solomon Islands, Sri Lanka, Taiwan, Thailand, Timor-Leste, Vanuatu, and Vietnam) was 84, the average score was 45 and the worst score was 15. For comparison with worldwide scores, the best score was 89 (ranked 1), the average score was 42, and the worst score was 9 (ranked 181, in a two-way tie).
