= Kaohsiung Science Park =

Industrial park in Luzhu, Kaohsiung, Taiwan

Kaohsiung Science Park 高雄科學園區
- Interactive map of Kaohsiung Science Park 高雄科學園區
- Location: Lujhu, Kaohsiung, Taiwan
- Coordinates: 22°50′04″N 120°15′25″E
- Opening date: 2010
- Size: 5.70 km^{2} (2.20 sq mi)

The Kaohsiung Science Park (Chinese: 高雄科學園區; pinyin: Gāoxióng Kēxué Yuánqū), also known as Luzhu Science Park, is located in Lujhu District, Kaohsiung, Taiwan. It is a part of the project of Southern Taiwan Science Park, and covers an area of 1,409 acres (5.70 km^{2}). The park was established in 2010.

== See also ==
- Tainan Science Park
- Southern Taiwan Semiconductor Corridor
