= Techman =

Robotic company of Taiwan

- Industry: Automation and robotics
- Founded: 2016
- Headquarters: Taoyuan, Taiwan
- Area served: Global
- Key people: Shi-chi Ho, Haw Chen (CEO)
- Products: Collaborative robots (cobots), automation software and solutions
- Number of employees: 400+（2021）
- Website: www.tm-robot.com/en

Techman Robot Inc., formerly a business division of Quanta Storage Inc., is an independent company under Quanta Computer established in 2015. The company is most recognized for its cobot with a built-in vision system: the TM Robot series. This robot series previously won the COMPUTEX D&I Gold Award. Techman Robot Inc. is also among the first companies to receive the TARS certification.

Techman Robot Inc. is headquartered in Taiwan and has overseas branches in Shanghai, Shenzhen, Chongqing, Busan, and Alblasserdam. The company also partners with distributors in the United States, Europe, China, Japan, South Korea, and Southeast Asia.

== Overview ==
According to Nikkei Asia they are "a leader in the field of collaborative robots."

Founded as a subsidiary of Quanta in 2016 Techman is based in Taoyuan's Hwa Ya Technology Park. Quanta head Barry Lam has a mobile Techman robot in his office which serves refreshments to guests.

== History ==
Techman Robot Inc., a former business division of Quanta Storage Inc. (TWSE 6188), was founded as an independent subsidiary in 2015.

Mr. Shi-chi Ho, General Manager of Quanta Storage Inc. at the time, established a robotics laboratory as a business division for the company in 2012. The laboratory developed the first collaborative robot (cobot) with a built-in vision system – the TM5

In 2014 the TM5 was subsequently unveiled at the International Robot Exhibition (iREX) held in Tokyo, Japan, in 2015.

The first commercial TM5 was shipped at the end of 2016, and the company became the world's second-largest cobot brand by 2018.

Techman Robot signed an MOU with automated product giant Omron in Kyoto on 11 May 2018, committing to the promotion of cobots to various industries worldwide.

At the end of 2019, the TM AI+ software solution was introduced to expand cobot applications from pick-and-place to product inspection. The TM AI+ has now been widely incorporated in the semiconductor and logistics industries.

By 2019 it was the world's second largest manufacturer of cobots after Universal Robots. As of 2021 they were still the second largest manufacturer of cobots with 10% of the market share to Universal Robotic’s 50%.

In 2021 Omron and Techman announced that Omron would be acquiring a 10% stake in Techman. The value of the investment was undisclosed.

== Leadership ==
Haw Chen is the CEO of Techman.

== Collaborations ==
Techman is working with Vincennes University and Telamon Robotics to develop a cobot training curriculum.

== Products ==
- TM Xplore I
- TM Robot Series
- TM Operator Series
- TM Smart Factory Series

== Industrial Applications ==
=== Manufacturing ===
TM Robot is suitable for manufacturing a range of products, including automobiles, electronics, semiconductors, machinery, home appliances, furniture, toys, and apparel. It can also be applied to streamline the production lines of metal and plastic products, parts, and accessories.

=== Catering ===
TM Robots can be applied in restaurants and kitchens to streamline catering processes.

=== Warehousing ===
TM Robots make up for the lack of transporters and movers in the logistics and warehousing industries. They can be equipped on AGVs or AMRs to facilitate logistical operations.

=== Entertainment ===
TM Robots can be used to carry heavy camera equipment and manoeuvred through narrow spaces, providing the freedom and flexibility for videographers to capture unique or fast-paced shots.

=== Education ===
Students and researchers can use TM cobots to learn about robotics and programming. TM cobots support manual programming instruction for students to move the arm manually or remotely while recording or saving relevant coordinates, which is used at a later stage to recreate certain motions.

== Major Milestones ==
=== 2012~2013 ===
- Robot Laboratory is established as a new business unit at Quanta Storage Inc.
- First SCARA Robot and Dual-Arm SCARA are developed.

=== 2014 ===
- Robot Business Division- is formally established.

=== 2015 ===
- The first TM5 collaborative robot was born.
- TM5 is unveiled at the 2015 iRex exhibition in Tokyo.
- Techman Electronics Inc. is established.

=== 2016 ===
- Techman Electronics is formally renamed Techman Robot Inc.
- TM5 is officially released to the market.
- Techman Robot attends the TAIROS exhibition and CIIF in Shanghai

=== 2017 ===
- Techman Robot Inc. attends the Hannover Messe exhibition and expands into the European market.

=== 2018 ===
- Techman Robot Inc. becomes the second-largest cobot brand in the world.
- Techman Robot Inc. attends the IMTS exhibition and expands into the US market.
- TM5 is awarded the 2018 Red Dot Design Award, iF Design Award, and 2018 Taiwan Excellence Award.
- TM12, TM14, and TM Manager are officially announced.
- Techman Robot Inc. signs an MOU with Omron.

=== 2019 ===
- TM Palletizing Operator is officially announced.
- Established Techman Robot (Shanghai) Subsidiary Company.

=== 2020 ===
- TM AI+ is officially announced.
- Overseas branch offices are established in South Korea and the Netherlands.
- TM12 is awarded the 2020 Taiwan Excellence Award.

== Awards ==
Award	Year	Product
Taiwan Excellence	2020	TM12
Red Dot Design Award	2018	TM5
iF Product Design Award	2018	TM5
Golden Pin Design Award	2017	TM5
COMPUTEX D&I Gold Award	2017	TM5

== International Certification and Patents ==
Techman Robot Inc. has secured patents in Taiwan, the United States, and China. Its cobots have received TARS, ISO10218-1, and ISO/TS15066 certification, and its factories comply with ISO9001 and ISO14001 specifications.
