= Sampo Corporation =

Taiwanese manufacturing company

Sampo Corporation 聲寶股份有限公司
- Type: Public
- Traded as: TWSE: 1604
- Industry: Electronics
- Founded: 1936
- Headquarters: Taoyuan City, Taiwan
- Products: Home appliance
- Number of employees: 1930
- Website: www.sampo.com.tw (in Chinese)

Sampo's logo 2002–2012

Sampo Corporation (Chinese: 聲寶股份有限公司) is a major manufacturing company in Taiwan. It manufactures household electrical items, including televisions, air-conditioners, and washing machines. The company has collaborated with TCL. It also manufactures PDP-TVs for Thomson on a contract basis.

In 1967, Sampo and Sony established a joint venture in Taiwan, Sony Taiwan Limited. In 2000, Sony headquarters in Japan withdrew its agency rights and consolidated all Sony affiliates in Taiwan, ended the partnership between Sampo.

In 1969, Sampo and Sharp cooperated to manufacture color televisions. In 1990, Sharp Corporation (Taiwan) was established by Sharp and Sampo as the official branch of Sharp in Taiwan, responsible for the import and sales of Sharp's products. This partnership ended when Foxconn acquired Sharp in 2016.
