= Tainan Science Park =

Industrial park in Xinshi, Tainan, Taiwan

Coordinates: 23.101282°N 120.282106°E

Tainan Science Park 台南科學園區
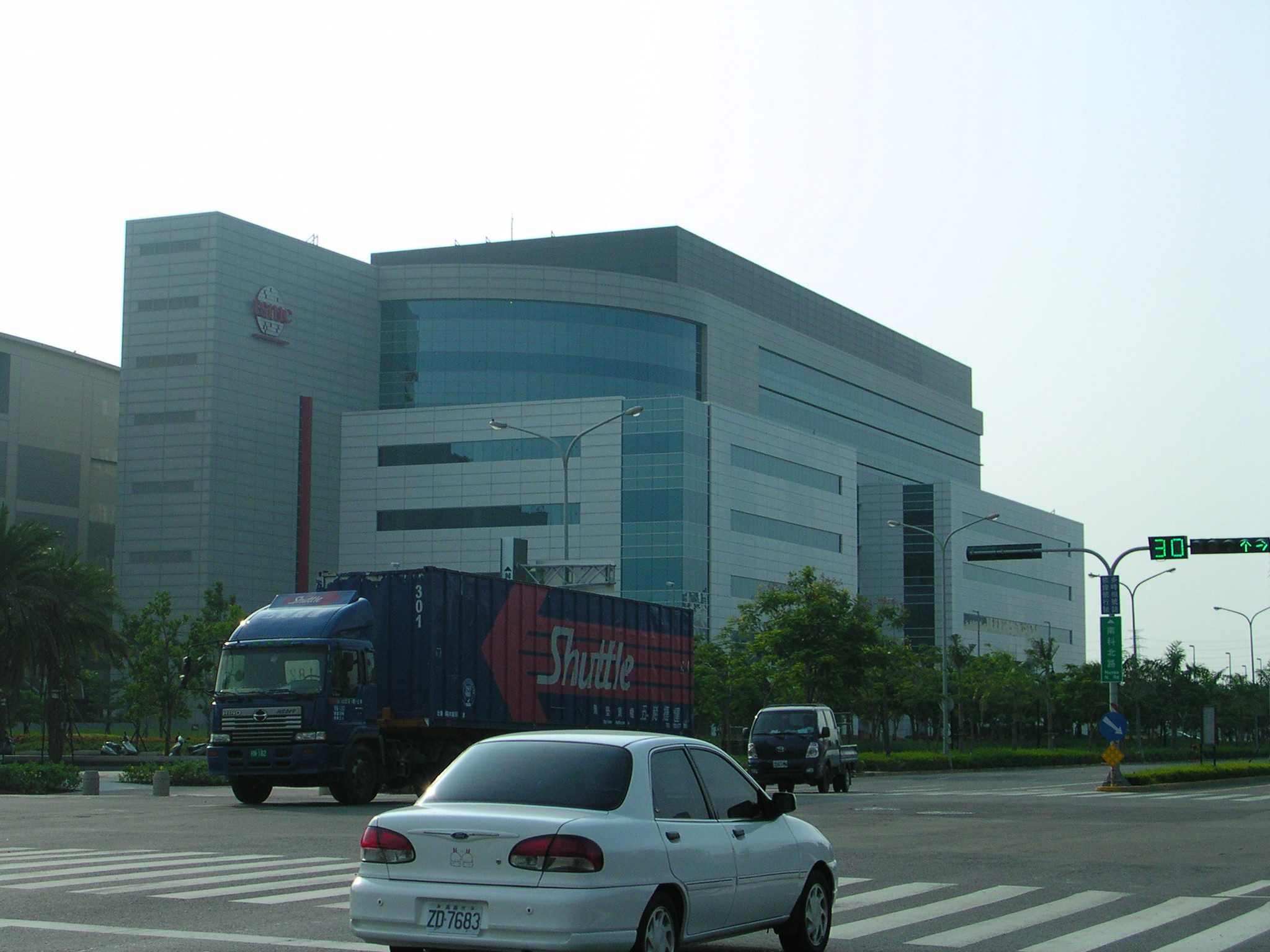
- Interactive map of Tainan Science Park 台南科學園區
- Location: Xinshi, Tainan, Taiwan
- Opening date: 1997
- Size: 10.38 km^{2} (4.01 sq mi)

Tainan Science Park (Chinese: 台南科學園區) of Taiwan is located in Sinshih, Shanhua and Anding Districts of Tainan City with a total area of 2,565 acres (10.38 km^{2}), and is a part of the Southern Taiwan Science Park (STSP).

== History ==
On 1 July 1993, the Executive Yuan approved the establishment of a science park in southern Taiwan as part of the Economic Revitalization Plan. The Phase I site of the park was approved in May 1995 and totaled 1,577 acres (6.38 km^{2}), marking the beginning of high-tech development in southern Taiwan. Phase II was approved in September 2001 and covered an area of 988 acres (4.00 km^{2}) The park focuses on optoelectronics, integrated circuits, biotechnology, and precision machinery industries.

== See also ==
- Kaohsiung Science Park
- Hsinchu Science Park
