= Taiwan Textile Research Institute =

Taiwanese research institute

- Established: 1959
- Focus: Textiles research and industry support
- Staff: 300
- Key people: Huang Po-hsiung (general secretary)
- Location: Taipei, Taiwan

The Taiwan Textile Research Institute is a government funded research institute in Taiwan (ROC) which supports the textile industry in Taiwan.

== History ==
TTRI was founded in 1959. After the normalization of relations with the People’s Republic of China much of Taiwan’s textile industry wither shifted production or went out of business. According to TTRI data in 1997 there were 7,752 textile companies in Taiwan, but by 2010 there were only 4,299.

In the 21st century the institute has supported the shift of Taiwan’s textile industry towards technical textiles, a global market which Taiwan had captured 70% of by 2018. The institute has also supported the development of sustainable textiles. In 2019 TTRI employed 300 professionals, two thirds of whom hold advanced degrees.

== Research ==
In 2019 the institute developed an air jet weaving machine. In partnership with National Taiwan University of Science and Technology (NTUS) and Taiwan Yingmi Technology TTRI has worked to develop gloves which can translate sign language. Taiwan Textile Research Institute (TTRI) is working with Taiwan based Niching to develop a range of abrasion-resistant fabrics for use in socks and workwear.

== Notable researchers and staff ==
- Peter Tsai, inventor of the N95 mask

== See also ==
- Industrial Technology Research Institute
- Automotive Research & Testing Center
- Institute for Information Industry
- Ship and Ocean Industries R&D Center
- Fashion in Taiwan
