= Eclat =

Éclat, Eclat or ECLAT may refer to:

- Éclat, a piece of music for 15 players by Pierre Boulez from 1965
- Eclat Textile, a Taiwanese textile company
- Lotus Eclat, a car
- Association rule learning § Eclat algorithm, an algorithm
