= Automotive industry in Taiwan =

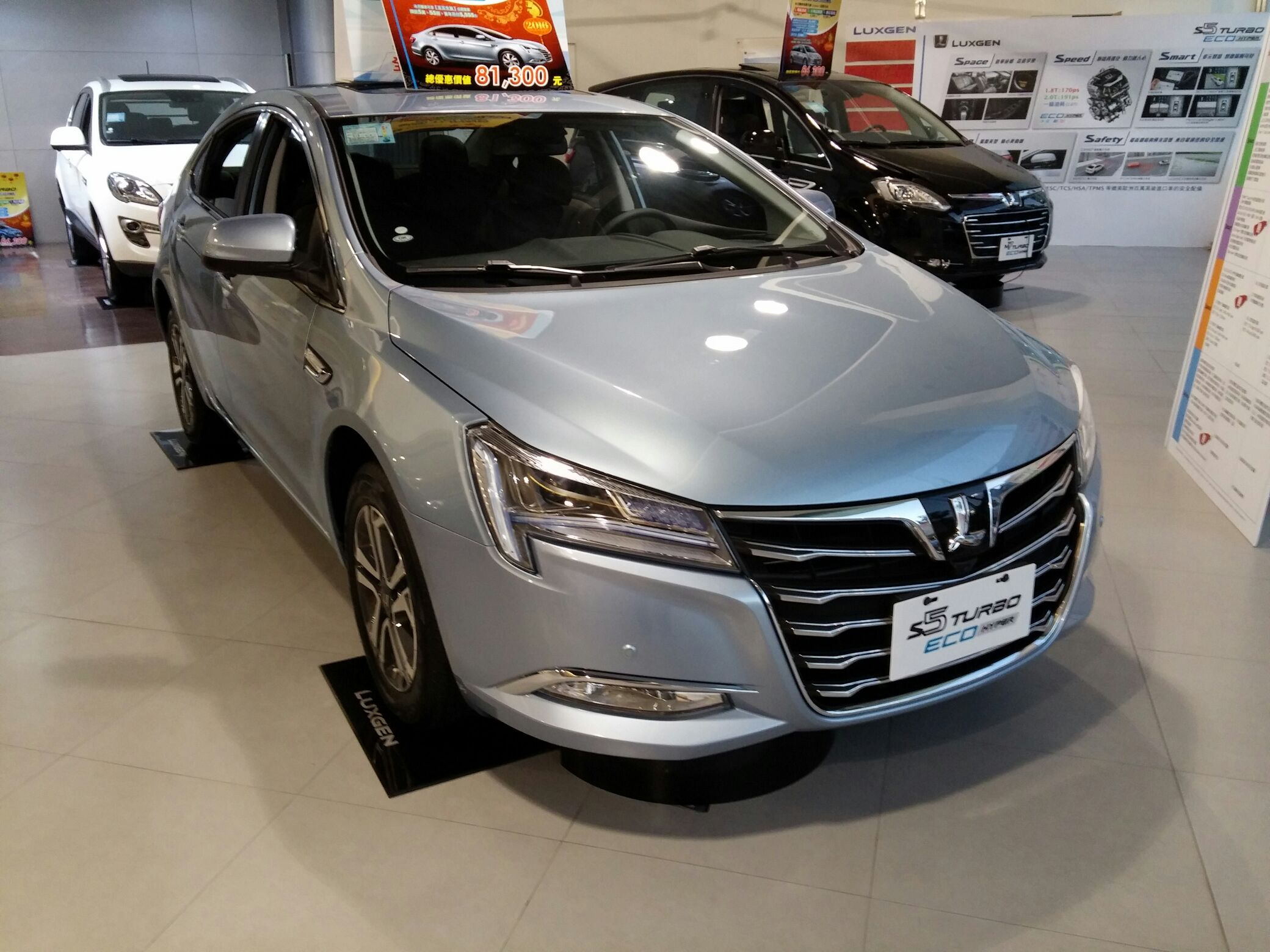
Domestically produced Luxgen car in Taiwan

Automotive industry in Taiwan refers to the automotive industry in Taiwan.

== Manufacturers ==
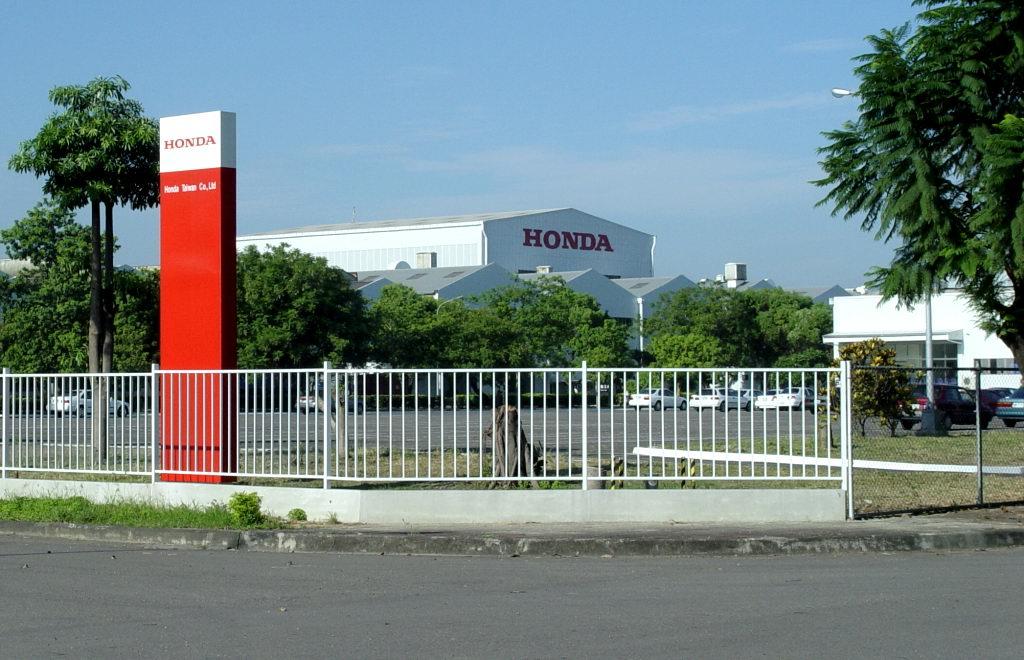
A Honda vehicle manufacturing plant in Pingtung County

In total, there are around 3,000 automotive-related companies in Taiwan. Hotai Motor accounted for 28.8% of the total cars sold in Taiwan, followed by China Motor Corporation (10.9%), Yulon Nissan Motor Corporation (9.6%) and Honda Taiwan (7.7%).

== Exports and imports ==
Around 41.7% of vehicles sold in Taiwan were imported. In 2016, around 75% of automotive parts and components produced in Taiwan were exported, mainly to the United States (43%, valued at NT$67.8 billion), Japan (6%, valued at NT$9.5 billion), China (5%, valued at NT$8.2 billion) and United Kingdom (4%, valued at NT$5.6 billion).

== Economy ==
Annually, there are 400,000 cars sold in Taiwan. In total, the output of the entire automotive industries in Taiwan accounted for almost 3% of Taiwan's gross domestic product. In 2016, the output of automotive industry in Taiwan amounted US$20 billion, which was divided into parts and components manufacturing (US$7 billion), domestic car production (US$6.5 billion) and vehicle electronics (US$6 billion). In 2013, the automotive industry output accounted for 2.7% of Taiwan's total manufacturing output.

Taiwanese firms increasingly invested in automotive electrification, 75% of Tesla, Inc.’s suppliers are Taiwanese. Taiwan is one of the few places in the world with a comprehensive EV supply chain and Taiwan is an integral part of global EV supply chains.

== Research ==
Automotive-related research institutes in Taiwan are Automotive Research & Testing Center and Industrial Technology Research Institute.

== Taipei AMPA ==
The Taipei AMPA (Taipei International Automobile & Motorcycle Parts & Accessories Show) is one of the largest automotive parts trade fairs in Asia, organized annually by the Taiwan External Trade Development Council (TAITRA) in Taipei. First held in 1984, the show has grown into a major platform for Taiwan’s automotive and motorcycle components industry, attracting over 1,400 exhibitors and tens of thousands of professional visitors each year. Since 2007 it has been co‑located with Autotronics Taipei and later integrated with events such as Motorcycle Taiwan and 2035 E‑Mobility Taiwan, highlighting innovations in electric vehicles, connected mobility, and sustainable manufacturing. Key features include the Innovation Awards, the Cross‑Strait Pavilion, and Buyers’ Night networking events, while recent editions have introduced hybrid online–offline formats and ESG‑focused initiatives to reflect global trends in the automotive supply chain.

== See also ==
- List of Taiwanese automakers
- Defense industry of Taiwan
