= SOIC =

SOIC may stand for:

- Ship and Ocean Industries R&D Center, a research center in Taiwan
- Small outline integrated circuit, a carrier which occupies an area about 30 - 50% less than an equivalent DIP, with a typical thickness that is 70% less
- Svenska Ostindiska Companiet, the Swedish East India Company, founded by Scot Colin Campbell
