= Taiwan New Car Assessment Program =

Vehicle safety rating program in Taiwan

- 臺灣新車安全評等制度
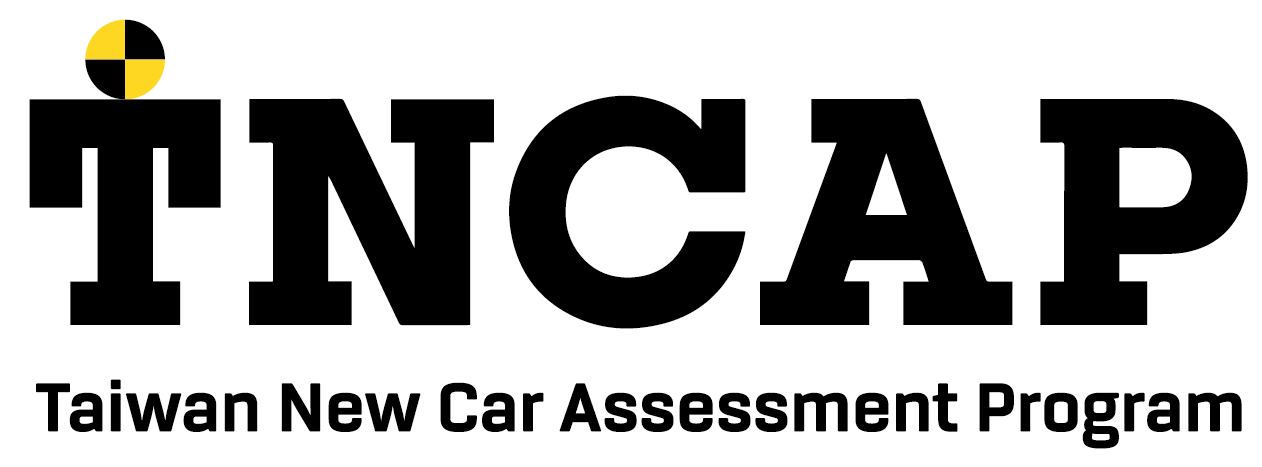
- Formation: August 26, 2022; 4 years ago
- Location: Lukang, Changhua County, Taiwan
- Website: tncap.org.tw

The Taiwan New Car Assessment Program (TNCAP; traditional Chinese: 臺灣新車安全評等制度; simplified Chinese: 台湾新车安全评等制度; pinyin: Táiwān Xīnchē Ānquán Píng Děng Zhìdù) is a vehicle safety rating program for vehicles sold in Taiwan, similar to the New Car Assessment Program (NCAP) in other countries. It is administered by the Ministry of Transportation and Communications and conducted in the Automotive Research & Testing Center in Lukang, Changhua County, Taiwan.

== History ==
In 2016, a petition about the safety of domestically manufactured vehicles was passed on the Public Policy Participation Platform. The petition demanded that the crash test results of domestically manufactured vehicles performed by the Automotive Research & Testing Center (ARTC) should be compulsorily released.

The Ministry of Transportation and Communications (MOTC) replied to the petition that such system would be similar to NCAP of other countries, and it would need "enormous budget" to carry out. They evaluated that there was not an immediate need for a NCAP in Taiwan, and encouraged manufacturers to release crash test results themselves.

In 2017, another petition about establishing Taiwan NCAP (TW-NCAP) was passed on the Public Policy Participation Platform. The petition mentioned that neighboring countries like China, Japan, Korea and even ASEAN countries have their own NCAP, for example C-NCAP and ASEAN NCAP, then Taiwan should also have its own NCAP to test domestically manufactured vehicles.

This petition attracted the attention of the legislature and the MOTC, which both agreed to start working towards establishing TW-NCAP. The MOTC and the Vehicle Safety Certification Center (VSCC) organised a symposium and agreed that TW-NCAP would be modelled after the rating system of Euro NCAP and the organizational structure of Japan NCAP (JNCAP).

In 2018, the Executive Yuan approved the establishment of TNCAP, with a budget of $600 million NTD. On 26 August 2022, the TNCAP Testing Facility was inaugurated in the site of the Automotive Research & Testing Center (ARTC) in Lukang, Changhua County. The first crash test was performed with a Toyota Corolla Cross on 27 October 2022.

== Assessment ==
=== Vehicle selection ===
For Euro NCAP, vehicle models are chosen by member organizations based on the relevancy in their respective domestic markets, and vehicle manufacturers can pay for the testing themselves. TNCAP's vehicle selection works differently by selecting vehicle models that are in the top 8 best selling vehicle models in Taiwan.

In 2024, Nissan X-trail and Honda CR-V became the first two vehicle models to voluntarily apply for TNCAP assessment. This means the manufacturers provided the expense to TNCAP, as required, for the assessment.

Similar to Euro NCAP, test vehicles for TNCAP are purchased anonymously from dealerships, in the same way that consumers do. This task is entrusted to the Consumers’ Foundation, which dispatches undercover shoppers to purchase these vehicles.

In 2024, TNCAP has announced that they selected 8 vehicle models to test in 2025. These vehicles models are MG HS, Tesla Model 3, Honda HR-V, Toyota Vios, Lexus RX, Hyundai Custin, Toyota Town Ace and Hyundai Tucson L.

=== Testing criteria ===
Similar to Euro NCAP, TNCAP performs safety tests in four main criteria, with a percentage score given to each of them. The four main criteria and their respective tests are as follows:

Criteria	Test
Adult Occupant Protection	Frontal Offset Deformable Barrier
Adult Occupant Protection	Frontal Full Width
Adult Occupant Protection	Lateral Impact
Adult Occupant Protection	Lateral Side Pole Impact
Adult Occupant Protection	Whiplash Rear Impact
Adult Occupant Protection	Automatic Emergency Brakes for Low-Speed Systems (AEB City)
Child Occupant Protection	Child Restraint System (CRS) Performance in Frontal and Lateral Impact
Child Occupant Protection	Safety Features
Child Occupant Protection	Child Restraint System (CRS) Installation Check
Vulnerable Road User Protection	Head Impact
Vulnerable Road User Protection	Pelvis Impact
Vulnerable Road User Protection	Leg Impact
Vulnerable Road User Protection	Automatic Emergency Brakes for Pedestrians (AEB Pedestrian)
Vulnerable Road User Protection	Automatic Emergency Brakes for Cyclists (AEB Cyclist)
Safety Assist	Occupant Status Monitoring
Safety Assist	Speed Assistance
Safety Assist	Lane Support
Safety Assist	Automatic Emergency Brakes for Highway Speeds (AEB Inter-Urban)
Safety Assist	Blind Spot Monitoring

Since 2026, TNCAP performs its safety tests under the updated protocol, "TNCAP Version 2", with stricter tests and scoring requirements. Additional tests have been added to TNCAP, such as automatic emergency brakes for cyclists, blind spot detection and electric shock protection for electric vehicles.

=== Test dummy ===
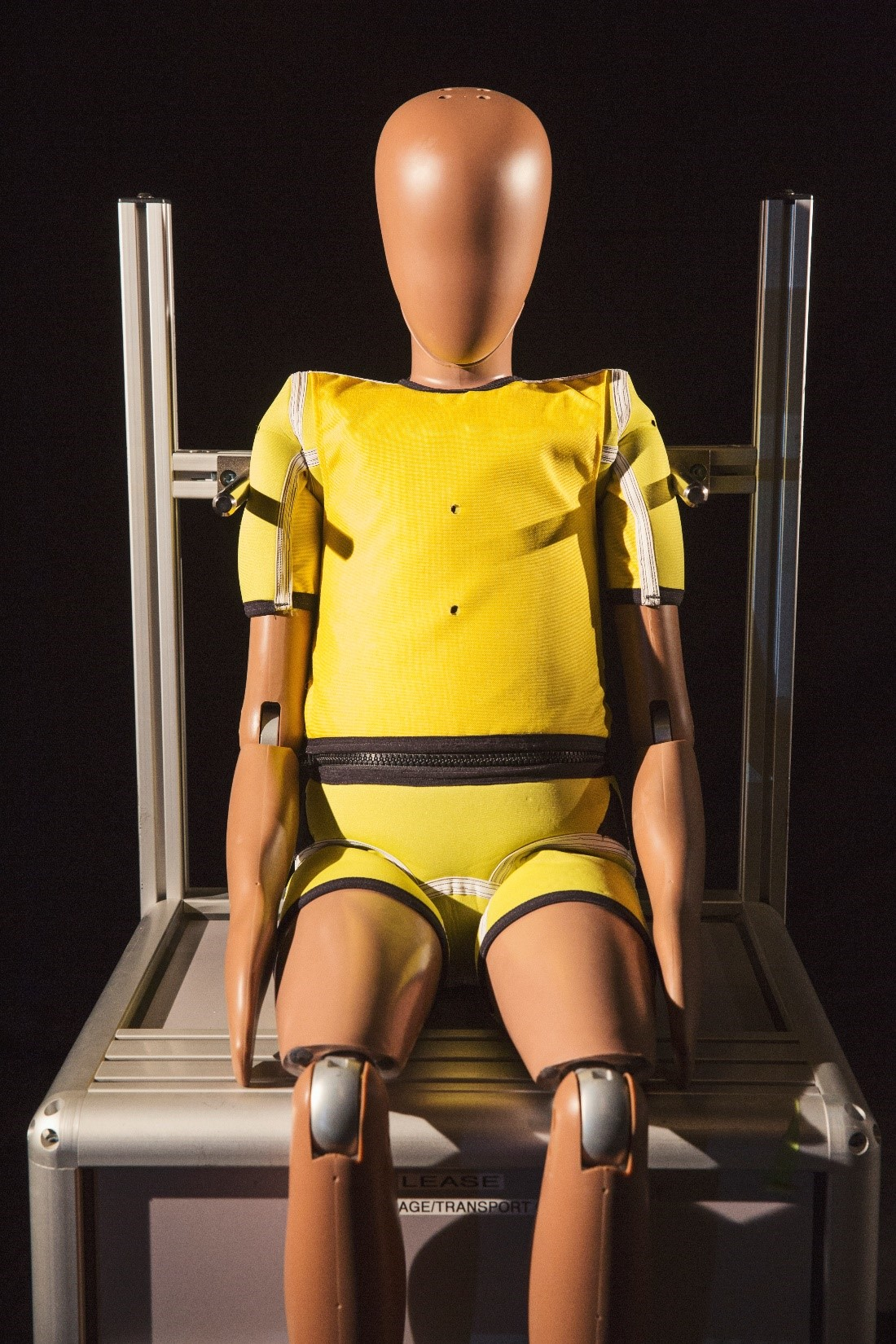
Q10 Child dummy

TNCAP uses the following test dummies from Humanetics for their crash tests:

- Hybrid III — 50th Percentile Male (H3-50M) as the adult driver, front seat or rear seat passenger
- Q10 Child dummy, simulating a 10-year-old child and used as a rear seat passenger
- Q6 Child dummy, simulating a 6-year-old child and used in a car seat at the rear seat

The Q10 and Q6 Child dummies are only used in the "Frontal Offset Deformable Barrier" test and "Lateral Impact" test.

=== Star rating ===
Similar to Euro NCAP, although a percentage score is given to each of the testing criteria, a star rating is used to evaluate the overall safety of a vehicle model. This allows the public to easily differentiate between the safety rating of different models.

The star rating ranges from 0 stars to 5 stars, with 0 stars being the worst and 5 stars being the best.

- 5 stars : Overall excellent performance on crash protection and well equipped with crash avoidance technology
- 4 stars : Overall good performance on crash protection and equipped with some crash avoidance technology
- 3 stars : Above average performance on crash protection, but lacking in crash avoidance technology
- 2 stars : Average performance on crash protection, and lacking in crash avoidance technology
- 1 star : Above basic performance on crash protection
- 0 stars : Meets the minimal standard of safety required by law

== Comparison groups ==
The results are grouped into 3 increasingly demanding classes:

- 2023 – 2025 (similar to Euro NCAP 2017)
- 2026 – 2028 (similar to Euro NCAP 2022)
- 2029 onward

== Safety ratings ==
As of 30 March 2026, TNCAP has tested 27 vehicles models, with fourteen vehicle models receiving 5 stars, six vehicle models receiving 4 stars, five vehicle models receiving 3 stars and two vehicle models receiving 0 stars.

List of vehicles models tested by TNCAP and their safety ratings: Version 1 (2022–2025)
Date	Vehicle		Rating					Ref.
Date	Make	Model	Adult Occupant	Child Occupant	Pedestrian	Safety Assist	Star Rating	Ref.
2023	Toyota	RAV4	87%	85%	84%	69%	5/5 stars	
2023	Toyota	Corolla Cross	85%	80%	82%	68%	5/5 stars	
2023	Toyota	Corolla Altis	91%	82%	84%	68%	5/5 stars	
2023	Honda	CR-V	73%	52%	72%	40%	3/5 stars	
2023	Ford	Kuga	87%	48%	76%	57%	3/5 stars	
2023	Ford	Focus	94%	89%	82%	93%	5/5 stars	
2023	Nissan	Kicks	81%	84%	81%	59%	5/5 stars	
2023	Toyota	Yaris	76%	31%	59%	25%	3/5 stars	
2024	Lexus	NX	93%	88%	83%	72%	5/5 stars	
2024	Honda	Fit	81%	72%	81%	67%	4/5 stars	
2024	Nissan	X-Trail	96%	68%	72%	84%	4/5 stars	
2024	Toyota	Sienta	78%	69%	65%	42%	4/5 stars	
2024	Tesla	Model Y	97%	89%	78%	79%	5/5 stars	
2024	Honda	CR-V	97%	89%	75%	69%	5/5 stars	
2025	Tesla	Model 3	97%	89%	77%	79%	5/5 stars	
2025	Honda	HR-V	81%	69%	79%	68%	4/5 stars	
2025	Nissan	Sentra	93%	77%	80%	70%	5/5 stars	
2025	Toyota	Vios	71%	71%	66%	25%	3/5 stars	
2025	Lexus	RX	94%	89%	84%	72%	5/5 stars	
2025	Toyota	Town Ace	15%	61%	50%	25%	0/5 stars	
2025	MG	HS	90%	89%	74%	71%	5/5 stars	
2025	Hyundai	Custin	74%	75%	67%	69%	4/5 stars	
2025	Hyundai	Tucson L	72%	55%	52%	71%	3/5 stars	
2025	Toyota	Yaris Cross	80%	71%	82%	66%	4/5 stars	
2025	Luxgen	n7	90%	87%	68%	86%	5/5 stars	

List of vehicles models tested by TNCAP and their safety ratings: Version 2 (2026–)
Date	Vehicle		Rating					Ref.
Date	Make	Model	Adult Occupant	Child Occupant	Vulnerable Road User	Safety Assist	Star Rating	Ref.
2026	CMC	Zinger	43%	33%	40%	0%	0/5 stars	
2026	Tesla	Model Y	93%	89%	75%	71%	5/5 stars	
2026	Mercedes-Benz	GLC	95%	93%	71%	76%	5/5 stars	
2026	Kia	Sportage	73%	51%	69%	52%	2/5 stars	
2026	MG	ZS	56%	89%	45%	25%	0/5 stars	

=== Future ===
TNCAP has announced that they selected 10 vehicle models to test in 2026. These vehicles models are Tesla Model Y, Mitsubishi Zinger, Mercedes-Benz GLC, Kia Sportage, Volvo XC40, MG ZS, Lexus UX, Volkswagen Golf, Luxgen n7 and Mazda CX-5.
