= Lexus NX =

Compact luxury crossover SUV

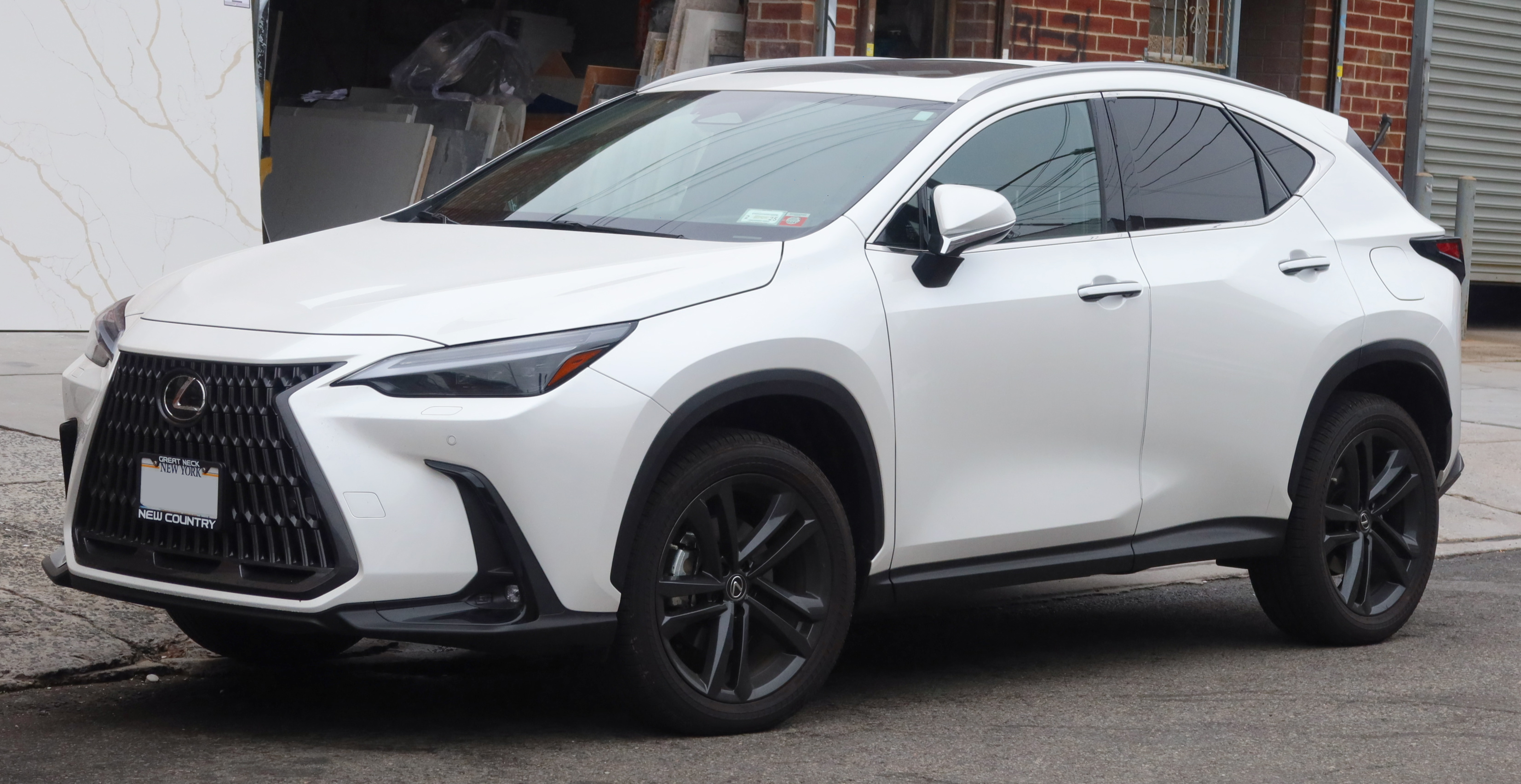
- 2023 Lexus NX 450h (AAZH26, US)

Overview
- Manufacturer: Toyota
- Production: August 2014 – present
- Model years: 2015–present

Body and chassis
- Class: Compact luxury crossover SUV
- Body style: 5-door SUV
- Layout: Front-engine, all-wheel-drive; Front-engine, front-wheel-drive

The Lexus NX (Japanese: レクサス・NX, Hepburn: Rekusasu NX) is a compact luxury crossover SUV sold by Lexus, a luxury division of Toyota. Introduced in late 2014, it is positioned between the subcompact UX and the mid-size RX in Lexus’ crossover SUV lineup.

According to Lexus, the name "NX" stands for "Nimble Crossover".

== First generation (AZ10; 2014) ==
First generation
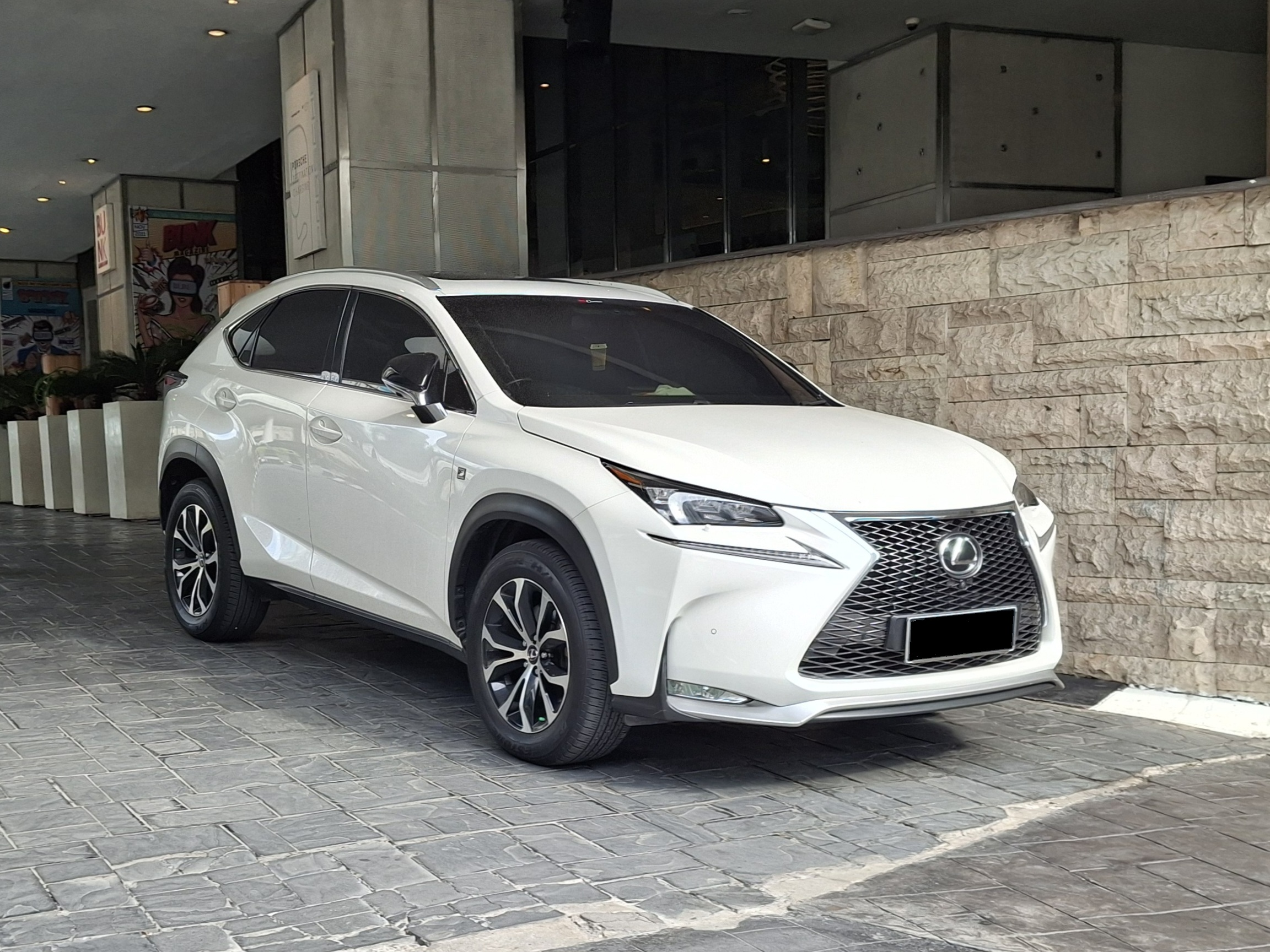
- Pre-facelift Lexus NX 200t F Sport (AGZ10, Indonesia)

Overview
- Model code: AZ10
- Production: August 2014 – November 2021
- Model years: 2015–2021
- Assembly: Japan: Miyawaka, Fukuoka (Toyota Motor Kyushu); Tahara, Aichi (Tahara plant); India: Bidadi, Karnataka (2020–2021, CKD)
- Designer: Nobuyuki Tomatsu (2012)

Body and chassis
- Platform: Toyota New MC platform
- Related: Toyota Harrier (XU60); Toyota RAV4 (XA40)

Powertrain
- Engine: Gasoline: 1986 cc 3ZR-FAE I4 (NX 200; ZGZ10); 1998 cc 8AR-FTS turbo I4 (NX 200t/300; AGZ10/15); Gasoline hybrid: 2494 cc 2AR-FXE I4 (NX 300h; AYZ10/15)
- Electric motor: 105 kW (141 hp; 143 PS) 2JM synchronous (NX 300h, front); 50 kW (67 hp; 68 PS) 2FM synchronous (NX 300h, rear)
- Power output: 110 kW (148 hp; 150 PS) (NX 200); 175 kW (235 hp; 238 PS) (NX 200t/300); 112 kW (150 hp; 152 PS) (NX 300h, gasoline engine only); 145 kW (194 hp; 197 PS) (NX 300h, combined system output)
- Transmission: 6-speed U661 E/F automatic (NX 200t/300); CVT (NX 200); eCVT (NX 300h)
- Hybrid drivetrain: Power-split (NX 300h)
- Battery: 6.5 Ah (1.6 kW·h) 244.8 V NiMH (NX 300h)

Dimensions
- Wheelbase: 2,660 mm (104.7 in)
- Length: 4,640 mm (182.7 in)
- Width: 1,845 mm (72.6 in)
- Height: 1,645 mm (64.8 in)
- Curb weight: 1,710–1,850 kg (3,770–4,079 lb)

=== Overview ===
The first-generation NX was revealed at the Beijing International Automotive Exhibition on 20 April 2014. The NX shares a small portion of parts with the Toyota RAV4 primarily related to the structure and wheelbase, while the styling, suspension parts, some engines, interior, and level of luxury and craftsmanship are unique to the Lexus. The NX variants sold in the United States feature slightly altered fascias, which facilitate higher departure angles, allowing it to be identified by the US EPA as a "light truck". US sales began in November 2014. Production commenced on 8 August 2014 at Toyota Motor Kyushu's Miyata plant.

In September 2017, the NX received a mid-life facelift. The front bumper, grille, and headlamps were revised, as were the taillights and dashboard. The tailgate also received new sheetmetal, echoing Lexus "spindle motif" grille design. Equipment levels were also boosted, with a new safety package (Lexus Safety System +) and an optional head-up display becoming available.

=== Powertrains ===
The first-generation NX is available in three powertrains; which are designated NX 200t/300, NX 300h, and NX 200.

The NX 200t/300 is powered by a 2.0-liter 8AR-FTS turbocharged four-cylinder direct injection engine that can run on both Otto and Atkinson cycles. This engine has Lexus' Economy with Superior Thermal Efficient Combustion (ESTEC) direct injection with turbo (D-4ST) fuel injection. With separate twin injectors for both direct and port injection, ESTEC D-4ST could perform high-pressure direct injection into the cylinder and conventional intake port injection, or direct cylinder injection only, according to engine speed. Mated to a 6-speed automatic transmission, this engine produces 175 kW (235 hp; 238 PS) at 4,800–5,600 rpm and 350 N⋅m (258 lb⋅ft) at 1,650–4,000 rpm. The NX200t name was used until the September 2017 facelift, after which the car was marketed as the NX 300 instead so as to unify marketing efforts with the 300h.

The NX 300h is powered by a 2.5-liter 2AR-FXE engine mated to an electric motor and CVT that puts out a combined power output of 145 kW (194 hp; 197 PS).

In addition, the NX 200 with a 2.0-liter 3ZR-FAE naturally aspirated four-cylinder engine producing 110 kW (148 hp; 150 PS) is available in the Russian market and in China.

=== Gallery ===
Pre-facelift (2014–2017)

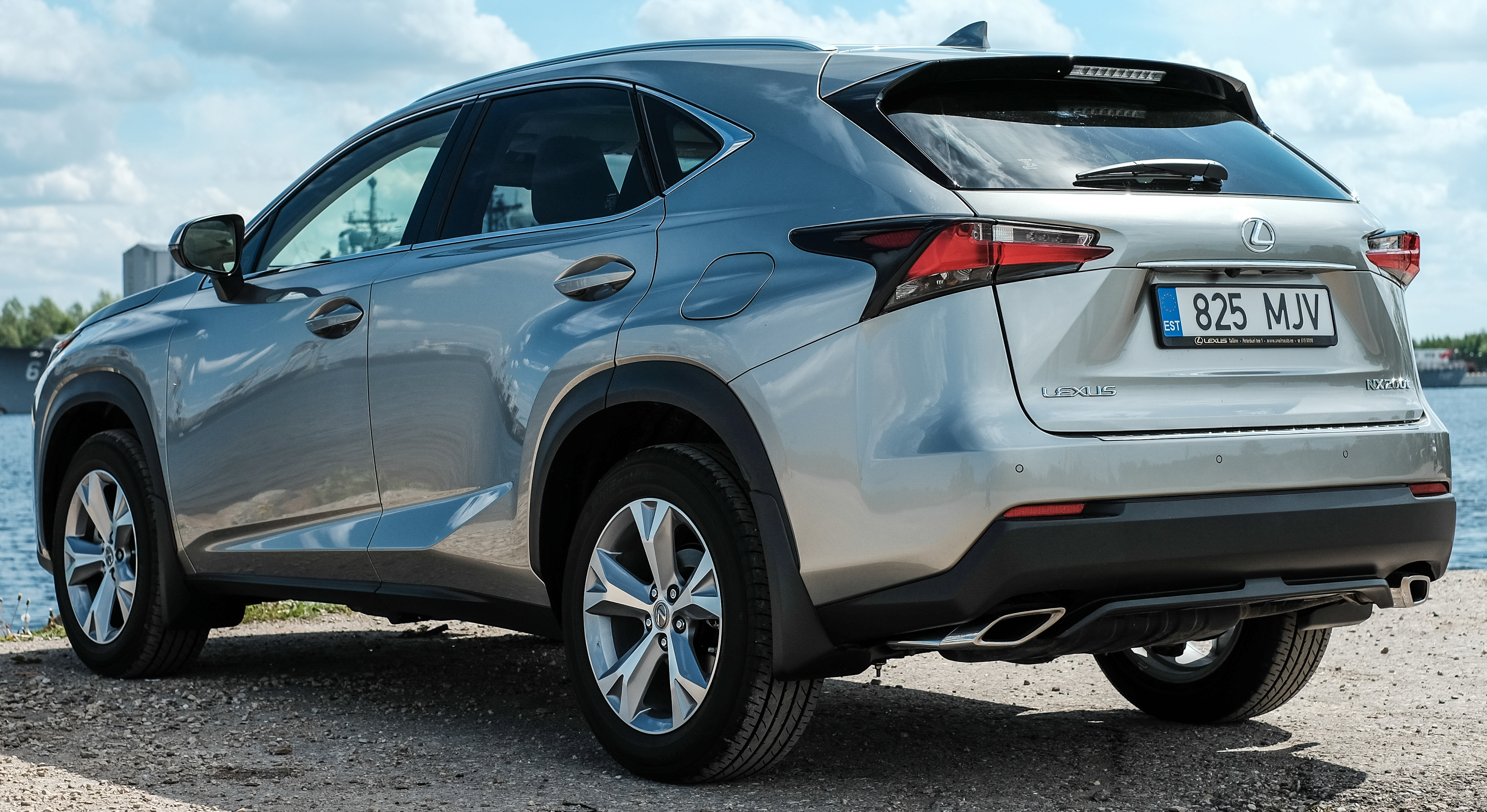
NX 200t (AGZ10, Estonia)

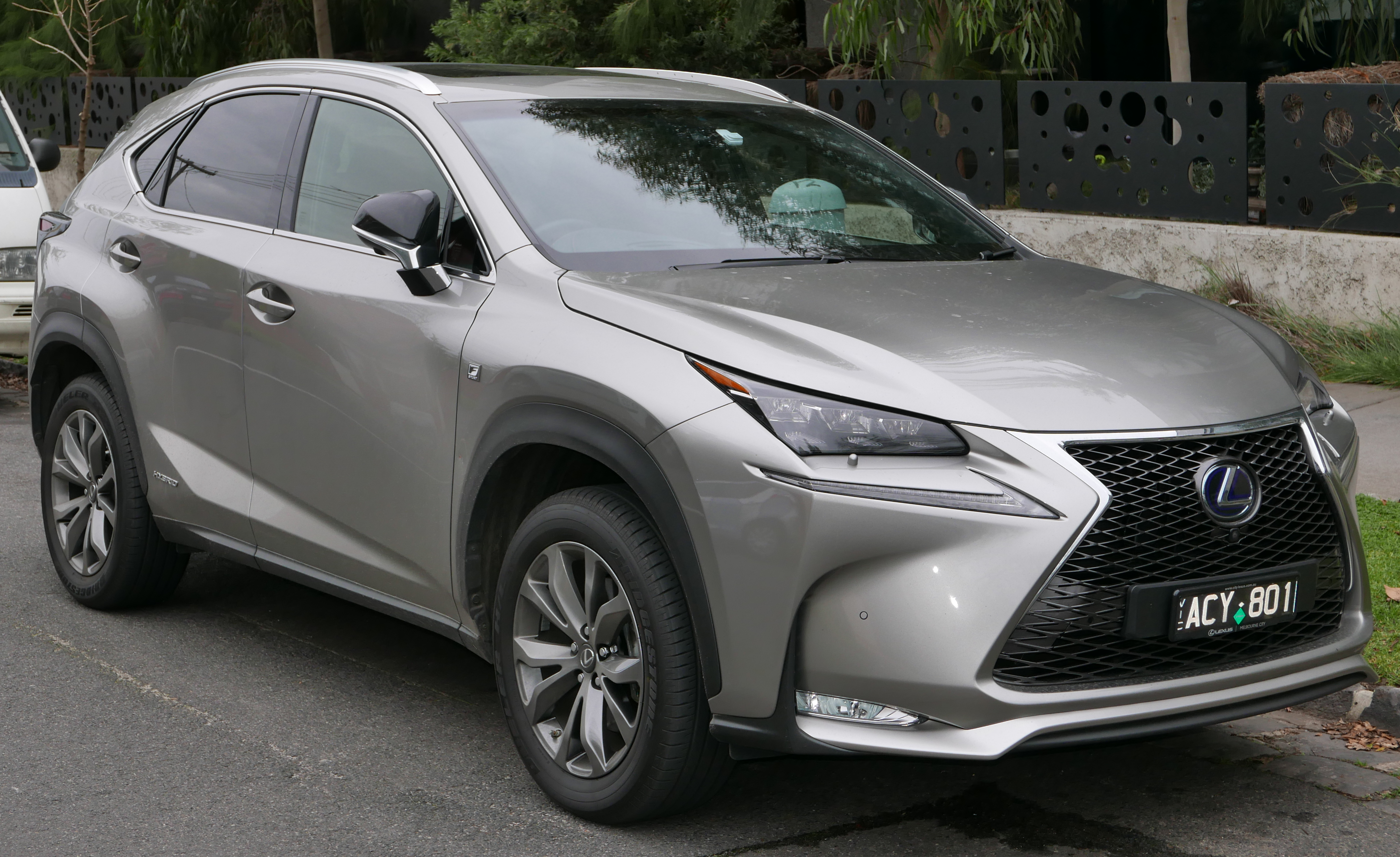
NX 300h F Sport AWD (AYZ15, Australia)

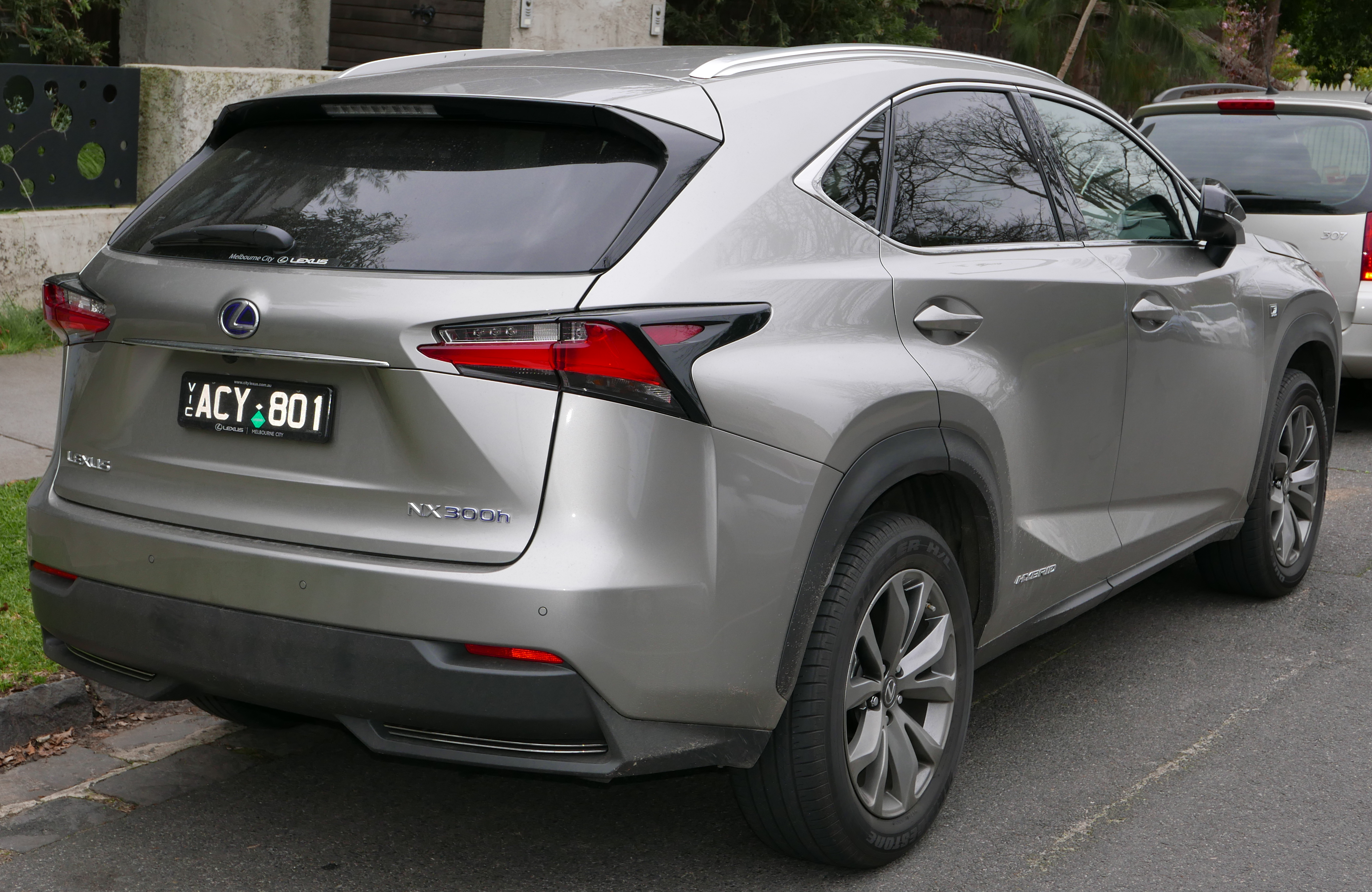
NX 300h F Sport AWD (AYZ15, Australia)

Facelift (2017–2021)

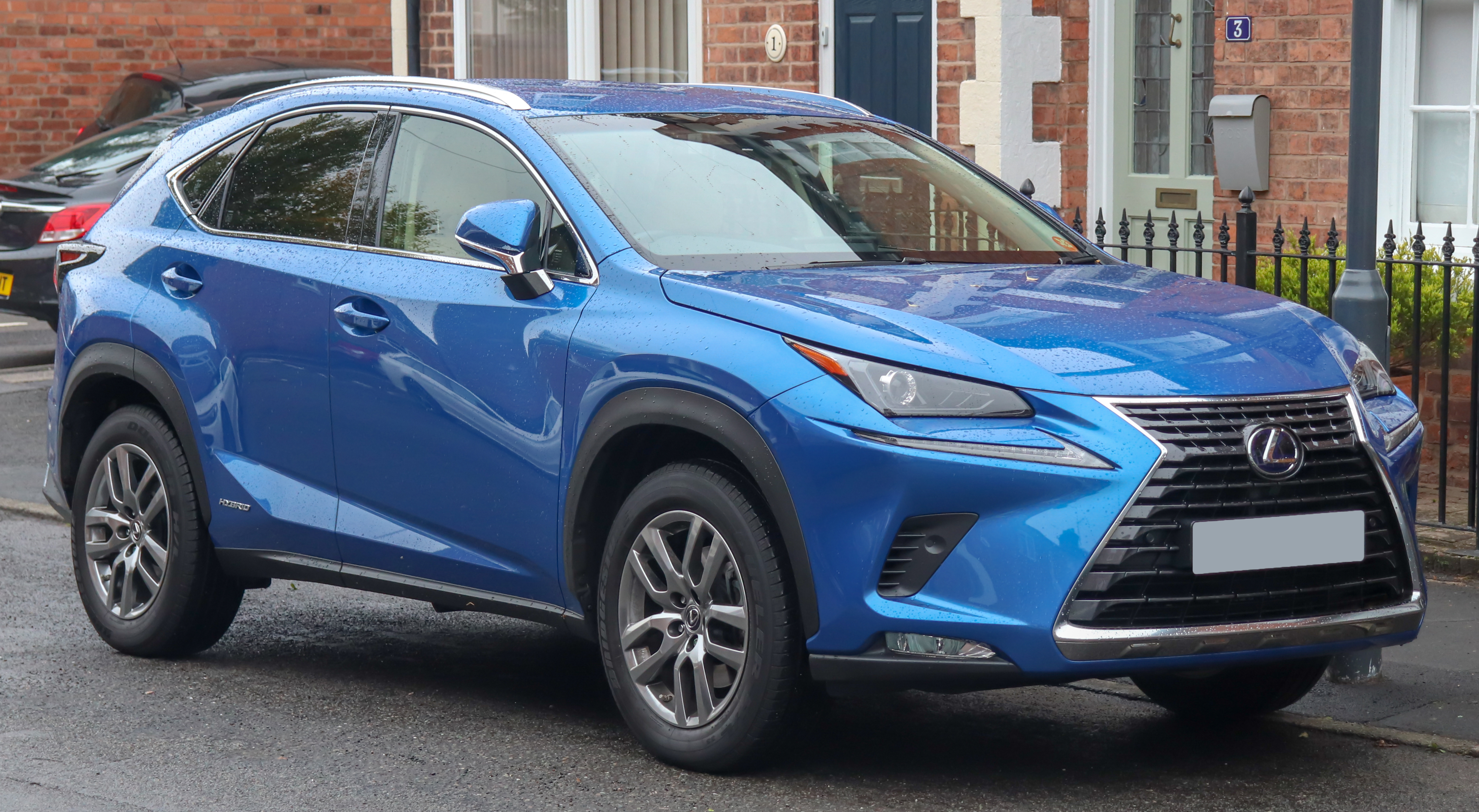
NX 300h Luxury (AYZ10, UK)

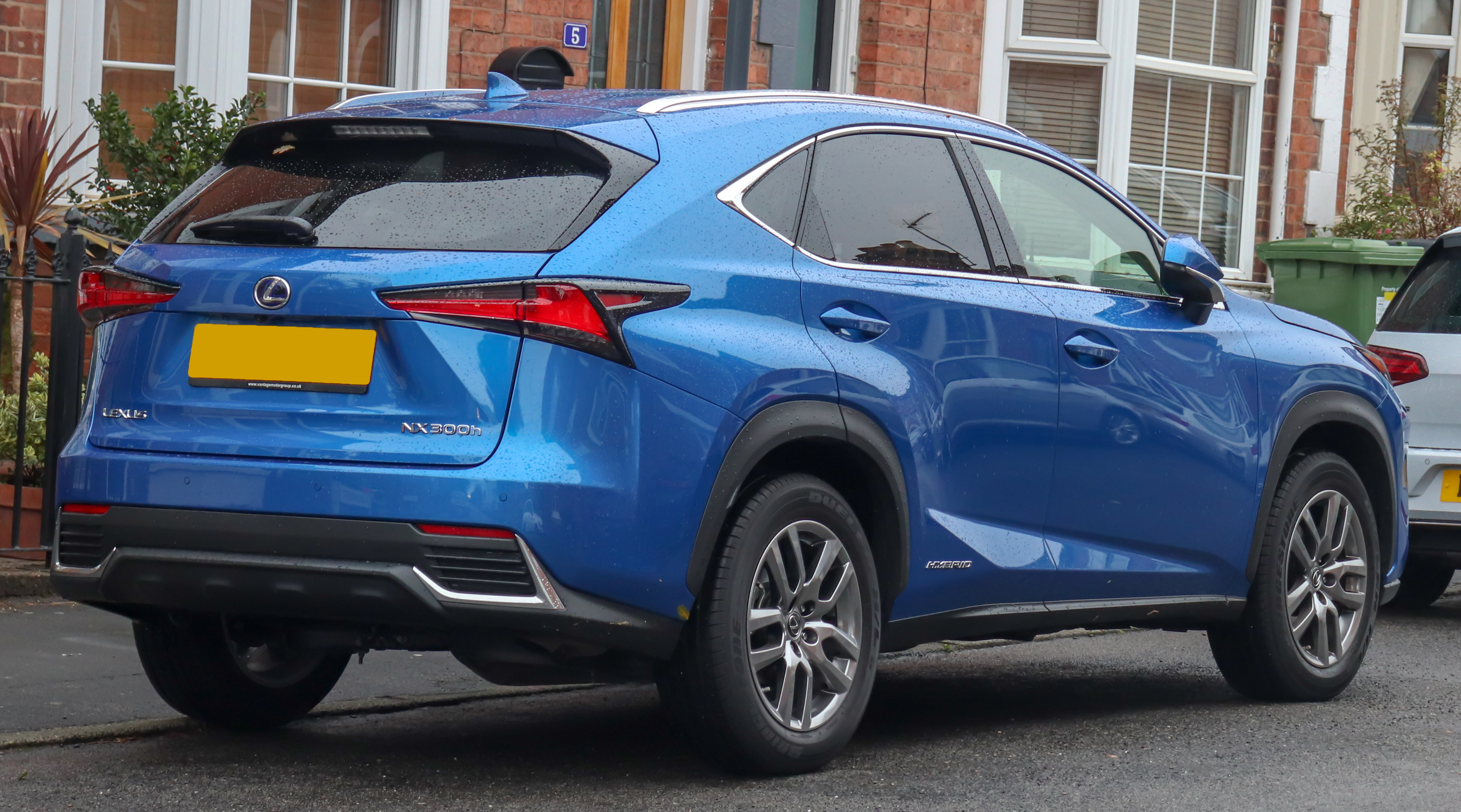
NX 300h Luxury (AYZ10, UK)

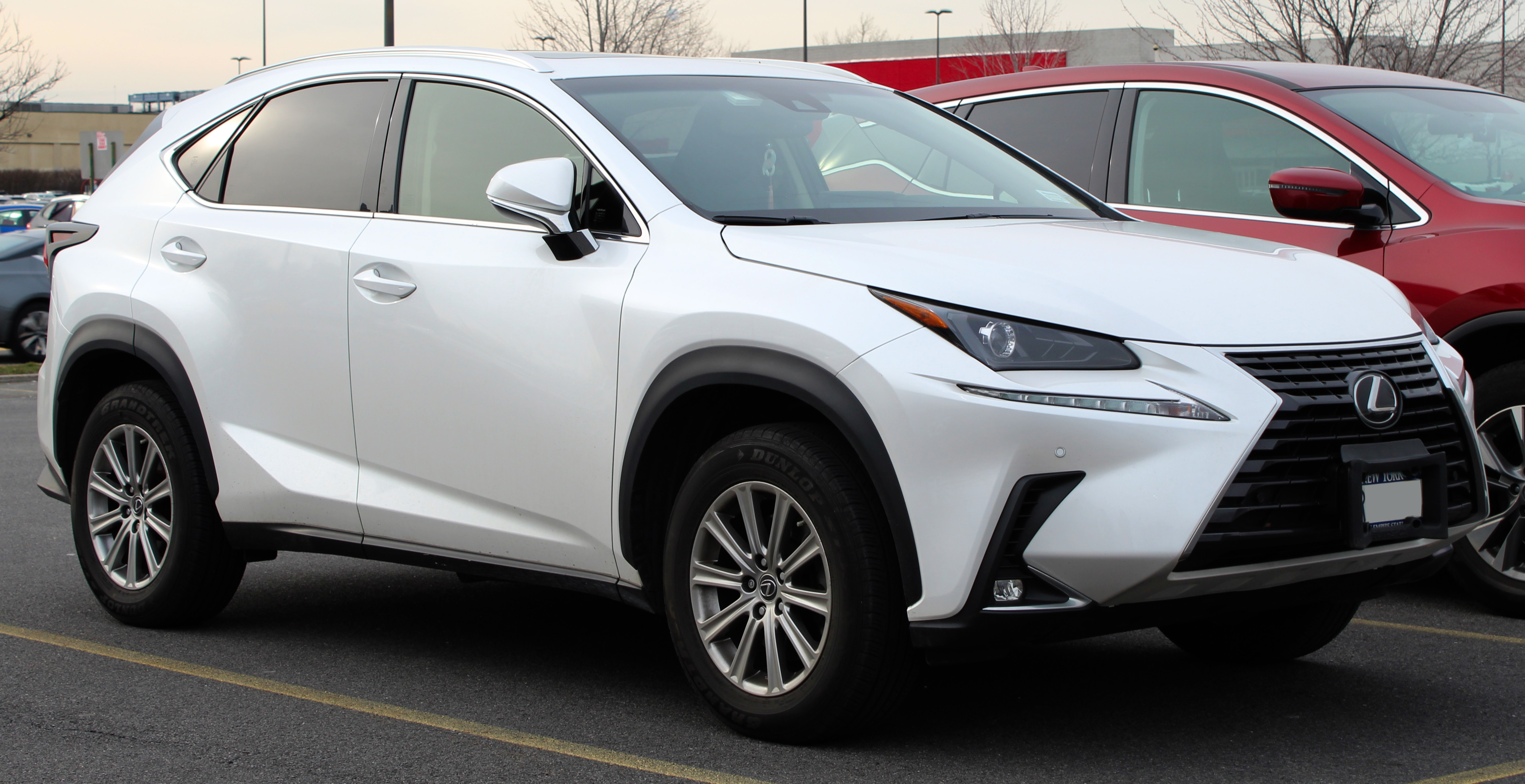
NX 300 with US-specific front bumper (AGZ10)

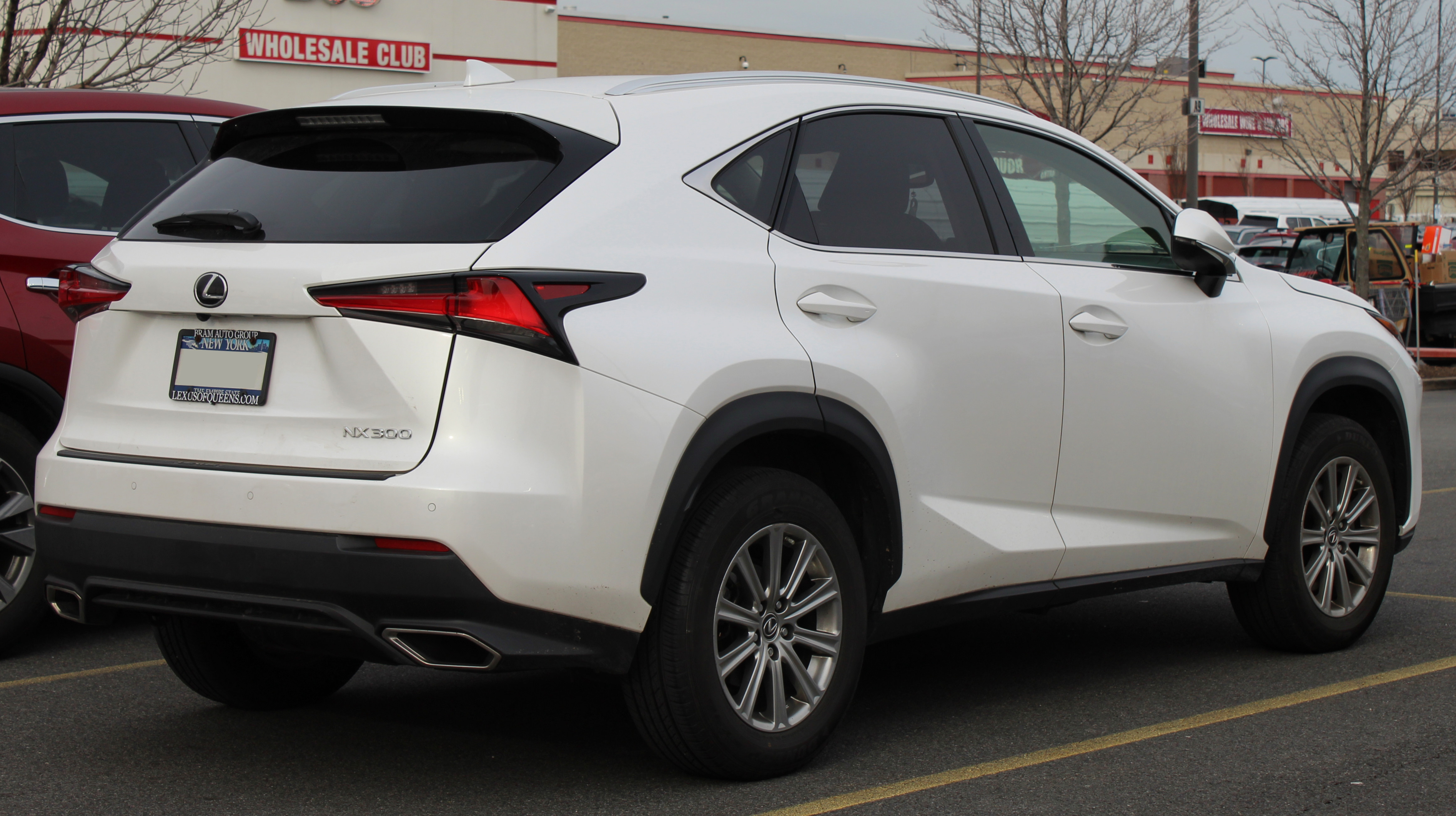
NX 300 (AGZ10, US)

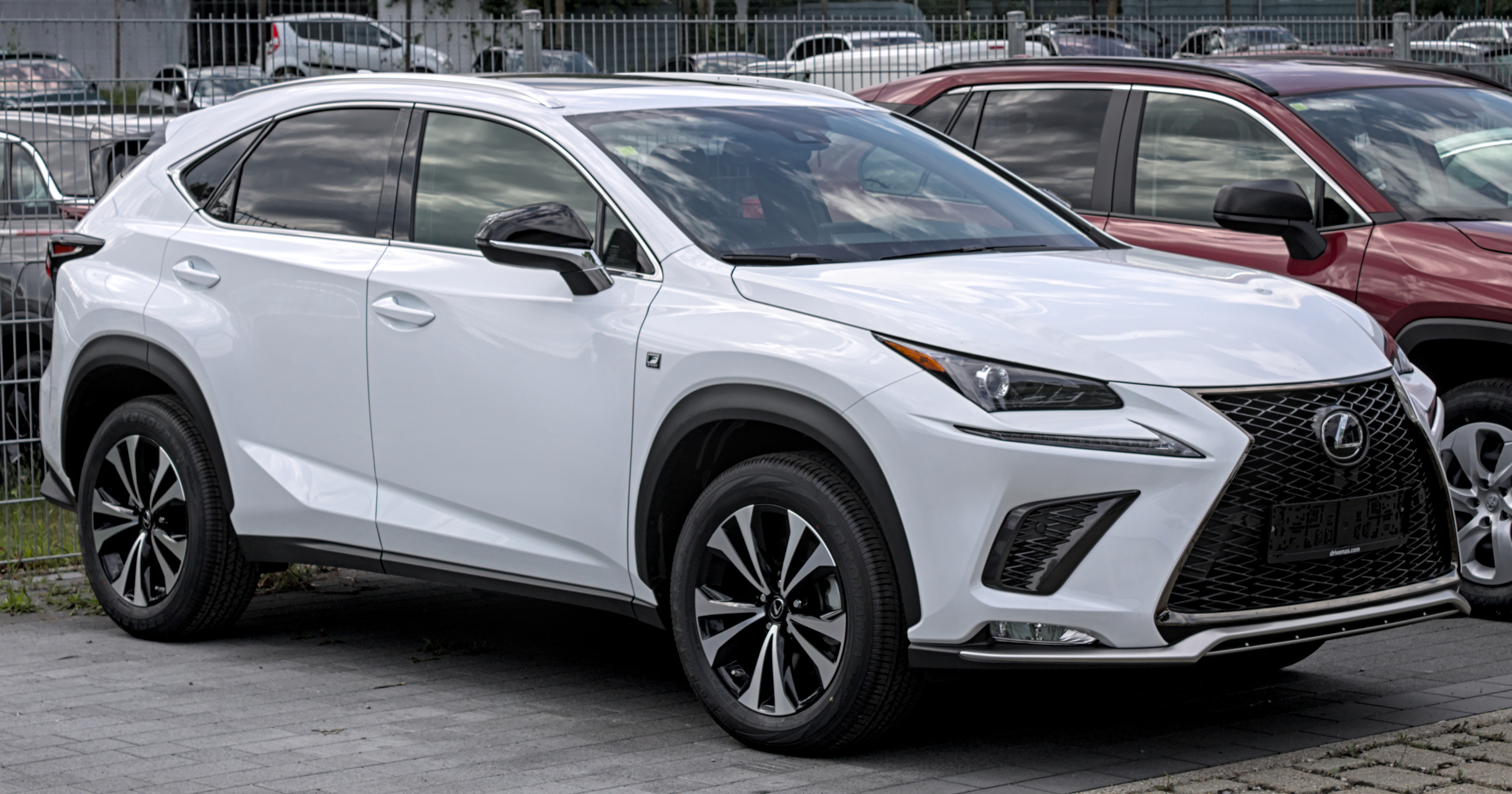
NX 300 F Sport (AGZ10, Germany)

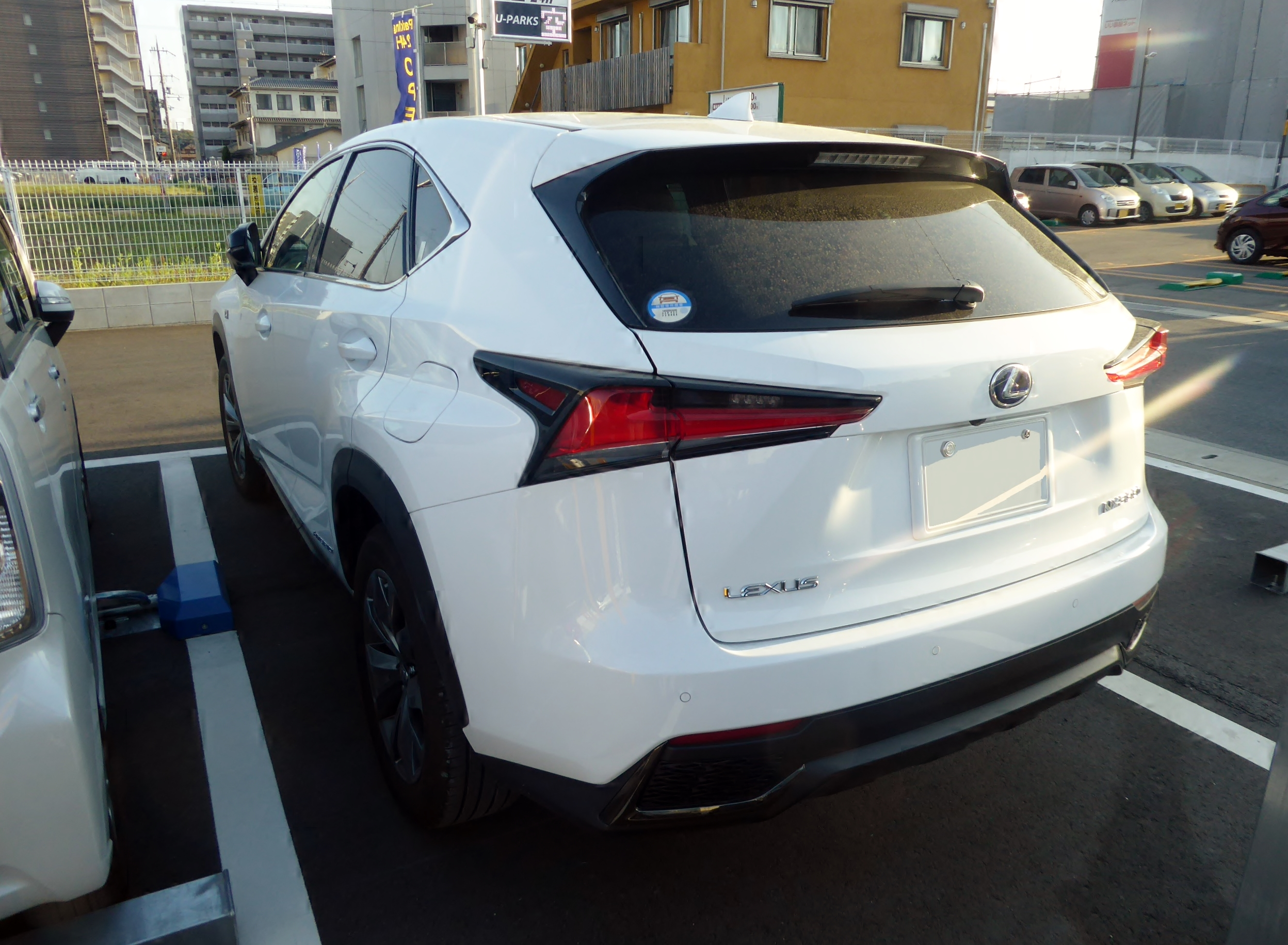
NX 300h F Sport (AYZ10, Japan)

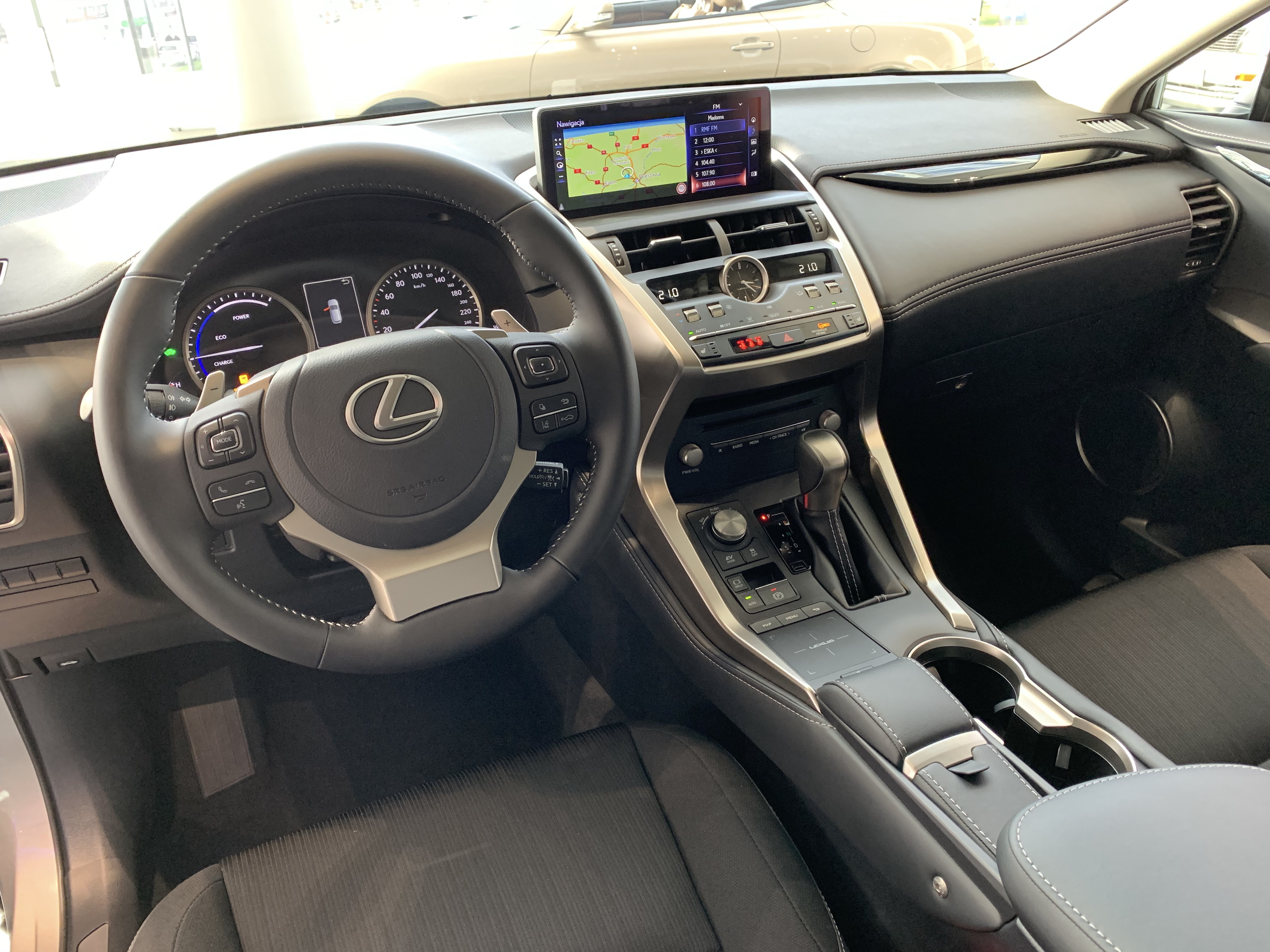
Interior

=== Safety ===
==== ANCAP ====
ANCAP test results Lexus NX all variants (2015)
Test	Score
Overall	5 /5 stars
Frontal offset	14.39/16
Side impact	16/16
Pole	2/2
Seat belt reminders	3/3
Whiplash protection	Good
Pedestrian protection	Adequate
Electronic stability control	Standard

ANCAP test results Lexus NX all variants (2017)
Test	Score
Overall	5 /5 stars
Frontal offset	14.39/16
Side impact	16/16
Pole	2/2
Seat belt reminders	3/3
Whiplash protection	Good
Pedestrian protection	Adequate
Electronic stability control	Not Assessed

==== Euro NCAP ====
Euro NCAP test results Lexus NX (2014)
Test	Points	%
Overall:	5 /5 stars	
Adult occupant:	31.4	82%
Child occupant:	40.2	82%
Pedestrian:	25	69%
Safety assist:	9.3	71%

==== IIHS ====
IIHS scores (2015)
Small overlap front (Driver)	Good
Moderate overlap front (original test)	Good
Side (original test)	Good
Roof strength	Good
Head restraints and seats	Good
Front crash prevention (Vehicle-to-Vehicle)	Advanced
Child seat anchors (LATCH) ease of use	Marginal

== Second generation (AZ20; 2021) ==
Second generation
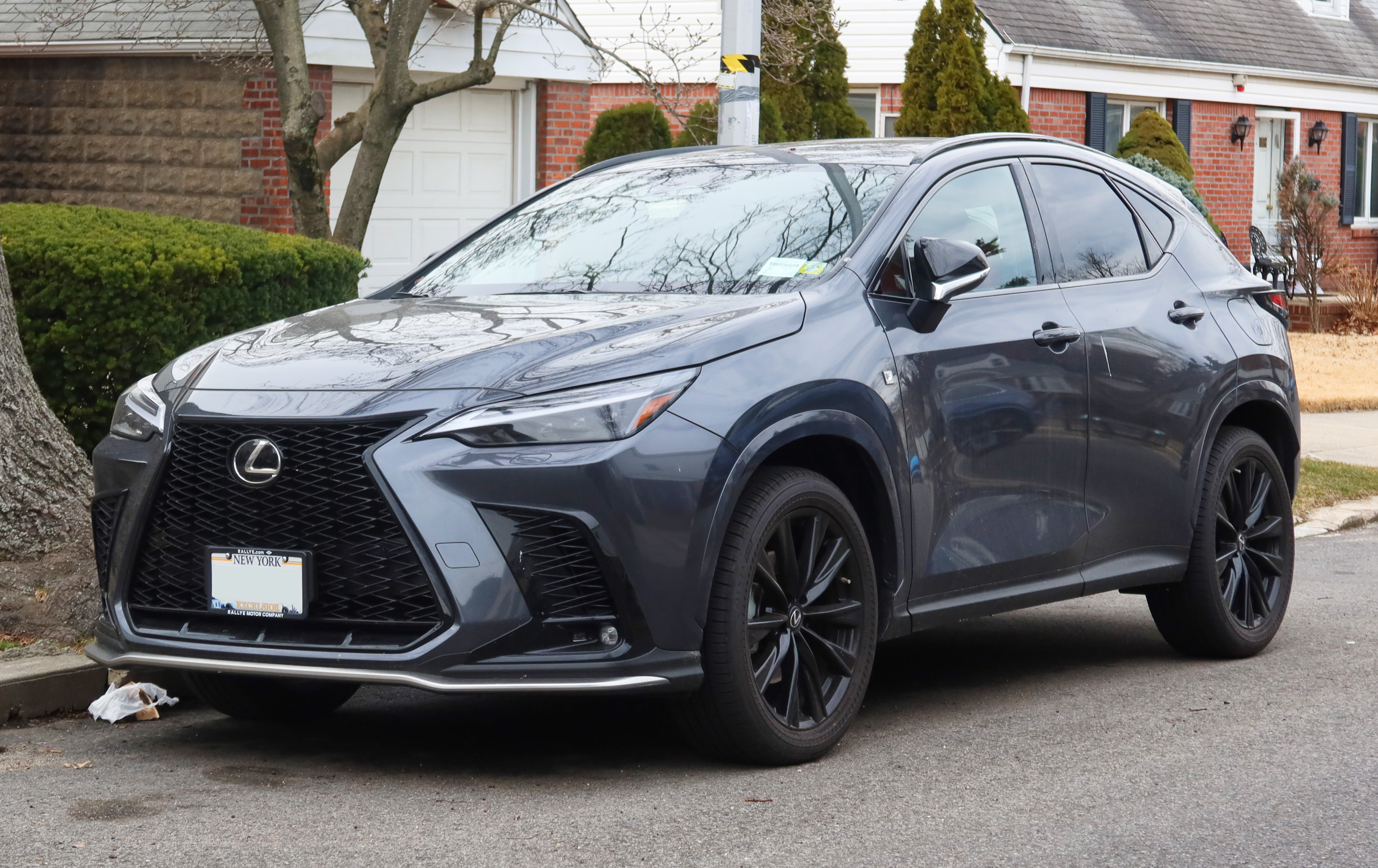
- 2022 Lexus NX 350 F Sport AWD (TAZA25, US)

Overview
- Model code: AZ20
- Production: December 2021 – present
- Model years: 2022–present
- Assembly: Japan: Miyawaka, Fukuoka (TMK); Tahara, Aichi (Tahara plant); Canada: Cambridge, Ontario (TMMC)
- Designer: Tsuneo Kanasugi

Body and chassis
- Platform: TNGA: GA-K
- Related: Toyota Venza/Toyota Harrier(XA80); Toyota RAV4/Wildlander (XA50)

Powertrain
- Engine: Gasoline: 2.0 L M20A-FKS I4 (Taiwan); 2.4 L T24A-FTS turbo I4; 2.5 L A25A-FKS I4; Gasoline hybrid: 2.0 L M20A-FXS I4; 2.5 L A25A-FXS/A25B-FXS I4; Gasoline plug-in hybrid: 2.5 L A25A-FXS/A25B-FXS I4
- Electric motor: 5NM synchronous (front); 4NM synchronous (rear)
- Power output: 127–205 kW (170–275 hp; 173–279 PS) (gasoline); 179–180 kW (240–241 hp; 243–245 PS) (hybrid); 227–240 kW (304–322 hp; 309–326 PS) (plug-in hybrid)
- Transmission: "Direct-Shift" CVT; 8-speed AWF8F35/UA80E "Direct Shift" automatic; eCVT; eAxle
- Hybrid drivetrain: Power-split (NX 350h); Plug-in (NX 400h+/450h+)
- Battery: 1.6 kW·h Li-ion (NX 350h); 18.1 kW·h Li-ion (NX 400h+/450h+)
- Electric range: 88 km (55 miles) (NX 450h+, WLTC)
- Plug-in charging: 6.6 kW AC (1 phase, 230V 32A) (NX 450h+)

Dimensions
- Wheelbase: 2,690 mm (105.9 in)
- Length: 4,660 mm (183.5 in) (2021–2026); 4,690 mm (184.6 in) (2026–present)
- Width: 1,865 mm (73.4 in)
- Height: 1,660–1,670 mm (65.4–65.7 in)
- Curb weight: 1,620–2,130 kg (3,571–4,696 lb)

=== Launch ===
The AZ20 second-generation Lexus NX is a completely new model underpinned by a new platform, the GA-K shared with the mechanically identical Toyota Venza/Harrier and the fifth-generation Toyota RAV4.

Revealed on 11 June 2021, the AZ20 is the first Lexus vehicle to be developed at the Shimoyama Technical Centre. Its exterior dimensions were enlarged by 20 mm (0.8 in) in length and width, while the 2,690 mm (105.9 in) wheelbase is 30 mm (1.2 in) longer than before.

The NX incorporates Lexus' new design philosophy, which includes overlapping L shape daytime running lamps that were first introduced onto the RC and UX in 2018. 3-LED headlights are standard. According to Lexus, the hood section has been extended to the edge of the front end, while the grille surface has been raised vertically to create a visually longer front end, which also enables more efficient air flow and cooling.

A first in a Lexus production model, the 'L' badge in the rear has been replaced by a spaced out Lexus logotype. This change was done last-minute during development, as a leaked marketing material video in February 2021 shows the vehicle using older 'L' rear badge. The design feature was previewed by the LF-Z Electrified concept from March 2021.

The suspension consists of MacPherson struts in front and a trailing arm, double-wishbone design at the rear with extra tuning for the shock absorbers. The F Sport package comes with Adaptive Variable Suspension (AVS) as standard. Except for the plug-in hybrid model, the steering adopts Lexus’ first variable rack gear to improve high speed stability and quicker cornering response, in addition to easier low speed handling. NVH improvements was done, with Lexus claiming that the air flow and wind noise entering into the cabin has been reduced by around 15 percent.

F Sport models receive the driving modes: Normal, Eco, EV, Sport, Sport S+.

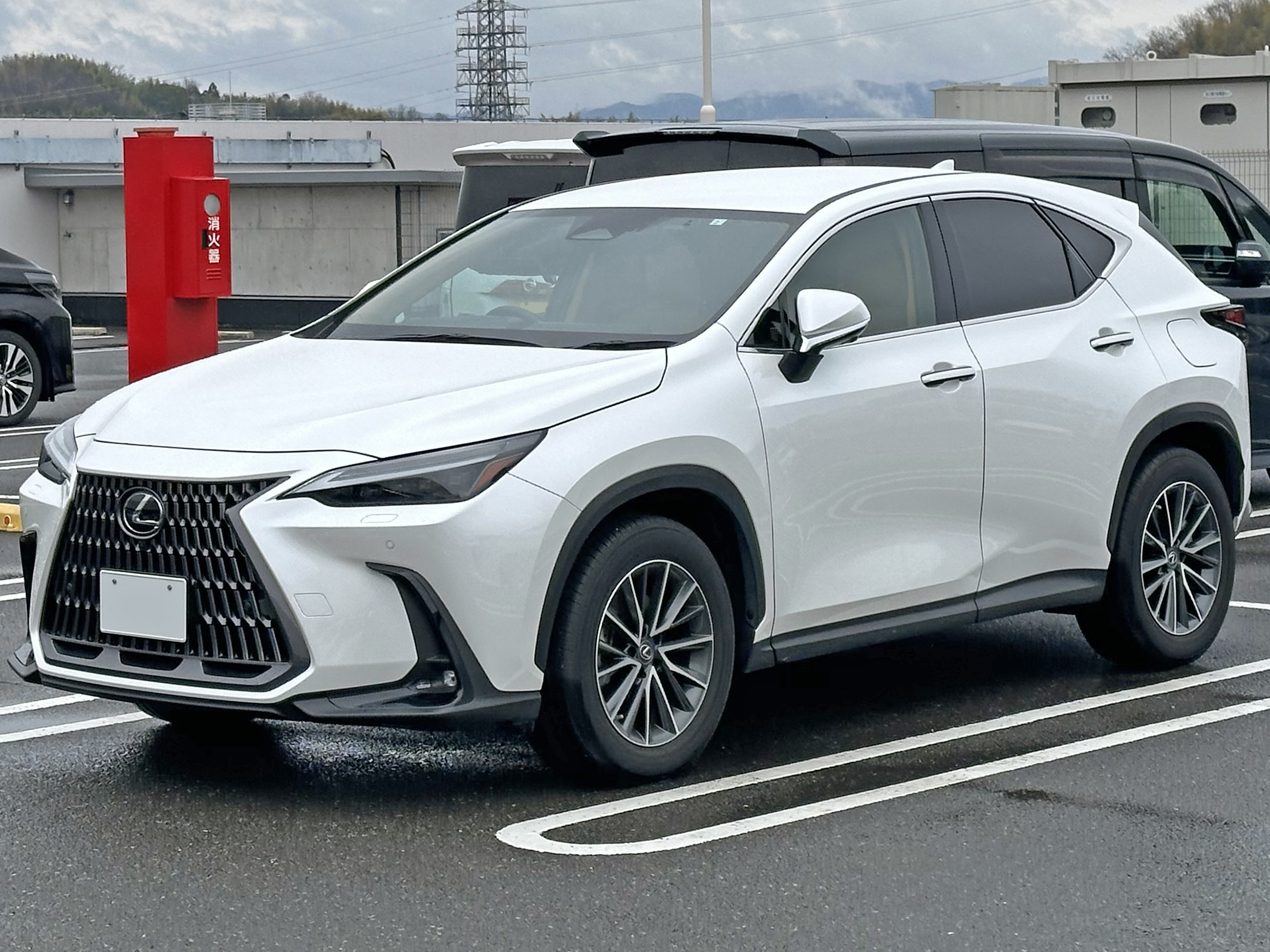
Lexus NX 250 "version L" (AAZA20, Japan)

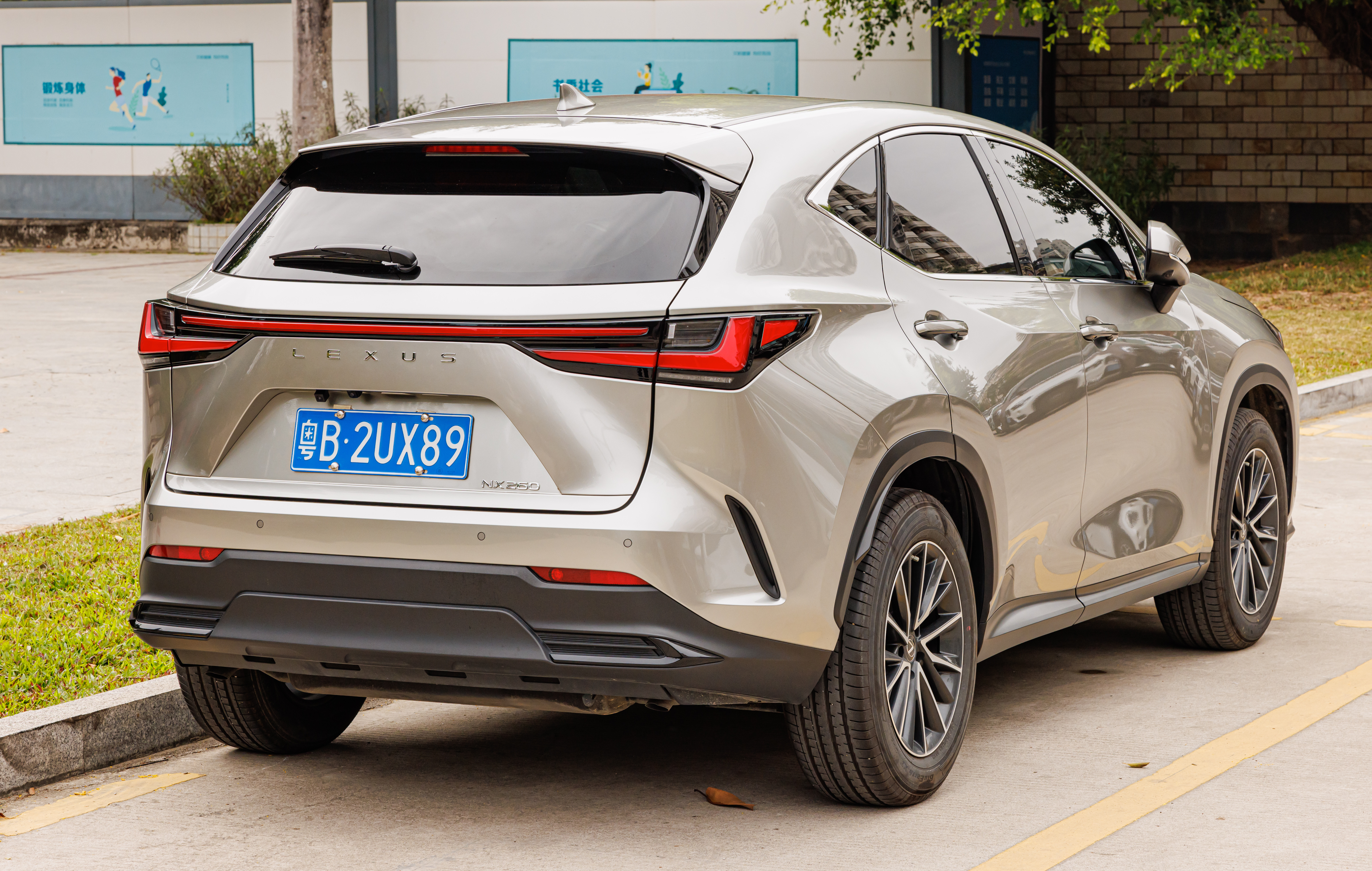
Lexus NX 260 (AAZA20, China)

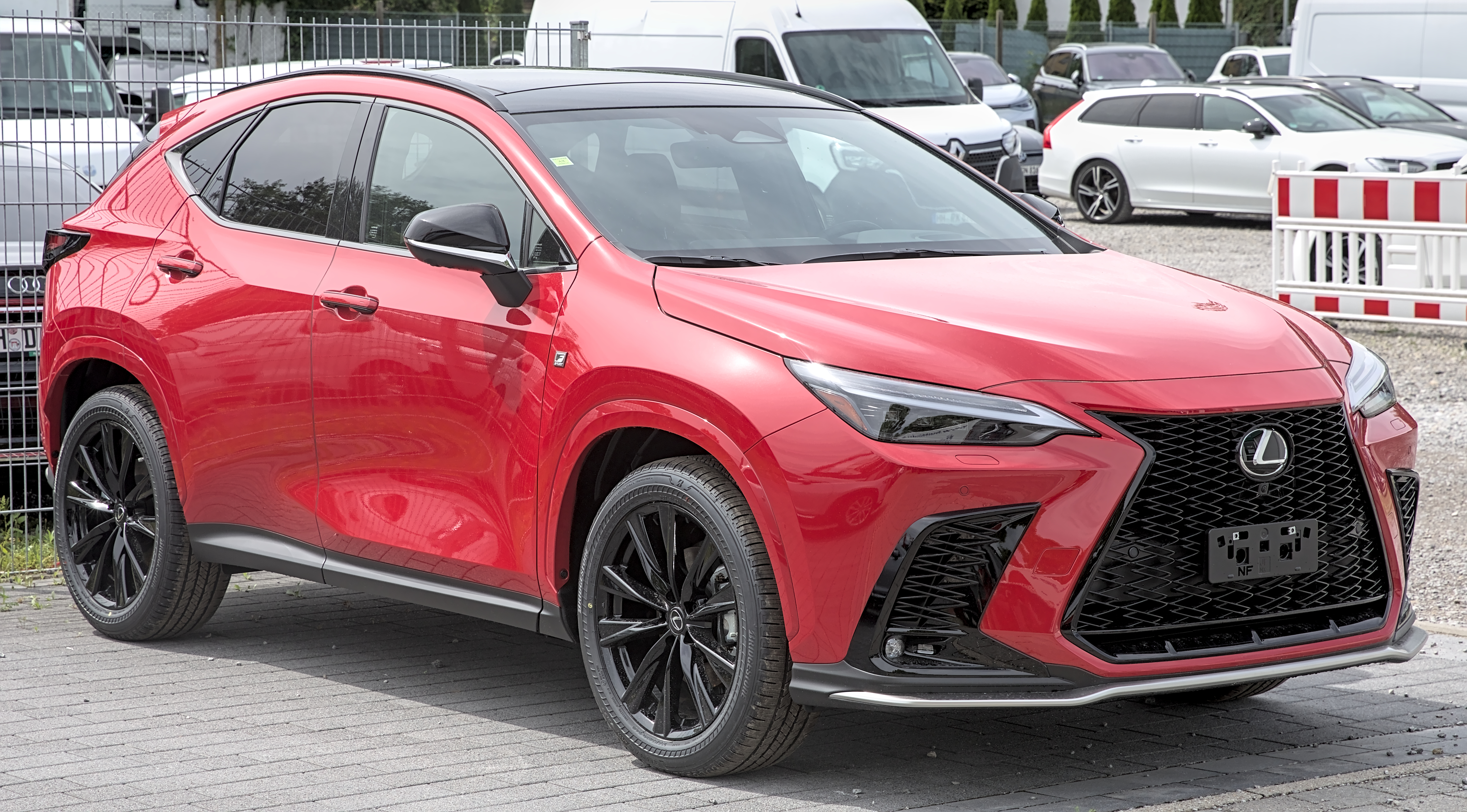
Lexus NX 350 F Sport (TAZA25, Germany)

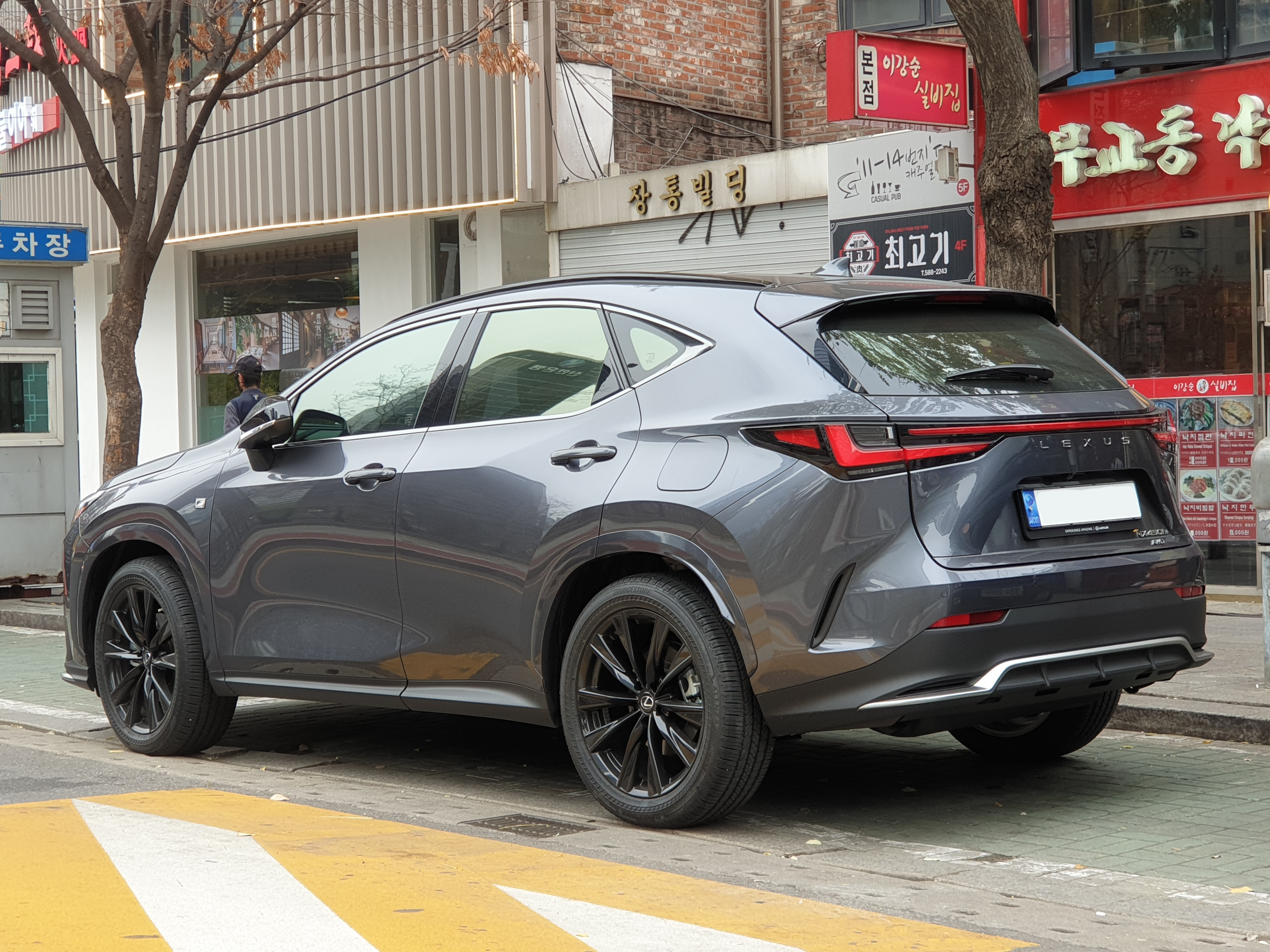
Lexus NX 450h+ F Sport AWD (AAZH26)

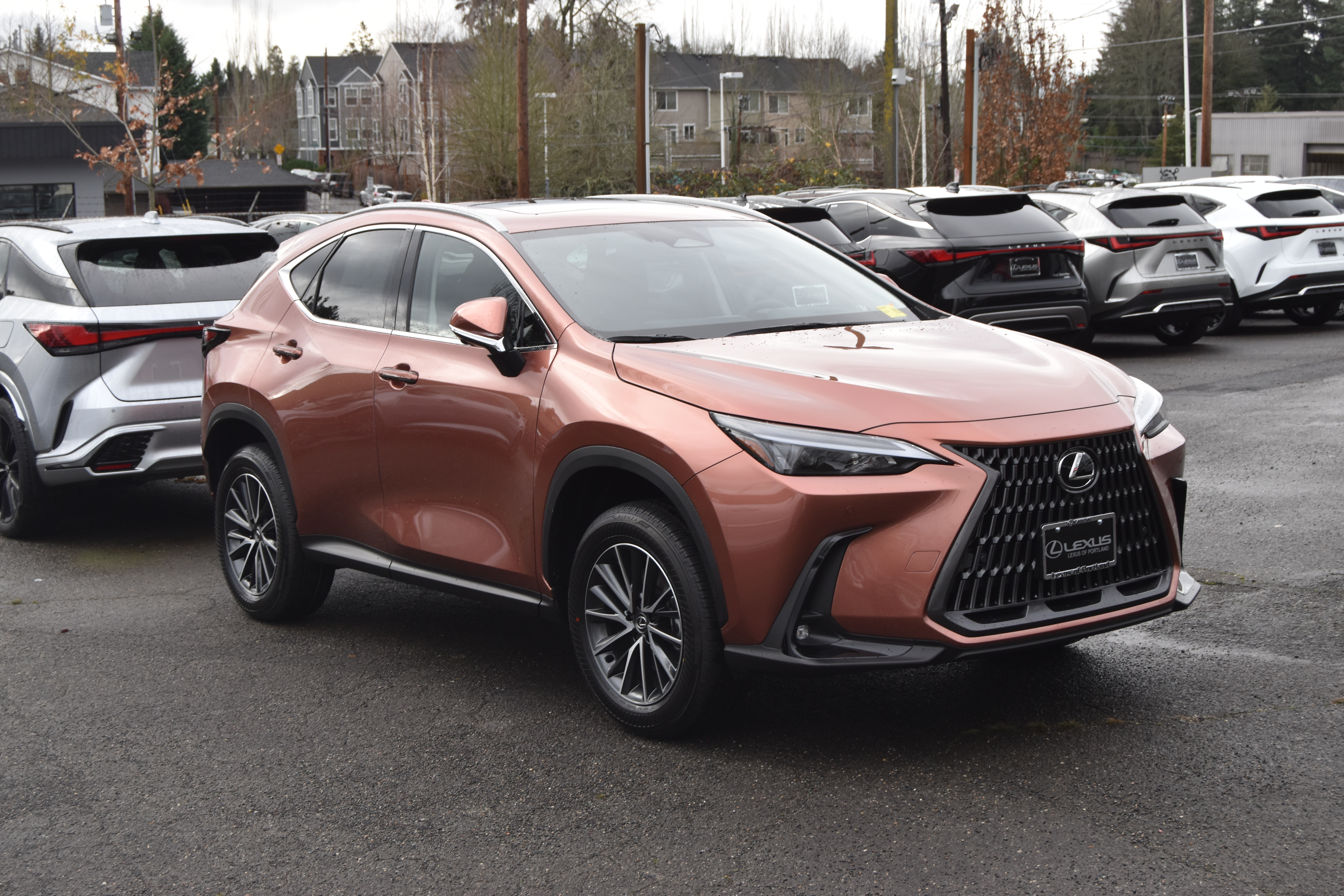
Lexus NX350 in Copper Crest paint (TAZA25, USA)

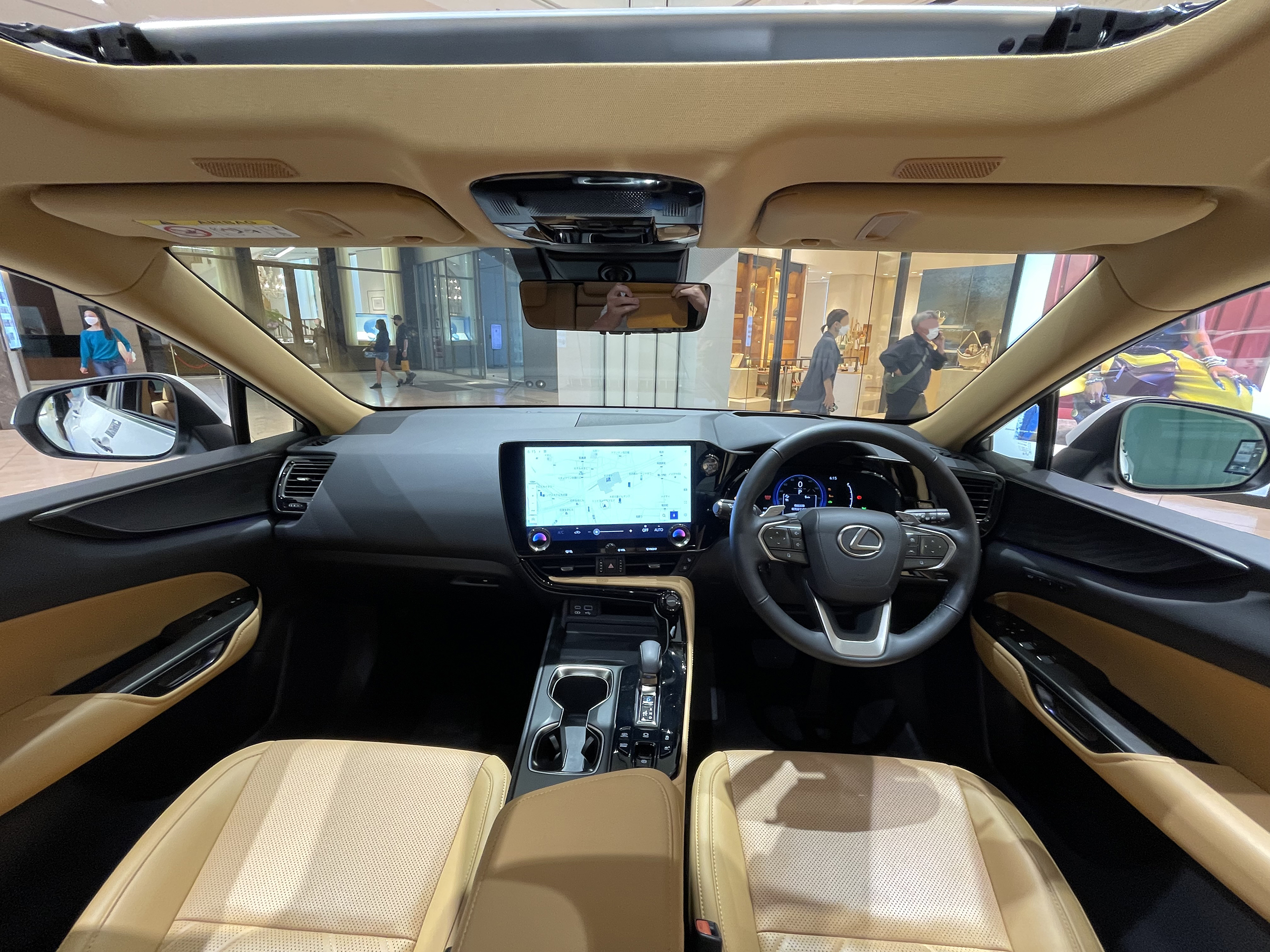
Interior

=== Features ===
At launch, models were equipped with a 9.8-inch screen, whereas higher-end models came equipped with a 14-inch screen. Apple CarPlay and Android Auto are standard and operate via wireless connection. Lexus Climate Concierge, Lexus Connected Services, and the "Hey Lexus" interface are all standard. A head-up display and wireless smartphone charging are both optional. 10-speaker stereo is standard and a 17-speaker Mark Levinson system is available on Luxury and Premium packages. Emergency braking with pedestrian detection, lane-keeping assist, and adaptive cruise control are all standard. The interior design was based on the 'tazuna' concept that was previewed by the LF-30 Electrified concept car. The word tazuna is derived from the “reins” used to control horses.

Remote connectivity features allow the driver to enable and disable features from their smartphone, such as air-conditioning and lighting. The air conditioning system utilises a deodorising and pollen removal clean-air filter. The Lexus Climate Concierge essentially identifies which seats are occupied based on the opening and closing of doors, and ventilates which seats are occupied.

Ambient lighting is available on F Sport and Sports Luxury models for Australia.

In 2023, for the 2024 model year, the NX 350h and NX 450h+ receive remote parking features, while the NX450h+ F Sport is now available with either a regular sunroof or a panoramic sunroof.

=== 2026 facelift ===
On 1 September 2026, a mid-cycle facelift of the NX was unveiled. Changes for the exterior include redesigned front and rear fascias, two-bar stylized LED lights, a more dynamic honeycomb grille, and new paint and alloy wheel options. The interior is also redesigned with elements shared from the eighth-generation ES and TZ, including a 12.3-inch digital instrument cluster and 14-inch central touchscreen display operated by LexusConnect, an updated steering wheel with an engraved Lexus wordmark replacing the logo, and physical "Hidden Tech" switches below the central display.

=== Markets ===
Production for most markets began in December 2021.

==== Australia ====
For Australia, trims include: the NX250 Luxury, NX350h Luxury, NX350h Sports Luxury, NX350h F Sport, NX350 F Sport AWD, and the NX450h+ F Sport. Luxury grades receive a 9.8-inch screen, whereas F Sport and Sports Luxury receive a 14.0-inch.

==== Brazil ====
The NX is exclusively sold as the 350h in Brazil through 3 grades: Luxury, Dynamic and F Sport.

==== Europe ====
The Lexus NX 250 and NX 350 are offered in Russia and some Eastern European countries, while the hybrid models NX 350h and NX 450h+ are available in the UK and Western European countries. Trims in Europe include: Business, Luxury, Executive, and F Sport. Available packages include the Premium, Premium Plus, and Takumi. The Lexus Safety System+ is standard, and F Sport grades receive Adaptive Variable Suspension with lateral performance dampers.

==== Indonesia ====
The NX was launched in March 2022 at the 2022 Gaikindo Jakarta Auto Week. It was offered in three variants; NX 250 Luxury, NX 350h, and NX 450h+. The NX 350h offered in Luxury and F Sport options.

==== Malaysia ====
The NX 250 Luxury and NX 350 F Sport AWD were launched in May 2022 for the Malaysian market. In July 2025, the NX 350h Luxury was added. The NX 350 F Sport stays in the line up, but the NX 250 Luxury was discontinued.

==== Middle East ====
In the Middle East, it is sold as the 350, it is available in three grades, Premier, Prestige and F Sport.

==== Philippines ====
In the Philippines, the NX is exclusively sold as the 350 with 3 grades: 350h Executive, NX 350h Premier, and NX 350h F Sport.

==== South Africa ====
In South Africa, models include the NX 250, NX 350, and the NX 350h. Grades include the SE, EX, and the F Sport.

==== United States ====
Trims in the US include: the NX 250, NX 250 Premium, NX 350, NX 350 Premium, NX 350 Luxury, NX 350 F Sport Handling, NX 350h, NX 350h Premium, NX 350h Luxury, NX 450h+ Luxury, and the NX 450h + F Sport Handling.

=== Powertrain ===
Most of the powertrains are shared with the XA50 series Toyota RAV4. The 2.4-liter T24A-FTS turbocharged four-cylinder engine was introduced for the NX 350, producing 205 kW (275 hp; 279 PS) and 430 N⋅m (317 lb⋅ft) of torque. The NX 450h+ was also introduced as the first plug-in hybrid vehicle in Lexus' lineup and shares the same powertrain as the RAV4 PHV.

Type	Model	Engine code	Displacement	Power	Torque	Combined system output	Electric motor	Battery	Transmission	Model code	Layout	Cal. years
Gasoline	NX 200	M20A-FKS	1,986 cc (2.0 L) I4	127 kW (170 hp; 173 PS) @ 6,600 rpm	206 N⋅m (21.0 kg⋅m; 152 lb⋅ft) @ 4,400–4,900 rpm	-	-	-	"Direct-Shift" CVT	MAZA20	FWD	2021–present
Gasoline	NX 250/260	A25A-FKS	2,487 cc (2.5 L) I4	152 kW (204 hp; 207 PS) @ 6,600 rpm	249 N⋅m (25.4 kg⋅m; 184 lb⋅ft) @ 5,000 rpm	-	-	-	8-speed "Direct Shift" automatic	AAZA20	FWD	2021–2025
Gasoline	NX 250/260	A25A-FKS	2,487 cc (2.5 L) I4	152 kW (204 hp; 207 PS) @ 6,600 rpm	249 N⋅m (25.4 kg⋅m; 184 lb⋅ft) @ 5,000 rpm	-	-	-	8-speed "Direct Shift" automatic	AAZA25	AWD	2021–2025
Gasoline	NX 350	T24A-FTS	2,393 cc (2.4 L) I4 turbocharged	205 kW (275 hp; 279 PS) @ 6,000 rpm	430 N⋅m (43.8 kg⋅m; 317 lb⋅ft) @ 1,700–3,600 rpm	-	-	-	8-speed "Direct Shift" automatic	TAZA25	AWD	2021–present
Gasoline hybrid	NX 350h	A25A-FXS	2,487 cc (2.5 L) I4	Engine: 140 kW (188 hp; 190 PS) @ 6,000 rpm Front motor: 134 kW (180 hp; 182 PS)	Engine: 243 N⋅m (24.8 kg⋅m; 179 lb⋅ft) @ 4,300–4,500 rpm Front motor: 270 N⋅m (27.5 kg⋅m; 199 lb⋅ft)	179 kW (240 hp; 243 PS)	5NM AC synchronous (front)	1.6 kW·h lithium-ion	eCVT	AAZH20	FWD	2021–present
Gasoline hybrid	NX 350h	A25A-FXS	2,487 cc (2.5 L) I4	+ Rear motor: 40 kW (54 hp; 54 PS)	+ Rear motor: 121 N⋅m (12.3 kg⋅m; 89.2 lb⋅ft)	179 kW (240 hp; 243 PS)	+ 4NM AC synchronous (rear)	1.6 kW·h lithium-ion	eCVT	AAZH25	AWD E-Four	2021–present
Gasoline plug-in hybrid	NX 400h+	A25A-FXS	2,487 cc (2.5 L) I4	Engine: 136 kW (182 hp; 185 PS) @ 6,000 rpm Front motor: 134 kW (180 hp; 182 PS)	Engine: 228 N⋅m (23.2 kg⋅m; 168 lb⋅ft) @ 3,600–3,700 rpm Front motor: 270 N⋅m (27.5 kg⋅m; 199 lb⋅ft)	227 kW (304 hp; 309 PS)	5NM AC synchronous (front)	18.1 kW·h lithium-ion	eCVT	AAZH21	FWD	2021–present
Gasoline plug-in hybrid	NX 450h+	A25A-FXS	2,487 cc (2.5 L) I4	+ Rear motor: 40 kW (54 hp; 54 PS)	+ Rear motor: 121 N⋅m (12.3 kg⋅m; 89.2 lb⋅ft)	227 kW (304 hp; 309 PS)	+ 4NM AC synchronous (rear)	18.1 kW·h lithium-ion	eCVT	AAZH26	AWD E-Four	2021–present

=== Safety ===
==== IIHS ====
The 2022 NX was awarded the "Top Safety Pick +" by the Insurance Institute for Highway Safety.

IIHS scores
Small overlap front (Driver)	Good
Small overlap front (Passenger)	Good
Moderate overlap front	Good
Side (original test)	Good
Roof strength	Good
Head restraints and seats	Good
Headlights	Good
Front crash prevention (Vehicle-to-Vehicle)	Superior
Front crash prevention (Vehicle-to-Pedestrian, day)	Superior
Child seat anchors (LATCH) ease of use	Good+

==== Euro NCAP ====
The 2022 Lexus NX scored five stars overall in its Euro NCAP test.

Euro NCAP test results Lexus NX (2022)
Test	Points	%
Overall:	5 /5 stars	
Adult occupant:	34.6	91%
Child occupant:	42.9	87%
Pedestrian:	45.2	83%
Safety assist:	14.7	91%

==== ANCAP ====
ANCAP test results Lexus NX all variants (2022, aligned with Euro NCAP)
Test	Points	%
Overall:	5 /5 stars	
Adult occupant:	35.59	91%
Child occupant:	43.87	89%
Pedestrian:	35.15	83%
Safety assist:	13.75	92%

==== TNCAP ====
TNCAP (1.0) test result Lexus NX 200 'Elite' (2024, similar to Euro NCAP 2017)
Test	Points	%
Overall:	5/5 stars	
Adult occupant:	35.409	93%
Child occupant:	43.277	88%
Pedestrian:	34.871	83%
Safety assist:	8.675	72%

== Sales ==
In its first full year of sales the NX sold over 43,000 units in the US. It was also successful in Europe where it sold over 28,000 in its first full year of sales, of which more than 17,000 were hybrids. This made it Lexus's best selling model in Europe. Its success was also strong in Russia, where in its first full year of sales it was the best selling luxury vehicle.

Calendar year	US sales (hybrid; plug-in hybrid)	Europe sales (hybrid; plug-in hybrid)	China (plug-in hybrid)
2014	2,927 (354)		
2015	43,764 (2,573)	28,417 (17,278)	
2016	54,884 (2,842)	26,105 (17,991)	
2017	59,341 (3,323)	27,789 (19,747)	
2018	62,079 (9,062)	29,508 (20,644)	
2019	58,715 (9,638)	24,309 (17,391)	
2020	55,784 (9,358)	18,650 (12,754)	
2021	58,514 (10,614; 18)	19,493 (14,255)	
2022	49,002 (13,873; 3,507)	17,504 (8,424; 7,749)	
2023	74,526 (21,435; 5,265)	25,709 (13,121; 11,629)	23,374 (2,469)
2024	74,488 (27,129; 6,301)	26,635 (16,841; 9,182)	20,175 (376)
2025	76,836 (30,203; 7,008)		18,342 (549)
