= Textile industry in Taiwan =

The textile industry in Taiwan is a major component of the economy of Taiwan.

== History ==
In 1949, Taiwan had 10,000 cotton spindles. In 1954, the Ministry of Economic Affairs established a committee to establish plans for textile industry. The Taiwan Textile Research Institute (TTRI), a government research institute, was founded in 1959. In 1964, the industry grew to 500,000 cotton spindles, making the cotton textiles industry the fastest growing industry in Taiwan at that time. Decades later with the growing petrochemical industry, man-made fiber dominated the field. After the normalization of relations with the People’s Republic of China much of Taiwan’s textile industry either shifted production or went out of business. According to TTRI data in 1997 there were 7,752 textile companies in Taiwan, but by 2010 there were only 4,299.

In the 21st century Taiwan’s textile industry shifted towards technical textiles, a global market which Taiwan had captured 70% of by 2018.

== Economy ==
As of 1965, the industry paid a total tax of NT$240 million to the government. In 2015, the total value of textile production in Taiwan was NT$409.3 billion.

The export value of textile industries was US$44 million in 1963 in which 80% of it was cottons. Major exporting countries or regions were British Hong Kong, Iran, Latin America, South Korea, South Vietnam, Thailand, United Kingdom, United States. In 2015, textile exports amounted NT$10.8 billion and imports amounted NT$3.46 billion. In 2014, Taiwan was the 7th largest exporting countries for clothing products. Major importing countries or regions were Indonesia, Japan, United States and Vietnam. In 2019, Taiwan became the fourth largest surplus industry.

== Factories ==
In 1965, Taiwan had 24 cotton textile mills. The numbers then grew to 4,300 in 2015. In 2019, there were roughly around 4,255 textile factories.

== Production ==
Around 75% of domestic yarn production is used for clothing.

== Workforce ==
The textile industry employed around 35,000 people in 1965 and in 2015 it employed 140,000 people.

== Research and development ==
The Taiwan Textile Research Institute is the government-funded research institute in Taiwan in textile industry.

== See also ==
- Fashion in Taiwan
- Eclat Textile
- Far Eastern New Century
