= Far Eastern New Century =

- Native name: 遠東新世紀
- Formerly: Far Eastern Knitting Factory Co., Ltd. Far Eastern Knitting Co., Ltd. Far Eastern Textile Ltd.
- Company type: Conglomerate
- Predecessor: Far Eastern Knitting Co., Ltd., Taiwan Far Eastern Textile Co., Ltd.
- Founded: 1942; 84 years ago in Shanghai
- Headquarters: Taipei, Taiwan
- Website: www.fenc.com

Far Eastern New Century (FENC; Chinese: 遠東新世紀; pinyin: Yuǎndōng Xīn Shìjì), formerly known as Far Eastern Textile Limited (FETL; Chinese: 遠東紡織股份有限公司), is a Taiwanese conglomerate. Its main activity is the production and finishing of synthetic fibres and other textiles. It has factories in China, Taiwan and Southeast Asia.

In 2007 it was listed in the Forbes Global 2000 largest companies in the world, at #1560.

== See also ==
- List of companies of Taiwan
- Eclat Textile
- Textile industry in Taiwan
