= Industrial Technology Research Institute =

Taiwanese R&D organization

Industrial Technology Research Institute 工業技術硏究院
- Type: Not-for-profit research institute
- Industry: Research and development
- Founded: 5 July 1973
- Headquarters: Zhudong Township, Hsinchu County, Taiwan
- Key people: Wu Tsung-tsong (Chairman); Chang Pei-zen (President)
- Number of employees: 6500+
- Website: www.itri.org/eng

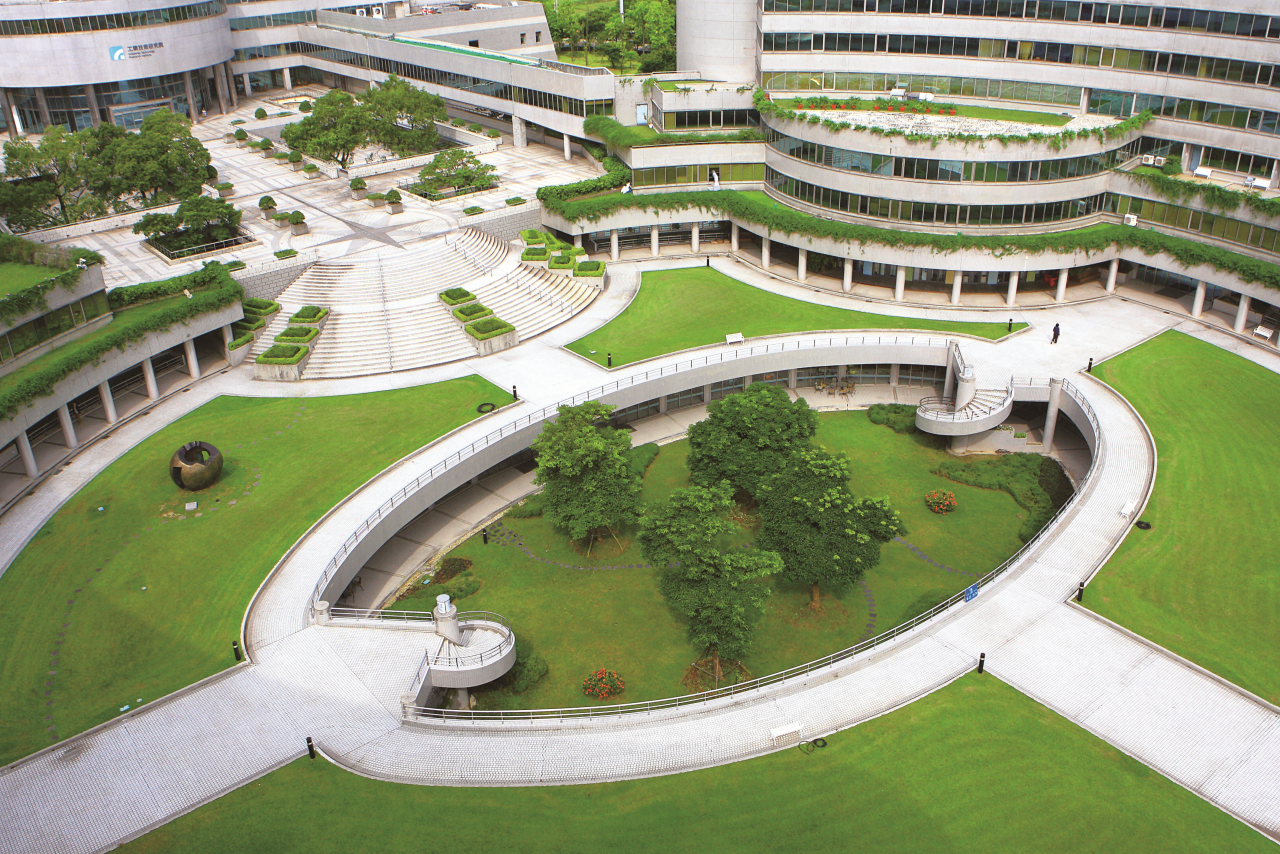
ITRI Headquarters main plaza

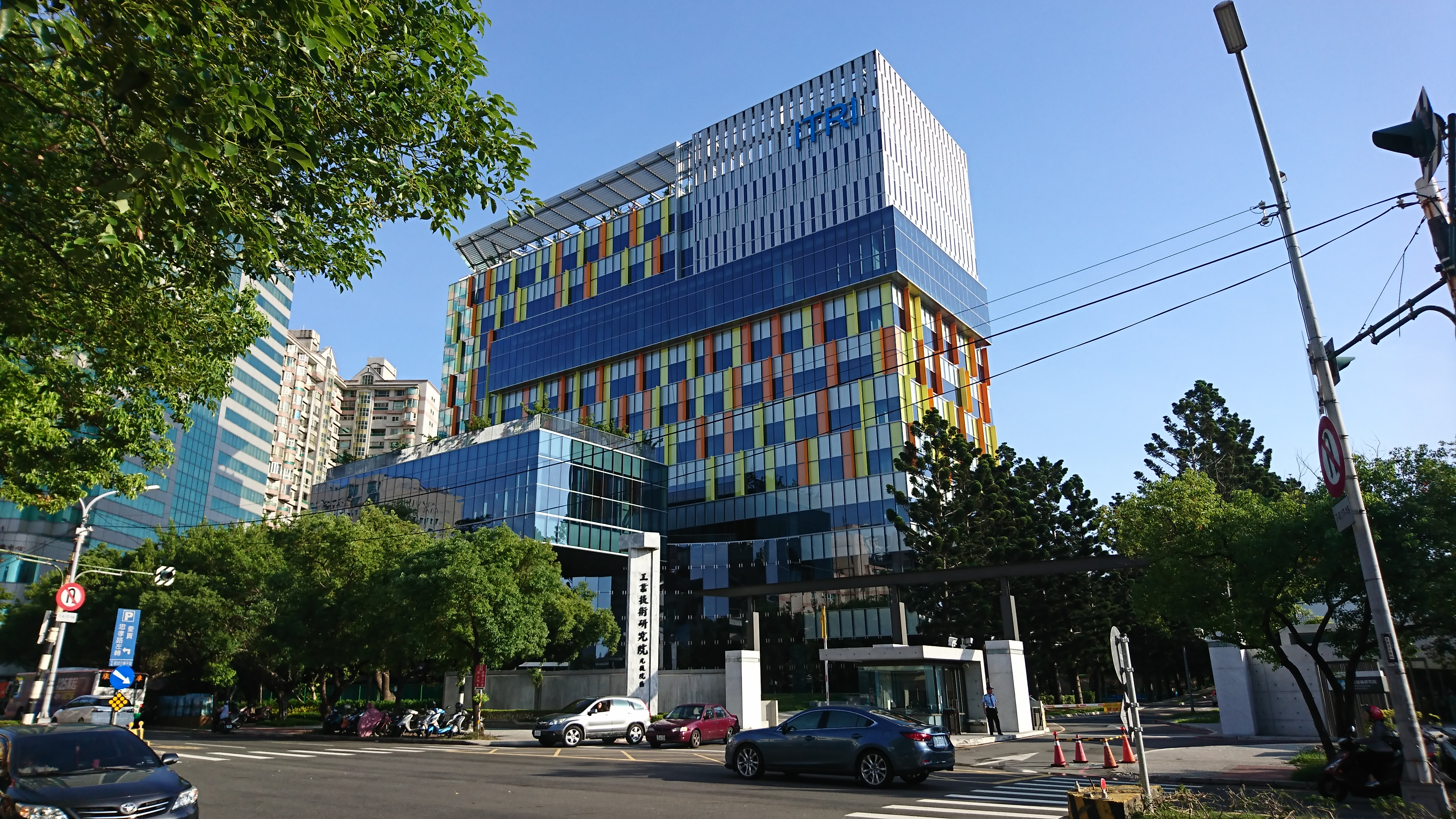
ITRI's Guang Fu Campus in Hsinchu

The Industrial Technology Research Institute (ITRI; Chinese: 工業技術研究院; pinyin: Gōngyè Jìshù Yánjiù Yuàn) is an applied technology research organization headquartered in Hsinchu County, Taiwan, with international branch offices in the US, the UK, Germany, Japan, and Thailand. Founded in 1973 with government support, ITRI was established to strengthen R&D capabilities in Taiwan's industrial sector.

The Institute contributed to Taiwan's transition from a labor-intensive manufacturing to an innovation-driven economy. It has facilitated the establishment of several major technology firms through technology transfer and incubation, including United Microelectronics Corporation (UMC), Taiwan Semiconductor Manufacturing Company (TSMC), and EpiStar.

== History ==
=== Origins ===
In the early 1970s, the Taiwan government sought to restructure the island's economy following a series of political and economic setbacks, including the global oil crisis and Taiwan's withdrawal from the United Nations. ITRI was established in 1973 to consolidate industrial research under the Ministry of Economic Affairs. In 1974, then Minister of Economic Affairs Yun-Suan Sun, Director General of Transportation and Communications Yu-Shu Kao, ITRI President Chao-Chen Wang, Telecommunication Laboratories Director Bao-Huang Kang, Executive Yuan Secretary-General Hua Fei, Director General of Telecommunications Hsien-Chi Fang, and Radio Corporation of America (RCA) Laboratories Director Wen-Yuan Pan held a meeting to discuss Taiwan's semiconductor industry. Following the meeting, ITRI launched an initiative for integrated circuit (IC) development. This led to a technology transfer agreement with the U.S.-based Radio Corporation of America (RCA) in 1976, which officially introduced semiconductor technology to Taiwan. ITRI then constructed Taiwan's first 3-inch wafer fab, which served as the training ground for the nation's semiconductor talent.

=== 1980s and 1990s ===
In 1981, United Microelectronics Corporation (UMC) was spun off from ITRI's IC plant as Taiwan's first professional wafer manufacturer.

In 1986, Li Kwoh-ting, representing the Executive Yuan, invited Morris Chang to serve as the president of the ITRI and offered him a blank check to build Taiwan's chip industry. At that time, the Taiwanese government wanted to develop its semiconductor industry, but its high investment and high risk nature made it difficult to find investors. Chang was turned down by Texas Instruments and Intel before Philips signed a joint venture contract with Taiwan to put up $58 million, transfer its production technology, and license intellectual property in exchange for a 27.6 percent stake in TSMC. In 1987, ITRI spun off Taiwan Semiconductor Manufacturing Company (TSMC), which eventually became the world's largest dedicated semiconductor foundry.

During the 1980s, ITRI supported R&D in CNC machine tools, displays, and laptops. In 1985, ITRI partnered with Giant Manufacturing to develop carbon-fiber bicycle frames, helping Taiwan become a leading global supplier of high-end bicycles. In the 1990s, ITRI focused on optical discs, LEDs, optoelectronic components, and energy technologies. In 1990, ITRI and 46 local computer manufacturers formed the Taiwan Notebook PC Consortium, marking the beginning of Taiwan's laptop development.

=== 2000s to present ===
In the 2000s, ITRI developed new materials and energy applications such as solid-state capacitors and solar cells. In the 2010s, it advanced digital and green technologies such as cloud computing, big data, AI, IoT, and lithium battery applications. In the 2020s, the Institute has focused on R&D innovation in hydrogen energy, 5G, and smart healthcare to address the challenges in net zero transition and an aging society.

In 2019, ITRI banned all smartphones and computers made by China's Huawei from their internal network for security reasons. China's Taiwan Affairs Office reacted negatively to the decision with their spokesperson saying that the decision "jeopardizes the mainland and Taiwan's regular economic cooperation for political purposes".

In summer 2025 ITRI ceased its involvement in the Taiwan Space Agency's 5G LEO communications satellite project saying that they had realized that satellites were outside of their area of expertise. ITRI was replaced by private firms.

== Research Areas ==
ITRI aligns its R&D focuses with national industrial policies and global technological trends.

ITRI's semiconductor research focuses on advanced technologies, including 3D IC heterogeneous integration, fan-out panel-level packaging (FOPLP), and silicon photonics for next-generation computing. ITRI provides pilot production and design validation for semiconductor devices. In 2024, ITRI collaborated with TSMC to develop a spin-orbit-torque magnetic random-access memory (SOT-MRAM) array chip.

ITRI has developed artificial intelligence applications, including machine learning models, edge computing platforms, and AI chip design, and promoted their use in smart manufacturing, cybersecurity, and speech and image recognition.

ITRI mechanical engineering research supports R&D of autonomous driving, electric vehicles (EVs), and unmanned aerial vehicles (UAVs). ITRI unveiled Taiwan's first self-driving mini bus in 2018. In 2025, ITRI's drone team won the Harsh Environment Drone Challenge at the World Robot Summit.

ITRI biomedicine research focuses on smart medical technology and precision medicine, with research emphasis on regenerative medicine, sensing technologies, and AI applications. The Institute has formed industry alliances and developed smart solutions for elderly long-term care. In 2020, ITRI established the Taiwan Integrated Biomedical Industrial Center (TIBIC), a cross-domain platform providing verification and clinical simulation services to support medical and healthcare innovation.

ITRI operates the Shalun Green Technology Demonstration Site in Tainan, a national hub for developing, testing, and showcasing advanced green energy tech, featuring sustainable buildings, smart energy management, hydrogen production, and energy storage applications. In 2019, ITRI established the world's first Subtropical Performance Testbed for Innovative Energy Research in Buildings (SPIN Lab).

Since the 2000s, ITRI has integrated nanotech and green processes to develop smart textiles and recyclable composite fibers. It has also advanced new material technologies for solid-state batteries and biomedical devices.

== Awards ==
- Top 100 Global Innovators: Named to Clarivate's list for the tenth time as of 2026.
- R&D 100 Awards: Has won 72 awards over 19 consecutive years (2008–2026).
- Edison Awards: Has won 28 awards since 2017.

== See also ==
- Taiwan Textile Research Institute
- Taiwan Design Research Institute
- Automotive Research & Testing Center
- National Chung-Shan Institute of Science and Technology
- National Institutes of Applied Research
- Institute for Information Industry
- Tsinghua Big Five Alliance
- Pecola (robot)
