= Eclat Textile =

Taiwanese textile company

Eclat Textile Co. Ltd.
- Native name: 儒鴻企業股份有限公司
- Founded: 1977; 49 years ago
- Founder: C. H. Hung
- Headquarters: No. 738, Zhongyang Rd, Xinzhuang District, New Taipei, Taiwan
- Revenue: USD 991 million (2023)
- Number of employees: 16,000+
- Website: www.eclat.com.tw

Eclat Textile (Chinese: 儒鴻企業股份有限公司), is a Taiwanese textile company. Its main activity is the production and finishing of synthetic fibres and other textiles. The headquarters of the company is located in Xinzhuang District, New Taipei, Taiwan. It is the supplier of the Lululemon Athletica's Luon fabric. A supplier to major global brands including Nike, Gap, Lululemon Athletica, and Under Armour, operates fabric production facilities in Taiwan and Vietnam, alongside garment manufacturing plants in Vietnam, Cambodia, Lesotho, and Indonesia. In 2001, it was listed in the Taiwan Stock Exchange.

== See also ==
- List of companies of Taiwan
- Fashion in Taiwan
- Far Eastern New Century
- Textile industry in Taiwan
