= Automotive Research & Testing Center =

Taiwanese research facility

Automotive Research & Testing Center 車輛研究測試中心
- Type: Research institute
- Industry: Automotive, Research
- Founded: 1990
- Headquarters: Lukang, Changhua County, Taiwan
- Website: www.artc.org.tw

The Automotive Research & Testing Center (ARTC; Chinese: 車輛研究測試中心) is a government funded non-profit automotive research facility located in Lukang Township, Changhua County, Taiwan.

== History ==
ARTC was founded in 1990 under the auspices of the Ministry of Economic Affairs.

ARTC is one of the founding members of Taiwan Automotive Research Consortium (TARC) which was established in mid-2005.

== Facilities ==
ARTC's main testing facility in Changhua has twelve different test tracks on 119 hectares of land.

On 26 August 2022, the TNCAP Testing Facility was inaugurated. It is used for testing vehicles for the Taiwan New Car Assessment Program (TNCAP).

== Research ==
Among Taiwanese research institutes ARTC takes the lead on automotive intelligence, especially the development of electronics systems. In 2015 a team conducted research at ARTC on the augmentation of GNSS with laser ranging. ARTC is involved with the development of an autonomous light bus which was unveiled in September 2019. Named Winbus the platform performs at SAE Level 4 – High automation.

The Winbus can carry 15 passengers at a maximum speed of 50 km/h (31 mph) for at least 70 km (43 mi) on one charge. In July 2020 a trial service began in Changhua, Taiwan, connecting four tourism factories in Changhua Coastal Industrial Park along a 7.5 km (4.7 mi), with plans to extend the route to 12.6 km (7.8 mi) to serve tourist destinations.

== See also ==
- Automotive industry in Taiwan
- Transportation Research Center
- Pan Asia Technical Automotive Center
- United States Army CCDC Ground Vehicle Systems Center
- International Centre for Automotive Technology
- Taiwan Textile Research Institute
- Industrial Technology Research Institute
