= Institute for Information Industry =

Taiwanese non-governmental organization

- Native name: 資訊工業策進會
- Company type: NGO research institute
- Industry: R&D
- Founded: July 24, 1979; 46 years ago
- Headquarters: 11F, No. 106, Section 2, Heping East Road, Taipei City, Taiwan
- Key people: Dr. Chih-Kung Lee, Chairman; Dr. CH Cho, President
- Services: ICT R&D, Telematics R&D, ICT Talents Cultivation, Market Intelligence Analysis, Science & Technology Law Research & Service, ICT Applied Innovative Service, ICT Application Promotion, Innovated Start-Ups Incubation, International Collaboration Development
- Website: web.iii.org.tw

The Institute for Information Industry (III; Chinese: 資訊工業策進會; pinyin: Zīxùn Gōngyè Cèjìnhuì, abbreviated Chinese: 資策會; pinyin: Zīcèhuì) was established in 1979 as a non-governmental organization (NGO) to support the communication sector in Taiwan under the supervision of the Ministry of Economic Affairs. It has international partnerships with InBIA, IEEE and Cisco Networking Academy.

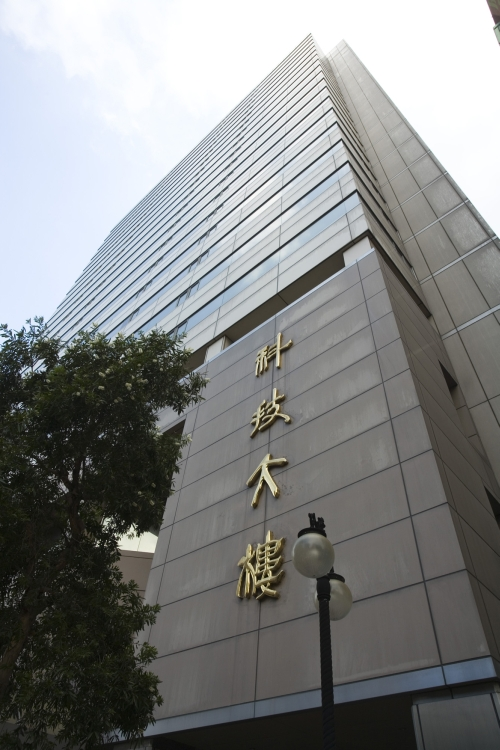
III’s headquarter

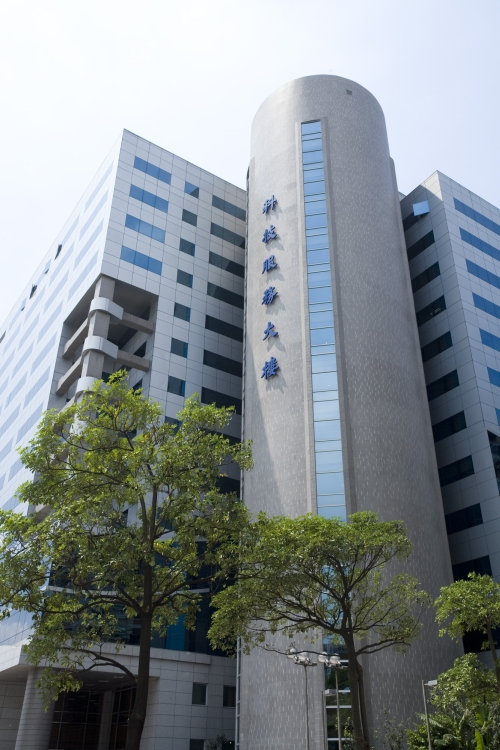
III’s major branch offices

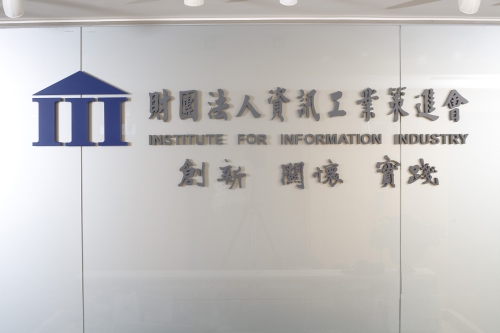
III’s three core values: Innovation, Compassion, Effectiveness

== Organization ==
III is supervised by a Board of Directors and led by the President/CEO. The organization is composed of 3 functional groups: R&D Institutes, Service Units and Operational Supports.

== Core Competences ==
=== Research and Development ===
- Network and Multimedia
- ITeS
- Digital Education
- Green ICT

=== Industry Services ===
- Industry Think Tank
- Science and Technology Law
- Industry Incubation

=== Intellectual Property ===
- Technology Transfer
- Patents

== Locations ==
=== Headquarters ===
III’s headquarters occupies the 8th to 11th floors of the Science and Technology Building.

=== Branch Offices ===
- 5F, 7F, 8F, 14F, No. 133, Sec. 4 Minsheng East Road, Taipei City 105, Taiwan, R.O.C.
- 8F, No.151, Sec. 3, Xinyi Road, Taipei City 106, Taiwan, R.O.C.
- 19F, 22F, No. 216, Sec. 2, Dunhua South Road, Taipei 106, Taiwan, R.O.C.
- 3F-3, No. 2, Fuxing 4th Road, Kaohsiung City, 80661 Taiwan, R.O.C. (Kaohsiung Software Technology Park)
- No.2, Wenxian Rd., Nantou City, Nantou County 540, Taiwan (R.O.C.)

== Leadership ==
- Chairman
  - 2009–2012: Chintay Shih
  - 2012–2016: Jin-Fu Chang
  - 2016.5-2016.8: Ta-Sheng Lo (Acting chairman)
  - 2016.8-2017.9: Yau-Hwang Kuo
  - 2017.10-present: Dr. Chih-Kung Lee
- President
  - 2010–2012: Chih-Kung Lee
  - 2012–2016: Ruey-Beei Wu
  - 2016.5-2016.8: Jonq-Min Liu (Acting president)
  - 2016.8-2017.10: Jonq-Min Liu
  - 2017.11-2018.10: Hsiao-Pin Yu (Yuster)
  - 2018.10-2019.1: Po Jen Hsiao (Acting president)
  - 2019.1-present: CH Cho
