= Glenn Craig =

Canadian Fundraising Professional

Glenn Craig, CFRE
- Occupations: President & CEO, Thunder Bay Regional Health Sciences Foundation
- Years active: April 1, 2008; 18 years ago
- Known for: Launched the Thunder Bay 50/50 Draw in January 2021, which is believed to be the most successful hospital cash draw in Canada.

Glenn Craig, CFRE is a Canadian fundraising professional and the President and CEO of the Thunder Bay Regional Health Sciences Foundation in Thunder Bay, Ontario. He is notable for launching the Thunder Bay 50/50 Draw, which according to the Ottawa Citizen may be the most successful hospital cash draw in Canada. Leaders from other hospital charities in Canada recognized Craig’s contributions to healthcare fundraising for managing to “crack the 50/50 formula” as one person described it. Launched in January 2021 as a COVID pivot, the Thunder Bay 50/50 awarded over $109 million in prizes as of August 2026 to winners across Ontario. The Thunder Bay 50/50 helps raise funds for equipment and programming at the Thunder Bay Regional Health Sciences Centre.

Craig personally calls the Grand Prize winner from his office or the Thunder Bay 50/50 Store at Intercity Shopping Centre after the draw at 11am Eastern Time on the last Friday of every month. The Health Sciences Foundation records the often emotional phone calls and posts them on social media including the organization’s YouTube Channel.

== Career ==
Craig started his fundraising career in August 1991 in Thunder Bay, Ontario when he joined the now-closed McKellar Hospital Foundation and its fundraising team. After several leadership roles in philanthropy, he became President and CEO of the Northern Cancer Research Foundation (NCRF) in Thunder Bay in 1998. He oversaw amalgamation of the NCRF with the Thunder Bay Regional Health Sciences Foundation in 2008, and continued on as its President and CEO.

In 1996, Craig became one of the early Canadian fundraising professionals to earn a Certified Fund Raising Executive (CRFE) designation.
