= Thunder Bay Transit =

Public transit operator in Thunder Bay, Ontario, Canada

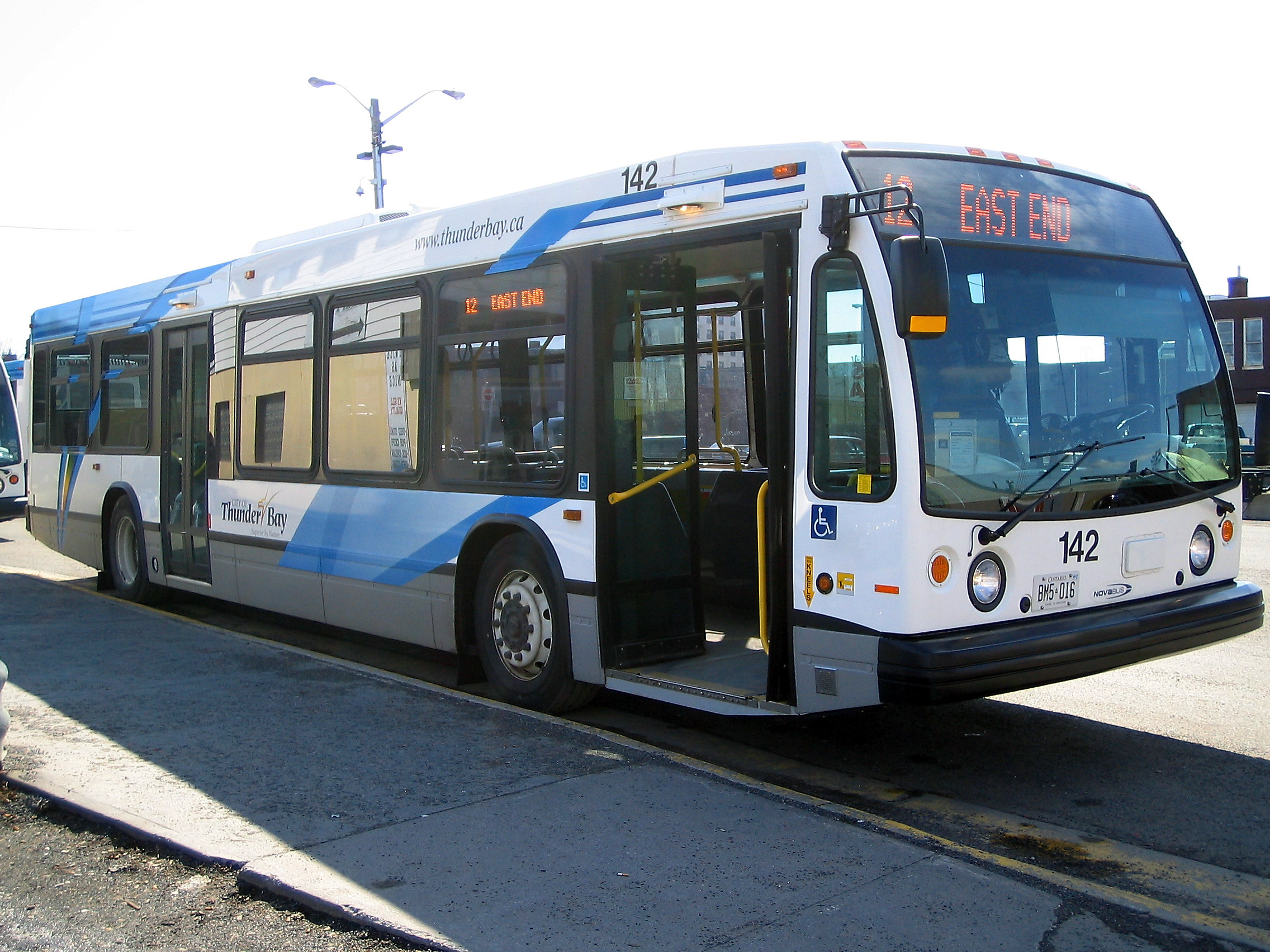
- Thunder Bay Transit bus at Brodie St Terminal (now replaced by City Hall Terminal).
- Founded: 1970 (1892 as Port Arthur Street Railway)
- Headquarters: 570 Fort William Road; Thunder Bay, Ontario, Canada
- Locale: Thunder Bay Urban Area; Fort William First Nation
- Service area: 256 km^{2} (99 sq mi)
- Service type: Local bus service
- Alliance: CUTA
- Routes: 20
- Hubs: 5 (2 Terminals, 3 Major Transfer Points)
- Fleet: 49 low-floor models
- Daily ridership: 9,000
- Fuel type: Diesel - 46; Biodiesel - 3
- Operator: City of Thunder Bay - Transportation and Works Department
- Manager: Brad Loroff
- Website: www.thunderbay.ca/city-services/transit/
Route Map

Thunder Bay Transit is the public transit operator in Thunder Bay, Ontario, Canada. It was formed in 1970, after the amalgamation of the cities of Port Arthur and Fort William and their respective transit agencies. Thunder Bay Transit is a member of the Canadian Urban Transit Association.

Thunder Bay Transit operates 20 transit routes in the urban area of Thunder Bay and neighbouring Fort William First Nation, an area of 256 km^{2} (99 sq mi). Its fleet of 49 buses run on diesel and biodiesel fuels. Thunder Bay Transit carries 3,300,000 passengers annually, or approximately 9,000 passengers daily, and employs 140 people. The company maintains two transit terminals, one at 40 North Water Street in Port Arthur, and the other at City Hall at 500 Donald Street East in Fort William.

Thunder Bay Transit is the first transit agency in Ontario to be 100% handicapped accessible, and the first Canadian transit agency to use the NextBus system with passenger counters, fare box integrations and passenger information systems.

== History ==
Public transit in Thunder Bay was first established in 1892. Compounding the matter was the Canadian Pacific Railway's decision to build its grain elevators and rail yards in neighbouring Fort William, 6 km (4 mi) away. With businesses and population vanishing, Port Arthur decided after much debate to build a streetcar line to connect the town with the rail yards in neighbouring Fort William, much to that town's chagrin.

=== 1892–1940s: Streetcars ===
In 1891, the town of Port Arthur was authorized to construct and operate the first municipally owned street railway in Canada. The Port Arthur Street Railway (PASRy) commenced operations in March 1892, only serving Port Arthur at the time.

Meanwhile, Fort William wanted nothing to do with Port Arthur's municipal railway. Instead, McDonald and Company commenced operations of a private omnibus, connecting the Port Arthur Street Railway's southern terminus at Fort William's northern town limits into the downtown core of Fort William.

Throughout 1893, however, Port Arthur's streetcar line expanded into Fort William. On June 1 of that year, service was extended to Pruden Street, which was the northernmost point of Fort William at the time. By the end September, the route extended all the way to Westfort, a community that supported Port Arthur's initiative to build a streetcar line. This original streetcar line, primarily on Fort William Road, resembles today's #1 Mainline bus route.

In 1907, Port Arthur and Fort William became cities. The Ontario Railway and Municipal Board forced Port Arthur to sell its section of the railway in Fort William to that city on March 11, 1908, and to submit to operation by a joint commission until December 1, 1913, under the name Port Arthur and Fort William Railway. Thereafter, each city ran its own street railway—Port Arthur assumed the name Port Arthur Civic Railway in 1914, and Fort William assumed the name Fort William Street Railway.

The early 20th century saw expansion along the PASRy's system. A line was built on Arthur Street (since renamed to Red River Road, and not to be confused with present-day Arthur Street) to Hill Street in 1909. Port Arthur also added two belt lines in 1913, the North Belt Line and the South Belt Line. The first streetcars ran on the North Belt Line on October 29, 1913. In addition, the main line was extended into Current River (Hodder Ave) in 1913. These expansions would be the origin of today's north side routes, particularly 3C, 3J, 7, 11, 13, and 17. A streetcar barn was also built on Front Street in 1910.

Street railway operations ended in Thunder Bay in 1948. Port Arthur's last three antiquated cars made their final run over the North Belt Line on February 16, 1948, in a driving snowstorm, and Fort William's street cars ceased operations on October 16, 1948. The decision to replace streetcar services with trolley buses were influenced by several factors. Firstly, given the end of the Second World War, vehicle factories no longer had much work. Manufacturing buses would create more jobs. Also, streetcar infrastructure was difficult to maintain, with parts becoming scarce and tracks difficult to maintain. Finally, trolley buses provided more comfort and flexibility.

=== 1940s–1970: Trolleybuses and pre-amalgamation period ===
The Port Arthur Public Utilities Commission which ran the street railway acquired its first 36-passenger bus (painted maroon and cream) in August 1946 manufactured at the Canadian Car and Foundry plant in Fort William. It immediately phased out the Arthur Street railway line, and renamed its system as Port Arthur Transit.. Gasoline-powered buses were introduced in December 1946 to serve the intercity route. Electric trolley buses were introduced on December 15, 1947, the same year that the Fort William Street Railway was renamed the Fort William Transit Company. The trolley buses were manufactured by J. G. Brill and Company at the Canadian Car and Foundry plant in Fort William.

The Intercity trolley coach line (main lines) of each city's system opened in 1947 and was interlined, with operators' coaches serving the entire line in both cities until 1955. From 1955 to September 1969, the route was split between the two cities. One would have to transfer buses at a loop east of the Canadian Lakehead Exhibition grounds, at the Fort William city limits. From 1 October 1969, a full Mainline service was restored in preparation for amalgamation.

Since January 1, 1970, when Port Arthur and Fort William were amalgamated into the City of Thunder Bay, the system has been known as Thunder Bay Transit. Along with a reunified Mainline route, a second major route which traverses the city was created in June 1970: the Crosstown. The Crosstown route connects Westfort and downtown Port Arthur, allowing riders to enjoy a shorter ride between the city's distant ends (saving 15 minutes). In addition, the fare system was modified in January 1970 to allow travel citywide under only one fare.

Electric trolley buses were discontinued on September 10, 1972, and the city has since used diesel buses.

=== 1970–present: Thunder Bay Transit ===
Map of Thunder Bay Transit routes in 2025.

Thunder Bay Transit purchased its first low-floor buses in 1994, and by March 2007 became the first full-sized transit agency in Ontario to have a fleet that consisted entirely of accessible buses. Later that year, Thunder Bay Transit became the second Canadian transit agency to implement Grey Island Systems GPS/AVL and NextBus system with passenger counters, fare box integrations and passenger information systems.

== Fares ==
Thunder Bay Transit fares were last increased on 1 April 2024. Exact cash fare on Thunder Bay Transit is $3.25, support persons ride free, as do children under the age of twelve. Bus tickets can be purchased in groups of 10 for $28.00. Twenty ride punch passes have been discontinued. They have introduced a day pass, which costs $9.00. Tickets are transferable. A transfer pass can be obtained when boarding with cash or tickets, and allows passengers to change buses up to two times for the price of one fare. Transfer passes have a 90-minute time limit and are non-transferable; they can be used only by the person to whom they are issued.

Thunder Bay Transit offers monthly, semester and family/group passes. These passes allow unlimited rides within the time period specified on the face of the card, so that pass holders do not need to use transfers to change buses.

As of 1 April 2024, adult monthly passes cost $87.00, and discount monthly passes are $72.00, which can be purchased by those with a valid discount card, issued only by Thunder Bay Transit. Monthly passes for youth between 13 and 24, and seniors over 60 cost $60.00. Annual senior pass cost is $536.00. On Sundays the adult monthly pass also doubles as a family pass. It allows for unlimited trips for two adults and three children, one adult and four children, or two adults. Proof of age is required, and children must be under the age of 18.

Students at Lakehead University and Confederation College receive a U-Pass as part of their tuition, which allows for unlimited trips during the school year for the person to whom the pass is issued.

== Routes ==
Thunder Bay Transit operates 20 regular transit routes covering approximately 350 km (220 mi) of city streets. Below, is a table of all the routes. Each route has two rows - the top for peak service and lower for off peak. Limited routes will show if they do not provide peak/off-peak service. As of August 2025, the routes are:

Route		Direction & destination				Interlining	Service & frequency
1	Mainline	NB	To Waterfront Terminal	SB	To City Hall Terminal	—N/a	30 min
1	Mainline	NB	To Waterfront Terminal	SB	To City Hall Terminal	Waterfront: 17; 1 (Extra Sunday runs) City Hall: 18; 1 (Extra Sunday runs)	23 min (Sunday daytime) 45 min (other off-peak times)
2	Crosstown	NB	To Waterfront Terminal	SB	To Confederation College	College: 5	30 min
2	Crosstown	NB	To Waterfront Terminal	SB	To Confederation College	College: 5; 16 (Extra weekday evening runs)	23 min (weekdays until 10:30 excluding summer) 45 min (other off-peak times)
3C	County Park	EB	To Waterfront Terminal	WB	To Castlegreen Drive	Waterfront: 3M	30 min
3C	County Park	EB	To Waterfront Terminal	WB	To Castlegreen Drive	Waterfront: 3M	45 min
3J	Jumbo Gardens	EB	To Waterfront Terminal	WB	To Sherwood Drive	Waterfront: 3M	30 min
3J	Jumbo Gardens	No off-peak service. Coverage by routes 3C and 13.					
3M	Memorial	NB	To Waterfront Terminal	SB	To City Hall Terminal	Waterfront: 3C 3J City Hall: 10 18	15 min
3M	Memorial	NB	To Waterfront Terminal	SB	To City Hall Terminal	Waterfront: 3C 3M (Extra runs) City Hall: 10 3M (Extra runs)	23 min (early evening, Saturday morning, and Sunday daytime) 45 min (late evening)
4	Neebing	Clockwise		Loop connecting from Frederica & Brown (Westfort) to 25th Sideroad		Westfort: 6	Weekday peak only
4	Neebing	No off-peak service.					
5	Edward	NB	To Confederation College	SB	To Frederica & Brown (Westfort)	College: 2	30 min
5	Edward	NB	To Confederation College	SB	To Frederica & Brown (Westfort)	College: 2	45 min
6	Mission	NB	To Frederica & Brown	SB	To Fort William First Nation	Westfort: 4	Weekday peak only
6	Mission	No off-peak service.					
7	Hudson	NB	To Shuniah Street	SB	To Waterfront Terminal	Waterfront: 11	30 min
7	Hudson	NB	To Shuniah Street	SB	To Waterfront Terminal	Waterfront: 13	45 min
8	James	NB	To Intercity Shopping Ctr	SB	To City Hall Terminal	—N/a	30 min
8	James	NB	To Confederation College	SB	To City Hall Terminal	City Hall: 14	45 min
9	Junot	NB	To Waterfront Terminal	SB	To Lakehead University	Waterfront: 17 University: 15	30 min
9	Junot	NB	To Waterfront Terminal	SB	To Lakehead University	University: 15	45 min
10	Northwood	EB	To City Hall Terminal	WB	To Confederation College	City Hall: 3M	30 min
10	Northwood	EB	To City Hall Terminal	WB	To Confederation College	City Hall: 3M	45 min
11	John	EB	To Waterfront Terminal	WB	To Windsor Street	Waterfront: 7	Peak only 30 min
11	John	No off-peak service. Coverage by route 13.					
12	East End	NB	To Intercity Shopping Ctr (On Diversion. Continues beyond Intercity to Main Street then the East End neighbourhood before returning)	SB	To City Hall Terminal (On Diversion. Commences at Dease Street)	City Hall: 16	Peak only 30 min
12	East End	No off-peak service.					
13	John-Jumbo	No peak service. Coverage by routes 11 and 3J.					
13	John-Jumbo	EB	To Waterfront Terminal	WB	To County Fair	Waterfront: 7	Off-peak only 45 min
14	Arthur	EB	To City Hall Terminal	WB	To Thunder Bay Airport	City Hall: 8	30 min
14	Arthur	EB	To City Hall Terminal	WB	To Thunder Bay Airport	City Hall: 8	45 min
15	Beverly	NB	To Lakehead University	SB	To Intercity Shopping Centre	University: 9	30 min
15	Beverly	NB	To Lakehead University	SB	To Intercity Shopping Centre	University: 9	45 min
16	Balmoral	EB	From City Hall Terminal (On Diversion. Terminates at Dease Street)	WB	To Confederation College	City Hall/ Dease Street Diversion: 12	30 min
16	Balmoral	EB	To City Hall Terminal	WB	To Confederation College	College: 2	45 min (weekdays from 19:00–22:00 excluding summer. Not reintroduced Fall 2026 due to diversion)
17	Current River	NB	To Cowan & Hodder	SB	To Waterfront Terminal	Waterfront: 9	30 min
17	Current River	NB	To Cowan & Hodder	SB	To Waterfront Terminal	Waterfront: 1	45 min
18	Westfort	EB	To City Hall Terminal	WB	To Mary & Neebing	City Hall: 3M	30 min
18	Westfort	EB	To City Hall Terminal	WB	To Mary & Neebing	City Hall: 1	45 min

=== Bus frequency ===
Peak routes run Monday to Friday between 6:00 am and 6:00 pm, and Saturday between 10:00 am and 6:00 pm. Most peak routes have a frequency of 30 minutes between stops. The exceptions are routes 3M, 4, and 6. 3M Memorial has a frequency of 15 minutes during rushhour. The rural routes 4 and 6 only run at select times on weekdays. Non-peak routes run Monday to Saturday between 6:00 pm and 11:30 pm, Saturday morning between 6:00 am and 10:00 am, all day Sunday and statutory holidays. Most non-peak routes have a frequency of 40–45 minutes between stops, except the busiest routes (1 Mainline, 3M Memorial, and 2 Crosstown on weekdays). They typically have 22.5 minutes headway. 30 minute service is extended until 7:00 PM weekdays and Saturday effective 24 August 2025.

=== Rural bus service ===
Thunder Bay Transit resumed service to rural areas within city limits in spring 2008 as part of a pilot project funded by the city's share of provincial gas tax revenue. Ridership on both routes was well below the municipal guideline of 10 passengers per hour of service.

Service resumed in South Neebing on March 18, after being cancelled in 2004 due to low ridership. The route operated on Tuesday and Thursday, with two runs in the morning and two runs in the afternoon. The route averaged 1 passenger per hour of service, and cost $73 per passenger to operate. The trial cost $19,200, and brought in only $400 in revenue, resulting in a net cost of $18,800. Service to South Neebing ended on November 27.

Service resumed in McIntyre on June 4, after a telephone survey conducted by the city found some demand for transit service in the area, which had bus service in the 1980s and 1990s. The route operated on Wednesday and Saturday, with two runs in the morning and two in the afternoon. The route averaged 0.5 passengers per hour of service, and cost $148 per passenger to operate. The trial cost $15,600, and brought in only $200 in revenue, resulting in a net cost of $15,400. Service to McIntyre ended on November 29.

In the present day, only there are 2 rural routes. The 4 Neebing route is a circular route which connects Broadway Avenue, Fort William Historical Park, Rosslyn Road, and rural Arthur Street to the city's Westfort ward. Rarely, route 4 buses will also go to City Hall Terminal, but only when buses are entering service or being pulled out. The 6 Mission Rd. route connects the Fort William First Nation reserve on the opposite side of the Kaministiquia River to the city's Westfort ward. Both buses only run weekdays daytime and are interlined.

=== Interlining ===
When buses on certain routes arrive at a transit terminal, they will resume travel on different routes. Interlining allows passengers to travel longer distances without having to change buses.

Interlining at City Hall terminal
Peak routes
At HH:00 and HH:30
- 3M Memorial becomes 18 Westfort
- 8 James becomes 14 Arthur
- 10 Northwood becomes 3M Memorial (County Park bound)
- 14 Arthur becomes 8 James
At HH:15 and HH:30
- 3M Memorial becomes 10 Northwood
- 12 East End becomes 16 Balmoral
- 18 Westfort becomes 3M Memorial (Jumbo Gardens bound)
Non-peak routes
Every 45 minutes:
- 1 Mainline becomes 18 Westfort
- 3M Memorial becomes 10 Northwood
- 8 James becomes 14 Arthur
- 10 Northwood becomes 3M Memorial (County Park bound)
- 14 Arthur becomes 8 James
- 18 Westfort becomes 1 Mainline

Interlining at Water Street terminal
Peak routes
At HH:00 and HH:30
- 3J Jumbo Gardens becomes 3M Memorial (Westfort bound, marked as “To City Hall”)
- 3M Memorial becomes 3C County Park
- 7 Hudson becomes 11 John
- 9 Junot becomes 17 Current River
- 11 John becomes 7 Hudson
At HH:15 and HH:45
- 3C County Park becomes 3M Memorial (Northwood bound)
- 3M Memorial becomes 3J Jumbo Gardens
- 17 Current River becomes 9 Junot
Non-peak routes
Every 45 minutes:
- 1 Mainline becomes 17 Current River
- 3C County Park becomes 3M Memorial (Northwood bound)
- 3M Memorial becomes 3C County Park
- 7 Hudson becomes 13 John Jumbo
- 13 John Jumbo becomes 7 Hudson
- 17 Current River becomes 1 Mainline

Interlining elsewhere
- 15 Beverly and 9 Junot interline at Lakehead University.
- 4 Neebing and 6 Mission interline at Brown and Frederica (in Westfort).
- 2 Crosstown and 5 Edward interline at Confederation College. On weekday evenings, the extra 2 Crosstown runs and 16 Balmoral are interlined at the same location.
- Due to a long-term diversion, 16 Balmoral becomes 12 East End at Balmoral Street and Dease Street instead of City Hall Terminal

== Fleet ==
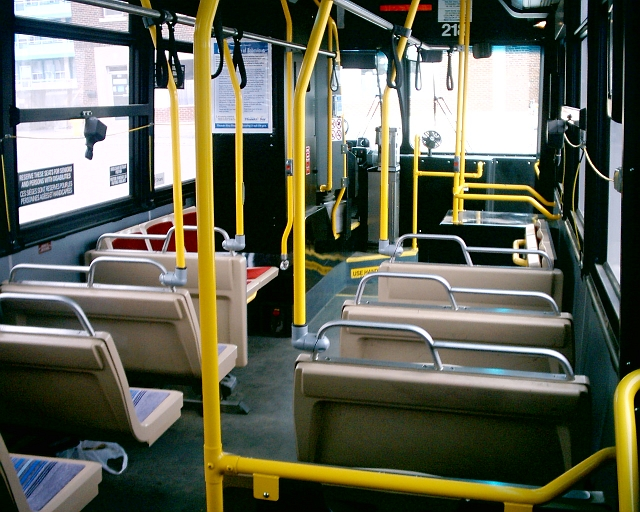
Interior of bus #218, a bio-diesel Orion VII.

Thunder Bay Transit owns a fleet of 51 buses, which consists of all Nova Bus LFSs and 3 New Flyer XD40s. Blended biodiesel fuel was piloted around 2007, and are all handicapped accessible low-floor models. Thunder Bay Transit is the first full-sized transit system in Ontario to have a fleet entirely of low-floor buses.

Thunder Bay Transit Bus Fleet (Historical and Present)
Series		Manufacturer	Model	Description	Year	In service/ Retired
	102, 103	General Motors	“Fishbowl” T6H-5307N	53' Diesel bus	1980	Retired before 2007
	105–110	Orion Bus Industries	05.501	40' Diesel bus	1992	Retired before 2007
Disabled access	111–125	New Flyer Industries	D40LF	40' Diesel bus	1994	Retired
Disabled access	126–129	Nova Bus	Nova Bus LFS	40' Diesel bus	1997	Retired
Disabled access	130–134	Nova Bus	Nova Bus LFS	40' Diesel bus	1999	Retired
Disabled access	135, 136	Nova Bus	Nova Bus LFS	40' Diesel bus	2001	Retired
Disabled access	137–141	Nova Bus	Nova Bus LFS	40' Diesel bus	2004	Retired
Disabled access	142–144	Nova Bus	Nova Bus LFS	40' Diesel bus	2006	Retired (142 retired 2023; 143 retired 2021; 144 retired 2022)
Disabled access	145–147	Nova Bus	Nova Bus LFS	40' Diesel bus	2007	Partially Retired (145 retired 2022)
Disabled access	148–150, 152, 156, 157, 159, 160	Nova Bus	Nova Bus LFS	40' Diesel bus	2008	In Service
Disabled access	161, 163, 164	Nova Bus	Nova Bus LFS	40' Diesel bus	2009	In Service
Disabled access	165-170	Nova Bus	Nova Bus LFS	40' Diesel bus	2011	In Service
Disabled access	172-174	Nova Bus	Nova Bus LFS	40' Diesel bus	2013	In Service
Disabled access	176, 177	Nova Bus	Nova Bus LFS	40' Diesel bus	2014	In Service
Disabled access	178-180	Nova Bus	Nova Bus LFS	40' Diesel bus	2015	In Service
Disabled access	181, 183, 185	Nova Bus	Nova Bus LFS	40' Diesel bus	2016	In Service
	193–197	General Motors	“Fishbowl” T6H-5307N	53' Diesel bus	1978	Retired before 2007
	198–200	General Motors	“Fishbowl” T6H-5307N	53' Diesel bus	1980	Retired before 2007
Disabled access	210–217	Orion Bus Industries	06.501	40' Diesel bus	1999	Retired
Disabled access	218–221	Orion Bus Industries	07.501	40' Diesel bus	2004	Retired
Disabled access	223-236	Nova Bus	Nova Bus LFS	40' Diesel bus	2017	In Service
Disabled access	239, 240	Nova Bus	Nova Bus LFS	40' Diesel bus	2022	In Service
Disabled access	241, 242	Nova Bus	Nova Bus LFS	40' Diesel bus	2023	In Service
	248-250	New Flyer Industries	Xcelsior XD40	40' Diesel bus	2026	In Service

=== Technology ===
Since September 2007, Thunder Bay Transit buses have been using the Grey Island Systems GPS/AVL and NextBus real-time passenger information systems, which uses GPS sensors and electronic maps to track bus movement and devices to measure passenger numbers. The system uses TBayTel's CDMA wireless network to relay information to the transit office and to electronic signs located at major transit stops to let riders know when their bus will arrive. These electronic signs are located at the Thunder Bay Regional Health Sciences Centre, Lakehead University, Confederation College, Intercity Shopping Centre, and Thunder Bay Transit's two downtown transit terminals, with a seventh sign planned for the Westfort neighbourhood in the city's south end. A test of the system was released on March 17, 2008, and allowed passengers to view arrival times for routes 2 Crosstown, 3 Northwood, 8 James and 9 Junot.

=== Accessibility ===
To accommodate disabled passengers, Thunder Bay Transit buses are wheelchair accessible low-floor models. Low-floor buses are capable of kneeling to street level and have extending ramps which allow wheelchairs to board safely. Thunder Bay Transit buses had 19,175 rides by persons in wheelchairs in 2006, the most per capita in Ontario." Thunder Bay Transit offers a Night Stop service, where buses will allow passengers to disembark at locations between bus stops during night hours due to safety or security concerns.

== Facilities ==
Thunder Bay Transit operates two bus terminals in the north and south cores of the city. Thunder Bay Transit's head office and bus garage is located at Thunder Bay Transit and Central Maintenance, located at 570 Fort William Road. In addition, three points of interests are major transit hubs in the city: Lakehead University, Confederation College, and Intercity Shopping Centre.

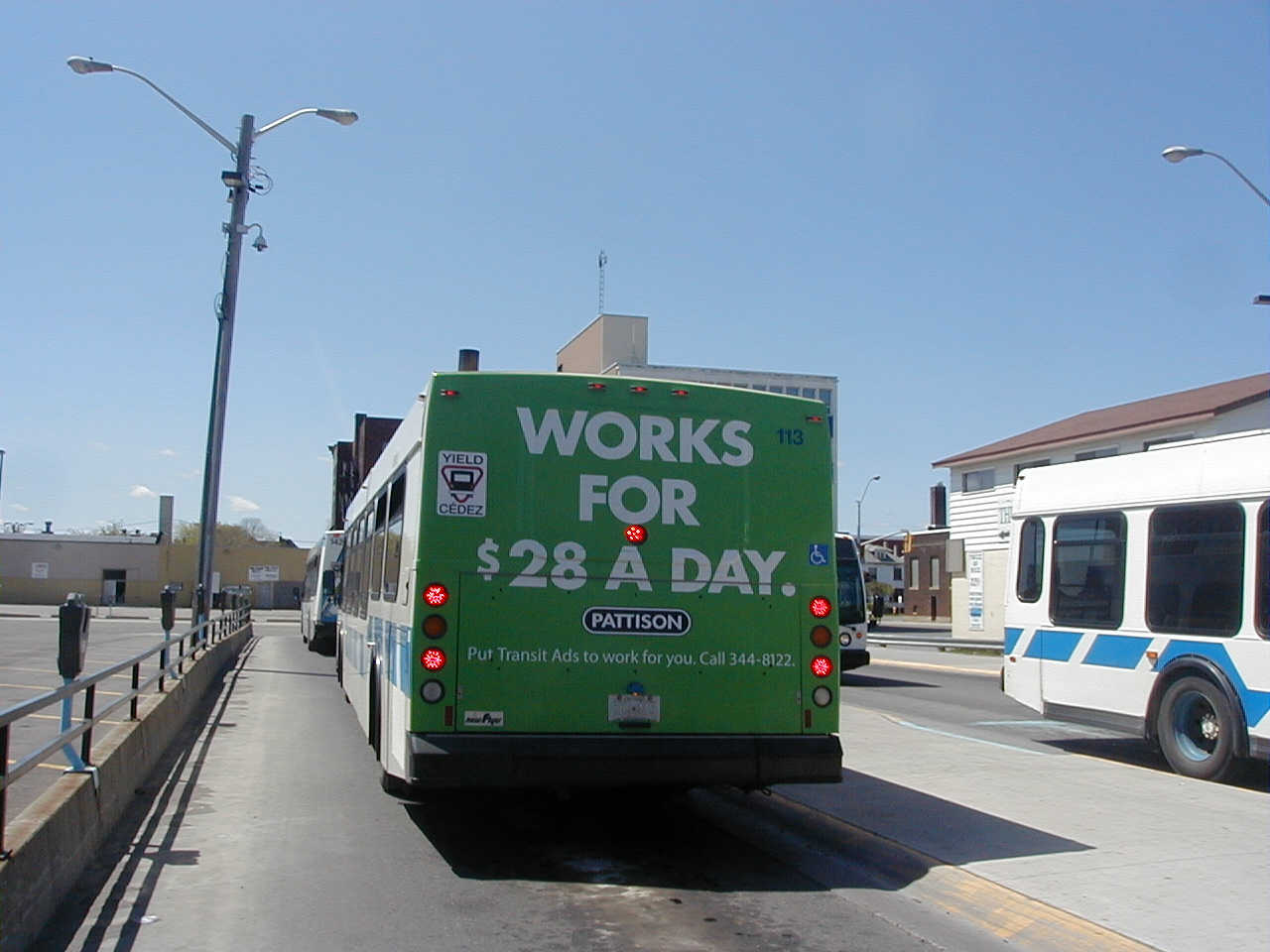
A New Flyer D40LF at the former Brodie St. Terminal (replaced by City Hall Terminal)

=== City Hall Terminal ===
Address: 500 Donald Street East, Thunder Bay
Functions: downtown south core bus terminal; heated waiting area (City Hall lobby).
Platforms: street level on Brodie Street, Donald Street and May Street around the plaza in front of city hall.
Routes: 1 Mainline, 3M Memorial, 4 Neebing (limited), 8 James, 10 Northwood, 12 East End, 14 Arthur, 16 Balmoral, 18 Westfort
Established: 2010 to replace Brodie Street Terminal - now the site of the Thunder Bay Courthouse

A Novabus LFS at Water St. Terminal

=== Waterfront Terminal ===
Address: 40 North Water Street, Thunder Bay
Coordinates: 48°26′08.7″N 89°13′01″W
Functions: downtown north core bus terminal; heated waiting area
Platforms: 1
Routes: 1 Mainline, 2 Crosstown, 3C County Park, 3J Jumbo Garden, 3M Memorial, 7 Hudson, 9 Junot, 11 John, 13 John Jumbo, 17 Current River
Renovated: Modernization renovation from July 2025 to April 2026
Former Name: Water Street Terminal

=== Lakehead University ===
Address: 955 Oliver Road, Thunder Bay
Function: Connection with Lakehead University; Transfer point
Platforms: 1 (Sidewalk along Agora Circle)
Routes: 2 Crosstown, 9 Junot, 15 Beverly

=== Confederation College ===
Address: 1450 Nakina Drive, Thunder Bay
Function: Connection with Confederation College; Transfer point
Platforms: 1
Routes: 2 Crosstown, 5 Edward, 8 James, 10 Northwood, 16 Balmoral

=== Intercity Shopping Centre ===
Address: 1000 Fort William Road, Thunder Bay
Function: Connection to Intercity Shopping Centre; Transfer point
Platforms: 2 (Dedicated northbound platform, Sidewalk southbound platform)
Routes: 1 Mainline, 3 Memorial, 8 James, 12 East End, 15 Beverly

=== Transit Garage ===
Thunder Bay Transit and Central Maintenance
Address: 570 Fort William Road
Coordinates: 48°25′02″N 89°14′11″W
Functions: main office and vehicle maintenance

=== Other transfer points ===
The intersection of Brown Street and Frederica Street in Westfort is a transfer point for routes 18 Westfort, 5 Edward, 4 Neebing, and 6 Mission.

The Thunder Bay Regional Hospital is another location that has good connection by transit. It is served by 2 Crosstown and 9 Junot. It also has an electronic sign indicating live bus times.

== See also ==
- Transportation in Thunder Bay, Ontario
- Public transport in Canada
