= Transportation in Thunder Bay, Ontario =

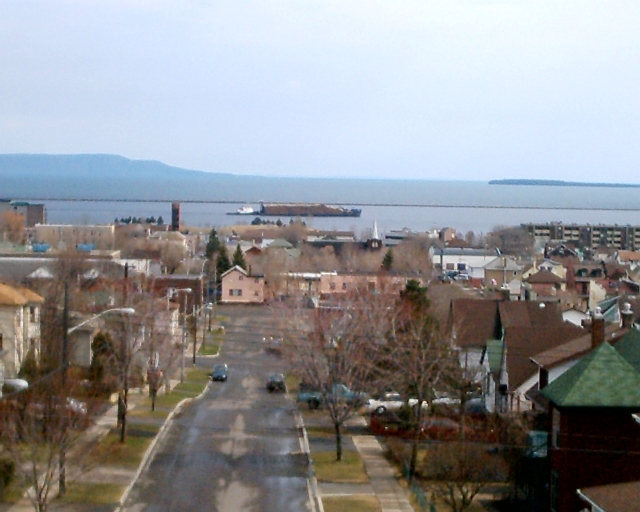
A boat carrying wood in the harbour

Transport in Thunder Bay is essential to trade, which has always been the backbone of the economy, beginning with Fort Kaministiquia in 1717. When the area was first settled its many waterways were used by the voyagers and Coureur des bois to trade their goods.

Thunder Bay has a central location within Canada, and is located in the middle of the Trans-Canada Highway system, crossed by railways, and is the location of the largest outbound port on the St. Lawrence Seaway System and the fifth busiest airport in Ontario by aircraft movements.

== Highways ==
Thunder Bay Expressway

Concurrency of Trans-Canada Highway 11/17 originates 1 km east of Nipigon and terminates approximately 45 km west of Thunder Bay. This highway passes through Thunder Bay, coming from the northeast and crossing key east-west arteries. At the intersection of the Harbour Expressway in Thunder Bay, the Trans-Canada designation turns west, with the continuing highway heading south to Minnesota being designated as Highway 61.

The stretch of Highway from 11/17 in Nipigon to Highway 61 and Arthur Street in Thunder Bay is designated as the Terry Fox Courage Highway. The Thunder Bay Expressway is an urban highway corridor that is composed of Highway 11/17 between Hodder Avenue to Harbour Expressway and Highway 61 from Harbour Expressway to Arthur Street and the Thunder Bay Airport.

Other highways in the city are Highway 102, located between the intersection of Highway 11/17 at Red River Road in the east and the community of Kaministiquia in the west. While it used to be used as a shortcut bypassing Kakebeka Falls, Highway 102 has been the subject of safety discussions - leading to the implementation of a designated truck route in the Thunder Bay Area in 2025. Highway 61 begins at the intersection of the Harbour Expressway and Highway 11/17 and leads south to the United States border, becoming Minnesota State Highway 61. Highway 589 connects Highway 102 to Dog Lake, located in Gorham and Ware Townships, northeast of the city.

The Harbour Expressway is a four-lane highway bisecting the city laterally in the Intercity and Balmoral Park areas. The "expressway" designation of both the Thunder Bay and Harbour expressways has been called into question, as both routes feature multiple lighted intersections, and are not true expressways.

Formerly, the highway 11/17 used to follow the entirety of the Thunder Bay Expressway (built in the 1960s) and turn west on Arthur Street. However, to bypass the urban sprawl in the south end of the city, a new stretch of highway, called the "Shabaqua Highway", was built between 1997 and 2007. It begins at the intersection of the Thunder Bay and Harbour Expressways in Thunder Bay and travels 13 km west to the intersection of Vibert Road and the Trans-Canada in Paipoonge. This is the current alignment of Highway 11/17 and the remainder sections of the Thunder Bay Expressway (south) is Highway 61.

== City Streets ==
Thunder Bay is mainly made up of a gridded road network; because it is made up of many smaller communities amalgamated together, many individualized grid systems exist throughout the city. The most notable grids are the ones in older areas of Port Arthur and Fort William, as well as the majority or all of Current River and Westfort. In the case of the Port Arthur grid, it does not run true north–south, instead running parallel to the waterfront. Here, Red River Road functions as the divider of the north and south sections of the area. In Fort William, the intersection of Edward Street and Victoria Avenue is designated as the starting point, and nearly the entire south side is divided into quadrants radiating from the intersection. In neighbourhoods constructed since the 1970s, streets usually do not conform to any grid system, and instead are made up of curvature crescents and cul-de-sacs.

Due to the separate grid and address-numbering systems present throughout the city, major arterial roads are required to change names several times through their courses, in particular those passing through the Intercity area. From east to west, there are four such arteries: Fort William Road, Memorial Avenue, Balmoral Street, and Golf Links Road.

From South to North, some noteworthy east-west arteries are: Walsh Street, Arthur Street, Victoria Avenue, Churchill Drive, William Street, Central Avenue, Oliver Road, John Street, Red River Road, and River Street. Hodder Avenue, in Current River, extends the Cumberland Street corridor to Highway 11/17.

== Public transit ==
Public transit has been present in the Thunder Bay area since 1892. Both Port Arthur and Fort William operated streetcars until the late 1940s, when they were replaced by electric trolley buses. When the cities amalgamated in 1970, both transit systems were merged into Thunder Bay Transit, which has exclusively used diesel buses since 1972.

Thunder Bay Transit provides 20 routes across the city's urban area with bus frequencies on most routes being between 15 and 45 minutes. There are two major terminals (in both downtown cores) and three minor hubs at key points in the city (Lakehead University, Confederation College, and Intercity Shopping Centre). The base fare is $3.25, but there are also other passes.

=== HAGI Transit ===
The Handicapped Action Group Incorporated operates a door-to-door transit service for seniors and persons who are unable to use City Transit. Users must register with HAGI to use the service, which is funded by the city of Thunder Bay.

=== Bus terminals ===
Thunder Bay Transit operates two bus terminals, one in each downtown core. The Ontario Northland intercity bus service stops at 1475 Walsh St. W.

== Railway ==
CP Engines in Thunder Bay

Thunder Bay is an important railway hub, served by both the Canadian National and Canadian Pacific Railway. The city is intersected in many places by railway lines, most notably the CN line which runs diagonally through Thunder Bay South and Intercity, cutting off traffic along major arterials.

Major rail yards are located southwest of the airport, south and east of downtown Fort William and immediately south of the East End neighbourhood, and between the city and the waterfront harbour in the intercity area.

Passenger rail service to Thunder Bay ended on 15 January 1990, with the move of Via Rail Canada's The Canadian service to the northern route. The CPR Union Depot (1910) remains in Fort William, with the CNR station (1905) providing tourism related services in Marina Park.

== Harbour ==
Thunder Bay Port is the westernmost port of the Canadian portion of the St. Lawrence Seaway. It is located over 3000 km from the Atlantic Ocean. The port is capable of handling all types of cargoes, and is served by the Canadian National and Canadian Pacific Railways. It has numerous berths allowing for a quick turn-around time. The main cargoes handled at the port are grain, coal, potash, and forest products.

Keefer Terminal is the main cargo handling facility, which has 500,000 square metres of indoor storage area and 6.4 hectares of outdoor storage area. Thunder Bay Terminals Ltd. provides a rail and vessel link for the movement of low sulphur bituminous and lignite coal from western Canada, and is located on McKeller Island.

=== Grain terminals ===
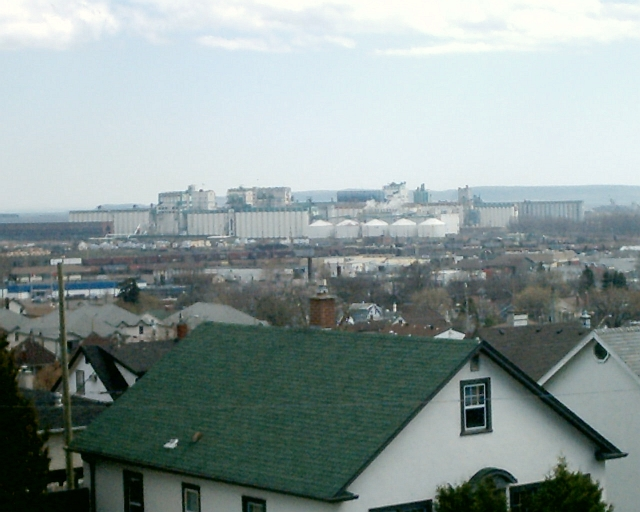
Grain elevators.

Thunder Bay is well known for its many grain elevators, dubbed "Castles of Commerce", on its waterfront. Thunder Bay is the second largest grain port in Canada, making it an important part of Canadian grain exports. Sixteen grain elevators are located on the waterfront, however only nine are currently operational. The nine grain elevators have a capacity of 1.4 million tonnes and are capable of handing wheat, durum, coarse grains, oilseeds, feed grains, peas and crops as well as various grain by-products.

=== History ===
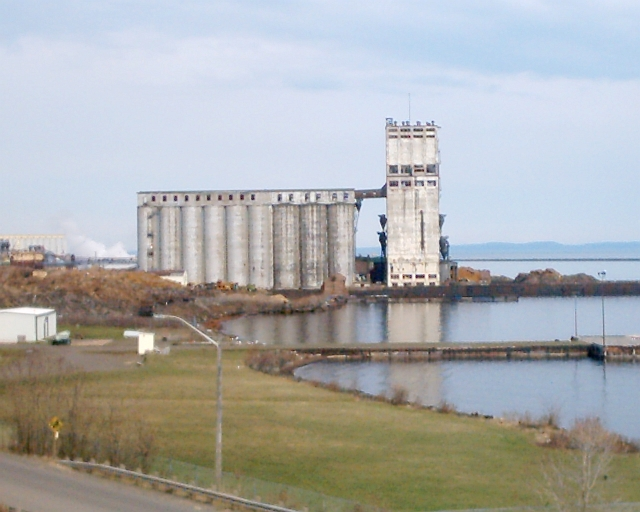
Abandoned grain elevator

Thunder Bay has been a port since the days of the North West Company which maintained a schooner on Lake Superior. Significant navigation came after 1855 with the opening of the canal at Sault Ste. Marie (Soo Locks) which allowed ships coming from the lower lakes to bypass the rapids of the St. Marys River. To facilitate navigation, the federal government dredged the Kaministiquia River from 1873 onwards and built a large breakwater in Thunder Bay beginning in 1884. Thunder Bay Port Authority manages Keefer Terminal built on a 320,000 square metre site on Lake Superior.

Until the 1970s, coal, grain, iron ore and package freight were handled through the port in enormous quantities. Gradually, shipping by train and boat diminished as most package freight is transported by road. The railway's Intermodal freight transport has done away with the costly transshipment of individual goods between boxcars and lake freighters. Combined with loss of grain subsidies (the Crow Rate) and the free trade agreement with the United States, have terminated Thunder Bay's privileged position as a linchpin in Canadian east–west trade. As a result, the city has lost its traditional raison d'être as a break-bulk point, and the city is in economic decline.

== Air travel ==
The city is served by the Thunder Bay International Airport, the fifth busiest airport in Ontario. The airport is serviced by Air Canada, WestJet, Flair Airlines, Bearskin Airlines, Wasaya Airways, Air Creebec, Skyservice, Thunder Airlines, Air Bravo, Porter Airlines, and NAC Air.
