= Thunder Bay 50/50 Draw =

Canadian non-profit fundraising lottery

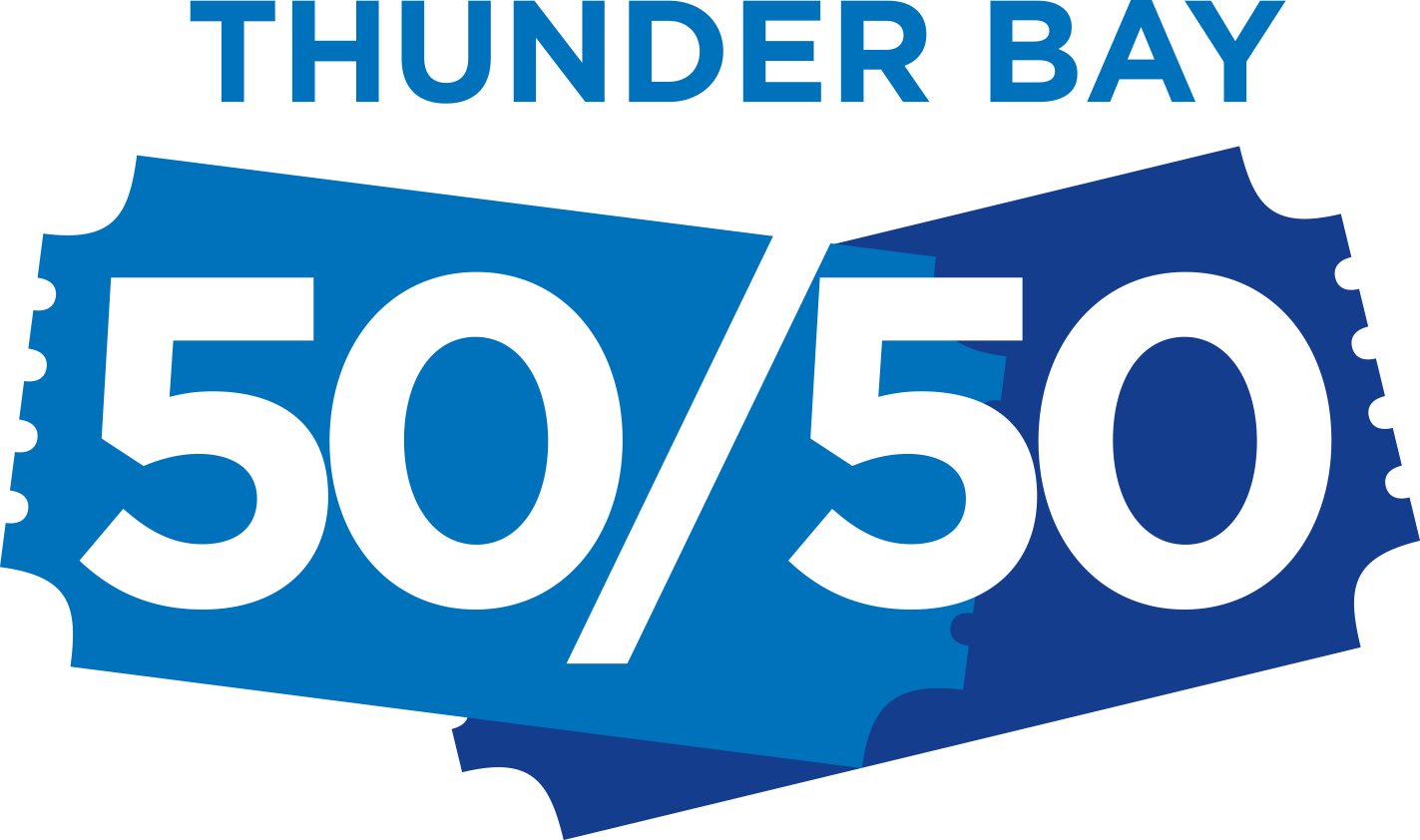
- Formation: January 13, 2021; 5 years ago
- Type: CRA-designated Registered Charity (888314648RR0001)
- Tax ID no.: 2025-2026 Lottery Licence: RAF1500864
- Headquarters: Thunder Bay Regional Health Sciences Foundation; 980 Oliver Road Thunder Bay, Ontario P7B 6V4 Canada
- President and CEO: Glenn Craig
- Director, Charitable Gaming: Torin Gunnell
- Website: www.thunderbay5050.ca
- Remarks: Over $106 million awarded as of July 2026.

The Thunder Bay Regional Health Sciences Foundation’s Thunder Bay 50/50 Draw in support of the Thunder Bay Regional Health Sciences Centre is the largest monthly hospital 50/50 draw in Canada, and one of the largest 50/50 draws in Canada of any kind.

As of July 2026's Grand Prize Draw, the Thunder Bay 50/50 Draw had awarded over $106 million Bavya Faldu won $2.77 million on July 31, 2026. and created 36 millionaires.

The Thunder Bay 50/50 has also had a considerable impact on healthcare in Northwestern Ontario. In November 2025, the Foundation announced a record $23 million in funding to 42 Thunder Bay Regional Health Sciences Centre programs and services including $9.3 million towards costs associated with the construction of a new Cardiovascular Surgery (CVS) Program due in large part to the Thunder Bay 50/50.

"This is going to help everything, from helping the cardiac surgery program become a reality, helping bring a new linear accelerator to our cancer program, helping with the emergency department, helping with the mental health department, surgery, diagnostic imaging beds that are going across this facility," Foundation president and CEO Glenn Craig said. "Every service at the hospital has benefited from this announcement today."

Other hospital foundations across Canada cite foundation president and CEO Glenn Craig as key to the Thunder Bay 50/50 Draw's success. Queensway Carleton foundation's president and CEO Shannon Gorman said that Craig had done a great job of marketing. “We’re trying to model after that,” she said.

== History ==
The Thunder Bay Regional Health Sciences Foundation launched the Thunder Bay 50/50 Draw on January 13, 2021 with a guaranteed prize of $5,000. “as a way to raise much-needed money for new hospital equipment and programs during the COVID-19 pandemic”. The Foundation was forced to cancel many events due to COVID restrictions, which threatened funding for Thunder Bay Regional Health Sciences Centre capital projects and in turn patient care in Northwestern Ontario.

The first Grand Prize Draw took place on February 26, 2021; two Early Bird draws of $500 each took place on January 29 and February 12. Initially, the organization hoped to reach “six figures” in the first draw. However, the first Grand Prize won by sisters Paulette Howe and Suzanne Gribben reached $965,715, exceeding expectations.

The Thunder Bay 50/50 quickly became successful. The Thunder Bay 50/50 opened a “pop-up store” for the Christmas season in November 2022 in the Intercity Shopping Centre food court.

In January 2024, then-Foundation Chair, Parker Jones, called the Thunder Bay 50/50 “life changing for all of us” because the draw changes the lives of the winners as well as patients since the proceeds fund hospital projects. Others agreed including ticket buyers. Dennis Wilson, who won over $2.1 million with his wife Dorothy in November 2025, said that buying Thunder Bay 50/50 tickets is a “win-win” because it supports the regional hospital.

By June 2024, proceeds from the draw helped fund a new MRI, a new PET/CT scanner, and a new catheterization laboratory (Cath Lab) for the hospital, among other projects.

Six months later, the Thunder Bay 50/50 awarded its largest prize to that point when Natalie and Clem Bigras of Hamner, Ontario won over $6.4 million in the December Draw.

In November 2025, the Foundation announced $22,815,488 in funding for the hospital – the single largest funding amount to that time – thanks in large part to the Thunder Bay 50/50.[21][22] Also that month, the Thunder Bay 50/50 made its pop-up store permanent; selling tickets in-person at the mall year-round.[23]

Glenn Craig, President and CEO of the Health Sciences Foundation, said that with the costs of medical equipment going up, the Foundation plays a “larger and larger part” in making sure the healthcare professionals at the hospital have the tools they need.

In five and a half years from its inception to July 2026, the Thunder Bay 50/50 Draw awarded over $106 million in cash prizes.

== Timeline ==
January 13, 2021: Thunder Bay 50/50 Draw officially launches.

February 26, 2021: Paulette Howe and Suzanne Gribben, two sisters from Thunder Bay, win the first Thunder Bay 50/50 Grand Prize of $965,715.

December 2021: David Kamande of Thunder Bay is the first person to become a millionaire in the Thunder Bay 50/50 draw, winning over $2.3 million in the 2021 December Draw.

November 2022: The Foundation opens its first Thunder Bay 50/50 Draw pop-up store for the 2022 Christmas season.

August 2023: The last time the Grand Prize was below $1 million.

August 2025: First collaboration between the Thunder Bay 50/50 Draw and the Thunder Bay and District Humane Society. It was also the first month of a string of Grand Prizes all over $2 million (ongoing as of July 2026).

January 2025: Natalie and Clem Bigras won over $6.4 million, another record at the time.

January 2026: The Foundation awarded its largest Thunder Bay 50/50 Grand Prize ever when Patrick Chilton of Timmins and Moose Factory won $7,720,930.

July 2026: Bhavya Faldu won $2.77 million, the largest Grand Prize ever awarded outside of the special December/Christmas draws.
