= Mary J. L. Black =

Canadian librarian and suffragist

Mary Johanna Louisa Black
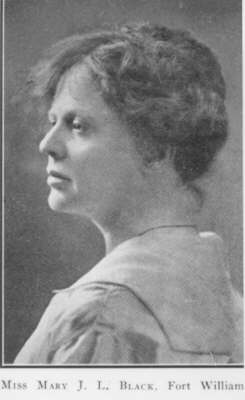
- Born: April 1, 1879; Uxbridge, Ontario
- Died: January 4, 1939 (aged 59); Vancouver, British Columbia
- Occupation: Librarian

Mary Johanna Louisa Black (1879-1939) was a Canadian librarian and suffragist. Black was the president of the Ontario Library Association from 1917 to 1918 and was a member of the American Library Association.

== Early life ==
Mary Johanna Louisa Black was born on April 1, 1879, in Uxbridge, Ontario, to parents Fergus Black and Georgina Elizabeth Macdonald. Mary had four brothers. In September 1907, several years after the death of her mother, Mary and her father relocated to Fort William, Ontario, to live with Mary's brother, Davidson William.

== Career ==
Despite her lack of formal education, Black was appointed Chief Librarian of the Fort William Public Library in 1909. She was the first librarian there. When Black began working at the library, it was a single room in the City Hall basement. In 1912, with funding from American philanthropist Andrew Carnegie, the Fort William Public Library opened its Carnegie Library, renamed the Brodie Resource Library in 1970 after the incorporation of Thunder Bay. As part of her work as Chief Librarian, Black organized the first mobile library collections in Ontario and was a proponent the rights of rural citizens to access public libraries.

In 1913, Black became a councillor of the Ontario Library Association. Black later served as president of the Ontario Library Association from 1917 to 1918. She was the first woman to be appointed to that position.

In 1918, Black was elected a school trustee. She was re-elected to the same position in 1920. Black supported Robert James Manion across party lines when he sough federal election in 1917 as a Unionist and in 1921 when Manion ran as a conservative.

Black was a member of the American Library Association, which, at the time, represented both Canadian and American libraries. She held several positions there including being a member of the extension board, being the chair of the Small Libraries Round Table, and being the chair of the lending section. From 1918 to 1932, Black was actively involved with the Thunder Bay Historical Society. Her involvement included serving as secretary-treasurer and maintaining the archives. Black was the society's president from 1928 to 1932.

Black, John Ridington, and George H. Locke were hired by the Carnegie corporation to form a commission of inquiry into the conditions of Canadian public libraries. Black toured Canada with her fellow commissioners, beginning in 1930, to investigate the libraries across the country. The commission concluded in 1933 with the publication of Libraries in Canada: A Study of Library Conditions and Needs.

Black, along with Dr. Clara Todson and Anne J. Barrie, co-led the women's suffrage and reform movement in the twin cities of Port Arthur and Fort William, which were later almagameted into Thunder Bay. From 1916 to 1918, Black was the president of the Fort William branch of the Women's Canadian Club which she also founded. Black was also a member of the West Algoma Equal Suffrage Association and the Women's Business Club, the latter of which she was the president of in 1921. Black was also the district commissioner for the Girl Guides of Canada.

Black was forced to retire from the Fort William Library in the spring of 1937 due to illness.

== Death and legacy ==
Due to her ill health, in late 1938, Black relocated to Vancouver, British Columbia, to stay with her brother, Norman F. Black. She died in Vancouver on January 4, 1939.

In 1938, a branch of the Thunder Bay Public Library in Thunder Bay, Ontario was dedicated the Mary J. L. Black Library. The Mary J. L. Black Library was renovated in 2010 with estimated costs around four million dollars. In 2018, the Ontario Library Association posthumously recognized Black's achievements with a plaque at the Thunder Bay Public Library.
