= Thunder Bay Regional Health Sciences Foundation =

Canadian non-profit fundraising organization

- Formation: April 1, 2008; 18 years ago
- Type: CRA-designated Registered Charity
- Tax ID no.: 888314648RR0001
- Headquarters: 980 Oliver Road Thunder Bay, Ontario P7B 6V4 Canada 807-345-4673
- Method: "Our mission is to inspire the people of Northwestern Ontario to give generously to advance our healthcare at Thunder Bay Regional Health Sciences Centre."
- President and CEO: Glenn Craig
- Staff: 20 (estimate)
- Website: www.healthsciencesfoundation.ca
- Remarks: $81 million in grants issued as of November 2025

The Thunder Bay Regional Health Sciences Foundation (Health Sciences Foundation) is a not-for-profit organization in Thunder Bay, Ontario. Its mission is to "inspire the people of Northwestern Ontario to give generously to advance our healthcare at Thunder Bay Regional Health Sciences Centre". Donations to the Health Sciences Foundation primarily support new medical equipment, technology, programs, and services at the hospital and for hospital satellite programs throughout the region. The Foundation also supports local research including breast cancer research and research projects at the Thunder Bay Regional Health Research Institute.

In November 2025, the Foundation committed a record $22.8 million to support hospital initiatives including $9.3 million for the new Cardiovascular Surgery (CVS) Program, $3 million to upgrade 195 inpatient beds over five years, and $1 million for costs related to the installation of a new linear accelerator for radiation therapy, among other projects. The Thunder Bay 50/50 Draw accounted for a large portion of that funding.

== Governance ==
The Health Sciences Foundation is governed by a Board of Directors of 12 board members and several observers. The Board provides strategic direction and oversees fiduciary and other responsibilities. The current Board Chair as of 2026 is Dr. Stephen Adams.

=== Grants Committee ===
One of the most important roles of the Board of Directors is to review and award grants. Guided by its mission to “to inspire the people of Northwestern Ontario to give generously to advance our health care at Thunder Bay Regional Health Sciences Centre”, the Board considers all applications from various departments of the Thunder Bay Regional Health Sciences Centre. This includes research projects from the Thunder Bay Regional Health Research Institute and its scientists. The Board also funds select community-driven projects that directly benefit patients.

Applications are first reviewed by a Grants Committee, which consists of Foundation board members, physicians, community members, and donors who bring a wide range of perspectives on hospital and community needs. The committee follows strict guidelines and a scoring matrix to select appropriate projects. The primary goal is to fund projects that have the largest impact on patient care. Special emphasis is put on projects and equipment that support closer-to-home healthcare programs and services. The Foundation Board reviews all selections presented by the committee for another layer of diligence and transparency. The Board funds as many approved grant applications as that year’s budget allows.

In 2025, the Foundation approved almost $23 million in funding through 43 grants ranging from $5,000 to $3 million. It represented the single largest commitment in the Foundation’s history to that point

=== Donor Bill of Rights ===
The Health Sciences Foundation upholds a Donor Bill of Rights which includes the right to be assured that their gifts will be used for the purpose for which they were given and that information about their donations is handled with respect and with confidentiality.

== Funds ==
The Thunder Bay Regional Health Sciences Foundation accepts donations through several different primary funds representing different areas of need. The Foundation also maintains over a hundred different funds to support dedicated areas of care.

=== Northern Cardiac Fund ===
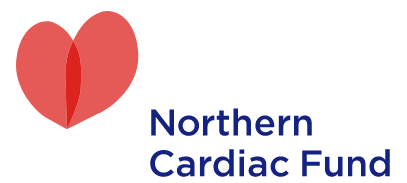

Residents in Northern Ontario have a higher risk of cardiovascular disease and a higher mortality rate due cardiovascular disease. This is in part due to higher rates of major risk factors including smoking, nutrition, inactivity, obesity, and diabetes rates. Despite the greater need, residents in Northwestern Ontario have to travel the farthest of any other patients in Ontario for advanced services such as cardiac surgery.

The Health Sciences Foundation established the Northern Cardiac Fund to support “world-class cardiac care in Northwestern Ontario”. As of 2026, the Foundation is focusing its fundraising efforts on the Our Hearts at Home Campaign for Cardiovascular Surgery The campaign is raising funds for a new Cardiovascular Surgery (CVS) Program, which began construction in spring 2025 and is expected to open in early 2028.

=== Northern Cancer Fund ===
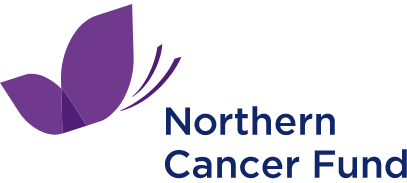

Carrying on the work of the original Northern Cancer Research Foundation, one of the two founding organizations of the new Thunder Bay Regional Health Sciences Foundation in 2008, the Northern Cancer Fund was created to, as stated in its mission, “improve cancer care right here in Northwestern Ontario so that we all have quality cancer care, closer-to-home, equip our cancer care specialists with the latest tools to provide us all with the best treatments available, and fund important local research for tomorrow's cancer treatments”.For example, the Foundation provided funding through the Northern Cancer Fund for renovations and equipment add-ons related to a new linear particle accelerator (linac) in November 2025.

=== Area of Highest Need Fund ===
Cancer and cardiac are the two main funds due to their impact on patient health (one and two in terms of mortality rates in Ontario) and generally higher cost of equipment. The Area of Highest Need Fund provides support for all other programs and services at the Thunder Bay Regional Health Sciences Centre. According to the website, “Donations to the Area of Highest Need support new medical equipment, technology and treatment programs in all areas of healthcare including paediatrics, renal, emergency and many others.” The fund is designed to support equipment and initiatives that are “most needed now”.

=== Family CARE Grant Program ===
Donors can also direct their gifts to the Family CARE (“Care Advancement Recommended by Employees”) Grant Program.

== Signature Events ==
Many fundraising events for the Thunder Bay Regional Health Sciences Foundation are community-driven events. However, the Foundation hosts several of its own Signature Events.

=== Motorcycle Ride for Dad ===
The Tbaytel Motorcycle Ride for Dad presented by PDR Contracting, which launched in 2001, is one of the Foundation’s longest-running signature events. Originally, it raised money and awareness about prostate cancer, but it has since grown in scope to include men’s prostate and urology health. From its inception to 2025, the event had raised over $1.2 million. Over 240 riders participated in 2025. The event itself takes place every year on the Saturday before Father’s Day in June. After a group breakfast, riders set out on their motorcycles on one of two poker runs around Thunder Bay and area, revving their engines for the traditional “Roar for the Cure”. Riders and spectators have said that this is the most moving part of the day for them. Participants can register online or during a traditional Registration BBQ in May. The Tbaytel Cruise for Dad briefly substituted for the Motorcycle Ride for Dad during the COVID-19 pandemic. The solo event allowed participants to ride on their own to allow for social distancing.

=== Luncheon of Hope ===
The Tbaytel Luncheon of Hope, one of the Foundation’s longest-running fundraisers, is an annual event that raises funds for breast cancer diagnosis, treatment and research. The Luncheon launched in 1993 and celebrated its 30th anniversary in 2023. The event features a vendor market, Bling Blitz, Travel Blitz, and lunch. A keynote speaker tells her breast cancer story. The Luncheon of Hope is “a chance to connect, reflect, and be inspired”. In 2025, 420 people attended the event. The Luncheon of Hope usually raises $30,000 to $40,000 for local breast cancer care. In 2025, TV personality Jeanne Beker and one of MuchMusic’s first video jockeys was the keynote speaker for the event, telling her own breast cancer story during an intimate fireside chat.

=== Chase the Case ===
The Bullseye Chase the Case presented by Doane Grant Thornton launched in 2025 as a game-show style charity auction similar to Deal or No Deal to raise funds for local breast cancer care. The evening's main live auction featured 20 prize packages hidden inside 20 silver cases. Packages range from concert and comedy tickets to home renovations valued around $1,000. The evening also featured carnival-style games, a silent auction, diamond earrings worth $1,000 and a four-course dinner. One Golden Case contained a “Welcome Home Windfall” including realty-related services worth over $10,000.The evening also features a keynote speaker who tells her breast cancer story to underline why closer-to-home cancer care is so important. Chase the Case raised $60,750 for local breast cancer care in its second year. The event replaced a previous signature event, the Bachelor’s of Hope Charity Auction.

=== Hearts Around the World ===
The Foundation’s Resolute Hearts Around the World Charity Auction raises funds for the Northern Cardiac Fund to support local cardiovascular care at the Thunder Bay Regional Health Sciences Centre. The first event, held November 2, 2024, featured auctions to several world destinations including Costa Rica, Mexico, Panama, Switzerland, and Italy. Another package features a customizable cruise for two. All packages were donated by Foundation donors or travel businesses in Thunder Bay. A silent auction offered stays in Lutsen, Minnesota (near Thunder Bay), flights from WestJet and Air Canada, clothing and jewellery from local donors, and other items for bids including a painting by a local artist. The evening also featured a five-course dinner based on the destinations. A certified chef created the menu with wine pairings arranged by a professional sommelier. A keynote speaker detailed his experience with travelling away from home for heart surgery, underlining why local cardiovascular services including surgery is so important. The first event raised over $85,000.

== Thunder Bay 50/50 Draw ==
The Thunder Bay Regional Health Sciences Foundation launched the Thunder Bay 50/50 Draw on January 13, 2021 “as a way to raise much-needed money for new hospital equipment and programs during the COVID-19 pandemic”. The Foundation was forced to cancel many events due to COVID restrictions, which threatened funding for Thunder Bay Regional Health Sciences Centre capital projects and in turn patient care in Northwestern Ontario.

The first Grand Prize Draw took place on February 26, 2021 with a guaranteed prize of $5,000; two Early Bird draws of $500 each took place on January 29 and February 12. Initially, the organization hoped to reach “six figures” in the first draw. However, the first Grand Prize won by sisters Paulette Howe and Suzanne Gribben reached $965,715, exceeding expectations.

The Thunder Bay 50/50 quickly became successful. By June 2024, proceeds from the draw helped fund a new MRI, a new PET/CT scanner, and a new catheterization laboratory (Cath Lab) for the hospital, among other projects. In November 2025, the Foundation announced $22,815,488 in funding for the hospital – the single largest funding amount to that time – thanks in large part to the Thunder Bay 50/50.

In January 2024, then-Foundation Chair, Parker Jones, called the Thunder Bay 50/50 “life changing for all of us” because the draw changes the lives of the winners as well as patients since the proceeds fund hospital projects. Others agreed including ticket buyers. Dennis Wilson, who won over $2.1 million with his wife Dorothy in November 2025, said that buying Thunder Bay 50/50 tickets is a “win-win” because it supports the Thunder Bay Regional Health Sciences Centre.

As of April 2026, the Thunder Bay 50/50 holds a number of records including the largest monthly 50/50 draw in Canada and has created three dozen millionaires. The draw had already been the largest hospital 50/50 draw in Canada for years. The December 2025 Draw reached a record $6,436,355 (won by Natalie and Clem Bigras), which at the time was the largest 50/50 lottery win in Ontario and the second-largest in Canada. The December 2026 Draw surpassed the previous Thunder Bay 50/50 record when Patrick Chilton won $7,720,930.

== Major Campaigns ==
=== Our Hearts at Home Campaign for Cardiovascular Surgery ===
The Our Hearts at Home Campaign for Cardiovascular Surgery officially launched on October 21, 2019 with a goal of raising $14 million to bring cardiovascular surgery services to Thunder Bay for closer-to-home care. Once completed, it would be the first time cardiac surgery would be “regularly performed in Northwestern Ontario”. The Thunder Bay Regional Health Sciences Centre originally planned to open the new service in 2022. [REF1] However, the COVID-19 pandemic delayed progress along with new advances in cardiac surgery including minimally invasive techniques. In January 2025, the Province of Ontario announced $93 million in funding to build the Cardiovascular Surgery Program including a new wing on the Health Sciences Centre. During the announcement, hospital officials gave the new opening date of “late 2027”. Construction on the new Cardiovascular Surgery (CVS) Program began March 2025. Our Hearts at Home Campaign donors helped fund construction and outfitting including: • 14-bed Cardiovascular Surgical Unit (CVSU) • 6-bed Coronary Care Unit (CCU) with 1 procedure bed • Expanded existing OR for cardiac cases • New operating room for vascular surgery • Cardiovascular Ambulatory Care facility for pre-admissions and post-procedure care • Perfusion Workroom • Surgeon's Case Review Area Support for the Foundation’s campaign also came from the local business community in Thunder Bay. For example, Bay Village Coffee donates all proceeds from its annual heart-shaped butter cream cookies in February to the Our Hearts at Home Campaign. Many community-driven campaigns raise money for local cardiovascular care including during Heart Month in February. The Our Hearts at Home Campaign for Cardiovascular Surgery is ongoing as of May 2026.

=== Exceptional Cancer Care ===
The Exceptional Cancer Care (ECC) Campaign launched in October 2013 to raise $5.9 million. Paul Fitzpatrick, the ECC campaign chair, stated at the campaign’s launch that the goal was to “help (North West) Regional Cancer Care become the best centre in the province”. The campaign focused on three critical areas of cancer care: diagnosis, treatment, and research. In April 2015, Fitzpatrick announced that the campaign had exceeded their goal raising over $7 million in 18 months. As a result of those donations, “patients now have access to the integrated cancer screening coach, two linear accelerators, 13 new chemotherapy chairs, cyclotron, MicroPET scanner, and surgical oncology equipment”. The cyclotron in particular is a key piece of equipment for nuclear medicine, providing a reliable local source of Fluorodeoxyglucose (18F) (18F FDG) and other radioisotopes for diagnostic imaging and research. Previously, the Thunder Bay Regional Health Sciences Centre and the Thunder Bay Regional Health Research Institute relied upon radioisotopes delivered from Hamilton, Ontario, travelling several hours to arrive in Thunder Bay. Because of the short half-life of 18F FDG, patients often had their scans cancelled due to weather or other delays in shipment. This had a huge impact on patients and patient care, particularly for those patients who had to drive in from the surrounding region.

=== Save a Heart ===
The Save a Heart Campaign launched with a goal of raising $2.7 million “to help purchase the new imaging equipment for the Cardiac Catheterization Lab and the new MRI for Diagnostic Imaging”. The campaign helped bring angioplasty services to Thunder Bay in 2007 in a dedicated cath lab. A second cath lab opened in 2011. Soon after the campaign reached its goal, the Foundation launched the Northern Cancer Fund to support world-class cancer care in Northwestern Ontario.

=== Care Beyond Compare ===
In the mid- to late-1990s, the City of Thunder Bay and the Ministry of Health (Ontario) differed in opinion about a new hospital for the city. Thunder Bay officials including hospital officials wanted to build a new hospital on a site central to the large layout of the city. Provincial officials wanted to renovate one of the two hospitals, McKellar Hospital in Fort William or Port Arthur General Hospital in Port Arthur. The Care Beyond Compare Campaign chaired by Don Wing raised $19 million towards the construction of a new hospital. The Thunder Bay Regional Health Sciences Centre opened on February 22, 2004.

== The Family CARE Grant Program ==
The Family CARE (“Care Advancement Recommended by Employees”) Grant Program empowers front-line staff at the Thunder Bay Regional Health Sciences Centre to make a difference by providing up to $4,000 in funding for projects that will improve patient care. The program is described as “a workplace suggestion box, but with funding to bring ideas to life”.

In 2025, the program funded almost $140,000 for 74 projects at the Thunder Bay Regional Health Sciences Centre. Projects included a new Ring Rescue tool to remove rings from swollen or injured fingers (as seen on The Pitt), new infant simulators for paramedics to train and practice rare medical emergencies, traditional Indigenous medicines for smudging ceremonies, and a new, more comfortable mammogram gown.

In 2026, 100% of Family CARE Grant applications was funded totally a record $126,983.

== History ==
On April 1, 1995, McKellar General Hospital in Fort William and the Port Arthur General Hospital merged to become the Thunder Bay Regional Hospital. The McKellar Hospital Foundation and the foundation at the Port Arthur General Hospital followed suit in July 1996 to form the Thunder Bay Regional Hospital Foundation. This merger more closely aligned the goals of the foundations with hospital’s new administrative structure. The largest fundraising campaign was the “Care Beyond Compare” campaign, which raised $16.6 million for the construction of the new Thunder Bay Regional Health Sciences Centre.

The Thunder Bay Regional Health Sciences Foundation was founded on April 1, 2008 by amalgamating the Thunder Bay Regional Hospital Foundation with the former Northern Ontario Cancer Foundation – North Western Ontario Region (NCRF). The name change once again reflected the name of the hospital.

In January 2021, the Foundation launched the Thunder Bay 50/50 Draw as a way to raise funds during the COVID-19 pandemic.

The Foundation announced its largest funding commitment in its history in November 2025, approving a record $22.8 million for various Health Sciences Centre projects including $9.3 million for the new Cardiovascular Surgery (CVS) Program. The organization in its current form had raised $81 million to that point.
