= Thunder Bay Public Library =

System in Ontario, Canada

Coordinates: 48.38165°N 89.24633°W

- Location: Thunder Bay, Ontario
- Established: 1970
- Branches: 4

Collection
- Items collected: business directories, phone books, maps, government publications, books, periodicals, genealogy, local history,

Access and use
- Circulation: 941,526 (2006)
- Population served: 110,000

Other information
- Budget: $6.5 million (2019)
- CEO: Richard Togman
- Head Librarian: Ruth Hamlin-Douglas
- Employees: 55 full time 67 part time
- Website: http://www.tbpl.ca/

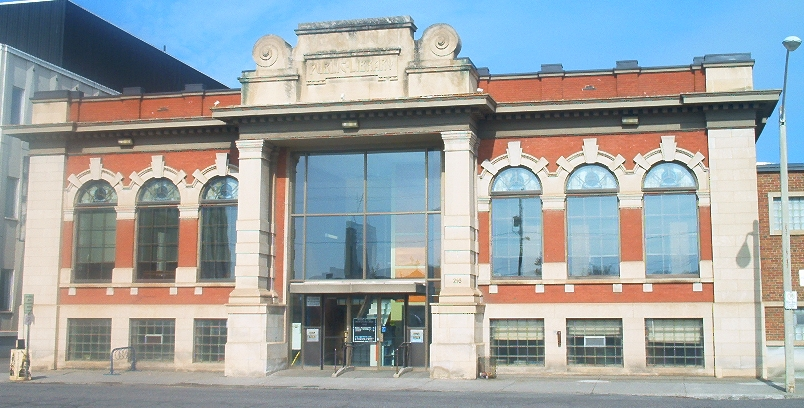
Brodie Street Library

The Thunder Bay Public Library serves the citizens of Thunder Bay, Ontario, Canada and surrounding areas.

== Services ==
- Information and reference services
- Access to full text databases
- Community information
- Internet access
- Reader's advisory services
- Programs for children, youth and adults
- Delivery to homebound individuals
- Interlibrary loan
- Free downloadable audiobooks

== History ==
=== Bookmobile ===
The Thunder Bay Public Library purchased a bookmobile in 1976 in order to provide decentralized library service to the amalgamated city's suburbs and rural areas. The bookmobile began its service in November 1976. Within its first year, it doubled its number of stops; by the fall of 1977 its schedule included eighteen different stops. Due to budget cutbacks, the bookmobile service was stopped in 1986. The library sold the bookmobile in 1986.

=== Branches ===
==== Former branches ====
The Thunder Bay Public Library opened a branch in Victoriaville Mall in 1981. The Victoriaville Branch Library housed the fiction collection from the Brodie Resource Library. A 1977 study determined that a larger library was needed in Thunder Bay South, but because Brodie was found to be a historic building, they decided to split its collection with a satellite branch; Brodie became the south end reference and resource branch. Victoriaville Branch Library remained open until May 14, 1995, the year the library opened a branch in the County Fair Mall; at that time, the fiction collection that was housed in Victoriaville was reintegrated into the Brodie Resource Library. A farewell tea for the branch was held on Friday, May 12.

==== Brodie Research Library ====
The Brodie Resource Library began as the Fort William Public Library, which opened on April 29, 1912. Renovations to the Brodie Resource Library for fiction reintegration began on April 10, 1995. A new Children's Department and adult fiction area were created during that time. The new areas opened to the public in June 1995. On February 27, 1982, the city's Local Architectural Conservation Advisory Committee (LACAC) designated the Brodie Street Library as a historically significant building. The Brodie Resource Library has since been renamed the Brodie Community Hub to keep with the Thunder Bay Public Library's move towards a community hub system of librarianship.

==== County Park Community Hub ====
On December 9, 1995, the County Park Branch Library, located in County Fair Mall, opened its doors after much public interest from local area residents (the need for a library in this area of the city was identified in facility studies conducted in 1977 and 1987). The population shift to this area of the city and the outlying region meant the library had to rethink service points and access for the citizens; subsequently, this location has remained very busy since its inception.

==== Mary J. L. Black Community Hub ====
The original Mary J. L. Black branch was created as part of the Fort William Public Library (now amalgamated as part of the Thunder Bay Public Libraries) in the Westfort district of Fort William. The branch opened on January 15, 1932. The Mary J. L. Black branch is named after the first librarian of the Fort William Public Library, Mary J. L. Black. The new Mary J. L. Black Community Hub has been located at 901 Edward St South in southern Thunder Bay since its opening in 2011.

==== Waverley Community Hub ====
The Waverley Community Hub, located at 285 Red River Road, was constructed in 1951 and expanded in 1973. In 2017, the Thunder Bay Public Libraries began the Waverley Renewal Project, seeking over five million dollars for renovations to the Waverley Branch with plans to begin renovating in 2019.

=== Technology ===
After the designation of the Brodie Street Library as a historically significant building, work focused on the automation project, which was installed in 1986. The GEAC online circulation system was launched in June 1986, and in 1994, the library upgraded its automation system to the GEAC Advance system. The GEAC system was replaced in 2005 with Innovative Interfaces Inc.'s Millennium Library system. Millennium Library system was replaced in the fall of 2016 with Innovative Interfaces Inc.' Sierra Integrated Library System.

In 1995, the Thunder Bay Public Library launched the first phase of their self-service options with a self-check unit. At Waverley, the unit had 17, 121 people use it in 1995, signing out more than 45,000 items. 1995 also saw the library's acquisition of the first multimedia CD ROM encyclopedias, internet access for staff (established through a sponsorship from Foxnet, a local internet service provider), and the launch of an online version of the Thunder Bay Index (established through the sponsorship of The Chronicle-Journal).

In late 1995, additional multimedia CD-ROM products were made available for in-library public use. Through close cooperation with Tamarack Technology (a local computer company), a CD-ROM Manager system was developed and a 14-drive CD-ROM Network server was installed at the Waverley branch. This system was well-used and a second CD-ROM Network server system was eventually installed at the Brodie branch.

Thunder Bay Public Library's first website went live on October 11, 1996. The URL back then was www.tbpl.thunder-bay. on.ca, the current URL (tbpl.ca) is much easier to remember. Here's an archived copy of the website from February 11, 1998.

The Thunder Bay Public Library launched Encore as its new online catalogue in the spring of 2018.

=== 2026 Strike ===
Library workers from all four branches went on strike after a period of difficult contract negotiations on October 15, 2026. Striking workers are represented by CUPE 3120 (library workers) and CUPE 87 (librarians.)

== See also ==
- Public libraries in Ontario
- Ask Ontario
