= Canadian Urban Transit Association =

Canadian trade association

- Association canadienne du transport urbain
- Abbreviation: CUTA / ACTU
- Founded: December 1904; 121 years ago in Montreal, Quebec
- Type: Trade association
- Headquarters: Toronto, Ontario
- Location: Ottawa, Ontario
- Members: 500+
- Official language: English, French
- President & CEO: Marco D'Angelo
- Chair: Alain Mercier, Réseau de transport de la Capitale
- First Vice Chair: James McDonald, Saskatoon Transit
- Immediate Past Chair: Doug Morgan, Calgary Transit
- Key people: Vice Chair - Finance: Pat Delmore, Transit Windsor; Vice Chair - Communications & Public Affairs: Kevin Desmond, TransLink; Vice Chair - Technical Services: Dave Reage, Halifax Transit; Vice Chair - Workforce Development: Kelly Paleczny, London Transit Commission; Vice Chair - Business Members: Jennifer McNeill, New Flyer Industries; Vice Chair - Business Members: Bruce McCuaig, AECOM Canada Ltd.; Vice Chair - Municipal Councils: Wes Brodhead, City of St. Albert; Honorary Counsel: Brian Leck, Toronto Transit Commission
- Website: cutaactu.ca
- Formerly called: Canadian Street Railway Association; Canadian Transit Association

The Canadian Urban Transit Association (CUTA) is a national association for urban mobility and both the public and private transit industries in Canada. It represents the country's transit agencies and additional third-party stakeholders at both the federal and provincial/territorial levels, as well as advocates more broadly for sustainable urban mobility, conducts policy research pertaining to the industry, and produces thought leadership on urban transit in North America.

== History ==
In December 1904, a group of officials from six street railway companies formed the Canadian Street Railway Association. It was renamed the Canadian Transit Association in 1932. After several name changes, the Canadian Urban Transit Association (CUTA) was adopted in 1973.

Initially membership was restricted to privately owned systems, however the rapid development of the bus and its use by founding members, promoted changes to the Association's constitution. In 1920, municipally owned systems were welcomed along with non-operating members such as suppliers.

Many issues discussed by CUTA's predecessors remain in discussion today such as traffic congestion, competition by the private automobile, vehicle design, transit marketing, relations with and regulation by government, and transit priority. New to the agenda in recent decades are the matters of achieving sustainable funding.

CUTA has defended the industry and actively promoted public transit across Canada. More recently, it has assisted government by laying the foundations of major transit funding programs. Since its foundation, Association members have benefited from CUTA's resources and training expertise.

To mark the centennial of the Canadian Urban Transit Association in 2004, CUTA prepared a publication to document the many activities, achievements and challenges facing public transit systems since that 1904 winter day in Montreal when the association was born. A Century of Moving Canada is the name of this publication.

Membership has grown to over 500 members, including 120 transit systems, 280 manufacturers, suppliers and other businesses, as well as numerous affiliates and government agencies.

== Activities ==
CUTA's main office is located in Toronto, with a public affairs office in Ottawa. CUTA's ongoing activities and services are divided into six program areas, designed to serve the key requirements of the association's transit system, business, government and affiliate members. Where appropriate, these areas are linked to CUTA's National Committees, which are intended to serve in an ongoing advisory capacity:

- Government Relations and Public Affairs
- Communications
- Technical Services
- Education and Training
- Administrative and Financial Support
- Association Governance

CUTA has five regional and five national committees. The Regional Committees comprise Atlantic, Quebec, Ontario, Prairies and Territories, and British Columbia provinces. They meet periodically for information sharing on issues of mutual interest. The national committees are Business Members, Communication and Public Affairs, Human Resources, Technical Services and Transit Board Members. These committees are being aligned with Transit Vision 2040 in order to proactively address the six themes contained in the Report.

The purpose of the Business Members Committee is to represent the interests of all Business Members relating to the policies and direction of the Association.

The Communications and Public Affairs Committee communicates messages to all stakeholders about the important role of transit in a sustainable transportation system. This committee also oversees CUTA advocacy and government relations activities and has a sub-committee responsible for conference planning.

The Human Resources Committee provides a forum to assist CUTA members in promoting Human Resource best practices within their systems through research, training and information exchange. A sub-committee manages the CUTA National Recognition Awards Program.

The purpose of the Technical Services Committee is to promote the effectiveness of public transit and to encourage best practices in the industry by way of research and development and through the exchange of information in the areas of operations, planning, bus design and maintenance. There are sub-committees representing vehicle technology, standards and maintenance; planning and ITS; statistics; and accessible transit.

The purpose of the Transit Board Members Committee is to provide a forum for exchange and promoting public transit among municipal decision-makers, identify current and emerging municipal issues of concern to the industry and provide assistance in resolving them, as well as to raise awareness and promote the use of CUTA activities and transit best practices throughout the municipal sector.

== Transit Vision 2040 ==
In 2009, CUTA embarked on an initiative that involves the development of an industry vision, framing a comprehensive definition of the role of public transit in Canada for a 30-year time horizon. Transit Vision 2040 communicates transit's contribution to quality of life, the nature of change likely to take place in Canadian communities by 2040, the implications these changes will have on transit, and strategic directions for actions that can maximize transit's contribution to overall quality of life.

Transit Vision 2040 is about putting transit at the center of communities, expansion and innovation, focusing on customers, accelerating the delivery of integrated transit services, improving the ecological footprint of transit services, ensuring financial health, and strengthening knowledge and practice so that Canada's transit industry can more effectively respond to future opportunities and challenges.

This Vision takes a long-term view, but it is intended to guide concrete short-term actions by CUTA, its members and other stakeholders. The Vision has particular relevance for transit agencies and can serve as a framework for strategic planning efforts by individual systems.

== See also ==
- Public transport in Canada
