= Intercity Shopping Centre =

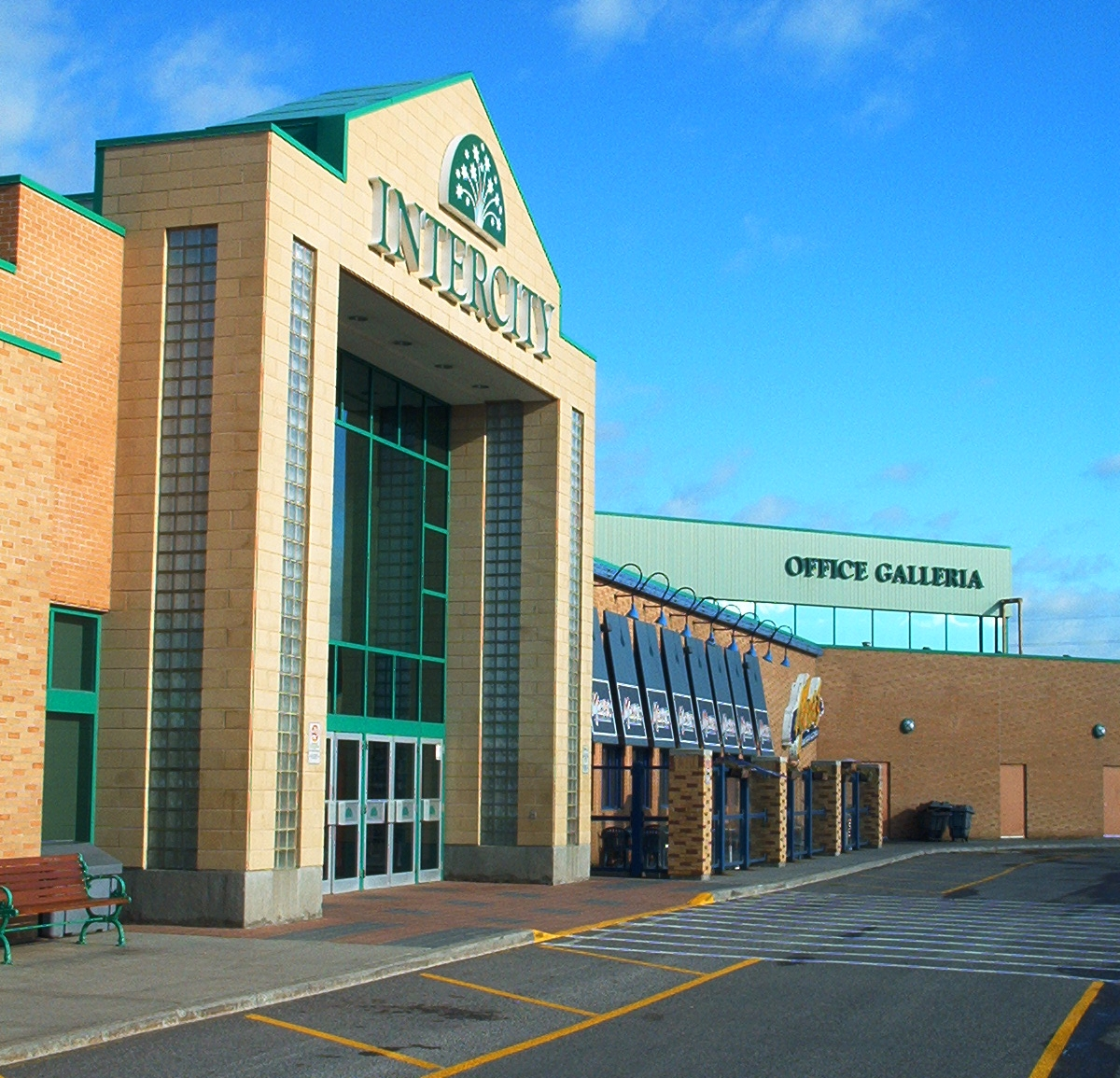
- An entrance to the mall
- Location: Thunder Bay, Ontario, Canada
- Coordinates: 48°24′12″N 89°14′38″W
- Address: 1000 Fort William Road
- Opened: 1982 (Strip mall); 1990s (Shopping Mall)
- Manager: Morguard
- Owner: Healthcare of Ontario Pension Plan
- Num. of stores: 102
- Num. of anchor tenants: 6
- Floor area: 456,430 square feet (42,404 m^{2})
- Floors: 2
- Parking: 2,226 stalls
- Public transit: Thunder Bay Transit; 1 3M 8 12 15
- Website: intercityshoppingcentre.com

Intercity Shopping Centre is a shopping mall in Thunder Bay, Ontario, Canada. It was one of the first shopping malls in Thunder Bay and is the largest of its kind in Northwestern Ontario, with 456,430 square feet (42,404 m^{2}) of retail space.

Originally, Intercity was built as a strip mall in 1982. However, in the 1990s, the entire Intercity site was redesigned. The strip mall was demolished and a more modern mall was constructed. Since then, the mall has seen various anchor stores and changes over the years. Today, it is Thunder Bay’s dominant shopping mall.

== Description ==
The mall is located in the middle of Thunder Bay, in the heart of the Intercity Neighbourhood. The mall is surrounded by the Harbour Expressway to the North, Fort William Road on the east, Isabel Street to the south, and Memorial Avenue to the west. By the main entrance, Thunder Bay Transit has a 2-platform bus hub, served by routes 1, 3M, 8, 12, and 15 when the mall is open.

The mall is home to dozens of shops. Shops range from clothing shops, to hair salons, to electronic shops, and more. The main entrance (on Fort William Road) leads to the food court on the south side of the mall. In addition, there is a second floor on the north side of the mall. This second floor is called the Office Galleria, and is home to several offices situated within the mall.

=== Anchor Stores ===
Today, there are 6 anchor stores within Intercity Shopping Centre. Most of them are at the south end of the mall. At the very south, is Dollarama. It has two entrances: one from Isabel Street, and the other from the mall. The southwest corner has Urban Planet, which can only be accessed by the mall and Fit4Less only accessible from outside. The west side of the mall is home to Sportchek, the only original anchor store remaining. It can be accessed from Memorial Avenue, or from the mall’s food court. At the very north, is Marshalls, accessible from the mall or Fort William Road.

The southernmost anchor store was originally Zellers from the opening of Intercity Mall until January 2013, when Zellers closed permanently. Renovations to this part of the mall began immediately, and a new Target store opened on 16 July 2013. Zellers and Target, both also had a third entrance at the corner of Memorial Avenue and Isabel Street. Like most Target stores in Canada, the Intercity location closed on 1 April 2015. In August 2016, Lowe's had renovated this spot in the mall and was one of the mall's anchor for several years. This location of Lowe’s had a garden centre on the west side of the store, and used the Memorial-Isabel entrance as their contractor’s entrance. In 2020, Lowe’s closed their Thunder Bay location and the south anchor was empty until Dollarama opened a store in the eastern half of the space in 2022. Thunder Bay Public Library had ideas on using the other half of the space to create a central library but the plans were abandoned. As of 2025, plans changed to split this anchor space into three anchor spaces. Dollarama relocated from the eastern (near Fort William Road) portion to the middle. Sport Chek will move from its current location to replace Dollarama in 2026. Finally, Fit4Less took the western portion the same year. (near Memorial Avenue), allowing the entire space to be occupied for the first time since 2020.

At the north end of the mall, Sears was the tenant of a 2-storey anchor store. They sold clothing and footwear on the lower level while furniture and home decor were sold on the upper level. Other than Thunder Bay Airport, Sears was the only other place in Thunder Bay to have escalators. There were three entrances, one from the mall, second from Fort William Road, and the third facing the Harbour Expressway. Finally, Sears Canada closed down in 2018, resulting in the closure of the Thunder Bay location too. Subsequently, Marshall’s moved into the space after renovations. However, Marshalls is only occupying a fraction of the first floor, leaving the second storey of Sears and the northernmost space from Sears abandoned.

The southwest anchor store formerly was HomeSense. It relocated to Thunder Centre on the opposite side of Fort William Road on 20 March 2018. Following their relocation, Urban Planet has been located in that space. Sport Chek, on the west side of the mall, is the only original anchor store that has not been changed until now. However, Sport Chek is planning to relocate to the site of Dollarama in Fall 2026.

=== Food Court ===
The main entrance (Entrance 1) on Fort William Road leads into a passage that leads to the food court. The food court leads to several fast food restaurants that serve the mall. They include:

- A&W
- Manchu Wok
- Subway
- Sam’s Kitchen
- Tim Hortons
- New York Fries

Rocky Mountain Chocolates is located on the north side of the mall instead. Freshly Squeezed used to be located in the centre of the food court but has since moved to a larger location in the middle of the mall.

The food court has a recycling and composting program. Instead of using garbage bins, all food waste is to be brought to a tray station in the centre. Customers bring their trash to the station and staff will sort recycling and compost and dispose of them sustainably.

== Thunder Bay Public Library ==
Thunder Bay Public Library has shown an interest in acquiring space from the former Lowe's space and making their central library. Currently, they have two main libraries located in the core of the two former cities of Port Arthur and Fort William. The creation of the Intercity library would see the consolidation of these libraries as the main library, leaving them to become neighbourhood branches, much like County Fair and Mary J.L. Black branches are today.

Despite getting zoning approval, the first idea failed to pass in 2024. Some minor modifications were made, leading to a second proposal in 2025. In the end, City Council voted against this proposal in April 2025. Instead, the Brodie, Waverley, and County Fair branches were expanded.
