= Thunder Bay Regional Health Sciences Centre =

- North West Local Health Integration Network

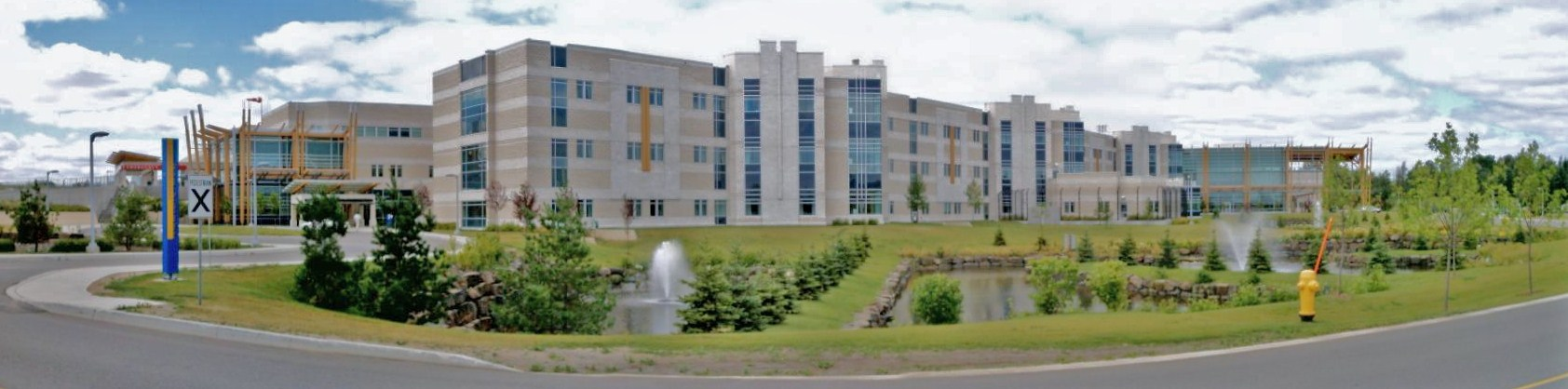
- Panorama of the hospital from the southeast

- Location in Ontario

Geography
- Location: 980 Oliver Road, Thunder Bay, Ontario, Canada
- Coordinates: 48.4244°N 89.2689°W

Organization
- Care system: Public Medicare (Canada) (OHIP)
- Type: General / Teaching (Group A)

Services
- Emergency department: Yes
- Beds: 395

Helipads
- Helipad: TC LID: CTB2

History
- Founded: 2004

Links
- Website: http://www.tbrhsc.net/
- Lists: Hospitals in Canada

Thunder Bay Regional Health Sciences Centre is an acute care facility serving Thunder Bay and much of Northwestern Ontario, Canada. The hospital has 395 acute care beds. All of its patient rooms are handicapped accessible and the facility is air-conditioned with "negative pressure" rooms to accommodate those who may be suffering from communicable diseases. The TBRHSC is a leader in providing cancer care. The hospital is supported by the Thunder Bay Regional Health Sciences Foundation.

Thunder Bay Regional Health Sciences Centre's emergency department is one of the busiest in Canada, receiving over 106,000 annual visits.

== History ==
Thunder Bay Regional Health Sciences Centre was created in 2004 as an amalgamation of the Port Arthur and McKellar branches of the Thunder Bay Regional Hospital system. Patients from both hospitals were relocated on February 22 and 23, 2004, at which time the name was changed to Thunder Bay Regional Health Sciences Centre.

In 2025, the construction of a new 76,000 square foot wing began. With this addition and renovations to the hospital, the hospital will introduce cardiovascular care. This expansion is expected to be completed 2027.

== Technology ==
Thunder Bay Regional Health Sciences Centre operates two linear accelerators, and offers training to new doctors on how to operate them. The centre's critical care unit, operating rooms and emergency department trauma rooms feature articulating arms, which allows physicians and caregivers to operate with greater ease. The centre has both hard-wired and Wireless technology, allowing its diagnostic imaging to use a picture archival system to record images from magnetic resonance imaging (MRI), CT scanners and other diagnostic imaging equipment which permits easier access to files among specialists so they may view and assess images as quickly as possible, and in any location necessary.

== The building ==
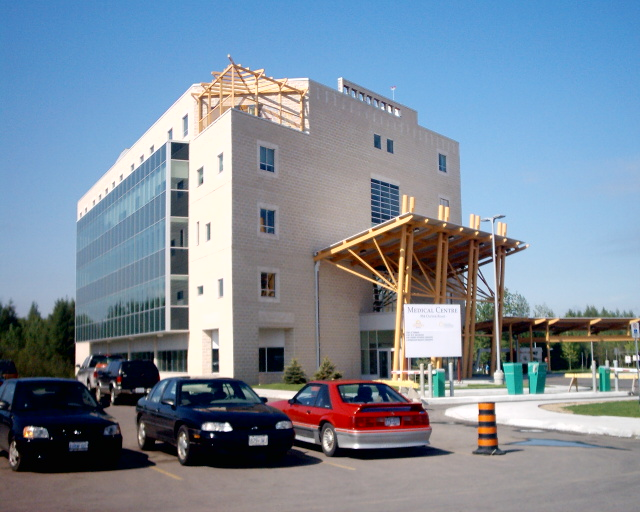
Medical Professional building

Thunder Bay Regional Health Sciences Centre is located at 980 Oliver Road, Thunder Bay, Ontario. The building was constructed between 1998 and February 2004. Its construction features a three-story atrium and one of the primary structural elements is wood, for which it won an award in 2004. When completed the building was over budget and several years late. This hospital is the only one in Thunder Bay.

The hospital is equipped with a ground level helipad located along Ron Saddington Way and short distance from the hospital building thus not requiring ambulance transfers.

The construction of a 76,000-square-foot expansion began in 2025 to support future cardiovascular care. It is expected to complete 2027.
