= List of convention and exhibition centers =

The following is a list of convention and exhibition centers by country.

== Andorra ==
- Andorra Convention Centre (Andorra la Vella)

== Argentina ==
=== Buenos Aires ===
- Buenos Aires Exhibition and Convention Center U/C
- Costa Salguero
- La Rural
- Sheraton Buenos Aires Hotel & Convention Center

=== Córdoba ===
- Córdoba Civic and Convention Center

=== Rosario, Santa Fe ===
- City Center Rosario
- Patio de la Madera

=== Salta ===
- Salta Convention Center

=== San Fernando del Valle de Catamarca, Catamarca ===
- Predio Ferial Campo Las Heras

=== Santiago del Estero ===
- Forum Santiago del Estero

== Australia ==
- Adelaide Convention Centre
- Brisbane Convention & Exhibition Centre
- Cairns Convention Centre
- Darwin Convention Centre
- Gold Coast Convention & Exhibition Centre
- International Convention Centre Sydney
- Melbourne Convention & Exhibition Centre
- Perth Convention & Exhibition Centre
- Royal Exhibition Building, Melbourne
- Royal International Convention Centre, part of the Brisbane Showgrounds

== Austria ==
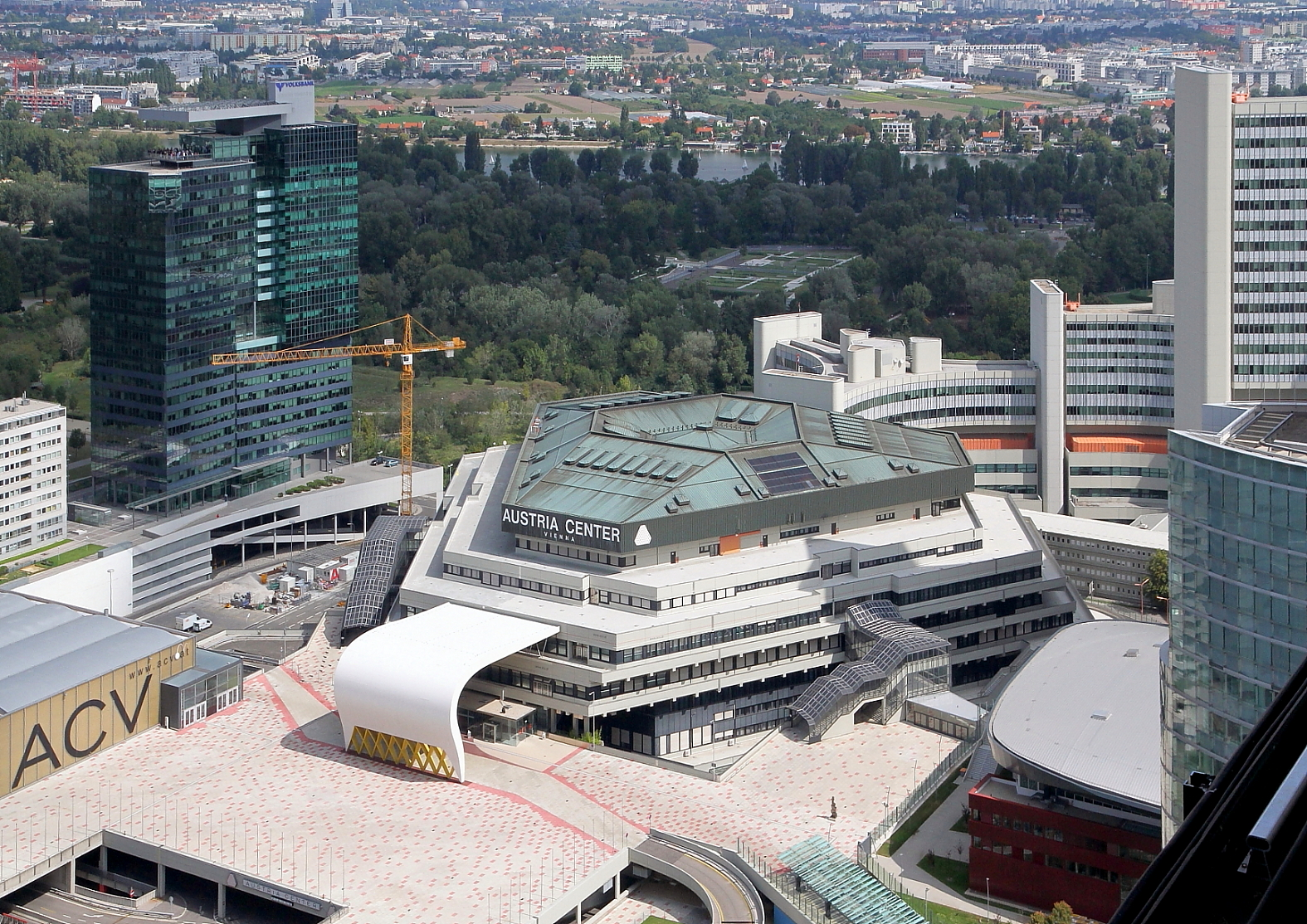
Austria Center Vienna

- Austria Center Vienna (part of Vienna International Centre)
- Hofburg Vienna
- Messe Wien
- Wiener Stadthalle

== Bangladesh ==
- International Convention City Bashundhara (ICCB)
- Bangladesh China Friendship Exhibition Center (BCFEC)
- Bangladesh-China Friendship Conference Center (BCFCC)

== Barbados ==
- Lloyd Erskine Sandiford Conference and Cultural Centre (formerly Sherbourne) (Two Mile Hill, St. Michael, Barbados)

== Belgium ==
- AFAS Dome
- Brussels Expo
- Flanders Expo
- Flanders Meeting & Convention Center Antwerp
- Grand Palais
- Kortrijk Xpo
- Liège Expo
- Mons Expo
- Namur Expo
- Park H
- Square – Brussels Meeting Centre
- Tour & Taxis

== Botswana ==
- Gaborone international convention center
- Peermont Walmont at the Grand Palm Hotel Casino and Convention Resort
- Cresta lodge
- AVANI Gaborone Resort & Casino
- Crossgold Conference
- Tlotlo hotel and conference center
- Phakalane Golf estate
- Ditshupo
- Gaborone fair grounds
- Botswana Investment and Trade Centre

== Brazil ==
- Anhembi Convention Center (São Paulo)
- Marista Hall (Belo Horizonte)
- Riocentro (Rio de Janeiro)
- WTC Events Center (São Paulo)

== Bulgaria ==
- National Palace of Culture (Sofia)
- Exhibition Forum Events (Sofia)

== China ==
=== Shanghai ===
- Shanghai Exhibition Centre
- Shanghai New International Expo Center
- Shanghai International Convention Center
- Shanghai Urban Planning Exhibition Center
- National Exhibition and Convention Center (Shanghai)

=== Beijing ===
- Beijing Exhibition Center
- China International Exhibition Center
- China National Convention Center

=== Other cities ===
- National Exhibition and Convention Center (Tianjin)
- New Century Global Center (Chengdu)
- Chenzhou International Convention and Exhibition Centre
- Guangzhou International Convention and Exhibition Center
- Hainan International Convention And Exhibition Center (Haikou)
- Harbin International Conference Exhibition and Sports Center
- Nanjing International Exhibition Center
- Shenyang New World Expo
- Shenzhen Convention and Exhibition Center
- Suzhou International Expo Center
- Convention and Exhibition Center (Tianjin)
- Xian Greenland Pico International Convention and Exhibition Center

== Colombia ==
- Centro de Convenciones de Cartagena de Indias
- Centro de Eventos Valle del Pacifico
- Corferias

== Croatia ==
- Zagreb Fair

== Czech Republic ==
- Brno Exhibition Centre (Brno)
- Výstaviště Praha

== Denmark ==
- Forum Copenhagen (Copenhagen)
- Bella Center (Copenhagen)
- Messecenter Herning (Herning)

== Finland ==
- Dipoli (Espoo)
- Helsinki Exhibition and Convention Centre
- Tampere Exhibition and Convention Centre
- Turku Exhibition and Convention Centre
- Wanha Satama (Helsinki)

== France ==
- Paris Expo Porte de Versailles
- Parc des Expositions de Villepinte
- Paris Event Center
- Palais des Congrès de Paris
- Palais des Congrès Acropolis (Nice)
- Palais des Festivals et des Congrès (Cannes)
- Strasbourg Convention & Exhibition Centre
- Center of New Industries and Technologies (CNIT) (Paris)
- Disney Business Solutions (Paris)
- Maison de la Mutualité (Paris)

== Georgia ==
=== Tbilisi ===
- ExpoGeorgia Co.

== Germany ==
=== Baden-Württemberg ===
- Stuttgart
  - Stuttgart Trade Fair

=== Bavaria ===
- Munich
  - Messe München
- Nürnberg (Nuremberg)
  - Messe Nürnberg

=== Berlin ===
- Berlin ExpoCenter Airport
- Internationales Congress Centrum Berlin (Charlottenburg-Wilmersdorf)
- Messe Berlin
- Palace of the Republic
- Berliner Congress Center

=== Hamburg ===
- Congress Center Hamburg
- Hamburg Messe

=== Hesse ===
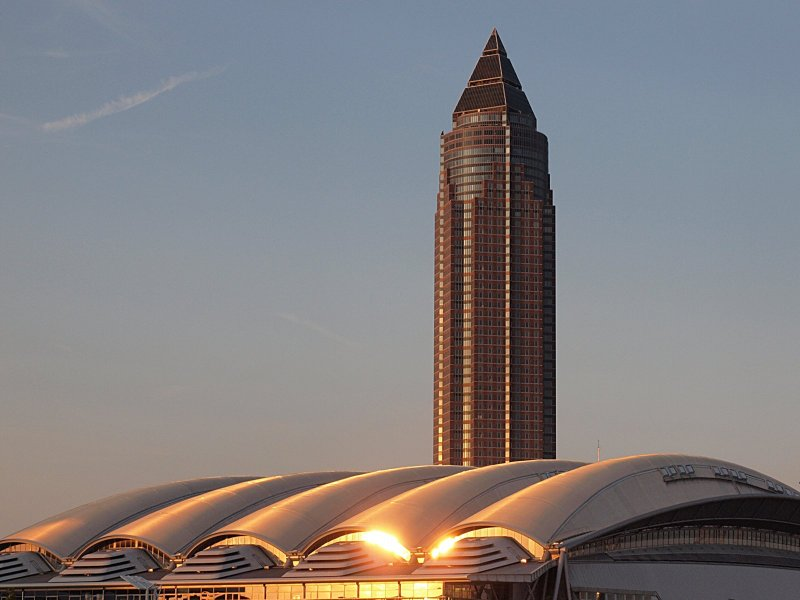
Hall 3 of Messe Frankfurt Trade Fair centre with Messeturm high rise building

- Frankfurt
  - Messe Frankfurt

=== Lower Saxony ===
- Hannover
  - Hanover Fairground

=== North Rhine-Westphalia ===
- Cologne (Köln)
  - Flora und Botanischer Garten Köln (Nippes, Cologne)
  - Gürzenich (Innenstadt, Cologne)
  - Koelnmesse – Cologne Trade Fair (Deutz, Cologne)
  - Lanxess Arena (Deutz)
  - Rheinterrassen (Deutz)
  - Staatenhaus (Deutz)
- Dortmund
  - Westfalenhallen
- Düsseldorf
  - Düsseldorf Congress Sport & Event (Stockum)
  - Messe Düsseldorf and Esprit Arena (Stockum)
  - Mitsubishi Electric Halle (Bilk)
  - Museum Kunstpalast (Pempelfort)
  - Station Airport (Lohausen)

Münster

- Halle Münsterland

=== Saxony ===
Leipzig

- Leipzig Trade Fair

== Ghana ==
- Pentecost Convention Centre

== Hong Kong SAR ==
- AsiaWorld–Expo (Chek Lap Kok)
- Hong Kong Convention and Exhibition Centre (Hong Kong Island)
- Kowloonbay International Trade & Exhibition Centre

== Hungary ==
- HUNGEXPO Budapest

== India ==
=== Delhi ===
- Bharat Mandapam, Pragati Maidan
- Yashobhoomi, Dwarka
- India Habitat Centre, Lodhi Colony
- NDMC Convention Centre, New Delhi
- Vigyan Bhavan, New Delhi
- Manekshaw Centre, Delhi Cantt
- NCUI Auditorium & Convention Centre, Hauz Khas

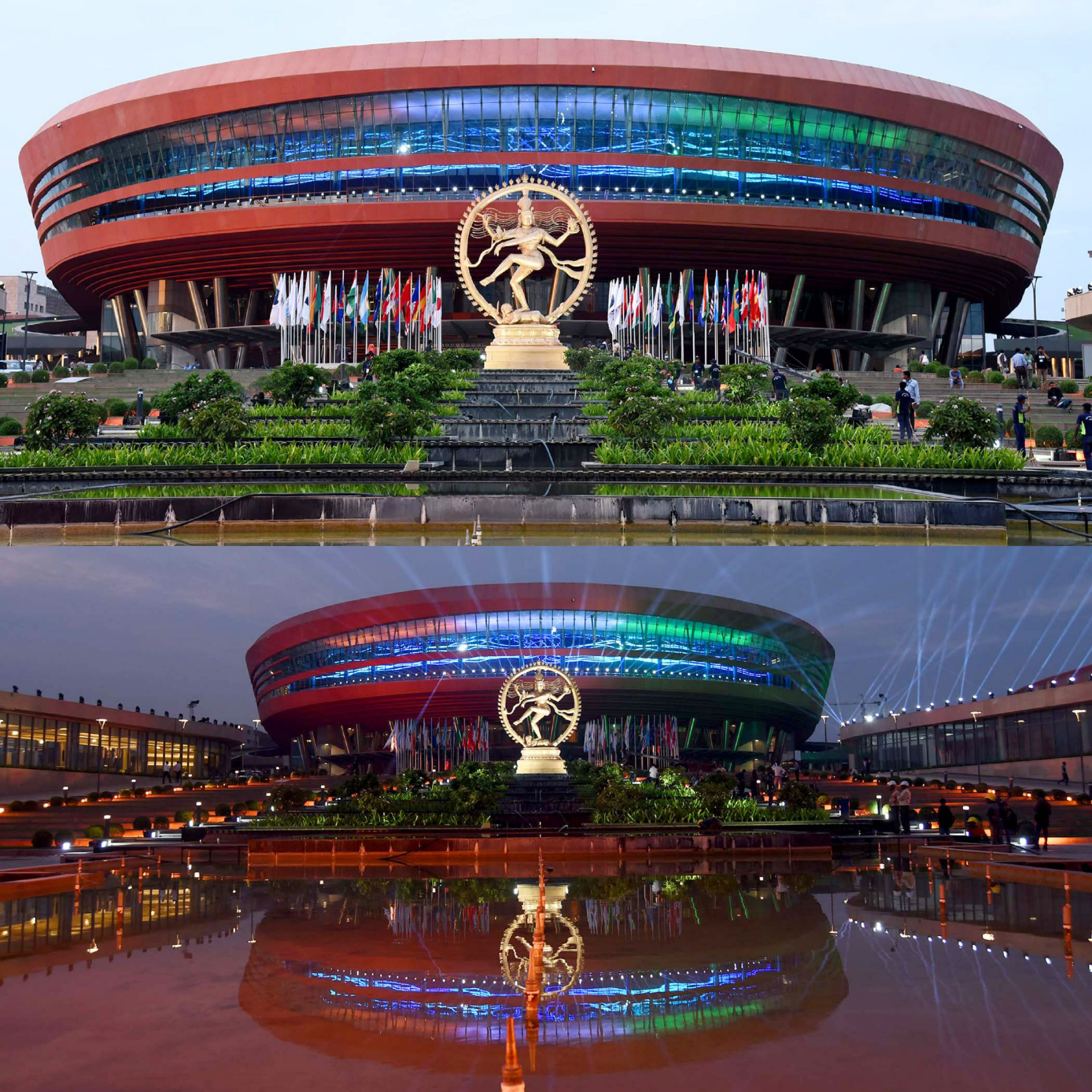
Bharat Mandapam Pragati Maidan

=== Andhra Pradesh ===
- Sree Convention Centre (Eluru)
- A1 Convention Centre (Vijayawada)
- 24K Golden Events Convention Centre (Vijayawada)
- Vizag Conventions (Visakhapatnam)
- AU Convention Center (Visakhapatnam)
- Kala Bharati (Visakhapatnam)

=== Bihar ===
- Patna International Convention Centre (Patna)
- Shri Krishna Memorial Hall (Patna)
- Rajgir International Convention Centre (Rajgir)

=== Gujarat ===
- Gujarat University Convention & Exhibition Centre, Managed By Lallooji & Sons (Ahmedabad)
- Mahatma Mandir (Gandhinagar)
- Shree Shakti Greens (Ahmedabad)
- Surat International Exhibition and Convention Centre (Surat)

=== Jammu and Kashmir ===
- University of Kashmir Convocation Complex (Srinagar)
- Sher-e-Kashmir International Convention Centre (Srinagar)
- General Zorawar Singh Auditorium (Jammu)

=== Karnataka ===
- Bangalore International Exhibition Centre (Bangalore)
- Bangalore Palace (Bangalore)
- TMA Pai International Convention Centre (Mangalore)
- The Leela Bhartiya City Bengaluru Convention Centre (Bangalore)

=== Kerala ===
- Camelot International Convention Centre, Alappuzha
- Adlux International Convention & Exhibition Centre, Kochi
- Ashis Convention Centre, Kalamassery Kochi
- Golden Palace International Convention Center (Largest in South India), Trivandrum
- LuLu Grand Hyatt International Convention Centre, Bolghatty Island Kochi
- Lulu Convention Centre, Thrissur
- Le Meridien International Convention Center, Kochi
- Gokulam Convention Centre, Kochi
- Crescent Convention Center, Chalakudy
- CIAL Trade Fair and Exhibition centre, Kochi
- MCP Convention Center, Irinjalakuda, Thrissur
- Cosmopolitan Convention Center, Kodungallur
- The Quilon Beach Hotel & Convention Centre, Kollam
- Travancore International Convention center
- Malabar Marina Convention Centre
- Al Saj Convention Centre (Trivandrum)
- International Conference Center (Thuravoor) (Kochi)
- Shifa Convention Center (Perinthalmanna, Malappuram)
- Vythiri Village Convention Center (Vythiri, Wayanad)
- Vijaya International Convention Center (Thiruvalla, Pathanamthitta)
- Mikas Convention Centre (Kayamkulam)
- K. G. Convention Centre (Punalur)
- Thiruvambady Convention Centre, Thrissur
- Centre-A, Business Centre (Kochi)
- The Quilon Beach Hotel & Convention Centre, Kollam
- GAGO Convention Centre (Kadakkal quilon)
- Pearl Convention Centre, Vadasserikkonam
- LA Mirage Convention Center, Koratty
- Trans Asia Cyber Park, Business Center (Kochi)

=== Madhya Pradesh ===
- Brilliant Convention Centre (Indore)

=== Maharashtra ===
- Jio World Convention Centre, Mumbai
- Bombay Convention & Exhibition Centre (Mumbai)
- International Convention Centre, Pune
- The Orchid Hotel and Convention Centre, Pune

=== National Capital Region (NCR) ===
- Annamalai University
- APICON 2015 – Conference Secretariat
- Awas Vikas Convention Center
- Bhaskaracharya College of Applied Sciences
- Centre for Linguistics
- Conference Venue
- Convention Center, JNU
- Design Public
- Epicentre
- The Executive Centre, Serviced Offices, Gurgaon, India
- Exhibition Cum Convention Centre
- Expocentre
- Habitat World
- Hilton Garden Inn, Gurgaon Baani Square
- The Icon Motel
- India Convention And Culture Center Pvt Ltd.
- India Expo Centre and Mart (Greater Noida)
- India Exposition Mart Ltd.
- India International Centre
- Inter-University Accelerator Centre
- Paharpur Business Centre
- Palika Sadan
- Petrotech
- The Phoolwari
- Pragati Maidan (New Delhi)
- Pratham Convention Centre (proposed)
- Ramada Gurgaon Central
- Royal Orchid Hotels
- Scope
- Shakuntalam Theatre
- Taurus Hotel & Conventions
- Tilyar Convention Center
- University of Delhi North Campus Conference Centre
- West End Convention Centre

=== Rajasthan ===
- Jaipur Exhibition and Convention Centre

=== Tamil Nadu ===
- PSG Convention Center, Coimbatore
- Chennai Trade Centre
- Codissia Trade Fair, Coimbatore; "Asia's Largest Pillar Free Hall"

=== Telangana ===
- Veda Convention Centre (Adibatla) (Hyderabad)
- HITEX Exhibition Center (Hyderabad)
- Hyderabad International Convention Centre (HICC) (Hyderabad)
- N Convention Centre, Hitec City (Hyderabad)
- J R C Convention Centre, Film Nagar, Jubilee Hills, (Hyderabad)

=== Uttarakhand ===
- Himalayan Cultural Centre (Dehradun)

=== West Bengal ===
- Biswa Bangla Convention Center, New Town (Kolkata)
- Milan Mela Prangan (Kolkata)
- Science City Convention Centre (Kolkata)
- ITC Convention Centre
- Dhanadhanya Auditorium, Kolkata

== Indonesia ==
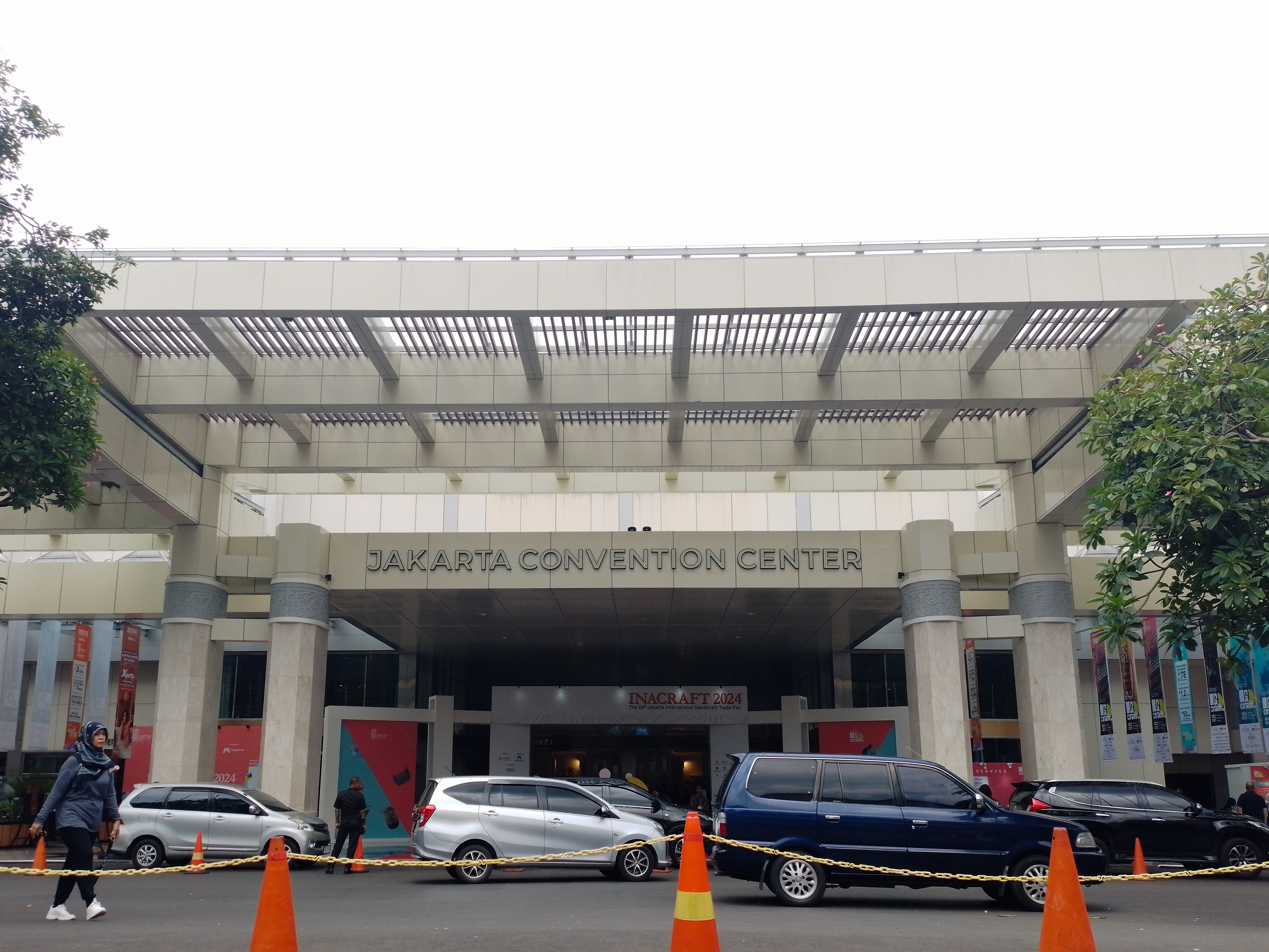
Jakarta International Convention Center

=== Bali ===
- Bali International Convention Center (Bali)

=== Banten ===
- Indonesia Convention Exhibition (BSD City, Tangerang Regency, Banten)
- Nusantara International Convention Exhibition (Pantai Indah Kapuk 2, Tangerang Regency, Banten)

=== East Java ===
- Dyandra Convention Center (Surabaya, East Java)
- Grand City Convention Center (Surabaya, East Java)

=== Jakarta ===
- Jakarta International Convention Center (Gelora, Central Jakarta)
- Jakarta International Expo (JIExpo) (Kemayoran, Central Jakarta)

=== North Sumatra ===
- Medan International Convention Center (Medan, North Sumatra)

=== Riau ===
- Labersa Grand Hotel and Convention Center (Pekanbaru, Riau)

=== West Kalimantan ===
- Balikpapan Sport & Convention Center (Balikpapan, East Kalimantan)

=== West Java ===
- Bandung Convention Center (Bandung, West Java)
- Sentul International Convention Center (Sentul City, Bogor Regency, West Java)

=== South Sulawesi ===
- Celebes Convention Center (Makassar, South Sulawesi)

=== South Sumatra ===
- Palembang Sport and Convention Center (Palembang, South Sumatra)

== Iran ==
- EXHIBIRAN INTERNATIONAL Shahr-e Aftab
- Kish International Conferences and Exhibitions Center
- Mashhad International Exhibition Center (Mashhad)
- Milad Tower
- Iran International Exhibitions Company, Tehran International Permanent Fairground
- IRIB International Conference Center
- Iran Mall exhibition center
- Isfahan Fair, Isfahan Province International Exhibition Co.
- Isfahan Imam Khamenei International Convention Center
- Isfahan City Center
- Tabriz International Exhibition Center, Tabriz

== Ireland ==
- Citywest Hotel & Conference Centre
- Convention Centre Dublin
- Royal Dublin Society
- ICC Belfast

== Israel ==
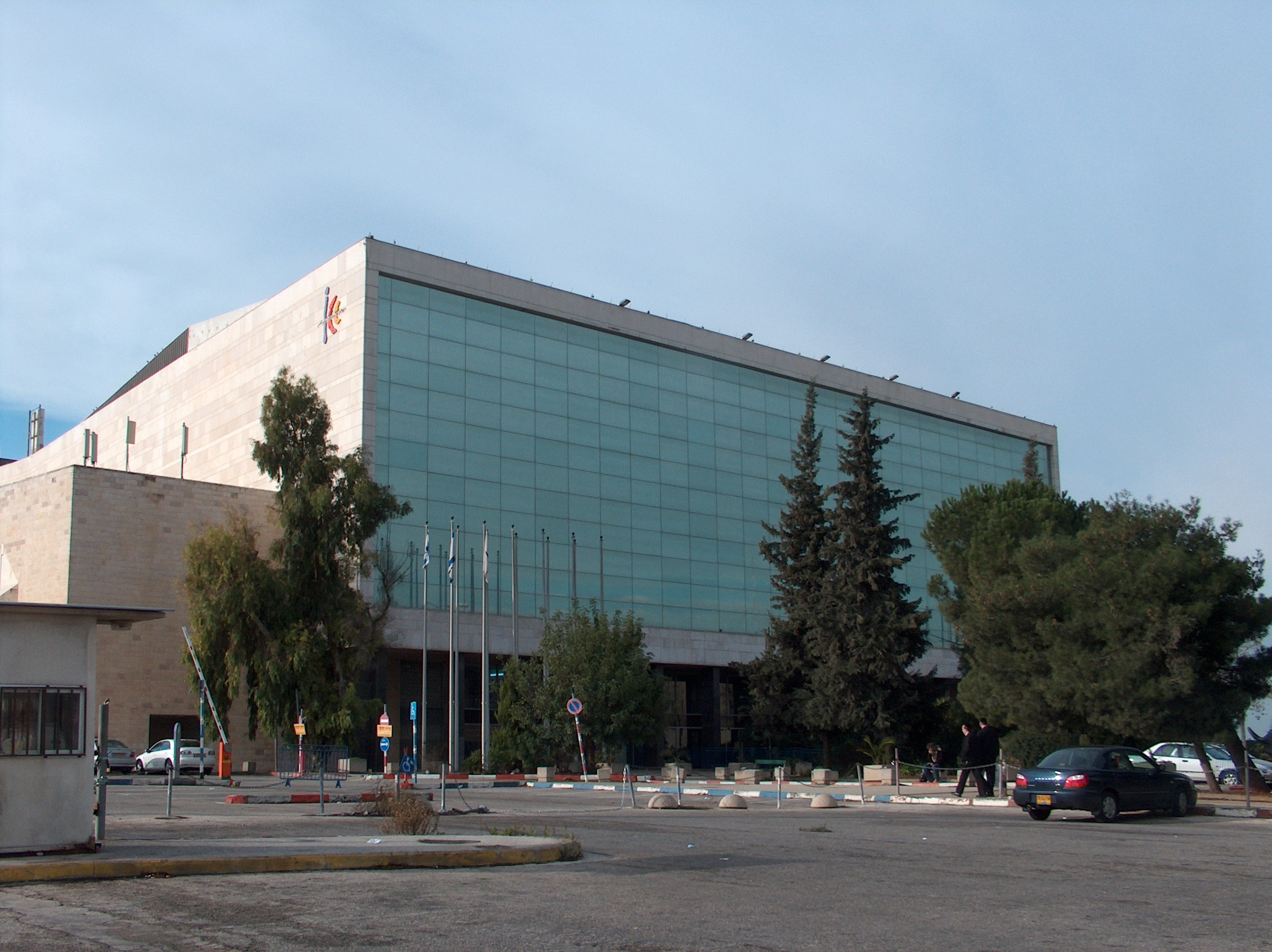
International Convention Center (Jerusalem)

- Haifa International Convention Center (Matam, Haifa)
- International Convention Center (Jerusalem)
- Israel Trade Fairs & Convention Center (Tel Aviv)

== Italy ==
- Palazzo delle Esposizioni (Rome)
- Nuovo Centro Congressi (Rome)
- Fiera di Roma (Rome)
- Palazzo dei Congressi (Rome)
- Torino Esposizioni (Turin)
- MiCo – Milano Congressi (Milan)
- Stella Polare Convention Centre, Fieramilano Rho (Milan)
- PalaExpo Venice (Venice)

== Jamaica ==
- Montego Bay Convention Centre (Montego Bay, Saint James)

== Japan ==
=== Aichi ===
- Nagoya Congress Center
- Nagoya International Exhibition Hall

=== Chiba ===
- Makuhari Messe

=== Fukuoka ===
- Fukuoka Convention Center
- Marine Messe Fukuoka

=== Gifu ===
- Nagaragawa Convention Center

=== Hokkaido ===
- Sapporo Convention Center
- Sapporo Ryūtsū Center

=== Kanagawa ===
- Pacifico Yokohama

=== Kyoto ===
- Kyoto International Conference Center

=== Niigata ===
- Toki Messe

=== Okinawa ===
- Okinawa Convention Center

=== Osaka ===
- Intex Osaka
- Osaka International Convention Center

=== Tokyo ===
- Tokyo Big Sight
- Tokyo International Forum

== Jordan ==
- King Hussein Bin Talal Convention Center

== Kenya ==
- Kenyatta International Conference Centre (Nairobi)

== Korea, South ==
- BEXCO Busan Exhibition and Convention Center (Busan)
- CECO Exhibition Convention Center (Changwon)
- COEX Convention & Exhibition Center (Seoul)
- EXCO Exhibition & Convention Center (Daegu)
- International Convention Center Jeju (Jeju Island)
- KDJC Kimdaejung Convention center (Gwangju)
- KINTEX Korea International Exhibition Center (Goyang)
- KOTREX Kotra Exhibition Center (Daejon)
- SETEC Seoul Trade Exhibition & Convention (Seoul)
- Songdo Convensia (Incheon)
- Ulsan Culture & Arts Center (Ulsan)

== Laos ==
- Lao International Trade Exhibition & Convention Center (Lao-ITECC) (Vientiane)
- Landmark Mekong Riverside Hotel & Convention Center, (Vientiane)

== Luxembourg ==
- Luxexpo The Box
- Cercle Municipal
- Kinneksbond
- Neimënster Abbey

== Malaysia ==
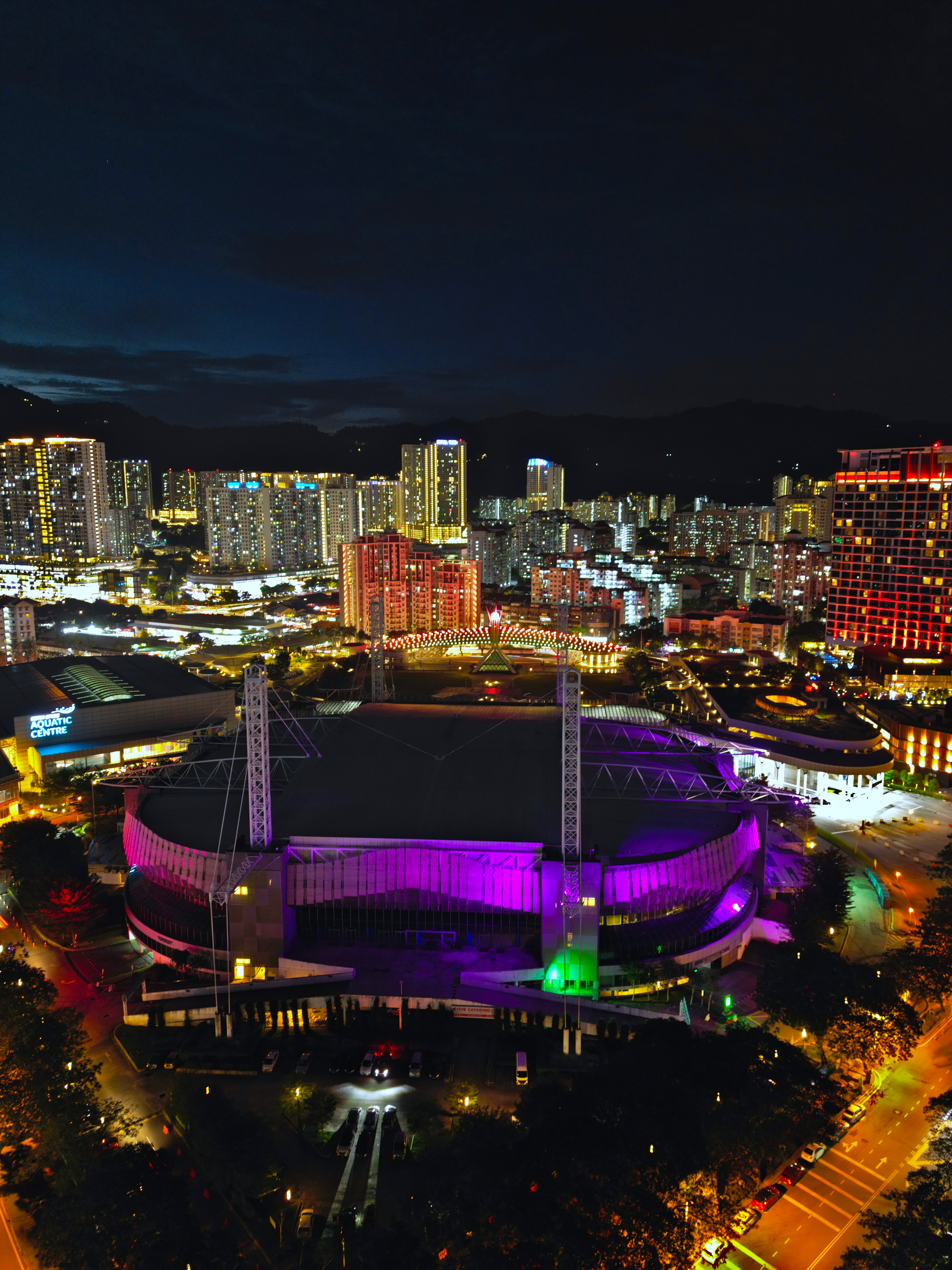
SPICE Arena in George Town, Penang

- Ataria International Convention Centre at Bukit Gambang Resort City, Kuantan, Pahang
- Ataria International Convention Centre, @ Borneo Samariang Resort City, Kuching, Sarawak
- Calvary Convention Centre
- Dewan Canselor Tun Abdul Razak
- Mines Exhibition Center (Sri Kembangan, Kuala Lumpur)
- Mid Valley Exhibition Centre
- Borneo Convention Centre Kuching
- Connexion@Nexus (Bangsar South, Kuala Lumpur)
- Kuala Lumpur Convention Centre
- SPICE Arena
- Penang Waterfront Convention Centre
- Malacca International Trade Centre
- Malaysia Agro Exposition Park Serdang
- Malaysia International Trade and Exhibition Centre (MITEC)
- MATRADE Exhibition and Convention Centre (MECC)
- Persada Johor
- Ipoh Convention Centre
- Putra World Trade Centre
- Putrajaya International Convention Centre
- Sabah International Convention Centre
- Setia City Convention Centre
- Shah Alam Convention Centre
- Ideal Convention Centre, Shah Alam

== Malta ==
- Mediterranean Conference Centre
- Malta Fairs & Conventions Centre

== Mauritius ==
- Swami Vivekananda International Convention Centre
- Trianon Convention Centre

== Mexico ==
- Auditorio Benito Juarez (Los Mochis)
- Centro de Convenciones de Tampico
- Centro de Convenciones y Exposiciones (Toluca)
- Cintermex (Monterrey)
- Expo Forum (Hermosillo)
- Inforum (Irapuato)
- Poliforum Chiapas
- Salon Teotihuacan (Acapulco)
- Yucatán Siglo XXI Convention Centre (Mérida, Yucatán)

== Monaco ==
- Grimaldi Forum

== Nepal ==
- International Convention Centre, Nepal, Kathmandu
- Godavari Sunrise Convention Center, Lalitpur
- Butwal International Conference Centre, Rupandehi
- The Blue Pavilion, Bhrikutimandap, Kathmandu
- Bhrikutimandap Exhibition Hall, Kathmandu
- Nepal International Convention and Expo Centre, Madhyapur Thimi, Bhaktapur
- The Plaza Grand Hall, Pulchowk, Lalitpur
- Lal Durbar Convention Center, Kathmandu
- Lumbini International Buddhist Conference and Meditation Hall, Lumbini

== Netherlands ==
- Amsterdam RAI Exhibition & Convention Center: 112,200 m^{2}
- Beurs van Berlage, Amsterdam: 18,000 m^{2} (up to 1300 delegates)
- Rotterdam Ahoy, Rotterdam

== New Zealand ==
- Aotea Centre (Auckland)
- Christchurch Convention Centre (demolished in 2012, due to earthquake damage)
- Claudelands Arena (Hamilton)
- Michael Fowler Centre (Wellington)
- Mystery Creek Events Centre (Hamilton)
- TSB Arena (Wellington)
- Viaduct Events Centre (Auckland)
- Tākina Wellington Convention and Exhibition Centre (Wellington)

== Nigeria ==
- Eko Convention Centre
- Calabar International Convention Centre
- Obi Wali International Conference Centre (Port Harcourt, Rivers State)

== Norway ==
- Telenor Arena (Oslo)
- Oslofjord Convention Center (Stokke)

== Pakistan ==
- Aiwan-e-Iqbal (Lahore)
- Expo Centre Lahore
- Jinnah Convention Centre (Islamabad)
- Karachi Expo Centre
- Pak-China Friendship Centre (Islamabad)

== Panama ==
- Atlapa Convention Centre
- Figali Convention Center

== Paraguay ==
- Centro de Convenciones y Museo de la CONMEBOL (Asunción)
- Centro de Convenciones Mariscal López (Asunción)

== Philippines ==
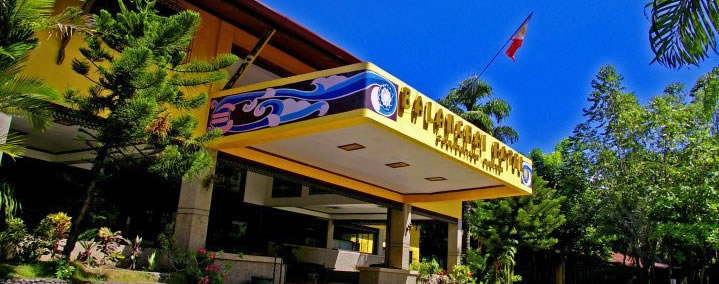
The Balanghai Hotel and Convention Center in Butuan

- ADD Convention Center (Apalit, Pampanga)
- Aquilino Q. Pimentel Jr. International Convention Center (Cagayan de Oro)
- Balanghai Hotel and Convention Center (Butuan)
- Boracay Convention Center (Malay, Aklan)
- Bren Z. Guiao Convention Center (San Fernando, Pampanga)
- CDO Downtown Event Hall (Cagayan de Oro)
- Cebu International Convention Center (Cebu City)
- IC3 Convention Center (Cebu City)
- Iloilo Convention Center (Iloilo City)
- Negros Oriental Convention Center (Dumaguete)
- Philippine International Convention Center (Pasay)
- Quezon Convention Center (Lucena, Quezon)
- SMX Convention Center Manila (Pasay)
- Megatrade Hall (Mandaluyong)
- SMX Convention Center Bacolod (Bacolod)
- SMX Convention Center Davao (Davao City)
- SMX Convention Center Aura (Taguig)
- Sky Hall (Cebu City)
- SMX Convention Center Olongapo (Olongapo)
- Space at One Ayala (Makati)
- Subic Bay Convention Center (Olongapo)
- Valenzuela City Convention Center (Valenzuela)
- World Trade Center Metro Manila (Pasay)

== Portugal ==
- Centro de Congressos da Alfândega do Porto / Alfândega Congress Centre (Porto)
- Altice Arena (Lisbon)
- Feira Internacional de Lisboa (Lisbon)
- Centro de Congressos de Lisboa (Lisbon)
- Centro de Congressos do Estoril (Estoril)
- Centro de Congressos do Algarve (Vilamoura, Quarteira)

== Puerto Rico ==
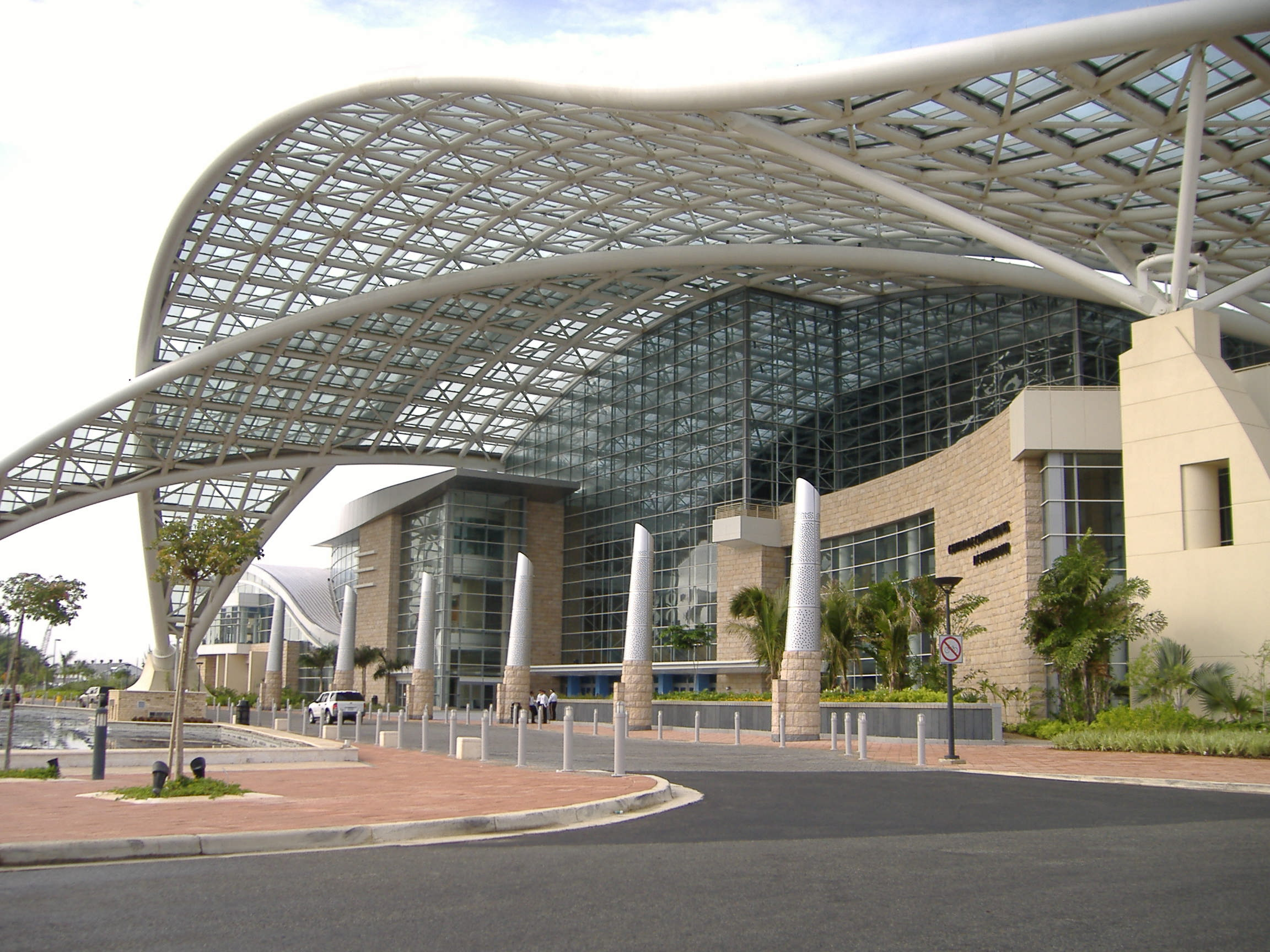
The Puerto Rico Convention Center (PRCC), in San Juan, Puerto Rico

== Romania ==
- Caex (Bacau)
- Centrul Expozitional Iasi (Iasi)
- Expo Arad (Arad)
- Pavilionul Expozitional Mamaia (Constanta)
- Romexpo (Bucharest)
- Sala Palatului (Bucharest)
- The Multifunctional Center (Craiova)

== Russia ==
- All-Russia Exhibition Centre (Moscow)
- Crocus Expo (Moscow)
- Expocentre (Moscow)
- Makaryev Fair Exhibition Hall (Nizhny Novgorod)
- Moscow Gostiny Dvor
- Moscow Manege
- Saint Petersburg Manege
- Sokolniki Exhibition and Convention Centre (Moscow)

== Rwanda ==
- Kigali Convention Centre (Kigali)

== Singapore ==
- Changi Exhibition Centre
- Marina Bay Sands Expo and Convention Centre
- MAX Atria
- Raffles City Convention Centre
- Singapore Conference Hall
- Singapore Expo
- The Star Theatre – The Star Performing Arts Centre
- Suntec Singapore International Convention and Exhibition Centre
- UE Convention Centre

== Slovenia ==
- Brdo Castle near Kranj
- Cankar Hall (Ljubljana)
- Exhibition and Convention Centre (Ljubljana)

== South Africa ==
- Cape Town International Convention Centre
  Cape Town International Convention Centre
- CSIR International Convention Centre (Pretoria)
- Johannesburg Expo Centre (Nasrec)
- Gallagher Convention Centre (Midrand)
- Inkosi Albert Luthuli International Convention Centre (Durban)
- Nelson Mandela International Convention Center (Bloemfontein)
- East London International Convention Centre (East London)

== Spain ==
- Palau de Congressos de Catalunya
- Centre de Convencions Internacional de Barcelona
- BEC - Bilbao Exhibition Centre
- Feria Valencia
- Fira de Barcelona
- La Llotja de Lleida
- Palacio de Congresos Kursaal (San Sebastián)
- World Trade Center Barcelona
- Feria de Zaragoza
- IFEMA

== Sri Lanka ==
- Bandaranaike Memorial International Conference Hall (Colombo)
- Sri Lanka Exhibition & Convention Centre (Colombo)
- Veerasingam Hall (Jaffna)

== Sweden ==
- Elmia (Jönköping)
- Malmömässan (Malmö)
- Norra Latin (Stockholm)
- Rosvalla Nyköping Eventcenter
- Stockholm International Fairs
- Stockholm Waterfront
- Svenska Mässan (Gothenburg)

== Switzerland ==
- Montreux Music & Convention Centre (Montreux)
- Congress Center Basel (Basel)
- Davos Congress Centre
- Eulachhalle (Winterthur)
- Palais de Beaulieu (Lausanne)
- Palexpo (Geneva)
- Swiss Convention Centres
- SwissTech Convention Center (Lausanne)

== Taiwan ==
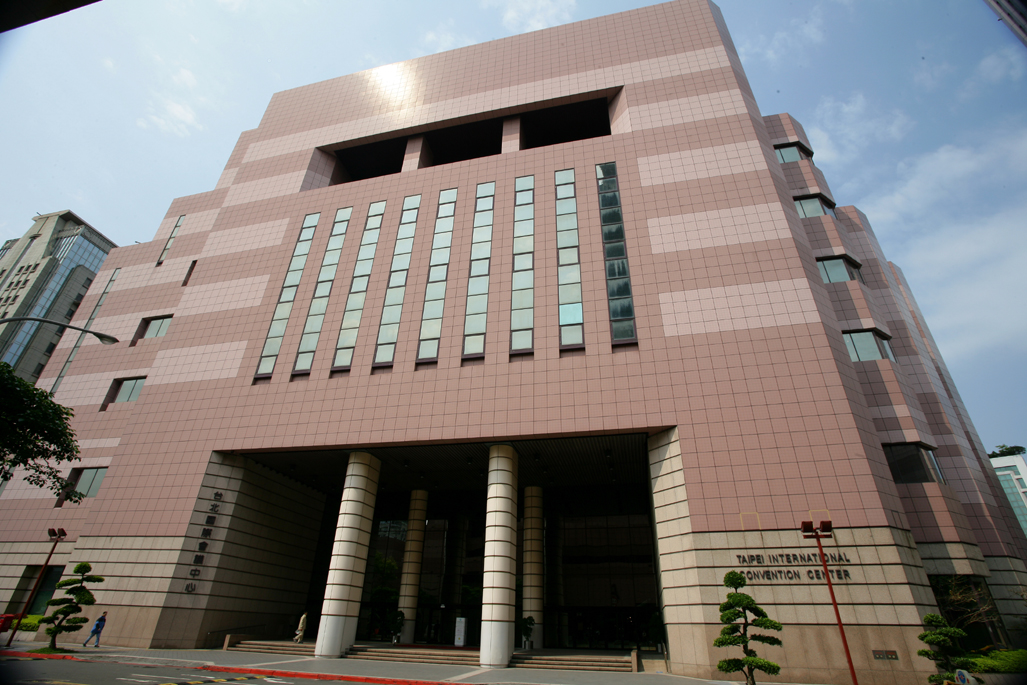
Taipei International Convention Center

- Greater Taichung International Expo Center
- ICC Tainan
- International Convention Center Kaohsiung
- Kaohsiung Exhibition Center
- New Taipei City Exhibition Hall
- Taipei International Convention Center
- Taipei Nangang Exhibition Center
- Taipei World Trade Center
- Taoyuan Convention and Exhibition Center
- World Trade Center Taichung

== Tanzania ==
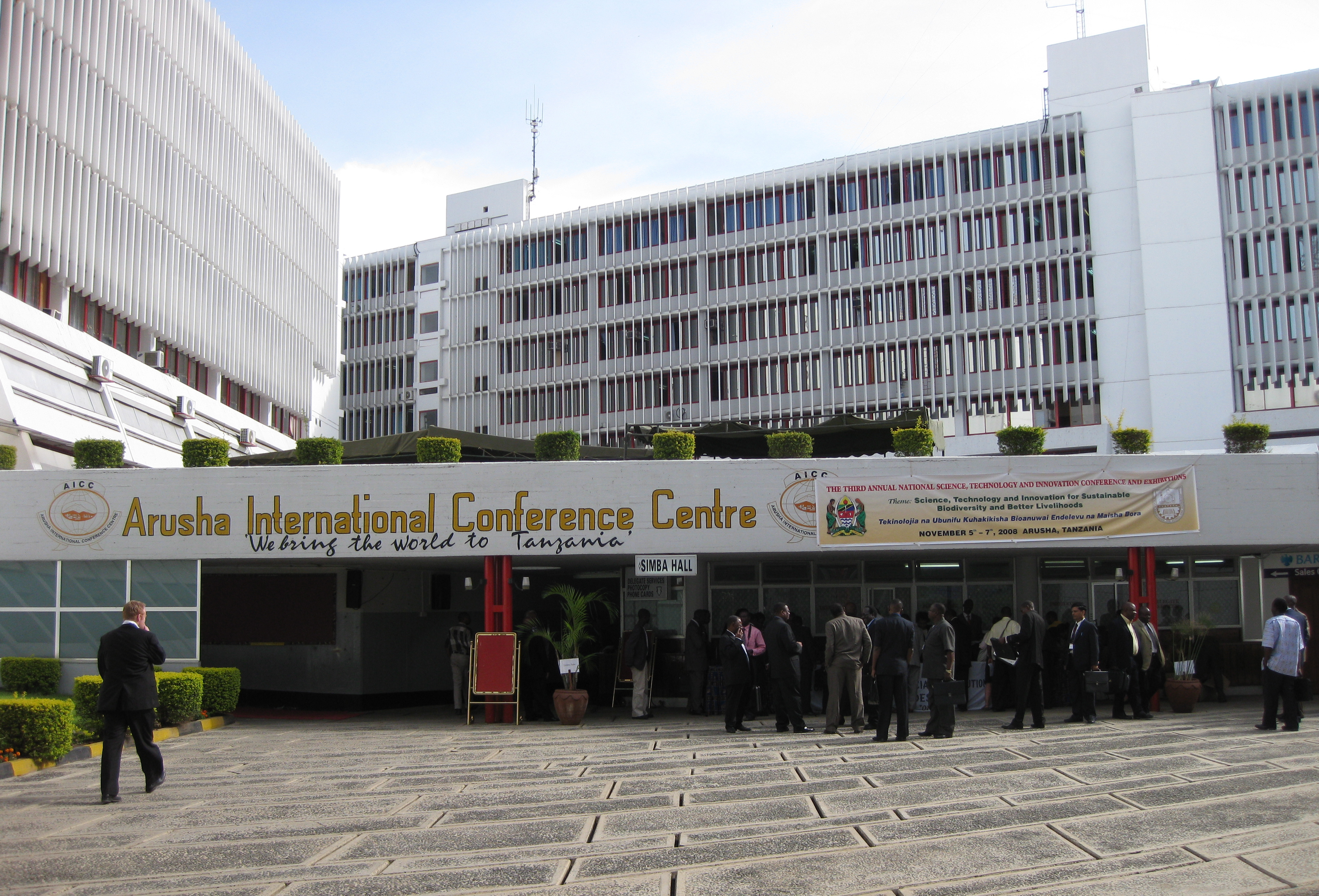
AICC

- Arusha International Conference Centre (Arusha)
- Dar es Salaam International Conference Centre (Dar es Salaam)
- Julius Nyerere International Convention Centre (Dar es Salaam)
- Tanga International Conference Centre (Tanga)

== Thailand ==
- Bangkok Convention Center Ladprao (CentralPlaza Lardprao, Bangkok)
- Bangkok International Trade and Exhibition Centre
- Centara Grand and Bangkok Convention Centre (CentralWorld, Bangkok)
- Chiang Mai International Exhibition and Convention Centre (Chiang Mai)
- Impact, Muang Thong Thani (Nonthaburi)
- Pattaya Exhibition and Convention Hall (Pattaya)
- Queen Sirikit National Convention Center (Bangkok)
- Thailand Cultural Centre (Bangkok)

== Turkey ==
- Antalya Cultural Center
- Ephesus Convention Center (Kusadasi)
- Glass Pyramid Sabancı Congress and Exhibition Center (Antalya)
- Istanbul Lütfi Kırdar International Convention and Exhibition Center (Istanbul Lutfi Kirdar – ICEC)
- Mersin Congress and Exhibition Center
- World Trade Center Istanbul

== Ukraine ==
- ACCO International (Kyiv)
- Expocenter of Ukraine (Kyiv)
- International Exhibition Centre (Kyiv)
- KyivExpoPlaza (Berezivka)
- Parkovyi (Kyiv)
- Ukrainian House (Kyiv)

== United Arab Emirates ==
- Abu Dhabi National Exhibitions Company
- Dubai International Convention Centre
- Expo Centre Sharjah
- JAFZA One Convention Centre

== United Kingdom ==
=== Aberdeen ===
- P&J Live

=== Belfast ===
- King's Hall, Belfast
- Titanic Belfast
- ICC Belfast

=== Birmingham ===
- International Convention Centre
- National Exhibition Centre
- National Indoor Arena

=== Bournemouth ===
- Bournemouth International Centre

=== Brighton ===
- Brighton Centre

=== Cardiff ===
- Wales Millennium Centre

=== Cheltenham ===
- Cheltenham Racecourse

=== Edinburgh ===
- Edinburgh International Conference Centre

=== Glasgow ===
- Scottish Exhibition and Conference Centre
- The SSE Hydro

=== Harrogate ===
- Harrogate International Centre

=== Liverpool ===
- ACC Liverpool
  - BT Convention Centre
  - Exhibition Centre Liverpool

=== London ===
- 10–11 Carlton House Terrace
- Alexandra Palace
- Business Design Centre
- BMA House
- Central Hall Westminster
- Congress Centre (at Congress House)
- County Hall
- Croydon Arena
- Earls Court Exhibition Centre
- ExCeL London
- Olympia
- One Great George Street
- Queen Elizabeth II Conference Centre
- Wembley Arena
- W12 Conferences

=== Lisburn ===
- Eikon Exhibition Centre

=== Loughborough ===
- Burleigh Court Hotel and Conference Centre
- Holywell Park Conference Centre

=== Manchester ===
- EventCity
- Manchester Arena
- Manchester Central Convention Complex

=== Newcastle ===
- Utilita Arena Newcastle

=== Nottingham ===
- East Midlands Conference Centre
- Nottingham Conference Centre

=== Sheffield ===
- Octagon Centre
- Sheffield City Hall

=== Telford ===
- Telford International Centre

== Vietnam ==
- Aryana Convention Center (Danang)
- Crown Convention Center (Nha Trang)
- Saigon Exhibition and Convention Center (Ho Chi Minh City)
- Vietnam National Convention Center (Hanoi)
- Vietnam Exposition Center (Hanoi)

== See also ==
- List of convention centers named after people
- List of integrated resorts
