= List of convention centers named after people =

This is a list of convention centers named after people. It details the name of the convention center, its location and eponym.

== List ==
- Aiwan-e-Iqbal, Lahore, Pakistan, named for Muhammad Iqbal
- Anthony Wayne Ballroom at the Grand Wayne Convention Center, Fort Wayne, Indiana, United States, named for Anthony Wayne (American Revolutionary War general)
- Auditoria Benito Juarez, Los Mochis, Mexico, named for Benito Juárez (former president of Mexico)
- Bandaranaike Memorial International Conference Hall, Colombo, Sri Lanka, named for Solomon Ridgeway Dias Bandaranaike
- Bartle Hall Convention Center, Kansas City, Missouri, United States, named for Harold Roe Bartle
- Calvin L. Rampton (Salt Palace) Convention Center, Salt Lake City, Utah, United States, named for Cal Rampton (former Utah governor)
- Cobo Hall, Detroit, Michigan, United States, named for Albert Cobo (former Detroit mayor)
- David Eccles Conference Center, Ogden, Utah, United States, named for David Eccles (businessman)
- David L. Lawrence Convention Center, Pittsburgh, Pennsylvania, United States, named for David L. Lawrence
- DeVos Place Convention Center, Grand Rapids, Michigan, United States, named for Richard DeVos
- Donald E. Stephens Convention Center, Rosemont, Illinois, United States, named for Donald E. Stephens (former Rosemont mayor)
- Ernest N. Morial Convention Center, New Orleans, Louisiana, United States, named for Ernest N. Morial
- George R. Brown Convention Center, Houston, Texas, United States, named for George R. Brown (entrepreneur)
- Hynes Convention Center, Boston, Massachusetts, United States, named for John Hynes
- Jacob K. Javits Convention Center, New York City, United States, named for Jacob K. Javits
- James H. Rainwater Convention Center, Valdosta, Georgia, United States, named for James H. Rainwater (former Valdosta mayor)
- Jinnah Convention Centre, Islamabad, Pakistan, named for Quaid-e-Azam Muhammad Ali Jinnah
- Julius Nyerere International Convention Centre, Dar es Salaam, Tanzania. Named after Julius Nyerere
- Kenyatta International Conference Centre, Nairobi, Kenya. Named after Jomo Kenyatta.
- King Hussein Bin Talal Convention Center, east coast of the Dead Sea in Jordan. Named for Hussein I, former King of Jordan
- Lloyd Erskine Sandiford Conference and Cultural Centre, Two Mile Hill, Saint Michael, Barbados, named after Lloyd Erskine Sandiford (former prime minister of Barbados)
- Mahatma Mandir, Gandhinagar, Gujarat, India, named after Mahatma Gandhi
- McCormick Place, Chicago, Illinois, United States, named for Robert R. McCormick
- Michael Fowler Centre, Wellington, New Zealand, named for Sir Michael Fowler (former Wellington mayor)
- Moscone Center, San Francisco, California, United States, named for George Moscone
- Obi Wali International Conference Center, Port Harcourt, Rivers State, named for senator Obi Wali
- Prime F. Osborn III Convention Center, Jacksonville, Florida, United States, named for Prime F. Osborn III (former CSX chairman)
- Putra World Trade Centre, Kuala Lumpur, Malaysia, named for Tunku Abdul Rahman (first Prime Minister of Malaysia)
- Queen Sirikit National Convention Center, Bangkok, Thailand, named for Sirikit
- Sime Darby Convention Centre, Bukit Kiara, Kuala Lumpur, named for William Sime and Henry Darby (founders of Sime Darby
- Sultan Ahmad Shah International Convention Centre, Kuantan, Malaysia, named for Ahmad Shah of Pahang (Sultan of Pahang)
- Walter E. Washington Convention Center, Washington, D.C., named for former mayor Walter E. Washington
- William A. Egan Civic & Convention Center, Anchorage, Alaska, United States, named for William Allen Egan

== See also ==
- List of convention and exhibition centers
- List of eponyms
- List of places named after people
