= AICC =

AICC may refer to:

- AICc, a version of Akaike information criterion (AIC, which is used in statistics), that has a correction for small sample sizes
- All India Congress Committee, the central presidium of the Congress Party
- Arusha International Conference Centre, the leading conference venue in Tanzania
- Aviation Industry Computer-Based Training Committee, an e-Learning group and a tracking specification
- Aviation Industry Corporation of China, a Chinese state-owned aerospace and defense company
- Accident Investigation Coordination Committee, subordinate to the Ministry of Civil Aviation and Communication Maldives
- Arctic Icebreaker Coordinating Committee, a subcommittee of the University-National Oceanographic Laboratory System responsible for managing the US Research Icebreaker fleet
- Association for Inherited Cardiac Conditions, a UK-based association of Geneticists and Cardiologists with expertise in inherited disease
