= Burleigh Court Conference Centre and Hotel =

Coordinates: 52.76132742°N 1.23975993°W

Burleigh Court Conference Centre and Hotel is a four-star hotel and conference centre located on Loughborough University campus.

Opened in April 1991, Burleigh Court Conference Centre and Hotel has 225 bedrooms and 26 meeting rooms.

== Imago Venues ==
Burleigh Court is run by Imago Venues, the managers of conference & meeting facilities and hotels for Loughborough University via a wholly owned subsidiary company called imago@Loughborough Ltd. Other venues include Holywell Park Conference Centre, and The Link Hotel.

== London 2012 and sport ==
Burleigh Court hosted Team GB as the official preparation camp for the London 2012 games.

The hotel has regularly been the venue for the Charnwood Sports Awards, including the last time the Awards were staged in 2017.

== Awards and accreditations ==
Burleigh Court has won a number of awards including Large Hotel of the Year at the VisitEngland Awards for Excellence 2017 and Innovative Business Partner 2017 at the Leicestershire Promotions Tourism and Hospitality Awards.
