= Centro de Eventos Valle del Pacifico =

Sports venue and convention center in Colombia

Coordinates: 3.5284°N 76.4974°W

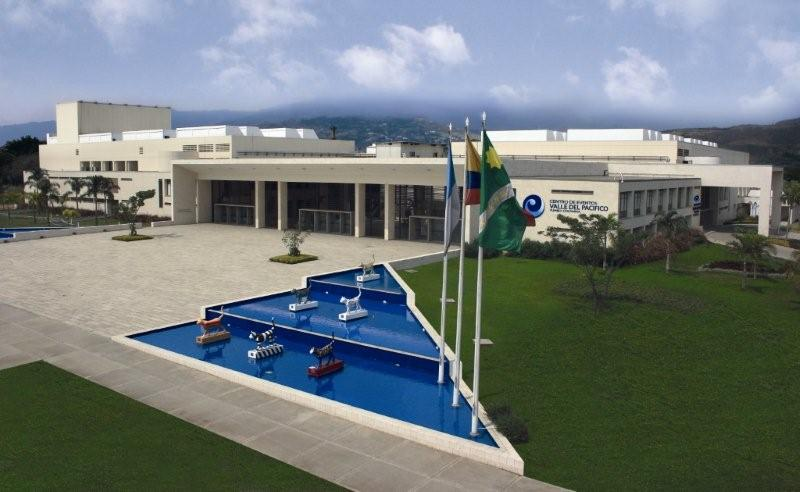
- Convention Center Pacific Valley
- Interactive map of Centro de Eventos Valle del Pacifico
- Location: Cali, Colombia
- Capacity: from 50 to 11.000 people
- Type: Convention Center/Conference
- Events: Exhibitions, Conferences, Proms, Sports Arena, Concerts

Construction
- Built: 2007

Website
- centrodeeventosvalledelpacifico.com.co

The Centro de Eventos Valle del Pacifico (Pacific Valley Events Center) is a convention center located in the city of Yumbo, Colombia on the Autopista Cali-Yumbo, 10 minutes from Alfonso Bonilla International Airport.

== History ==
The Centro de Eventos Valle del Pacifico - CEVP, was founded on November 6 of 2007. Its construction was due to the efforts of the public, private, and independent entrepreneurs of Valle del Cauca guided by the Chamber of Commerce of Cali. The financial resources for its construction were gathered by 58 regional and national companies who contributed by buying shares, donating and acquiring advertising spaces. openms

Since 2008, it has been a member of the International Congress and Convention Association - ICCA, a global community for the meetings industry, enabling its members to generate and maintain significant competitive advantage.

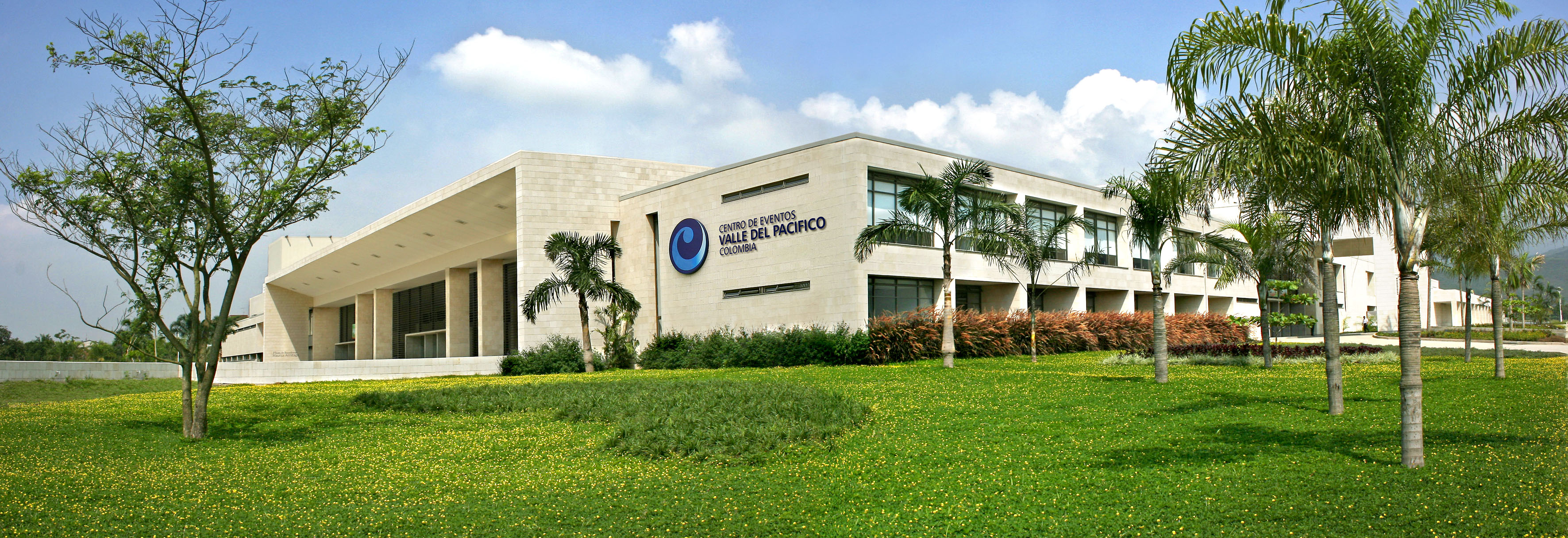
CEVP

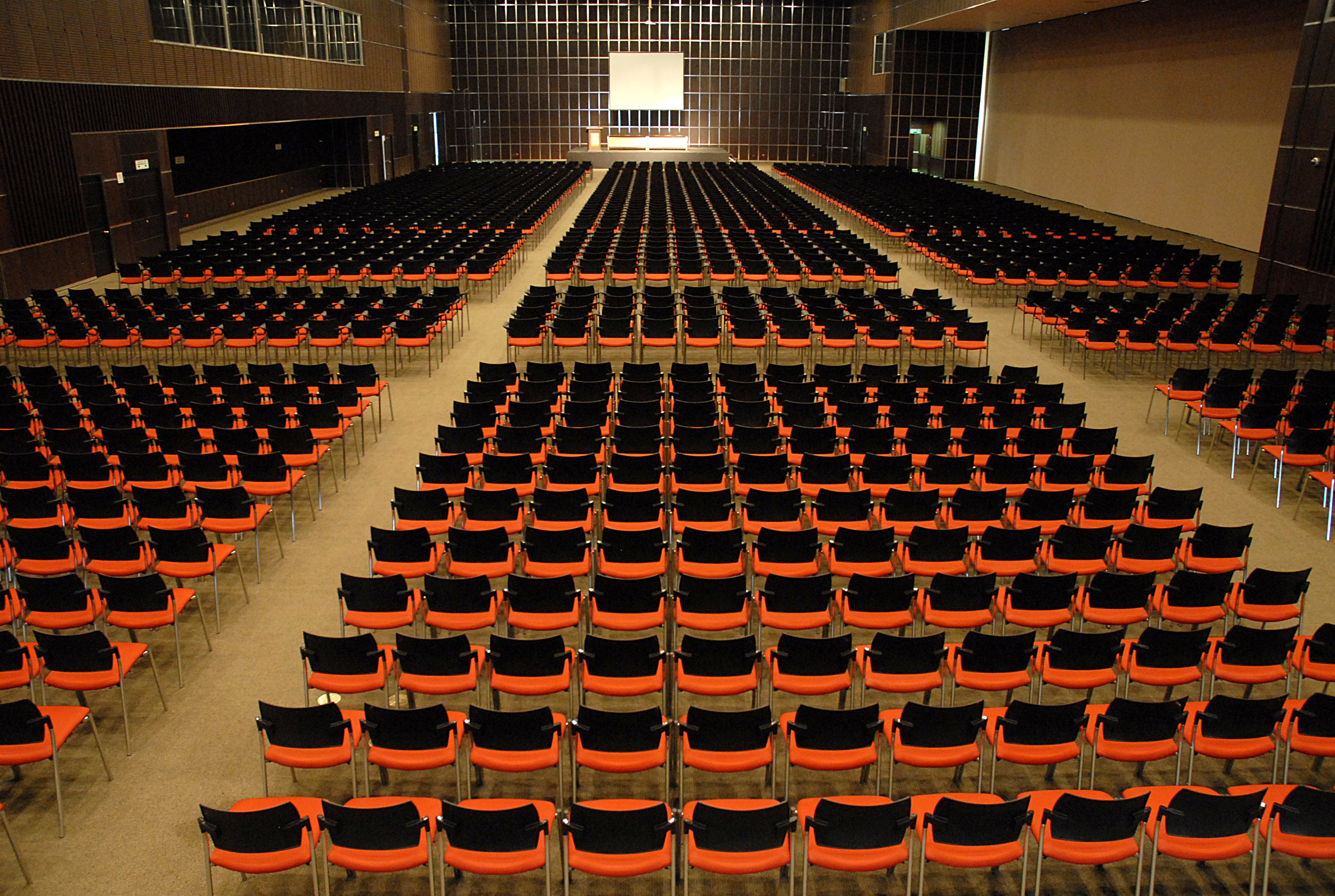
Room Rosita Jaluf

This same year The Centro de Eventos Valle del Pacifico receives the "Rosa de los Vientos" award, as the best Convention Centre, this award is given by the Colombian Tourism Press and Writers Association, (ACOPE, in Spanish).

== Structure ==
The architectural complex of the Centro de Eventos Valle del Pacifico comprises 2 main buildings, 1 registration building, 2 pavilions, a central plaza, 4 committee rooms, 4 additional meeting rooms, a media room, 1 tourist information point (TIP), 16 simultaneous translation rooms, exhibition space for placing 500 stands, a food court and a great water fountain that represents the Pacific region.

Additionally, it counts with updated technology, overall security, parking lot for 1.200 vehicles, luggage room, nursing, ATM, gift shop, travel agency, logistics platform for exhibitors to load and unload, dressing rooms, props and museum round. It is also a Transitional Zone for handling goods with special customs regime.

== Events ==
The Centro de Eventos Valle del Pacifico has served as host of many important events since its foundation date:

- First City Marketing World Congress
- Latinamerican Conference on Water and Sanitation – Latinosan
- Junior Weightlifting Worldcup
- Fencing Worldcup
- International Symposium on Microfinance
- International Conference on Safe Communities
- Congress on Small and Medium Companies of the Americas
- World Summit on the UN Biodiversity
- International Agroindustry Macro Forum
- Women Entrepreneurship Summit
- OEA (American States Organisation) Ministers and High Authorities Meeting
- Cali Exposhow - International Fashion Show
- Iberoamerican Chambers of Commerce Assembly, AICO
- 4th Free Trade Negotiation Round between Colombia and South Korea
- Pacific Motor Show
- 16th International Plastic Surgery Course
- 16th International Logistics Managers Encounter
- 5th International Social Responsibility Encounter
- International Congress on Agriculture, Sustainability and New Business
- Tourism Competes 2010

== See also ==
- List of convention centers
- Corferias
- Valle del Cauca
- Yumbo
