= Butwal International Conference Centre =

Convention centre in Butwal, Nepal

- Location of the conference centre
- Address: Ramnagar, Butwal, Lumbini Province, Nepal
- Coordinates: 27.6848015°N 83.471582°E
- Owner: Government of Nepal

Construction
- Opened: 2022

Butwal International Conference Centre (Nepali: बुटवल अन्तराष्ट्रिय सम्मेलन केन्द्र) is the largest convention center in Nepal. The assembly hall was constructed in 6.4 Bighas (approx 42,649 m^{2})of land at a cost of NPR 2.5 billion. The assembly hall has a capacity of 10,000 people. The center was inaugurated by the prime minister Sher Bahadur Deuba on 27 August 2022.

== Architecture ==
The center has a shape of Nepali national flag.

== See also ==
- International Convention Centre, Nepal
- Godavari Sunrise Convention Center
- List of convention and exhibition centers
