= TICC =

The TICC may be:

- Taipei International Convention Center in Taipei, Taiwan
- Tanga International Conference Centre in Tanga, Tanzania
