= Pithapuram Colony =

- Neighbourhood
- Location in Visakhapatnam
- Coordinates: 17.735118°N 83.323396°E
- Country: India
- State: Andhra Pradesh
- District: Visakhapatnam

Government
  - Body: Greater Visakhapatnam Municipal Corporation

Languages
  - Official: Telugu
- Time zone: UTC+5:30 (IST)
- PIN: 530003
- Vehicle registration: AP-31,32

Pithapuram Colony is a neighborhood situated on the central part of Visakhapatnam City, India. The area, which falls under the local administrative limits of Greater Visakhapatnam Municipal Corporation, is about 3.2 km from the Dwaraka bus station..Pithapuram Colony is sourrnded by Maddilapalem and Sivajipalem famous Kala Bharati and ICAI is located hear
