= Sweimeh =

Sweimeh السويمة
- village
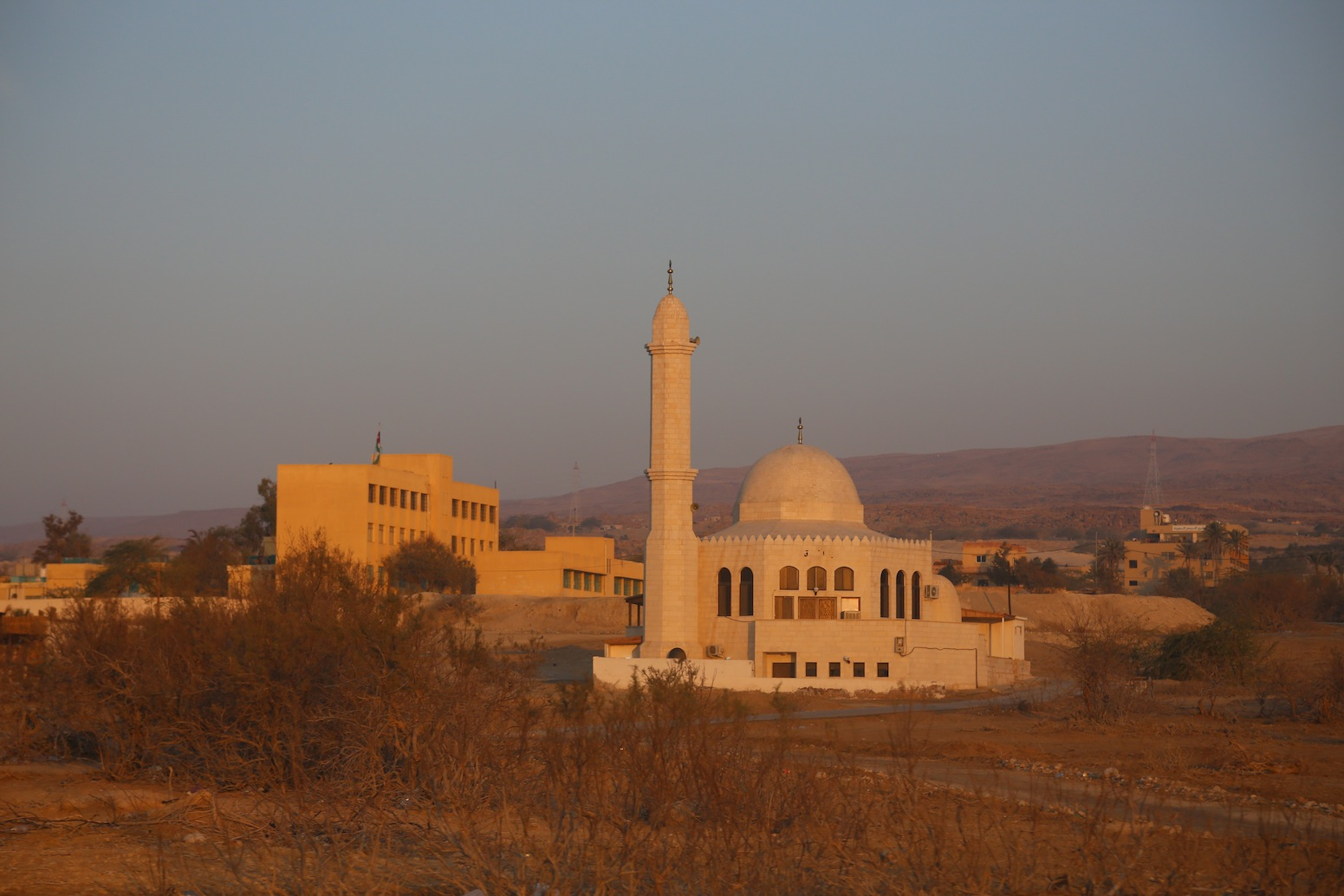

- Location in Jordan
- Coordinates: 31°45′57″N 35°35′54″E
- PAL: 206/131
- Country: Jordan
- Governorate: Balqa Governorate

Population (2015)
  - Total: 5,000
- Time zone: UTC+2 (UTC+2)
  - Summer (DST): UTC+3 (UTC+3)
- Area code: +(962)5

Sweimeh (Arabic: السويمة, romanized: as-Swayma) is a village located in the southern Jordan Valley, in the Balqa Governorate of Jordan. Its population is around 5000, within 726 households.

Sweimeh's economy is based on agriculture, alongside small projects of trading and tourism. The level of employment is low. In recent years, a seaside resort with hotels, bars, clubs, restaurants, and shopping was built at the northern tip of the Dead Sea near Sweimeh. It is also the site of the King Hussein Bin Talal Convention Center.

Sweimeh is commonly identified with the biblical town of Beth-jeshimoth.

== History ==
During the Iron Age, Sweimeh was the site of an Israelite town known as Beth-jeshimoth (Hebrew: בֵּית הַיְשִׁמוֹת, romanized: Beit ha-Yeshimot). It is mentioned in four verses of the Hebrew Bible: Numbers 33:49, Joshua 12:3; 13:20, and Ezekiel 25:9. According to the Book of Numbers, the Israelites encamped in Beth-jeshimoth during their wilderness journeys. In the Book of Joshua, it is mentioned as part of the land allocated to the Tribe of Reuben. Ezekiel lists it as one of three cities which constitute "the glory of the country" of Moab, in a passage in which God promises to punish Moab.

In classical antiquity, Beth-jeshimoth was known under its Graecised name, Bezemoth. According to Josephus, during the First Jewish-Roman War, Bezemoth was captured by the Roman army, and was used by them to resettle deserters who had joined the Roman ranks.
