= Godavari Sunrise Convention Center =

Convention center in Kathmandu, Nepal

Godavari Sunrise Convention Center (Godawari Sunrise Samelan Kendra)
- Location within Kathmandu valley Godavari Sunrise Convention Center (Godawari Sunrise Samelan Kendra) (Bagmati Province) Godavari Sunrise Convention Center (Godawari Sunrise Samelan Kendra) (Nepal)
- Address: Godawari, Lalitpur, Lalitpur, Bagmati Province, Nepal
- Coordinates: 27.5954°N 85.3742°E
- Owner: Government of Nepal

Construction
- Opened: 2021

Godavari Sunrise Convention Center (Nepali: गोदावारी सनराइज सम्मेलन केन्द्र) was the second largest convention center of Nepal. The assembly hall was constructed in 43 Ropanis (approx 21875 m^{2})of land at a cost of NPR 810 million. The assembly hall had the capacity of 3000 people. The center was inaugurated by KP Sharma Oli in 2021. The convention was destroyed alongside various other government buildings during the Gen Z protest in September 9, 2025. The government has initiated reconstruction process of the facilities.

== Architecture and facility ==
The main building of the center has been designed as symbol of rising sun and occupies about 27% of total land. The main hall is 28 m high and has a capacity of 3000 people. There is garden with area of 16 Ropanis (8140 m^{2}) and has a parking area of 13 Ropanis (6614 m^{2}).

== Construction ==
The building was scheduled to be built by November 12, 2020, but it was delayed due to COVID19.

It was constructed by KC-Samanantar JV. Post it's destruction during the 2025 Gen Z protests, the government has completed the design phase of the reconstruction and the department of urban development and building construction has estimated the cost at around NPR 50 crore (500 million rupees).

== See also ==
- International Convention Centre, Nepal
- Butwal International Conference Centre
- List of convention and exhibition centers
