= Obi Wali International Conference Centre =

Convention center in Nigeria

Coordinates: 4°50′35″N 7°0′49″E

Obi Wali International Conference Centre is a convention centre in Port Harcourt, Rivers State, Nigeria. It is named in the honor and memory of Obi Wali, a prominent political figure from Ikwerreland and is run by the state government.

Plans to build the convention center were drawn up in May 2008. Construction began in 2012 and the facility was officially opened for public use in 2014.

== Notable events ==
Rivers State People's Democratic Party hosted its state convention at this venue in 2016.

- On 10 June 2016, it was announced that the 12th Africa Movie Academy Awards ceremony will be held at the facility on Saturday, 11 June.
- Nigerian Optometric Association (NOA) Conference and Expo 2016 will be held here from 13 to 16 July 2016.
- The [West African Architecture Festival] (WAAF 2016) was held on the 24th-28 October at the Obi Wali Oil and Gas Conference Center
- The [West African Architecture Festival] (WAAF 2017) was also held on the 24th-28 October at the Obi Wali Conference Center
- Nigerian Institute of Architects has also announced that The 2018 West Africa Festival is going to be held at the Obi-Wali Conference Center

== See also ==
- List of convention and exhibition centers
- List of convention centers named after people
