= Obi Wali =

Nigerian politician and writer

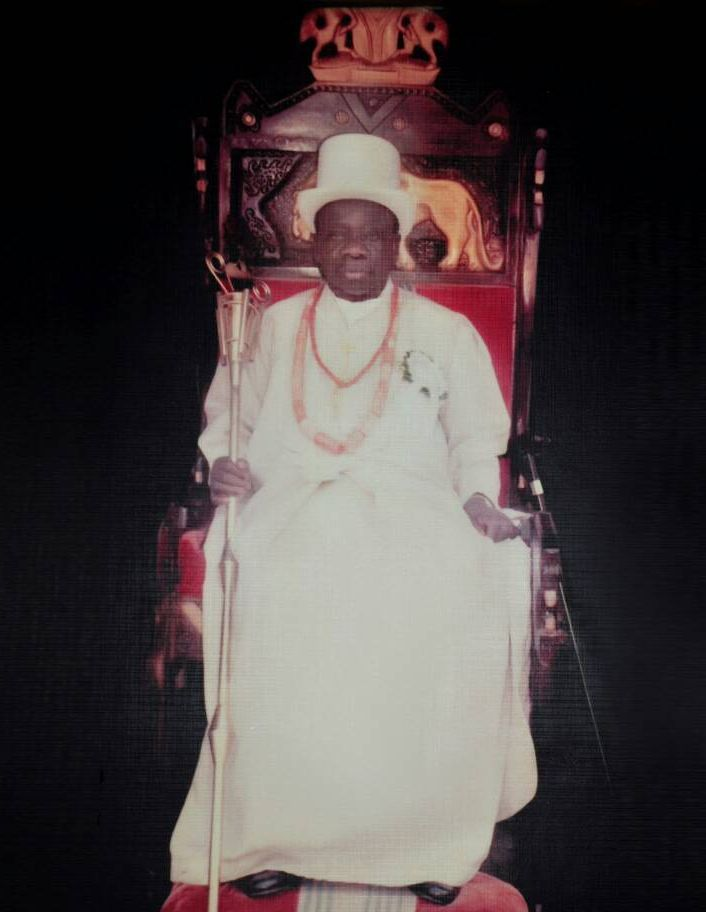
- Dr Obi Wali following his coronation as a Chief in Apara clan
- Born: 1932; Rumuigbo Town
- Died: 26 April 1993 (aged 60–61)
- Occupations: Nigerian politician and writer

Obi Wali (27 February 1932 – 26 April 1993) was a minority rights activist, politician, distinguished senator, literary scholar, and an orator from Nigeria. Among his achievements, he fought for the cause of the Ikwerre ethnic minorities and argued that African literature should be written in African languages.

== Early life ==
Obi Wali was born on 27 February 1932 in Rumuigbo Town, headquarters of Apara Kingdom, in Obio Akpor Local Government Area of Rivers State. His parents were Chief Frank Wali Otogbo (1889-1980) and Princess Jane Wali Otogbo (1895-1976) daughter of the famous Chief Ezebunwo Amadi Nwondugba (Deceased) of (Worenwu Family) Oroworukwo Wami Community, the then paramount ruler of Oroworukwo Rebisi in Port Harcourt Local Government Area of Rivers State. He had a younger sibling, Mrs Patience Waku Okabie Worgu (1935 - 2019). He was educated at the West African People's Institute, Calabar, followed by St. Augustine's Secondary School, Nkwerre. For his higher education he attended the University College Ibadan, where he specialized in literature. He then continued his studies in the United States, where he obtained a doctorate degree in English Language and literature at the Northwestern University, Evanston, Illinois. USA Northwestern University

Little additional information is available about his early life or personal/family life.

== Career ==
Wali was one of the founding fathers of Rivers State in Nigeria and served as the first Commissioner for Education, as well as a member of the first executive council of the state. He was later elected as a member of the 1978 Constituent Assembly and also as a member of the Constitution Drafting Committee that drafted the 1979 Constitution of the Federal Republic of Nigeria. He was elected as a senator of the Federal Republic of Nigeria in the Second Republic and in 1980 he was elected the Minority Leader of the Senate, Federal Republic of Nigeria.

As a politician, he is perhaps most remembered for championing the cause of the Ikwerre ethnic minorities in Nigeria. Senator Wali was one of the best known leaders from the Niger Delta region to consistently campaign against the marginalization of the Niger Delta people (particularly the Ikwerre ethnic nationality). He fought for the creation of Port Harcourt out of the then Rivers State of Nigeria. Creating the Port Harcourt State for the Ikwerre people was an important achievement in his advocacy for the end of the marginalization and oppression of the Ikwerre, and the state-inspired exploitation of their resources. Wali campaigned for the correction of the imbalances in the socio-economic and political power of the Nigerian state throughout his political career. He also is remembered for his call for a critical examination of Nigeria's commitments to the Economic Community of West African States (ECOWAS).

In addition to his political roles, Wali was a professor at the University of Nigeria, Nsukka, where he taught courses including "Introduction to African Literature." Beyond his educational and political contributions in Nigeria, Wali also contributed to literary scholarship.

== Contributions and views on African literature ==
Wali is known for his assertion that African literature should only be written in African languages. He emphasized the importance that works deemed "African" be written in the languages of the African peasantry and working classes rather than in English or other foreign languages. Through an alliance of these classes within the many nationalities of Africa, he predicted an "inevitable revolutionary break with neo-colonialism." He expressed these views in his controversial essay "The Dead End of African Literature", which is considered a landmark in the field of African literary modernity. In the essay, Wali writes "an African writer who thinks and feels in his own language must write in that language." Wali presented this paper in 1962 at Makerere University in Uganda at the first major conference on new African writing at the institution. The well-known paper went on to be published in the tenth issue of Transition magazine.

Although opposed by some, Wali's essay has been lauded by many African literary giants such as Ngũgĩ wa Thiong'o, who changed his name to a traditional African name after reading Wali's argument. Additionally, Wali argues that it is necessary for literary critics to learn African languages before analyzing African literary texts and producing theories about their meanings. Wali and Ngũgĩ's viewpoint that African literature be exclusively written in African languages is often positioned in opposition to the opinions of Chinua Achebe and Ama Ata Aidoo, who argued that African literature can also be written in foreign languages.

== Suspected assassination ==
Wali was violently murdered and dismembered at home in his bedroom by suspected hired assassins on 26 April 1993. The reasons for the murder remain unestablished; however, many speculated that it was in connection with his political opinions. At the time of his murder, Wali was a respected Nigerian Senator of Rivers State. He was later buried on 24 February 1994. This was not long before the Nigerian state executed another minority rights activist, Ken Saro-Wiwa.

General Ibrahim Babangida (former Nigerian Military Head of State), Chief Rufus Ada George (former Governor of Rivers State), and Peter Odili (then Governor of Rivers State) among others were accused of complicity in Wali's murder in Port Harcourt. The case of Wali's murder was brought before a commission investigating human rights abuses, before which allegations of cover up were forwarded by the Ikwere Community and Wali's son, Ihumuo, along with his wife Nnenna.

== Legacy and memory ==
In 2014 the Obi Wali International Conference Centre was opened to the public in Port Harcourt, Rivers State, created and named in the memory of Obi Wali's political and literary contributions.

Furthermore, the Ikwerre people organize an annual memorial lecture in Obi Wali's honor.

== Published works ==
- The Individual and the Novel in Africa (1965)
- The Dead End of African Literature (1963)

== See also ==
- Ken Saro-Wiwa
