= CSIR International Convention Centre =

- Interactive map of CSIR International Convention Centre
- Address: Meiring Naudé Rd, Brummeria, Pretoria
- Location: Council for Scientific and Industrial Research grounds
- Coordinates: 25°45′11″S 28°16′36″E
- Owner: Council for Scientific and Industrial Research
- Public transit: Hatfield (Gautrain station)

Construction
- Opened: 1979; 47 years ago

Website
- www.csiricc.co.za

The CSIR International Convention Centre (CSIR ICC) is a convention centre in Pretoria, South Africa. The centre is situated in the east of South Africa's capital city within the research, academic and ambassadorial hub of Tshwane and is on the grounds of the Council for Scientific and Industrial Research (CSIR).

With a R35m upgrade and expansion, the CSIR ICC now has 12 venues, including a 1000 square metre exhibition hall and outdoor dining deck.

== Venues ==
The CSIR ICC has multiple venues.

Venue	Capacity
Diamond Auditorium	450
Ruby Auditorium	136
Emerald Auditorium	100
Sapphire Room	10
Amethyst Room	140
Crystal Room	70
Garnet Room	40
Onyx Room	70
Crystal/Garnet	110
Crystal/Garnet/Onyx	160
Jade Banquet Room	100
Amber Banquet Room	450
Amber I Banquet Room	200
Amber II Banquet Room	100
Deck	500
Exhibition Hall	1000
VIP Suite	6
