= The Grand Palm Hotel (Gaborone Botswana) =

Hotel in Gaborone, Botswana

The Grand Palm Hotel Casino and Convention Resort
- Interactive map of the The Grand Palm Hotel Casino and Convention Resort area

General information
- Location: Gaborone, Botswana
- Coordinates: 24°39′29″S 25°54′44″E

The Grand Palm Hotel Casino and Convention Resort is a hotel located just a few minutes from the city centre of Gaborone, capital city of Botswana. The hotel is located about 7.6 miles away from Sir Seretse Khama International Airport.

The Grand Palm was the first hotel of the present-day Peermont Group. It was founded in 1995 as a re-launch of Gaborone's former Sheraton Hotel.
