= Thiruvambady Convention Centre, Thrissur =

Thiruvambady Convention Centre
- Location within Kerala

General information
- Type: Auditorium
- Architectural style: Ethnic
- Location: Thrissur, Kerala, India, Marar Road, Thrissur- 680001
- Coordinates: 10.5216°N 76.2089°E
- Opened: 29 March 2015
- Owner: Thiruvambady Devaswom

Website
- Thiruvambady Convention Centre

Thiruvambady Convention Centre is located at Marar Road in Thrissur city of Kerala state. The convention centre was built by Thiruvambady Devaswom, that manages day-to-day administration and functions of Thiruvambadi Sri Krishna Temple, Thrissur.

The convention centre is spread across an area of 1.25 acres (5,100 m^{2}) with a built-up area of 90,000 square feet (8,400 m^{2}) and has been divided into 2 blocks. The main block consists of a lobby, centralized air-conditioned auditorium named "Nandanam" which can seat more than 1100 people and a dining hall "Dwaraka" that can accommodate more than 500 people at a time. The second block named "Sreevalsam" annexed to convention centre has a mini hall, 22 living rooms, and cafeteria. This edifice also offers parking facility for around 140 cars within the compound.

== See also ==
- Thiruvambadi Sri Krishna Temple
