= Isfahan international convention center =

Iranian convention center

مرکز همایش‌های بین‌المللی اصفهان Isfahan International Convention Center
- Interactive map of مرکز همایش‌های بین‌المللی اصفهان; Isfahan International Convention Center
- Address: Isfahan 4th Ring, Shohadaye Ashkavand flyover
- Coordinates: 32.58868°N 51.74424°E

Website
- isf-icc.ir

Isfahan International Convention Center Persian: مرکز همایش‌های بین‌المللی اصفهان (officially the Imam Khamenei International Convention Center, after Iranian supreme leader Ali Khamenei) is a convention center in Isfahan, Iran. The main hall has a capacity of 2,354 people, with offices, a cinema, and parking. It is attached to a 12 floor hotel and 8 VIP villas.

The project cost 670 billion tomans as of January 2020, when it was 80% complete. It was inaugurated in August 2021.

== Gallery ==
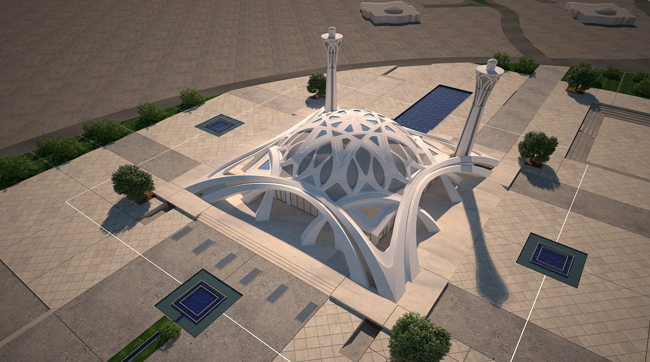
Computer-generated graphic of the mosque

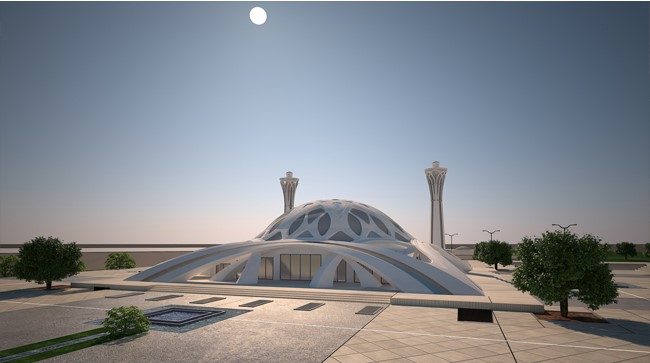
Computer-generated graphic of the mosque from ground level

== See also ==
- Isfahan Exhibition
