= Kala Bharati =

Auditorium at Pithapuram Colony

Coordinates: 17.735649°N 83.323910°E

Kala Bharati is an auditorium at Pithapuram Colony in Visakhapatnam, India., opened on 3 March 1991. It is owned by Visakha Music and Dance Academy and has a seating capacity of 900.
