= Association for Inherited Cardiac Conditions =

The Association for Inherited Cardiac Conditions is the UK national professional body for experts in genetics and cardiology dealing with inherited diseases of the heart. These include heart muscle diseases such as hypertrophic cardiomyopathy, dilated cardiomyopathy, noncompaction cardiomyopathy, and arrhythmogenic cardiomyopathy (also known as arrhythmogenic right ventricular dysplasia), as well as inherited arrhythmia disorders such as long QT syndrome, Brugada syndrome, and catecholaminergic polymorphic ventricular tachycardia (CPVT). The AICC also represents experts in aortic disease such as Marfan syndrome and other systemic diseases which affect the heart or circulation.

Individually, many of these diseases are rare, but in total they affect a large number of people worldwide. They are an important cause of sudden death in young people.

The AICC was set up in 2009 as part of NHS improvement. The first President was Professor William McKenna. It holds an annual conference as well as sessions at the annual meeting of the British Cardiovascular Society and the Heart Rhythm Congress. Its members are involved in research into the natural history, diagnosis and management of these diseases, including projects such as the 100,000 Genomes Project run by Genomics England
