= Corferias =

Convention center in Bogotá, Colombia

Coordinates: 4°37′47″N 74°05′25″W

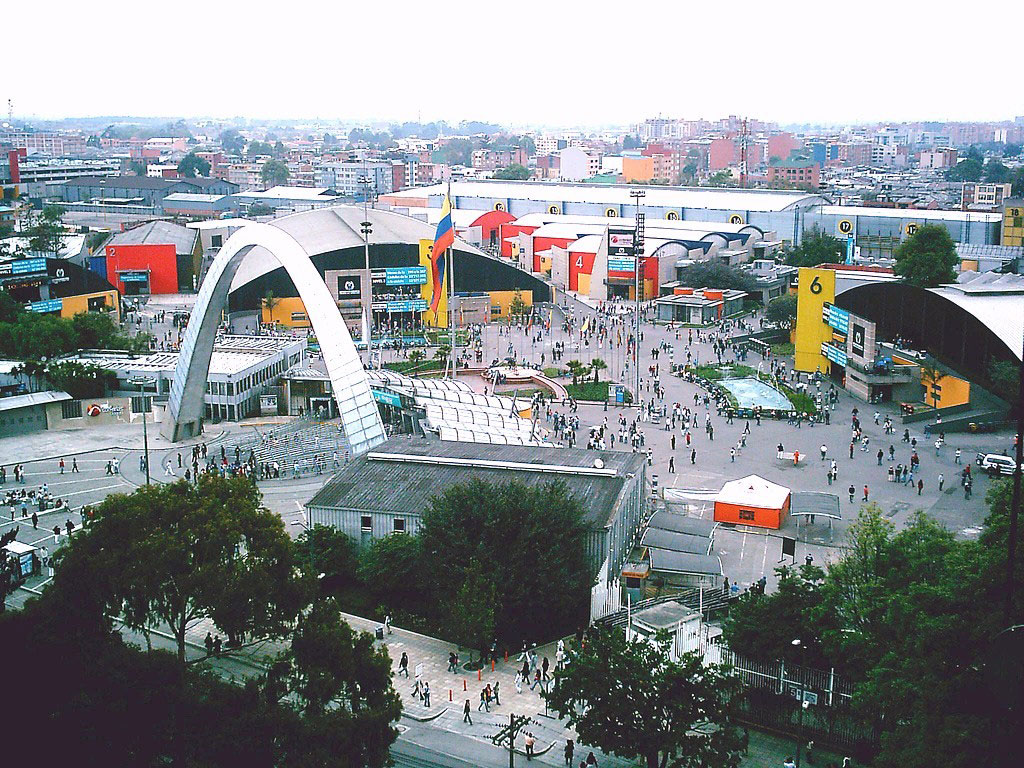
- Interactive map of Corferias
- Location: Bogotá, Colombia
- Owner: Chamber of Commerce of Bogotá
- Type: Conference centre/Arena
- Events: Exhibitions, Conferences, Proms, Sports Arena, Concerts

Construction
- Built: 1954
- Expanded: 2009, 2011

Website
- Corferias.com

Corferias is a convention center located in the city of Bogotá Colombia, between Quinta Paredes and El Recuerdo neighborhoods. It is a venue of local, national and international events. Although it was originally created only as a fair space it has also served as an important place for social activities including voting and it is used by companies and individuals for cultural events.

== History ==
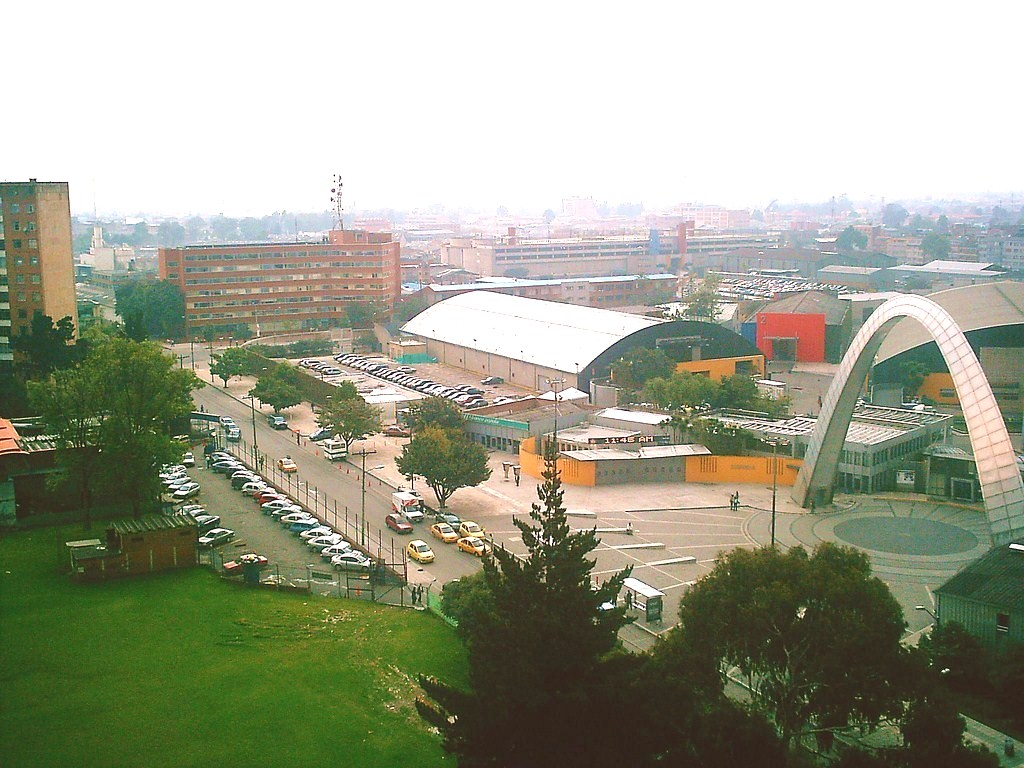
Main entry to Corferias with the arch that has become the symbol of such organization.

Corferias was founded on June 8, 1954, by decree 1772 as mixed capital investment between the Colombian Ministry of Foment and the Association of Medium and Small Companies (ACOPI).

On October 29, 1954, it opened its doors with the creation of the first international exposition fair that would be later called International Fair of Bogotá. In 1955 Corferias became a public limited company when ACOPI sold some of its shares to the Institute of Industrial Foment (IFI).

In 1971 the Association of Fairs of America was founded with the goal of regulating the fair-related activities in South America. Initially the association was conformed by the cities of Bogotá, Lima, Santiago de Chile, and El Salvador. Corferias assumed the presidency of said association. From 1974 to 1988 the events were increased to seven per year.

In 1989 the Chamber of Commerce of Bogotá acquired the 100% of Corferias' shares and Hernando Restrepo Londono would become its new director.

== Structure ==
As of 2010 Corferias has 17 exposition pavilions. It includes a roof-covered area of 44,430 m^{2} (478,200 sq ft) and 15,000 m^{2} (160,000 sq ft) of open spaces. Since 2002 a room called Gran Salon Oscar Perez Gutierrez is being used. It has a covered space of 6,000 m^{2} (65,000 sq ft) that allows events with an audience of 6,000 people sitting and 13,000 standing up. A new pavilion is in the process of being built that will allow an even bigger audience of 10,500 people seated and 21,000 standing. It is also the city's most attended voting place during election season.

== Notable events ==
Corferias has served as host of many cultural events throughout its history, among them they are notable:

=== Cultural events ===
- ARTBO
- International book fair of Bogotá
- Handcrafts Fair Expoartesanias.
- Iberoamerican Theatre festival
- Colonies fair
- International Fair of Bogotá
- Gastronomy fair

=== International events ===
- Campus Party
- Latin American fair of entertainment
- Andean Fair of Tabletop Games
- International Fair of the Environment
- International Art Fair of Bogotá
- International Agro Expo.
- MTV Awards
- Kids Choice Awards
- D23 Colombia

=== National events ===
- Voting posts for the National Elections Council
- Launch of the 2011 U-20 FIFA World cup

=== Corporate events ===
- Home fair
- Fantasy and Leisure Salon
- Salon of Fashion
- Leather Show
- Fair of young entrepreneurs
- International fair of Health
- Wines Expo
- Brides Expo
- International Automovil Expo

== See also ==
- Convention center
- List of convention and exhibition centers
- Simón Bolívar Park
