= Tabriz International Exhibition Center =

Coordinates: 38°02′30.97″N 46°24′55.25″E

Tabriz International Exhibition Center (Persian: نمایشگاه بین‌المللی تبریز) is an exhibition center located in the eastern part of Tabriz, Iran.
