= Julius Nyerere International Convention Centre =

Convention centre in Dar es Salaam, Tanzania

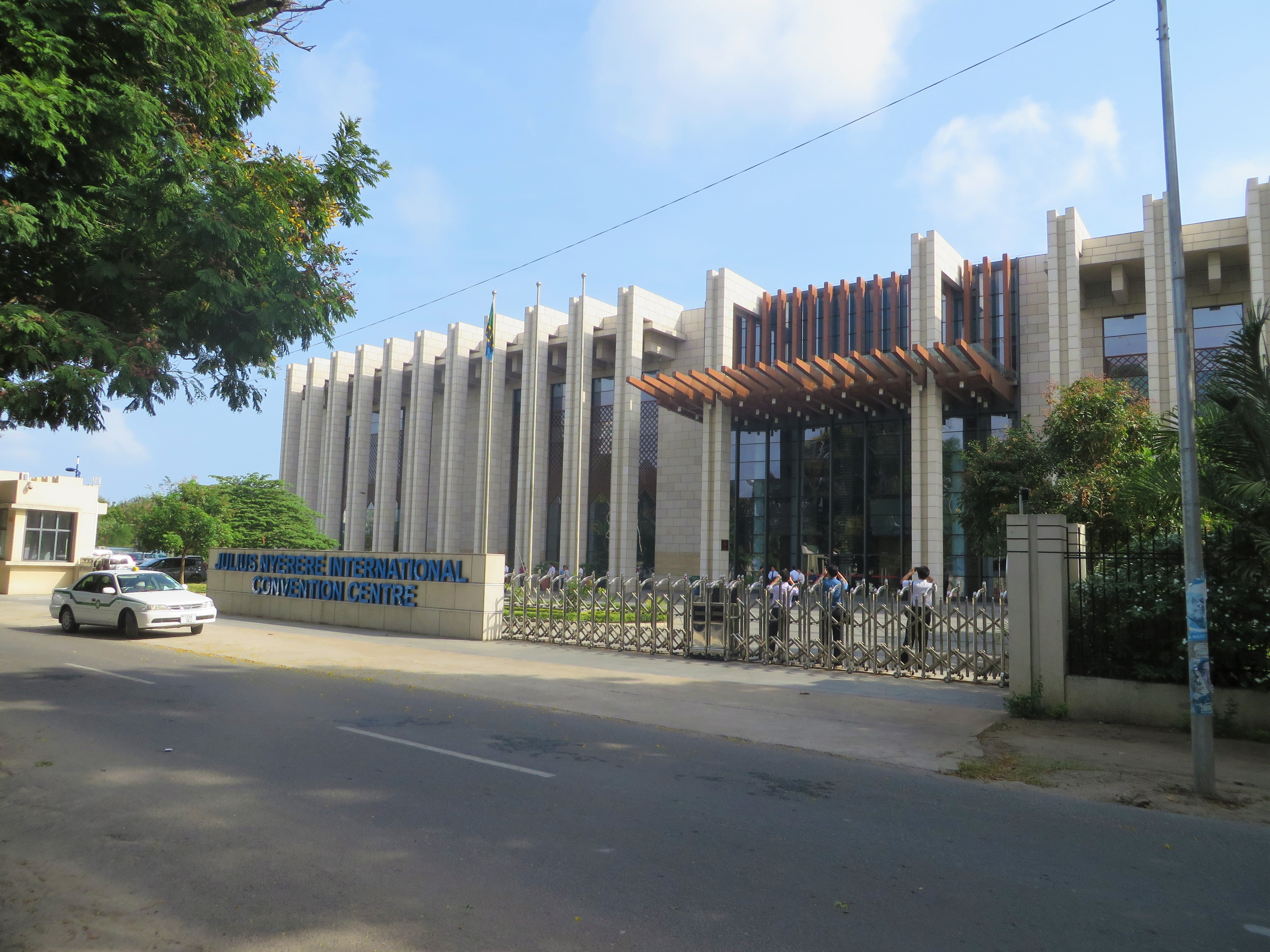
- Interactive map of Julius Nyerere International Convention Centre
- Address: Shaaban Robert Street
- Location: Kivukoni, Dar es Salaam, Tanzania
- Coordinates: 6°48′39″S 39°17′31″E
- Owner: Government of Tanzania
- Operator: AICC

Construction
- Built: 2010–2012
- Cost: US$ 15 million

The Julius Nyerere International Convention Centre (JNICC) is a convention centre located in Dar es Salaam, Tanzania. It is named after Julius Nyerere, Tanzania's first president.
