= Ministry of Civil Aviation and Communication (Maldives) =

2008–2012 Government ministry of the Maldives

Ministry overview
- Formed: 2008
- Dissolved: 7 July 2010
- Superseding ministry: Ministry of Transport and Civil Aviation
- Jurisdiction: Government of the Maldives

The Ministry of Civil Aviation and Communication was a ministry of the government of the Maldives. The ministry was responsible for ensuring a safe transport network, both domestically and internationally.

The Accident Investigation Coordination Committee (AICC), which was subordinate to the ministry, investigates aviation accidents and incidents in the Maldives.

The ministry was established during the presidency of President Nasheed and was abolished on 7 July 2010, with its successor being the Ministry of Transport and Civil Aviation.

== See also ==
- Maldives Civil Aviation Authority
