= Salon Teotihuacan =

Arena in Guerrero

Coordinates: 32.6420°N 115.4712°W

Salon Teotihuacan (Teotihuacan Hall) is a 6,000-seat indoor arena in Acapulco, Guerrero. It is the flagship exhibit hall of Centro Internacional Acapulco, and was built in 1973. It was the largest exhibit hall until the 2008 completion of the Mundo Imperial complex. However, the hall has successfully doubled as a sports and entertainment venue, the largest indoor arena in the state of Guerrero.

It has been used for boxing, wrestling, concerts, conventions, trade shows, banquets, and other sporting events. Additionally it has hosted La Academia's Third Generation finale, several Premios TVyNovelas ceremonies and the Miss Universe pageant. During one Miss Universe pageant held at Salon Teotihuacan, held in 1978, one of the participants was Miss Costa Rica, Maria Fernandez Garcia, who would end up staying in Mexico, becoming an actress and singer as Maribel Guardia.

In addition to Maribel Guardia, other Mexican celebrities who have entertained at the Salon Teotihuacan have included Angélica María, Vicente Fernández, Antonio Aguilar, Pepe Aguilar, Lupita D'Alessio, Gloria Trevi, Paulina Rubio, David Bisbal, Vargas de Tecalitlán, Alejandra Guzmán and Angélica Vale. The latter—the daughter of Angélica María—was honored as Best Actress at the 2007 Premios TVyNovelas ceremony, held at Salon Teotihuacan.

Although no longer Acapulco's largest exhibit hall—its dimensions are 187 by 377 feet (57 by 115 meters) for a total of nearly 70,500 square feet—Salon Teotihuacan has successfully made the transition to becoming a sports and entertainment venue. The arena's height is 39.5 feet (12.0 meters). On the occasion of the convention center's 40th anniversary, Salon Teotihuacan landed a new anchor tenant, becoming for the 2013-14 LNBP season the home of the Angeles Guerreros de Acapulco basketball team.
