= Isfahan Exhibition =

Iranian trade fair

Isfahan Fair
- Native name: نمایشگاه بین المللی اصفهان
- Company type: National brand
- Headquarters: Isfahan 32°36′13″N 51°46′55″E, Iran
- Website: isfahanfair.ir

Isfahan Fair is a trade fair in Isfahan City. Its chief executive officer is Dr AhmadReza Tahanian.

The project is planned to span 22 hectares (54 acres), but Phase 1 covers only 25,000 square metres [270,000 sq ft]. Completion is expected to boost the city's economy by increasing the stay time of tourists from 24 hours to a few days. More than 100 contracts were signed during the building process. At one point construction was halted, but it resumed in 2016.

Phase 1 was financed by the Chamber of Commerce, small investors (16 billion tomans) and Isfahan Municipal (32 billion tomans). The floor is made of hard, colored concrete, with foundation tunnels which are two meters in height. Other buildings include a data center, customs area, hotel, bank, offices, and water supply. Three expos with a maximum of 550 booths can be held simultaneously. There are two elevators that can accommodate 42 people, as well as multiple escalators. The structure is built to resemble an eagle and to blend in with the background mountain. The green space uses reclaimed water and electricity, and in part is solar powered. There is a new event held every week.

It was opened on 4 November 2020.

== See also ==
- Imam Khamenei international convention center
