= International Convention Centre, Nepal =

Convention center in Kathmandu, Nepal

- अन्तर्राष्ट्रिय सम्मेलन केन्द्र, नेपाल
- BICC Hall
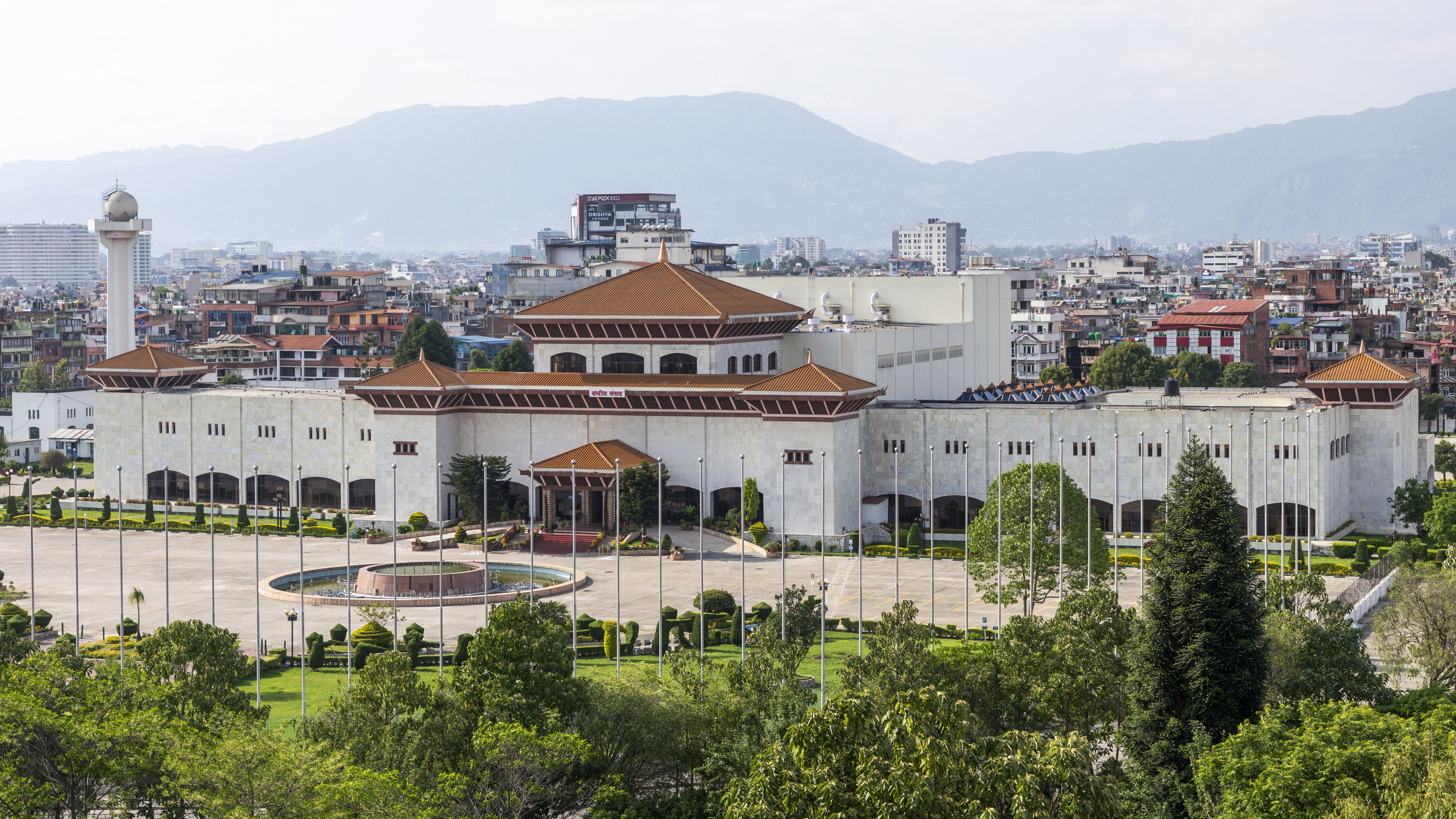

- Location within Kathmandu valley International Convention Centre, Nepal (Bagmati Province) International Convention Centre, Nepal (Nepal)
- Former names: Birendra International Convention Centre
- Address: New Baneshwor, Kathmandu, Bagmati Province, Nepal; Kathmandu; Nepal
- Location: New Baneshwor, Kathmandu
- Coordinates: 27°41′22″N 85°20′14″E
- Owner: Government of Nepal
- Operator: Federal Parliament of Nepal (Until September 2025)

Construction
- Opened: 1993
- Closed: 9 September 2025
- Cost: 16 million USD

Website
- Official website

The International Convention Centre, formerly known as the Birendra International Convention Centre (BICC), was a major conference venue and parliamentary building in Nepal. Located in New Baneshwor, Kathmandu, it housed the Federal Parliament of Nepal. The complex blended Nepalese and modern architecture to create a luxuriously decorated solid structure with multifunctional modern facilities. Built under gratis by China, the BICC was formally inaugurated in 1993. On 9 September 2025, the building was among multiple other government buildings and political offices burned down during the Gen Z protests.

As of 1 August 2026, it still remains closed.

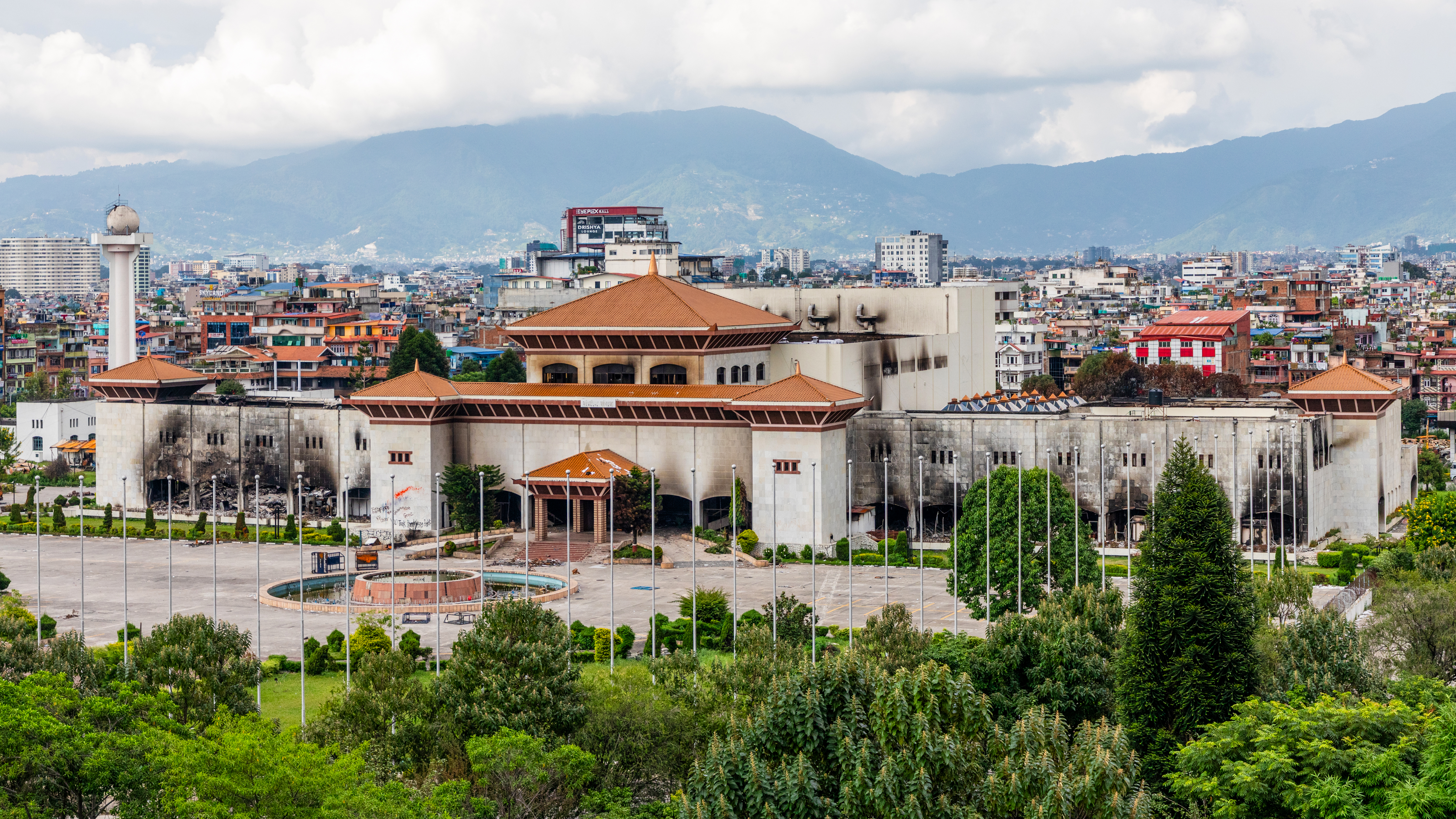
Damage to the convention centre resulting from the 2025 Nepalese Gen Z protests

== See also ==
- Godavari Sunrise Convention Center
- List of convention and exhibition centers
