= Tanga International Conference Centre =

- Interactive map of Tanga International Conference Centre
- Location: Tanga, Tanzania
- Coordinates: 5°9′10″S 39°5′54″E

Construction
- Built: 2007 – 2008

Website
- www.meetingpointtanga.net

The Tanga International Conference Centre (TICC) is located in Tanga, Tanzania.
