= King Hussein Bin Talal Convention Centre Managed by Hilton =

Convention centre in Jordan

- Interactive map of the King Hussein Bin Talal Convention Centre Managed by Hilton area

General information
- Location: Sweimeh, Jordan, Dead Sea Road, Sweimeh, 11953
- Coordinates: 31.7214°N 35.5894°E
- Owner: Hilton Worldwide
- Operator: Hilton

Website
- King Hussein Bin Talal Convention Centre Managed by Hilton

The King Hussein Bin Talal Convention Centre, managed by Hilton (KHBTCC) is a convention center located on the eastern shores of the Dead Sea, near Sweimeh. It is named after the late king of Jordan, Hussein Bin Talal (1952–1999). The convention center forms a part of the Hilton Dead Sea Resort & Spa complex, a five-star hotel operated by Hilton Worldwide under its flagship Hilton brand.

The KHBTCC launched in 2005. The three-story center hosts over 3,000 guests and has 27 conference halls, lounges, foyers, and several outdoor terraces on 24,000 square metres (260,000 sq ft) of floor space. It is distanced by 65 kilometers from Queen Alia International Airport and 45 kilometers from Amman.

The KHBTCC can accommodate approximately 4,000 people. The center hosted a 2007 regional meeting of the World Economic Forum and meetings of the International Monetary Fund.
