= Two Mile Hill, Barbados =

Locality in Bridgetown, Barbados

Coordinates: 13°6′10.26″N 59°35′26.16″W

Two Mile Hill is an area two miles (3.2 km) away from Bridgetown, in Saint Michael, Barbados. The Two Mile Hill area was historically one of the railway stations on the island of Barbados. The Barbados Railway was a part of the island's colonial distribution network for the sugar cane industry while the country was under the control of Great Britain. The location no longer has a railway and is now instead known more for its Sherbourne Conference Centre.
