= Aiwan-e-Iqbal =

Office complex and monument in Lahore, Pakistan

Coordinates: 31°33′38.7″N 74°19′48.6″E

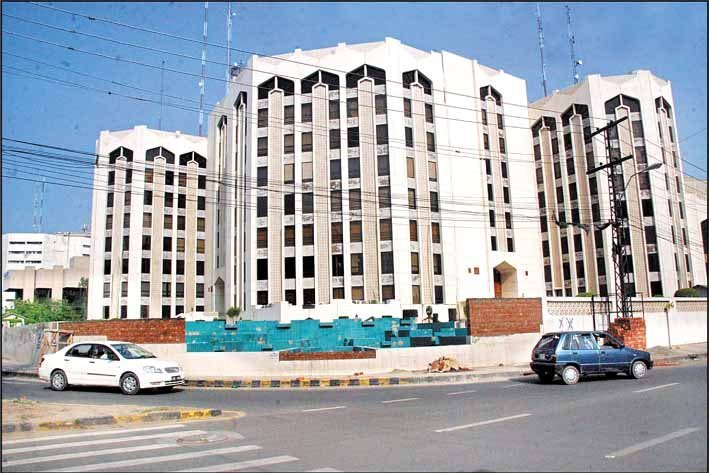
Aiwan-e-Iqbal, Lahore

Aiwan-e-Iqbal (Urdu: ایوانِ اقبال) is an office complex and monument in Lahore, Punjab, Pakistan under the administrative control of Ministry of Information, Broadcasting and National Heritage.

The building is named after the poet-philosopher Allama Muhammad Iqbal, a leader of the Pakistan Movement who is widely credited with sparking the pan-Islamic thought among the Muslims of the subcontinent in the 20th century. Ceremonies in his honour are sometimes held in the building.

Aiwan-e-Iqbal is located at Edgerton Road, Lahore, and includes three rentable buildings, a large convention hall, meeting rooms, banquet hall and three portrait/painting galleries of Allama Muhammad Iqbal. It was inaugurated in October 1989. The people of Pakistan celebrate Iqbal Day (Youm-i-Iqbal) every year on his birth anniversary on 9 November, which is a public holiday in the country.

== Ministers ==
- Chaudhary Shafqat Mahmood - (2018–2022)

== Administrators ==
The Aiwan-e-Iqbal complex is run by an administrator, appointed by the Federal Government of Pakistan: Here is the list of Administrators of Aiwan-e-Iqbal Complex:

- Muhammad Arshad - (1993–2002)
- Muhammad Suheyl Umar - (2002–2010)
- Nadeem Iqbal Abbasi - (2010–2013)
- Anjum Waheed - (2013– )
