= Lloyd Erskine Sandiford Centre =

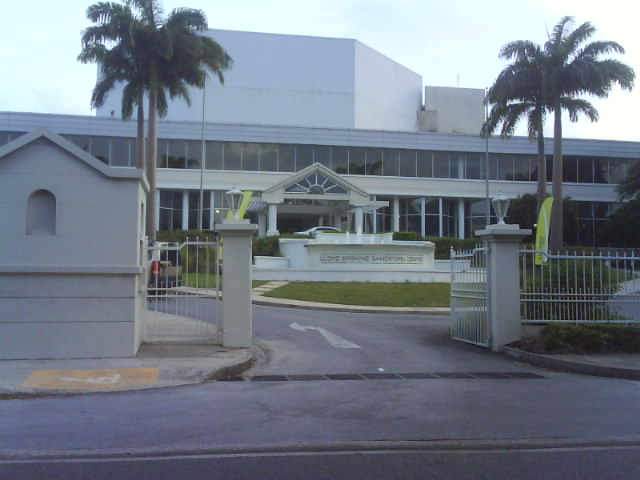
- Lloyd Erskine Sandiford Centre Two Mile Hill St. Michael
- Interactive map of Lloyd Erskine Sandiford Centre
- Former names: Sherbourne Conference Centre
- Address: Highway 5, Two Mile Hill, St. Michael, BB11093, Barbados, West Indies
- Coordinates: 13.104°N 59.583°W
- Owner: Government of Barbados
- Operator: Barbados Conference Services Ltd. (BCSL)

Construction
- Opened: 1994

Website
- www.lescbarbados.com

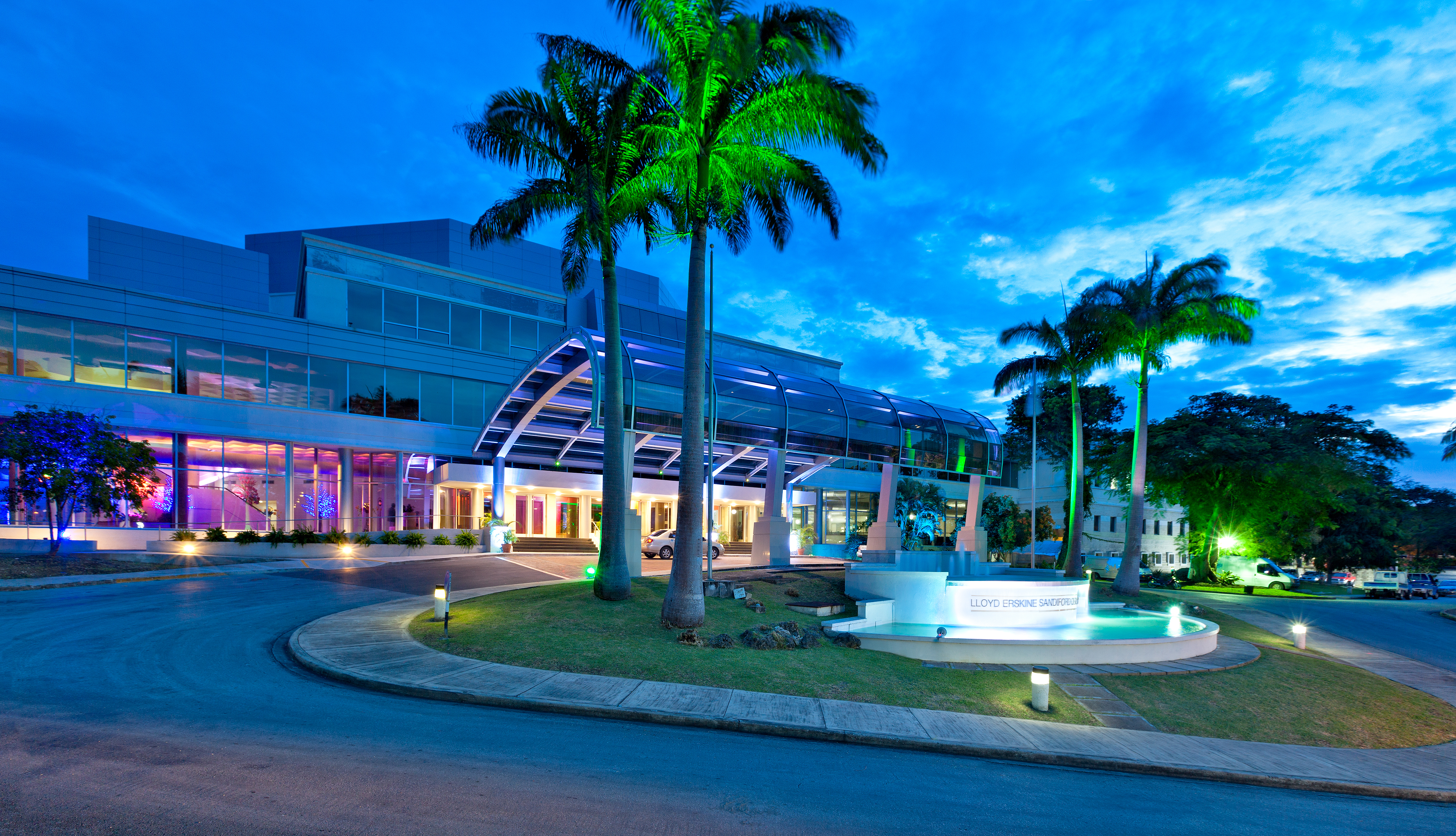
Lloyd Erskine Sandiford Centre Two Mile Hill St. Michael

The Lloyd Erskine Sandiford Centre (formerly known as the Sherbourne Conference Centre) is a conference centre facility on the Caribbean island of Barbados. Owned by the government of Barbados and managed by the government agency Barbados Conference Services Limited (BCSL), the Lloyd Erskine Sandiford Centre is just outside the capital city of Bridgetown, in St. Michael.

== Facility ==
First opened in 1994, the building contains a total of over 164,000 sq ft (15,200 m^{2}) of meeting space and is made up of space which may be subdivided for smaller events of between 50 and 1200 persons (theatre style).

When first constructed the building was considered too large by members of the opposition and construction on back portion of the facility halted just after a change in government. Many Calypsonians sung about the side of the facility (which contained a planned performing arts centre) as being "unfinished" or stating the facility had its "backside exposed". After a change in government in 2008, the semi-completed ~15-year-old auditorium was torn down to make way for office space and a carpark instead. This action was much to the condemnation of the former prime minister that spearheaded it, Sir Lloyd Erskine Sandiford.

=== Annual events ===
- Laff It Off Productions
- Caribbean Consumer Conference
- KLOTH Pop Up Event

=== Past major events ===
- The UN Global Conference on Sustainable Development for Small Island States
- The Caribbean Tourism Conference (CTC-20)
- The CARICOM Heads of Government Conference
- The US-CARICOM summit between US president Bill Clinton and the CARICOM heads of government
- Organization of American States (OAS)
- The UN World Conference Against Racism - African and African Descendants World Conference Against Racism.
- 2020 State Opening of second session of Parliament.
- UNCTAD-15 (2021)

== Awards ==
- 2003, 2004, 2005, 2006, 2008, 2009 - The "Caribbean's Leading Conference Centre" - by the World Travel Awards

== Naming ==
On 24 October 2008, the facility's original name of Sherbourne Conference Centre was changed to its present name in honour of Lloyd Erskine Sandiford, a former prime minister of Barbados.
