= Auditorio Benito Juarez (Los Mochis) =

Arena in Sinaloa, Mexico

Coordinates: 25.8005°N 108.9786°W

Auditorio Benito Juarez is a 2,500-seat indoor arena located in Los Mochis, Sinaloa, Mexico.

It is used primarily for basketball, boxing, lucha libre, concerts, and other events. With 2,500 square meters (26,900 square feet) of exhibit space it is also Los Mochis' largest indoor convention center, allowing it to also be used for trade shows, conventions and banquets.
