= Holywell Park Conference Centre =

Conference facility

Coordinates: 52.758512°N 1.245591°W

Holywell Park Conference Centre is modern conference facility located on Loughborough University Campus offering 300 m2 of exhibition space and accommodating up to 450 people. It was officially opened in April 2004 by The Duke of Edinburgh.

== History ==
Loughborough University purchased the National Grid plc technology park on Ashby Road Loughborough in 2003 for £35.5 million.

=== Holywell Park ===
The technology park was renamed Holywell Park and is home to a mix of Loughborough University academic schools and enterprise companies.

The park was built on the site of Holywell Hall, an area that was thought to contain a small hermitage, fishponds and moat. The Hall itself is now the location of a Grade II listed building Holywell Farm.

== Conference Centre ==
The Conference Centre is housed in the Sir Denis Rooke Building on Holywell Park, named after the British industrialist and engineer who was the Chancellor of Loughborough University from 1989 to 2003.

The venue is operated by the Universities hotel and conference subsidiary business Imago Venues

== Notable uses ==
=== London 2012 ===
==== Kitting out ====
The Conference Centre was the official location for the kitting out of Team GB for the 2012 Summer Olympics. 175,000 units of kit across 23 sizes were handed out to 550 athletes with the help of 450 support staff.

==== Torch Relay ====
Day 46 of the 2012 Summer Olympics torch relay ended at the Conference Centre, with torch bearers including Richard Whitehead (athlete) and Sophie Hitchon. Former England national rugby union team Head Coach and Loughborough University graduate Sir Clive Woodward met the Torch Relay at the Conference Centre.
