= Arusha International Conference Centre =

Conference venue in Tanzania

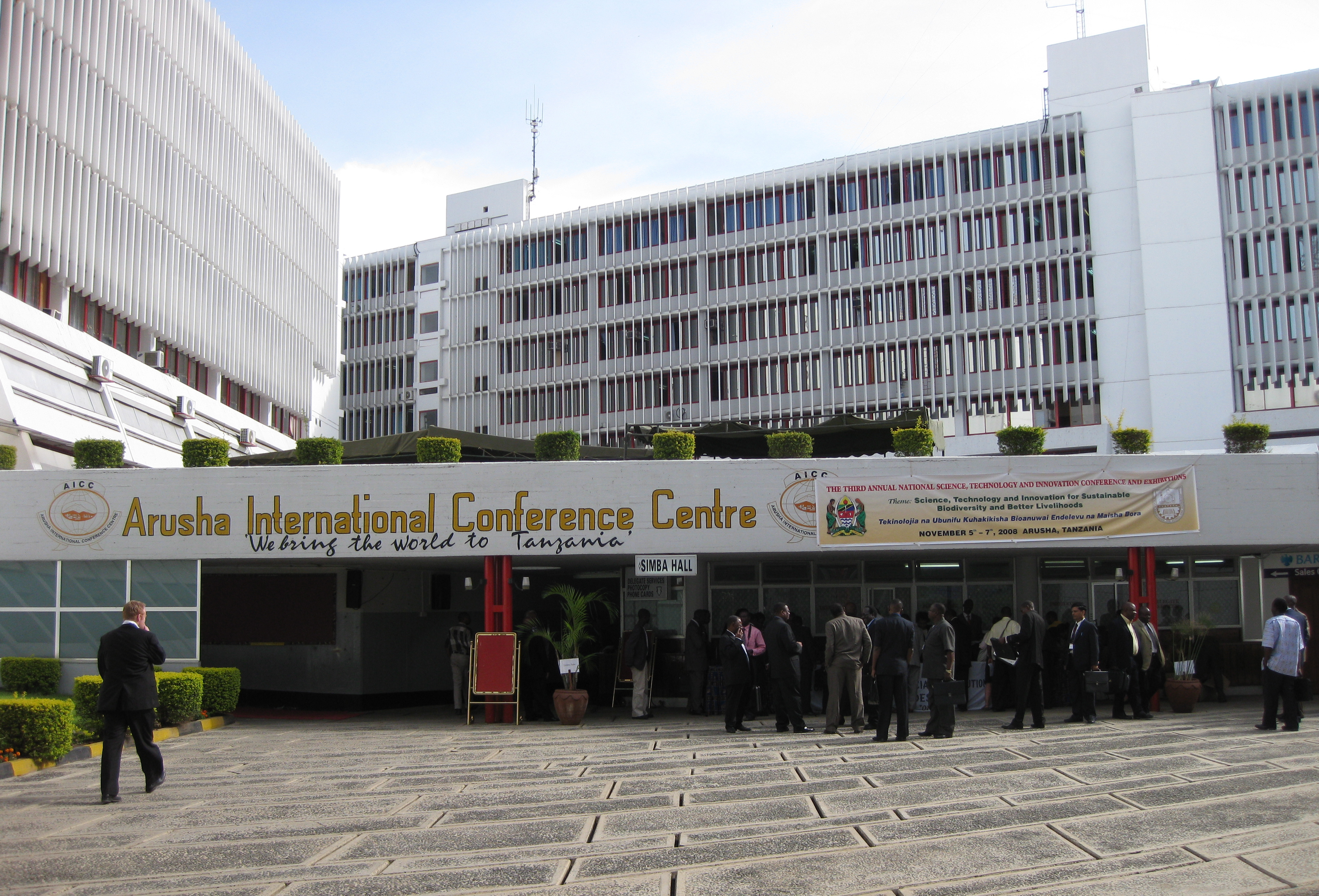
- Interactive map of Arusha International Conference Centre
- Former names: EAC Headquarters
- Address: East African Community Boulevard
- Location: Arusha, Tanzania
- Coordinates: 3°22′4″S 36°41′46″E
- Owner: Tanzanian Government (100%)
- Operator: Ministry of Foreign Affairs

Construction
- Opened: 1977

Website
- www.aicc.co.tz

The Arusha International Conference Centre (AICC) located in Arusha, is the leading conference venue in Tanzania. It is 100% owned by the Government of Tanzania; however, operating without receiving any subsidies.

It has a total of 10 meeting rooms which cater for conferences, workshops, seminars, and committee meetings, with a seating capacity of 10 to 1000 delegates. Most of these rooms are equipped with Simultaneous Interpretation Systems (SIS) which can handle up to 12 languages.

Major tenants include:

- The United Nations International Criminal Tribunal for Rwanda (UN-ICTR)
- The East African Community (EAC)
- African Union Advisory Board on Corruption (AUABC), which was established on 26 May 2009.

Simba Hall was expanded to accommodate 1,313 delegates from its former capacity of 1,000 for the 8th Sullivan Summit.

== Gallery ==
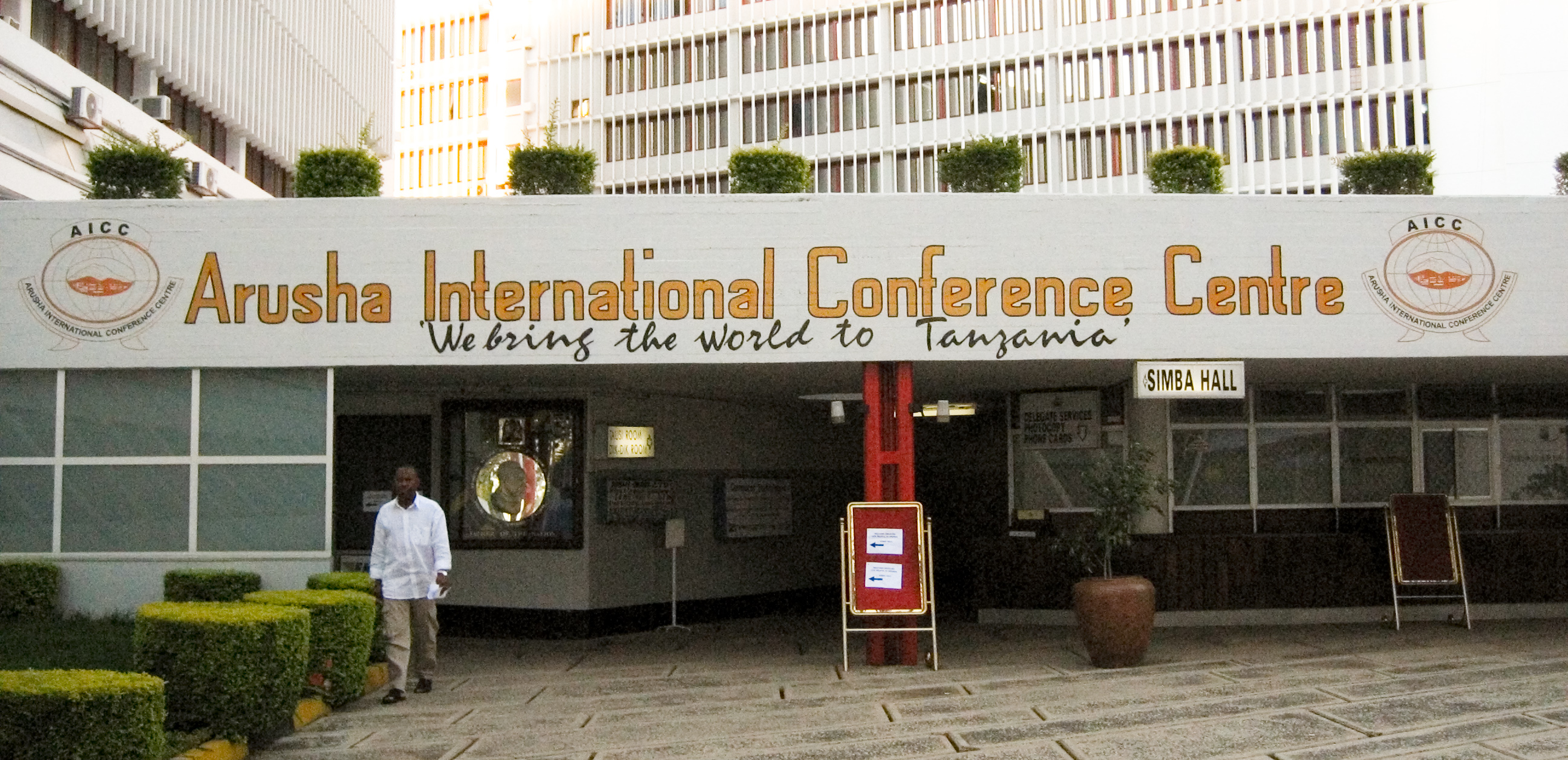
Main entrance

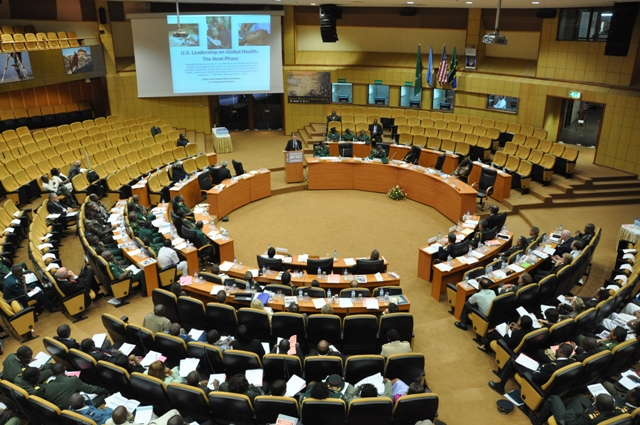
Simba Hall

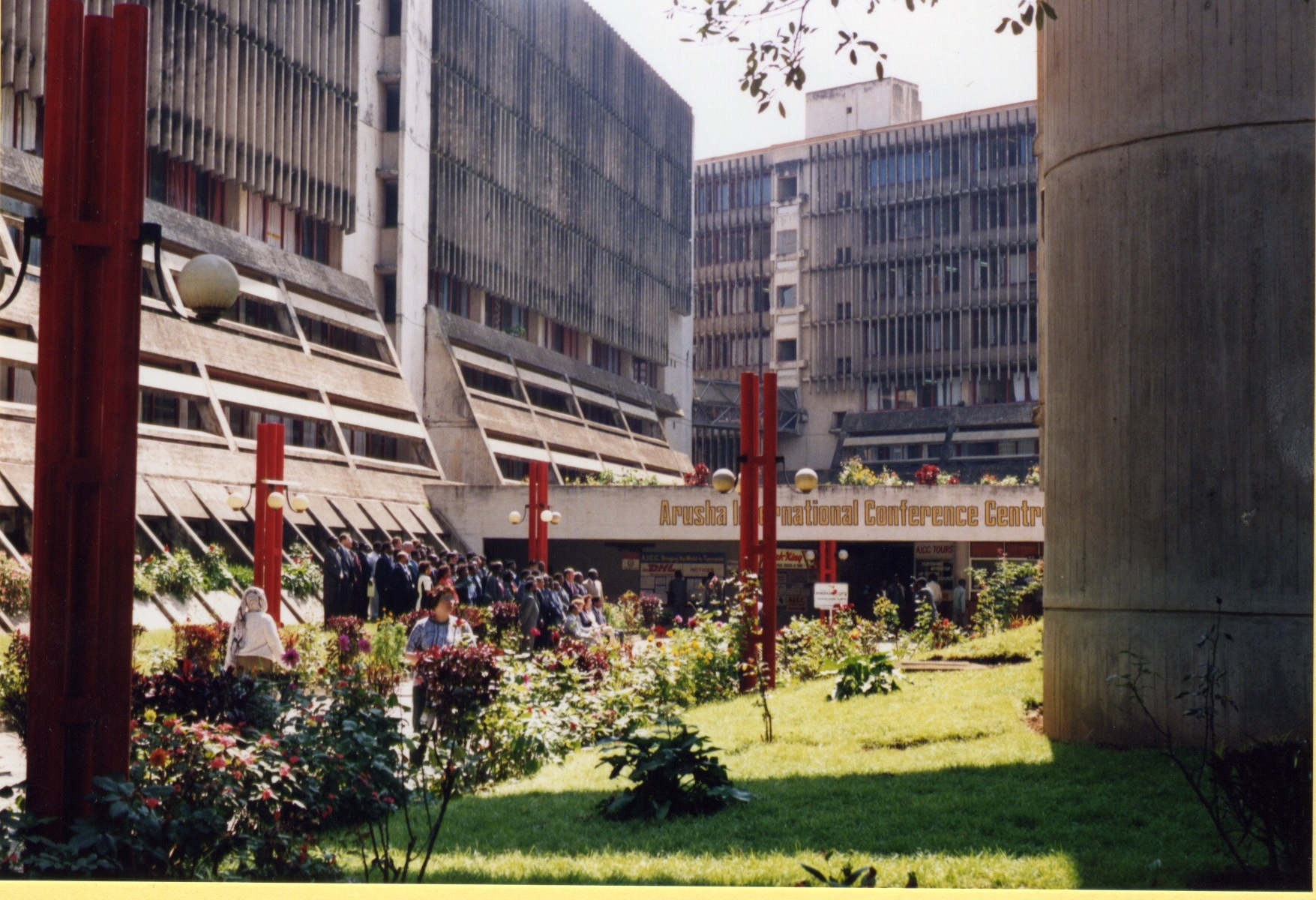
The entrance of the congress center, in July 1995.
