= TAITRONICS =

Annual trade show in Taiwan

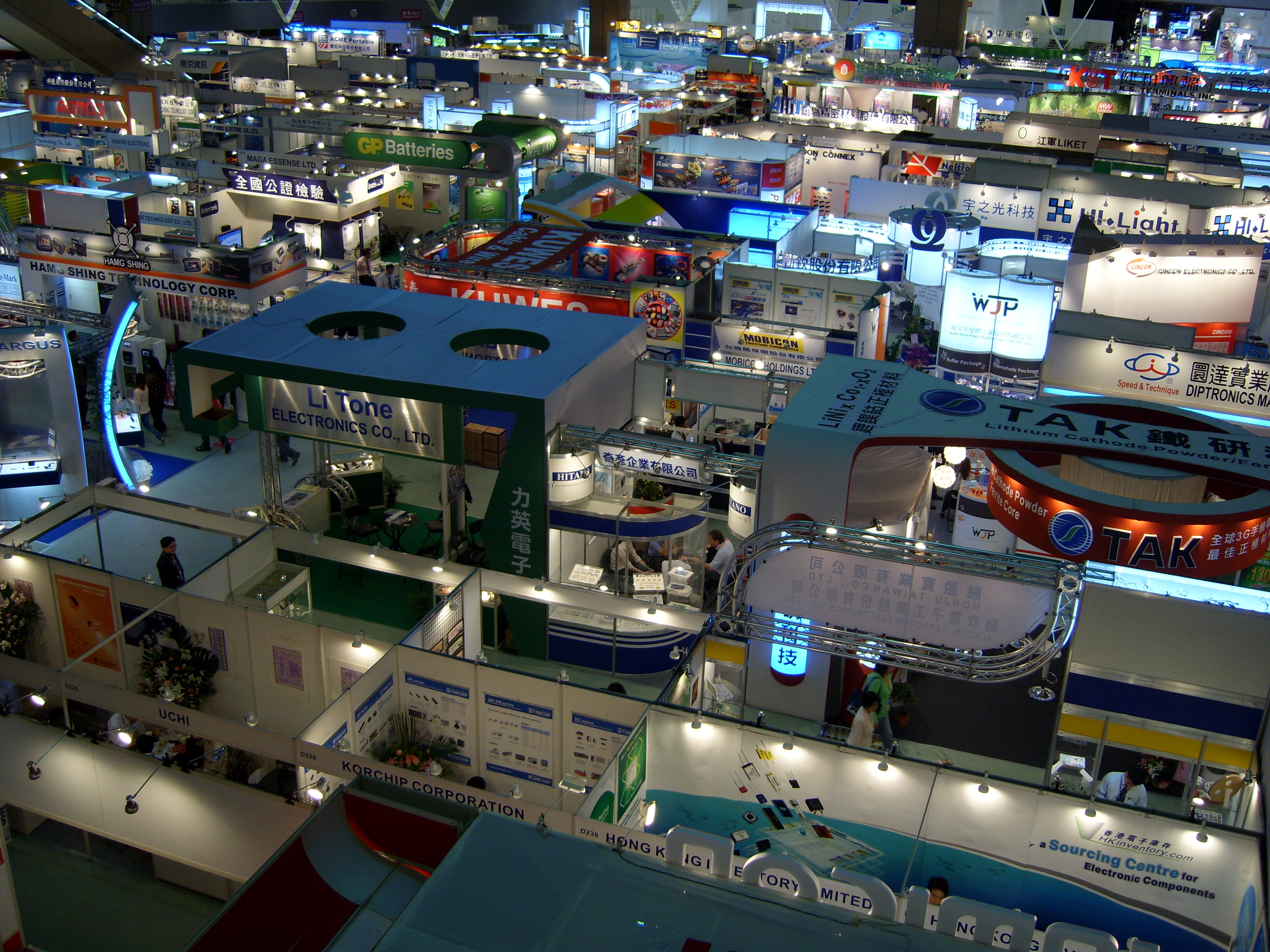
2007 TAITRONICS Autumn at Taipei World Trade Center

Taipei International Electronics Show (TAITRONICS; Chinese: 台北國際電子展) is a trade show held every October by Taiwan External Trade Development Council and Taiwan Electrical and Electronic Manufacturers' Association to promote electronic industry in Taiwan since 1974.

After entering the Taipei World Trade Center in 1986, the TAITRONICS held every spring and autumn with different topics. Initially, the spring show before 1994 was ever named with Taipei International Electrical Equipment Show. In addition, TAITRA made an initiation on DVD and optoelectronic show from 2001 to 2005.

With a rapid change in electronic industry, some subsidiary shows confronted to be combined and suspended. In 2006, the TAITRA priory repackaged Taipei Opto and TAITRONICS Spring with AutoTronics Taipei (Taipei International Automobile Electronics Show) and DigiTronics Taipei, to adapt trendy changes on electronic industry. Afterward, the Taipei Computer Association also suspended "Taipei Telecom", a 14-year-old telecommunication show, with quality issue and category duplications with TICA (Taipei Computer Applications Show) since 2001.

In the presence, only the AutoTronics Taipei can be held sustainably in conjunction with two auto shows - Taipei AMPA (Taipei International Auto Parts & Accessories Show) and Motorcycle Taiwan (Taiwan International Motorcycle Industry Show) every spring since 2007.

Not only the main show every October, the TAITRA also promotes this show brand successively to help the ICT and electronic industries expanding in Thailand and India since 2006. In addition, the TAITRA will schedule the other three related shows - TaiwanRFID (Taiwan International Radio Frequency Identification Applications Show), PV Taiwan (Taiwan International Photovoltaic Forum & Exhibition), and Broadband Taiwan (Taiwan International Broadband Communications Show) in 2008 after moving this major show into TWTC Nangang.

In the year 2013, the 39th Taipei International Electronics Show (Taitronics 2013) will be held again at Taipei World Trade Center Nangang Exhibition Hall (TWTC Nangang) on October 8 to 11 October 2013.

The 39th Taipei International Electronics Show (Taitronics 2013) will focus on electronic components, batteries & power supplies, LED components & applications, meters & instruments, process & manufacturing, wires & cables, consumer electronics, safety & security and RFID equipment & applications.

== Sub-shows ==
=== Current ===
- AutoTronics Taipei
- TaiwanRFID
- PV Taiwan
- Broadband Taiwan
- TAITRONICS Bangkok (overseas show in Thailand)
- TAITRONICS India (overseas show in India)

=== Suspended ===
- TAITRONICS spring (1994 - 2005)
- DigiTronics Taipei (2006 & 2007)
- Taipei Opto (2001 - 2005)
- Taipei Telecom (1992 - 2006)
- TAITRONICS - components and equipments (1998 - 2004)
- TAITRONICS - finished products (1998 - 2004)
- Taipei International Electrical Equipment Show (1986 - 2003)

== See also ==
- Taipei Trade Shows
- COMPUTEX Taipei - mainly for ICT industry
