= Computex =

Taiwanese annual computer technology trade fair

COMPUTEX Taipei
- COMPUTEX Taipei logo since 2010

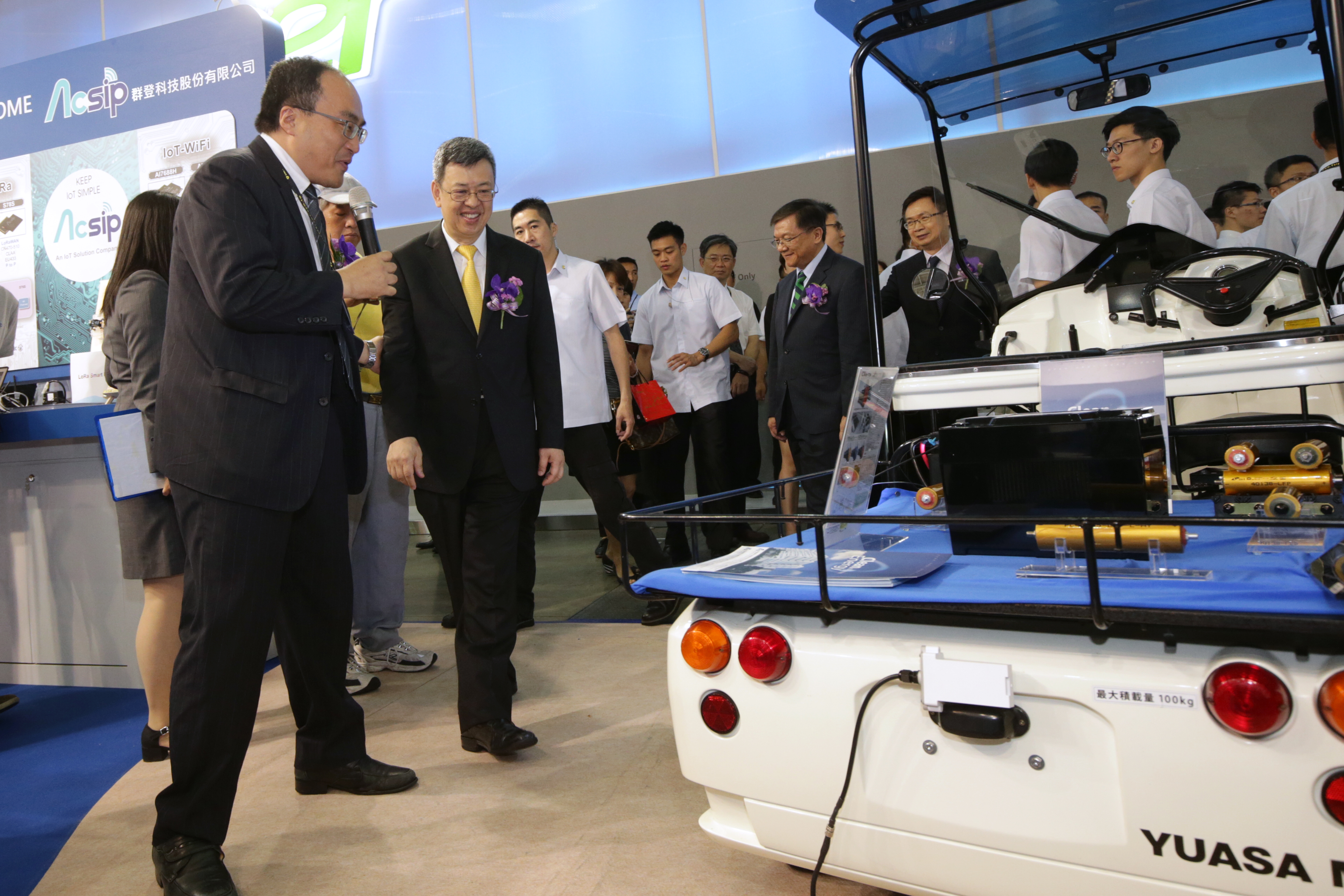
- Attendees at Computex Taipei 2017
- Status: Active
- Genre: computer expo
- Venue: Taipei World Trade Center (TWTC) Exhibition Hall, Taipei World Trade Center Nangang Exhibition Hall
- Locations: Taipei, Taiwan
- Inaugurated: 1981
- Most recent: June 2 to 5, 2026
- Next event: June 1 to 4, 2027
- Organizer: Taiwan External Trade Development Council and Taipei Computer Association
- Website: computextaipei.com.tw

COMPUTEX Taipei, or Taipei International Information Technology Show (Chinese: 台北國際電腦展; pinyin: Táiběi Guójì Diànnǎo Zhǎn), is a computer expo held annually in Taipei, Taiwan. Since the early 2000s, it is one of the largest computer and technology trade shows in the world.

The most recent COMPUTEX was held from June 2 to 5, 2026 with sessions about such topics as AI servers, edge computing, robotics, automation, smart mobility, next-generation communications, and immersive technologies.

COMPUTEX 2020 was cancelled after a delay from early June to 28 September due to public health safety concerns of the COVID-19 pandemic.

COMPUTEX is co-organized by government-funded Taiwan External Trade Development Council (TAITRA) and private sector Taipei Computer Association (TCA). The first expo, then called Taipei Computer Show, was held in 1981 and started out as a place where small and medium-sized businesses in Taiwan's nascent computer industry could display their products. Stan Shih, a former head of the TCA, proposed to change to the current name in the fourth expo. As Taiwan's information technology industry took off in the early 1990s and as the Foreign Trade Council Display Hall in Taipei Songshan Airport was put back into use in the eighth and ninth expo, COMPUTEX has since rapidly expanded and become an important showcase for the IT industry globally. On 28 November 2018 (the same day that Deutsche Messe AG announced that there would not be a 2019 CeBIT), it became the largest computer expo in the world, with participation from major manufacturers such as Intel, AMD, NVIDIA, and others, as well as Taiwanese brand names such as Acer and ASUS.

The 2026 event, held June 2-5 in Taipei, was focused heavily on AI and the technologies that run behind the models, with Nvidia as a large part of that.

== Venues ==
=== Beginning ===
The precedent of COMPUTEX in 1981, was held in the Songshan Airport Exhibition Hall. In 1986, the Taipei World Trade Center (TWTC) Exhibition Hall on Xinyi Road of Taipei City was used for COMPUTEX for the first time and continues to be the major location for the expo since then. Then following the rise in the demands for more stands and halls, the Taipei International Convention Center, the Taipei World Trade 2nd and 3rd Hall opens successively to meet the demand. After the opening of the International Convention Center opens, major companies such as Intel, Texas Instruments, etc. joined expo. Then companies such as ASUS, and Acer joined the expo after the opening of the TWTC 2nd Hall.

=== Reopening of Taipei Songshan Airport Exhibition Hall ===
In 1989, due to the shortcoming of the expo grounds, the Foreign Trade Council Exhibition Hall was put back into use. Yet there is still a shortage of space, and several major companies have to resort to using a single stand to display their products, bringing down the expo quality. The second year, 1990, the sponsors split up the display content into inland sales and foreign sales to solve the falling quality problem. The inland sales part was canceled in 1991, and transformed into the Taipei Computer Application Show in the August of the same year.

=== Opening of the New Exhibition Hall ===
After the show return to pure foreign sales route, it triggered increase in hotel reservations. After which, several companies start to search for a better environment in the neighborhood. Thus setting their eyes on the Grand Hyatt Taipei close by, which offered a good place with a comparatively low rental fee. And that caused the effect that due to company rental, the Grand Hyatt Taipei always run out of rooms during the expo period.

In 1995, the Taipei International Convention Center officially became part of the expo ground. This enticed some international companies such as Intel to join the expo. On top of that, due to the floor distribution, some large-scale seminars also transferred their display into the exhibition. Furthermore, the sponsoring group gathers the companies that have great potentials to display their product in the same floor in order to improve their impressions. Then, in 2000, after the Taipei World Trade 2nd Exhibition Hall joined the expo, major motherboard-producing companies continued to join the expo. And in 2002, the sponsors released several stands to semiconductor foundries.

But in 2003, due to the worldwide panic on SARS, the expo was on the fringe of canceling. Yet, following the agreement of the company, sponsor and medias, the expo was delayed to September, in sync to the completion of the A21 Exhibition Hall (Taipei World Trade 3rd Exhibition Hall). Along with the work that allows the participating companies to transfer to the new Exhibition Hall, there was the shrink in the crowd from the CeBIT Asia previously. That which caused the number of people coming to this expo to increase dramatically. And it is from then on, after 2004, the tradition of having all four exhibition halls (1st, 2nd, 3rd Taipei World Trade Exhibition Hall, and the Taipei International Convention Center) to open simultaneously, raising the Computex Taipei to become the 2nd largest computer and technology fairs in the world.

=== Expo outside of expo continued ===
Even though after 1995, new exhibition halls opens up and extending the expo display grounds, companies will still consider using the nearby shopping malls and hotels for better negotiation space. Now, other than the Grand Hyatt Taipei, companies are known to rent the openings around New York New York (NYNY) Shopping Center and Vieshow Cinemas for their activities. This allows the crowds unable to enter the expo to be able to absorb new information about the products been displayed inside the expo. Sometimes companies even reserved whole cafe and/or fast food restaurants so the buyers are able to take a break in them.

=== The Opening of the Nangang Exhibition Hall ===
In 2008, the newly constructed TWTC Nangang Exhibition Hall entered as the latest addition to the ever expanding COMPUTEX venues, which now also include TWTC Exhibition Hall 1 and 3 and the Taipei International Convention Center on Xinyi Road, with more than 100,000 square meters of gross exhibit space.

== History and figures ==
COMPUTEX History and Figures
| Year | Dates | Notes |
|---|---|---|
| 1981 | N/A | The first Taipei Computer Show (predecessor of Computex) was held in the Songshan Airport Exhibition Hall. |
| 1984 | N/A | The expo was officially named COMPUTEX. |
| 1986 | N/A | Moved to the newly built TWTC Exhibition Hall on Xinyi Road for the first time. |
| 2003 | September (Postponed) | Postponed from June due to the SARS outbreak. Became the second largest IT trade show in the world in terms of exhibitors and visitors. |
| 2004 | 1–5 June 2004 | Figures: 1,347 exhibitors, 118,052 visitors, 58,730 sq. meters of exhibit space. |
| 2005 | 31 May–4 June 2005 | Added a new feature: "Buyer's Day." |
| 2006 | 6–10 June 2006 | Normal annual event. |
| 2007 | 5–9 June 2007 | Normal annual event. |
| 2008 | 3–7 June 2008 | Expanded to include the TWTC Nangang Exhibition Hall. |
| 2009 | 2–6 June 2009 | Normal annual event. |
| 2010 | 1–5 June 2010 | Normal annual event. |
| 2011 | 31 May–4 June 2011 | Normal annual event. |
| 2012 | 5–9 June 2012 | Normal annual event. |
| 2013 | 4–8 June 2013 | Normal annual event. |
| 2014 | 3–7 June 2014 | Normal annual event. |
| 2015 | 2–5 June 2015 | Normal annual event. |
| 2016 | 31 May–4 June 2016 | Normal annual event. |
| 2017 | 30 May–3 June 2017 | Normal annual event. |
| 2018 | 5–9 June 2018 | Normal annual event. |
| 2019 | 28 May–1 June 2019 | Normal annual event. |
| 2020 | N/A | Scheduled for September (delayed from June) due to COVID-19 pandemic in Taiwan; event was cancelled. |
| 2021 | N/A | Held online-only as COMPUTEX 2021 Virtual. |
| 2022 | 24–27 May 2022 | Held in-person. |
| 2023 | 30 May–2 June 2023 | Held in-person. |
| 2024 | 4–7 June 2024 | Held in-person. |
| 2025 | 20–23 May 2025 | Most recent event listed. |
| 2026 | 2–6 June 2026 | Scheduled event. |

== See also ==
- CeBIT (Hanover, Germany, defunct)
- CES (Las Vegas, Nevada, USA)
- Mobile World Congress (Barcelona, Spain)
- GITEX (Dubai, UAE)
