= 14th Congress =

14th Congress may refer to:

- 14th Congress of the All-Union Communist Party (Bolsheviks) (1925)
- 14th Congress of the League of Communists of Yugoslavia (1990)
- 14th Congress of the Philippines (2007–2010)
- 14th National Congress of the Chinese Communist Party (1992)
- 14th National Congress of the Communist Party of Vietnam (2026)
- 14th National Congress of the Kuomintang (1993)
- 14th National People's Congress (2023–present)
- 14th United States Congress (1815–1817)
