= Taiwan Automation Intelligence and Robot Show =

Annual robotics trade show in Taiwan

Taiwan Automation Intelligence and Robot Show 台灣機器人與智慧自動化展
- Status: Active
- Genre: Trade Show
- Frequency: Annual
- Venue: Taipei Nangang Exhibition Center
- Country: Taiwan
- Inaugurated: 2008; 18 years ago
- Most recent: August 19, 2026; 2 months ago
- Next event: August 4, 2027; 9 months' time
- Organiser: Taiwan External Trade Development Council
- Website: https://www.tairos.tw/en/

Taiwan Automation Intelligence and Robot Show (TAIROS) is an annual robotics trade show organized by Taiwan External Trade Development Council. The show is held every summer at the Taipei Nangang Exhibition Center since 2008 and it aims to promote industrial automation, smart manufacturing, 3D printing, lasers, cold chain technology, and robotics technology. The exhibition aims to serve as a major networking platform for industry professionals, researchers and government agencies. In 2026, the event attracted roughly 1,200 exhibitors from 16 countries and regions.

== See also ==
- Automotive industry in Taiwan
- Automechanika
