= Taiwan Trade Shows =

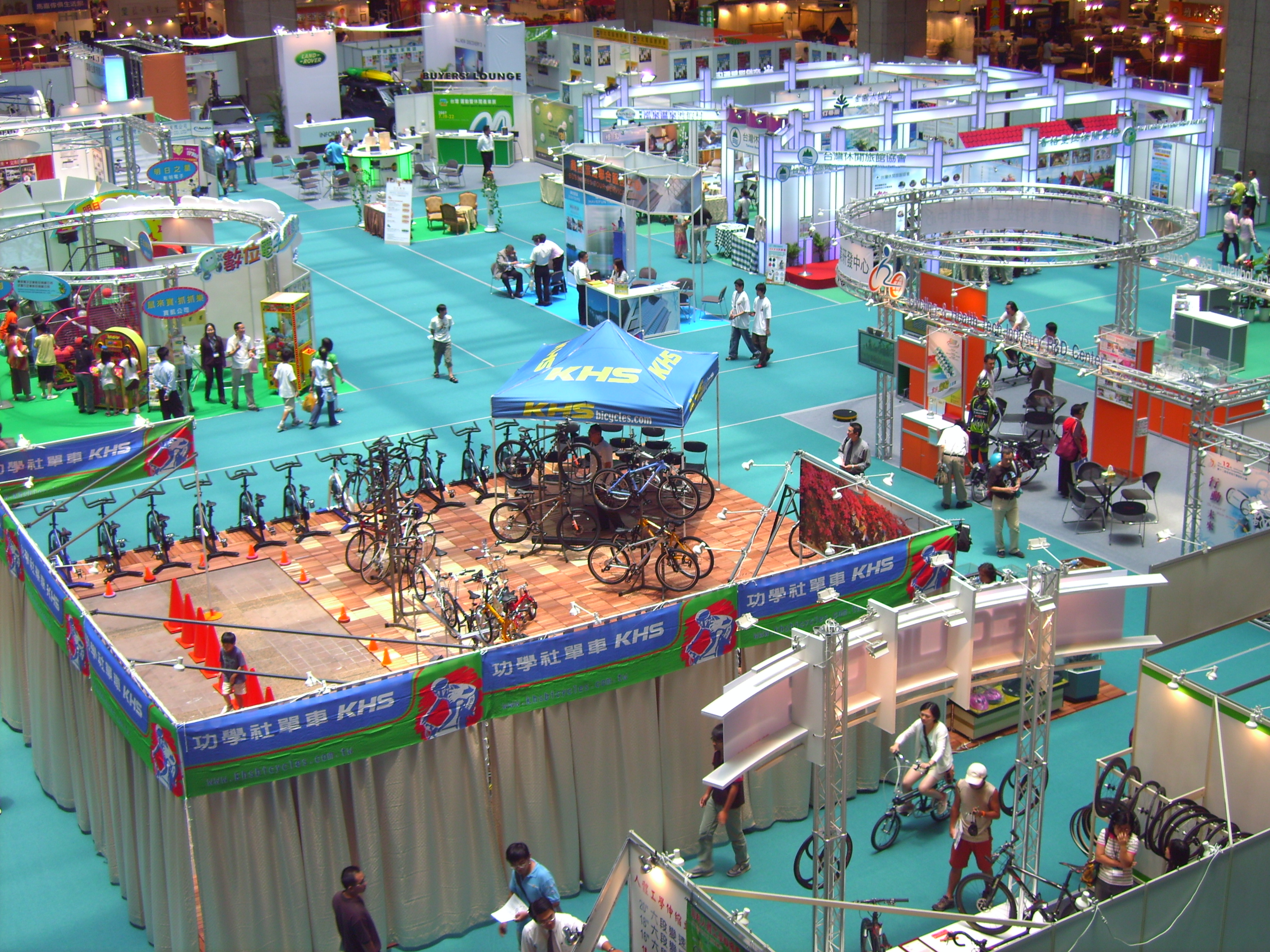
Leisure Taiwan 2007

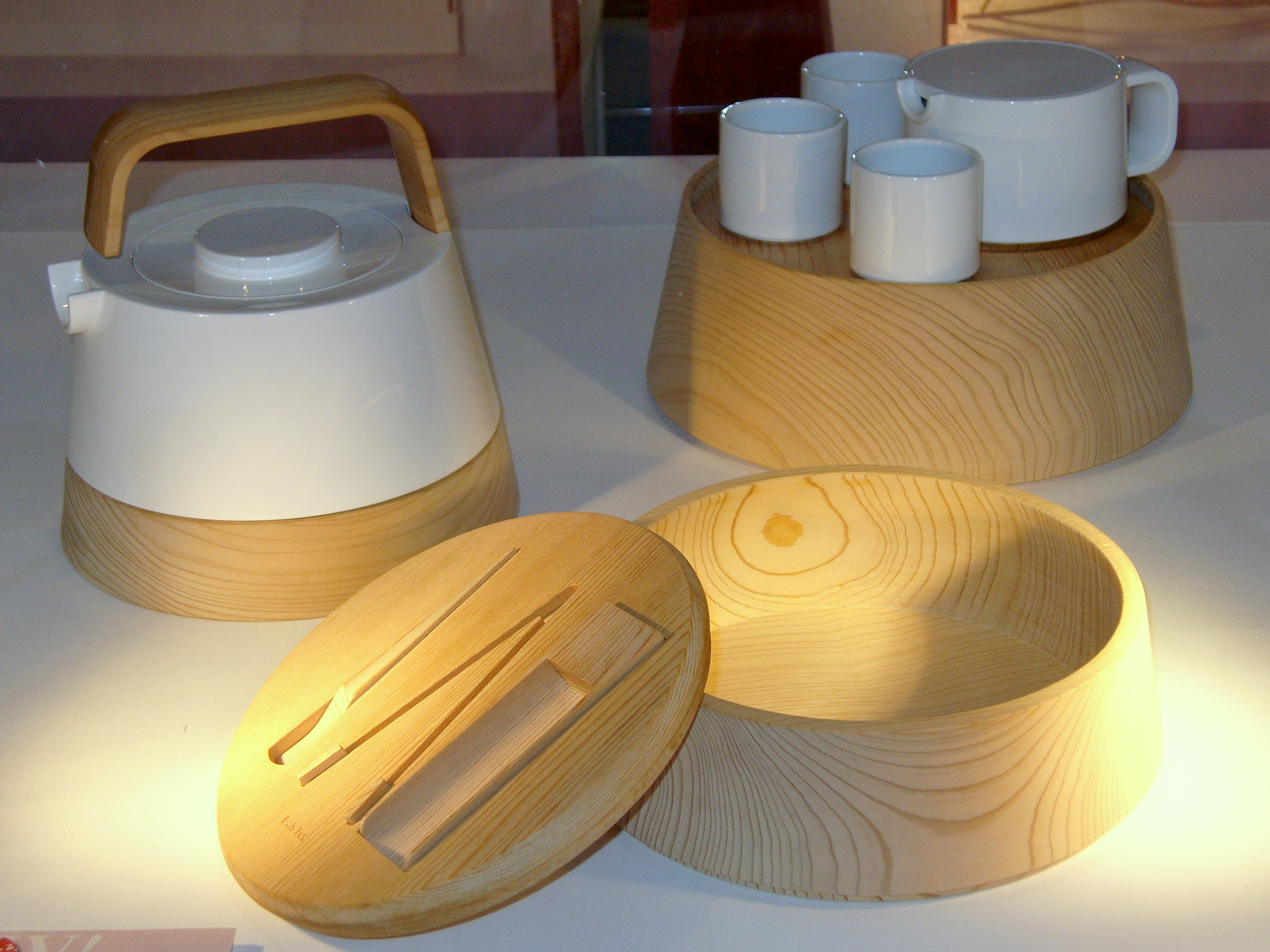
2008 YODEX - Wow Taiwan Design Award: EasTea / WesTea

Taiwan Trade Shows (marketed internationally as "Taipei Trade Shows" before 2012) is a series of trade exhibitions organized by TAITRA in Taipei, Taiwan. It is based on the Taiwan Clothes Export Mart Exhibition first held in September 1974. Currently, TAITRA organizes a number of annual trade shows including COMPUTEX, Taipei Cycle, and TAITRONICS at the Taipei World Trade Center.

== List of Taiwan Trade Shows ==
=== Current ===
- COMPUTEX Taipei
- Fastener Taiwan
- FOOD TAIPEI
- Foodtech & Pharmatech TAIPEI
- Furniture Taipei
- Giftionery Taipei
- METICARE TAIWAN
- Mediphar Taipei
- Motorcycle Taiwan
- Semicon Taiwan
- SENCARE
- Taipei Aerospace & Defense Technology Exhibition
- TaiSPO
- Taipei Cycle
- Taipei AMPA
- TaiHerbs
- Taipei International Machine Tool Show
- TAIPEI PACK
- Taipei PLAS
- TAITRONICS Series
  - Autotronics Taipei
  - TAITRONICS India
  - TAITRONICS Taipei
- Taiwan Automation Intelligence and Robot Show
- TAIWAN BOAT SHOW
- HALAL TAIWAN
- Laundry Taiwan
- Taiwan HORECA
- TAIWAN SOUVENIR
- TIMTOS
- YODEX (Young Designers' Exhibition)

=== Suspended ===
- Leisure Taiwan (suspended since 2012)
- TICA (Taipei Computer Applications Show, domestic market show, suspended since 2017)
- TAITRONICS Series
  - ~~DigiTronics Taipei~~ (suspended since 2008)
  - ~~TAITRONICS Bangkok~~ (suspended since 2009)
