= 15th Congress =

15th Congress may refer to:

- 15th Congress of the All-Union Communist Party (Bolsheviks) (1927)
- 15th Congress of the Philippines (2010–2013)
- 15th National Congress of the Chinese Communist Party (1997)
- 15th National Congress of the Kuomintang (1997)
- 15th People's Party of Kazakhstan Extraordinary Congress (2020)
- 15th United States Congress (1817–1819)
