= Acer Stream =

Smartphone manufactured by Acer Inc.

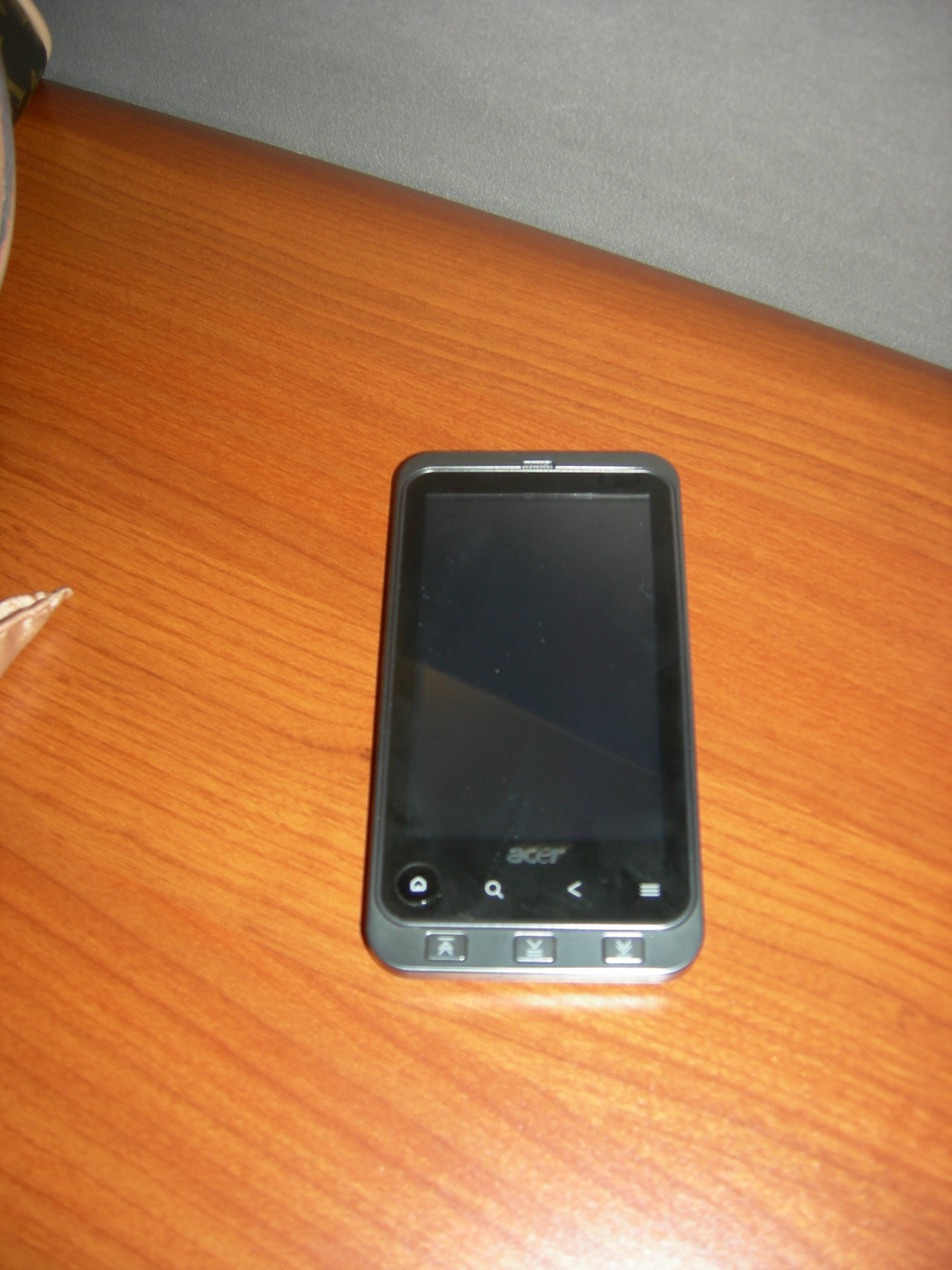
- Manufacturer: Acer Inc.
- Availability by region: August 2010
- Dimensions: 119.5×63×11.2 mm (4.70×2.48×0.44 in)
- Weight: 140 g (5 oz)
- Operating system: Android 2.1 “Eclair”
- CPU: 1GHz Qualcomm Snapdragon processor
- Rear camera: 5 MP autofocus
- Display: 3.7” AMOLED capacitive multi-touchscreen

The Acer Stream is a smartphone manufactured by Acer Inc. and powered by the Android 2.1 operating system. It has 3.7” AMOLED capacitive multi-touchscreen. It was announced at Computex 2010.

== Hardware ==
The smartphone is shipped with the Android 2.1 "Eclair" operating system. It features a 3.7-inch AMOLED capacitive touchscreen with WVGA resolution, 5-megapixel camera capable with automatic geotagging supported by the integrated Assisted GPS antenna and digital compass.

The device is upgradable and powered by a Qualcomm Snapdragon 1 gigahertz processor and 512 megabytes random access memory. It also has 512 megabytes of read-only memory alongside its 2 gigabytes internal memory backed up with a microSD card slot capable of offering up to 32 gigabytes of expandable storage memory with 8 gigabytes included respectively.

Acer Stream support 720p video streaming via mini-HDMI port and Dolby Mobile.

== Software ==
The Acer Stream runs the Android operating system and integrated third party applications such as Facebook and Twitter social networks, and photo and video sharing abilities through Flickr and YouTube respectively. Other applications available include full HTML browser abilities for the Web, Google Search, Maps] and Mail respectively, and a document viewer which opens Microsoft Office and PDF documents.

=== Acer Spinlet ===
"Acer spinlet" is a pre-installed application to browse and listen to songs for free that can be instantly played back on the handset or shared with social networks such as Facebook or Twitter.

=== Acer urFooz ===
"Acer urFooz" is a pre-installed application to create a virtual lookalike to post on social networks

== Software updates ==
The Android 2.2 (FroYo) update was released.

== See also ==
- List of Android devices
- Galaxy Nexus
