= Taiwan International Fastener Show =

Fastener Taiwan Taiwan International Fastener Show
- Status: Active
- Genre: Fastener expo
- Venue: Kaohsiung Arena, Hanshin Arena
- Location: Kaohsiung
- Country: Taiwan
- Inaugurated: 2010
- Most recent: Present
- Attendance: 1,500 overseas buyers, 16,500 local professionals
- Organizer: TAITRA, TIFI

Taiwan International Fastener Show (Fastener Taiwan; Chinese: 台灣國際扣件展) is one of the world's largest professional trade fairs focused on the fastener industry. It takes place biennially in the Kaohsiung Arena in Kaohsiung, Taiwan. The show is organized jointly by TAITRA, Taiwan External Trade Development Council, and TIFI, Taiwan Industrial Fastener Institute.

Among its counterparts, the National Industrial Fastener Shows in Las Vegas, and the Fastener Fair Stuttgart, Fastener Taiwan stands out as the only professional show providing for personal visits to manufacturing sites directly after the show. Around 44% of firms in the industry are located in the area near Kaohsiung, which accounts for the choice of the arena as fairground.

The 2012 show was held from 13 to 14 March 2012, it had been open to all interested in the field.

== Industry history in Taiwan ==
Burgeoning roughly in the 1950s, fastener industry in Taiwan has over sixty years history of development. The first bloom of Taiwanese firms came during the Vietnam War, as they were commissioned to supply fastener products to the United States Army. Later, the appreciation of the Japanese Yen in the 1970s further prompted the shifting of orders from Japan to Taiwan, fueling industry growth in the ensuing years.

Today, Taiwan ranks among top five world's fastener suppliers, accounting for 13% of the global production, and is the largest exporter to North America with US$1.1 billion worth of exports annually.

== Background of the show ==
The event was held for the first time in 2010 in response to calls from the industry, as exports continue to grow at a rate of approximately 4.7%, amounting to NT$99.9 billion in 2008.

== See also ==
- Fastener
- Taipei Trade Shows
- Taiwan External Trade Development Council
