= World Trade Center Taichung =

Convention center in Xitun, Taichung, Taiwan

World Trade Center Taichung 台中世界貿易中心
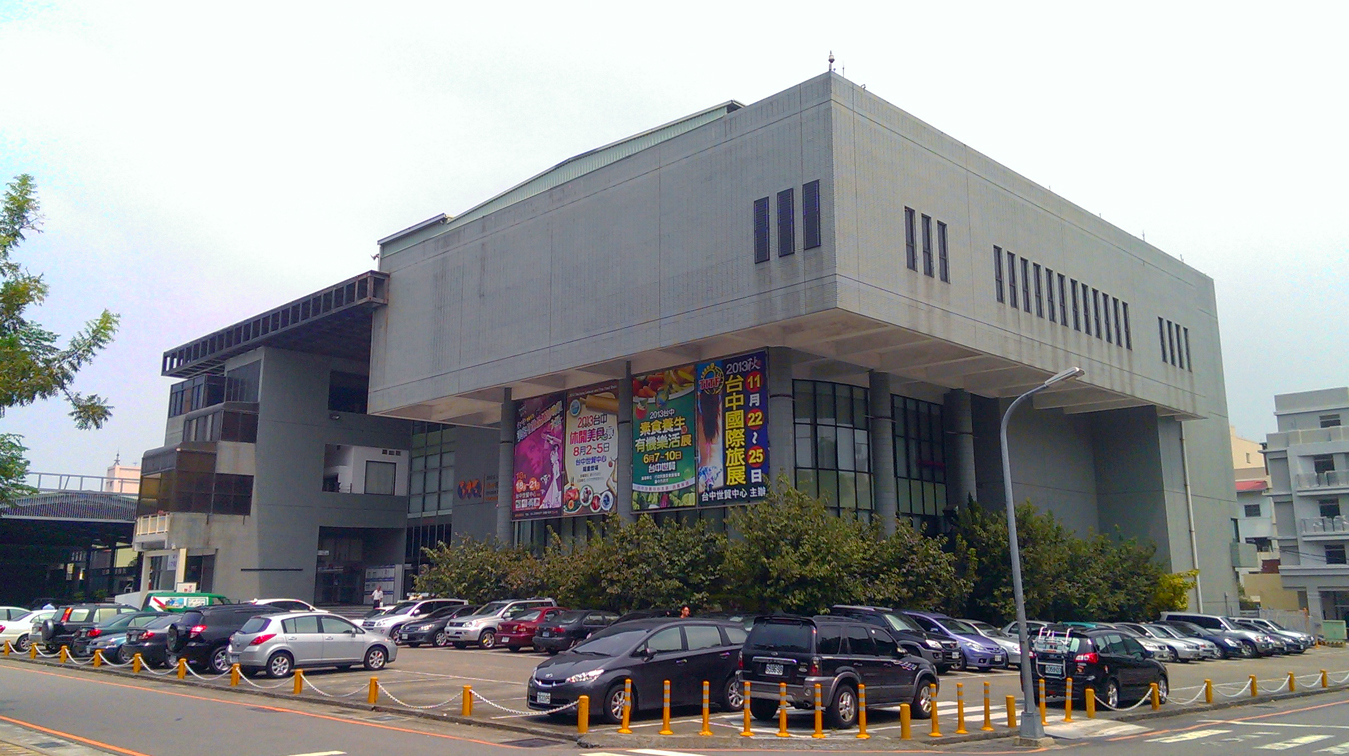
- Interactive map of World Trade Center Taichung 台中世界貿易中心
- Location: Xitun, Taichung, Taiwan
- Coordinates: 24°10′34.2″N 120°36′59.5″E

Construction
- Opened: 1988

Website
- Official website

The World Trade Center Taichung (WTC Taichung; traditional Chinese: 台中世界貿易中心; simplified Chinese: 台中世界贸易中心; pinyin: Táizhōng Shìjiè Màoyì Zhōngxīn) is a World Trade Center in Xitun District, Taichung, Taiwan.

== History ==
WTC Taichung was established in 1988 by the Importers and Exporters Association of Taichung, Industrial Association of Taichung, Taichung Chamber of Commerce, Importers and Exporters Association of Taiwan, Taichung City Government, Taichung City Council and China External Trade Development Council. At the 1990 World Trade Centers Association (WTCA) General Assembly in São Paulo, Brazil, WTC Taichung became the second WTC in Taiwan after Taipei World Trade Center to join WTCA.

== Architecture ==
The convention center consists of two exhibition hall. The first exhibition hall is capable of accommodating 95 booths and the second exhibition hall is capable of accommodating 151 booths.

== See also ==
- Greater Taichung International Expo Center
- Taipei World Trade Center
- List of convention centers in Taiwan
- List of tourist attractions in Taiwan
