= How to Start a Business in Taiwan =

2013 book by Elias Ek

- First edition
- Author: Elias Ek
- Cover artist: Roma Mehta
- Language: English
- Subject: Business Development, Entrepreneurship, Investment
- Genre: Non-fiction,
- Publisher: Enspyre
- Publication date: January 2013
- Publication place: Taiwan
- Pages: 325 pp
- ISBN: 978-986-89260-0-4

How to Start a Business in Taiwan is a 2013 book by Elias Ek, a Swedish entrepreneur and writer. The book covers the main areas of information that a foreigner living in Taiwan who wants to set up a business or invest in a Taiwanese business needs to know. Launched during the 2013 Taipei International Book Exhibition (Jan 30-Feb 4, 2013), the book was very well received by both customers and society. The very first copy was handed over to Taiwan President Ma Ying-jeou (馬英九), who said he hoped the book would help bring more foreign investors to Taiwan.

Author Elias Ek says the book is not about how to start a successful business but how to successfully start a business in Taiwan. This book covers Taiwan-specific issues like:

- - An introduction to doing business in Taiwan
- - A guide to doing business in Taiwan
- - Staffing your business in Taiwan
- - Picking the correct business entity
- - Registering your business
- - Financing your business in Taiwan
- - Overview of the legal systems, trademarks and patents
- - Interviews with successful foreign entrepreneurs in Taiwan

Ek says his ambition in writing the book is "that when you hire an accountant to do the paperwork, you know the questions to ask. You would be able to point to a Chinese term and say: ’Is that what you are talking about?’ So you can get on the same page easier. My second ambition is that you could also do the whole process on your own."

The well-read blog InTaiwan.de recommended the book but suggested the section about pensions was utterly confusing, and some chapters were out of order.

The government-sponsored 100 Innovators show on radio station Uni FM interviewed Ek, and the journalist Lilian Kim called Ek one of Taiwan's most successful foreign entrepreneurs.

== Background ==
Author Elias Ek is from Sweden but has lived in Taiwan since 2000. In 2002 he co-founded the B2B Marketing company Enspyre. While building his business, he has also spent a lot of time supporting foreign entrepreneurs. In 2006 Enspyre sponsored what was probably the first seminar for foreign entrepreneurs, and in 2008 Ek became the co-chair of the European Chamber of Commerce Taipei SME Centre, spending 3 years arranging seminars and workshops. He is currently active in a similar capacity at the French Chamber of Commerce.

In January 2011, Ek was at the Bangkok airport and discovered a book for foreigners about how to set up a business in Thailand. He was inspired to write such a book for Taiwan as well. Despite assembling a great team of interns to help, it took two years to make the book a reality.

Ek has also invested in many other Taiwanese startups and was one of the initiative takers to bring Startup Weekend to Taiwan.
