= Greater Taichung International Expo Center =

Convention center in Wuri, Taichung, Taiwan

Greater Taichung International Expo Center 大台中國際會展中心
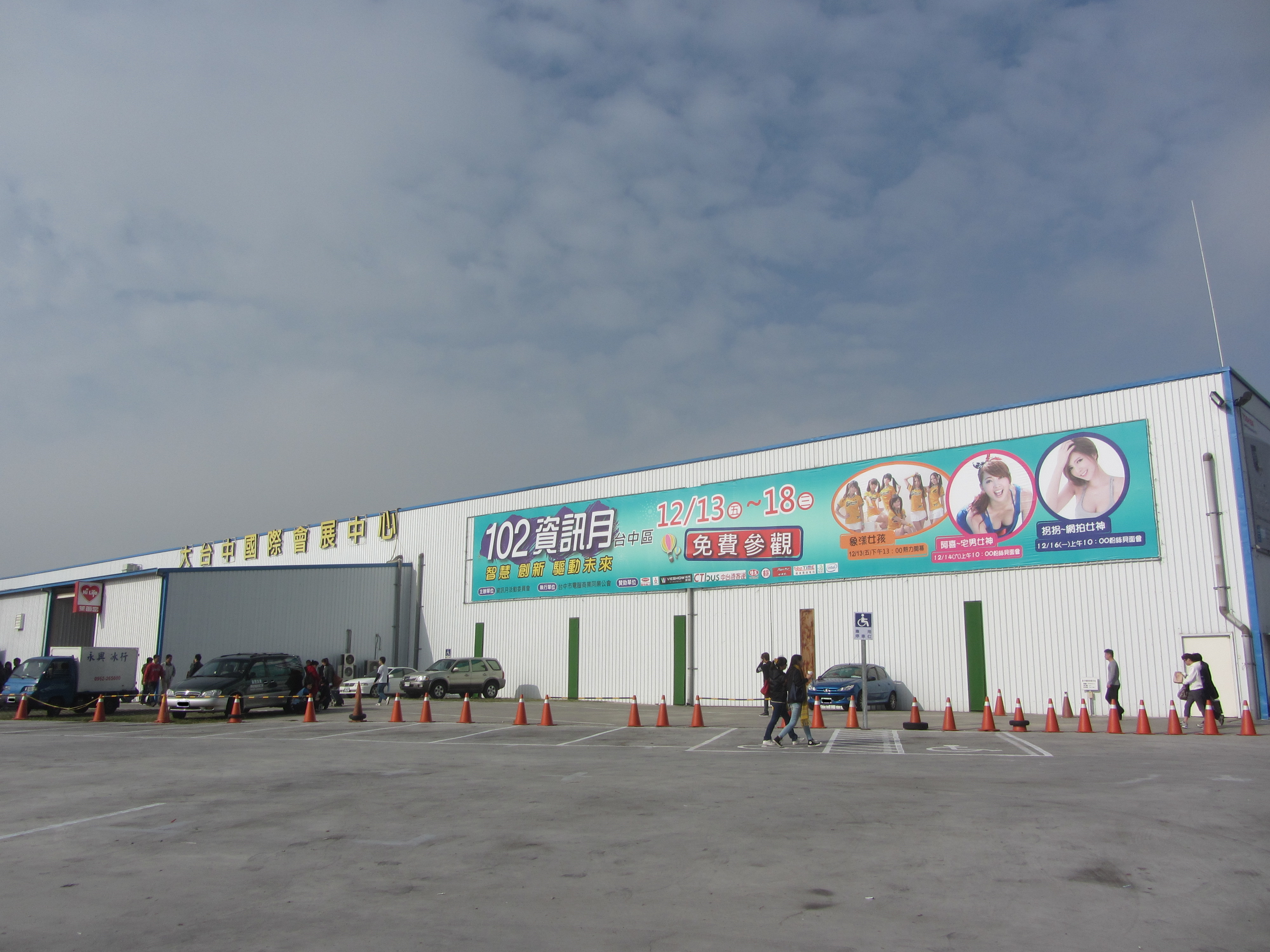
- Interactive map of Greater Taichung International Expo Center 大台中國際會展中心
- Location: Wuri, Taichung, Taiwan
- Coordinates: 24°06′59.0″N 120°36′52.5″E
- Public transit: Taichung Station

Construction
- Opened: 7 October 2011

Website
- Official website

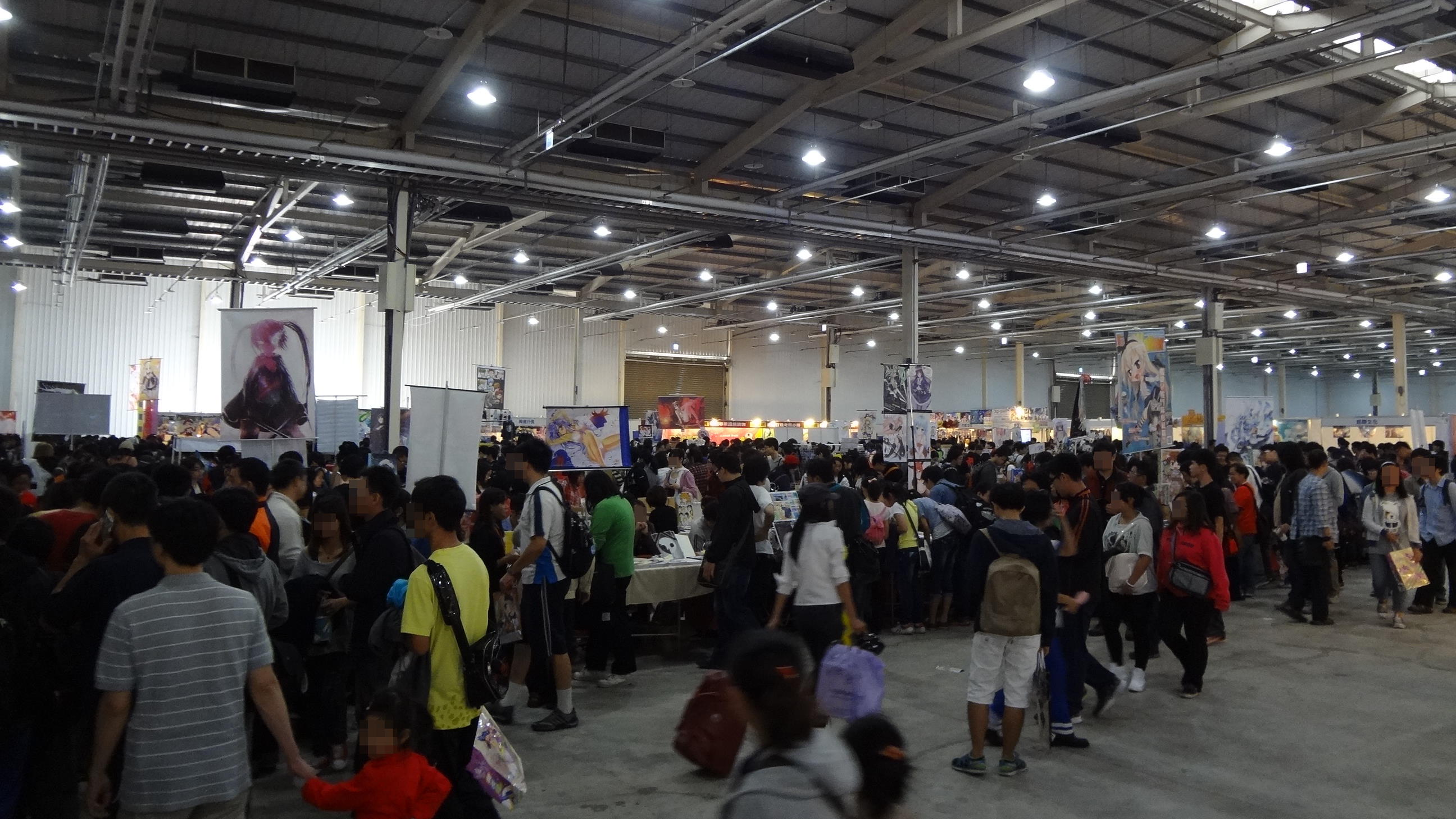
The building interior

The Greater Taichung International Expo Center (GTIEC; traditional Chinese: 大台中國際會展中心; simplified Chinese: 大台中国际会展中心; pinyin: Dà Táizhōng Guójì Huìzhǎn Zhōngxīn) is a convention center in Wuri District, Taichung, Taiwan.

== History ==
The convention center was opened on 7 October 2011.

== Architecture ==
The convention center is divided into 4 exhibition halls, which are hall A, hall B, hall C and hall D.

== Events ==
The convention center hosts various exhibition events, such as hardware etc.

== Transportation ==
The convention center is accessible within walking distance north of Taichung Station of Taiwan HSR.

== See also ==
- World Trade Center Taichung
- List of convention centers in Taiwan
- List of tourist attractions in Taiwan
