= Cross-Strait CEO Summit =

Summit between mainland China and Taiwan

Cross-Strait CEO Summit 两岸企业家峰会
- Host country: Mainland China, Taiwan
- Date: since 2013
- Cities: Nanjing, Taipei

The Cross-Strait CEO Summit (CSCS; simplified Chinese: 两岸企业家峰会; traditional Chinese: 兩岸企業家峰會; pinyin: Liǎng'àn Qǐyèjiā Fēnghuì; Liǎng'àn Qìyèjiā Fēnghuì) is the cross-strait summit between Mainland China and Taiwan on business enterprises collaboration between the two sides. The annual event is being held alternately between Nanjing and Taipei.

== History ==
The summit was initiated after the signing of Economic Cooperation Framework Agreement between both sides on 29 June 2010 in Chongqing.

== Summits ==
=== 2013 ===
The 2013 summit was held in Nanjing. The summit resulted in the creation of seven task forces for cross-strait collaboration in biotechnology, healthcare, culture, creative, energy, petrochemical and home appliances, small and medium enterprises and emerging business sectors.

=== 2014 ===
The 2014 summit was held in Taipei on 15–16 December in Taipei International Convention Center. The summit was attended by 800 business executives, experts, scholars and government officials. There were 31 agreements and memorandum of understandings signed in total, including the establishments of Taiwan product center in Shanghai Free-Trade Zone.

=== 2015 ===
The 2015 summit was held in Nanjing on 3–4 November. The summit was attended by 850 academia, business and industry executives. There were 34 agreements and memorandum of understandings signed in total, including cooperation in biotechnology, culture, finance, integrated circuits, medical, natural gas, petrochemical and telecommunication fields.

=== 2017 ===
The 2017 summit was held in Nanjing on 6–7 November with the theme of New Situation, New Business Opportunities and New Mindset. Mainland China was represented by Chairman of the Chinese People's Political Consultative Conference Yu Zhengsheng. The summit was attended by 700 business leaders from both sides. There were 29 agreements and memorandum of understandings signed in total.

=== 2018 ===
The 2018 summit was held in Xiamen, Fujian on 3–5 December. The summit was attended by 1,100 entrepreneurs, industrial and business group of people. There was a US$1.5 billion deal signed in total.

=== 2019 ===
The 2019 summit was held in Nanjing on 4–5 November with the theme of Strengthening Integration Development, Building Mutual Markets. Taiwan was represented by Vincent Siew and mainland China was represented by Chairman of the Chinese People's Political Consultative Conference Wang Yang.

== See also ==
- Cross-Strait relations
- Cross-Strait Economic, Trade and Culture Forum
