= Grand Hyatt Taipei =

Hotel in Xinyi, Taipei, Taiwan

- 台北君悅酒店
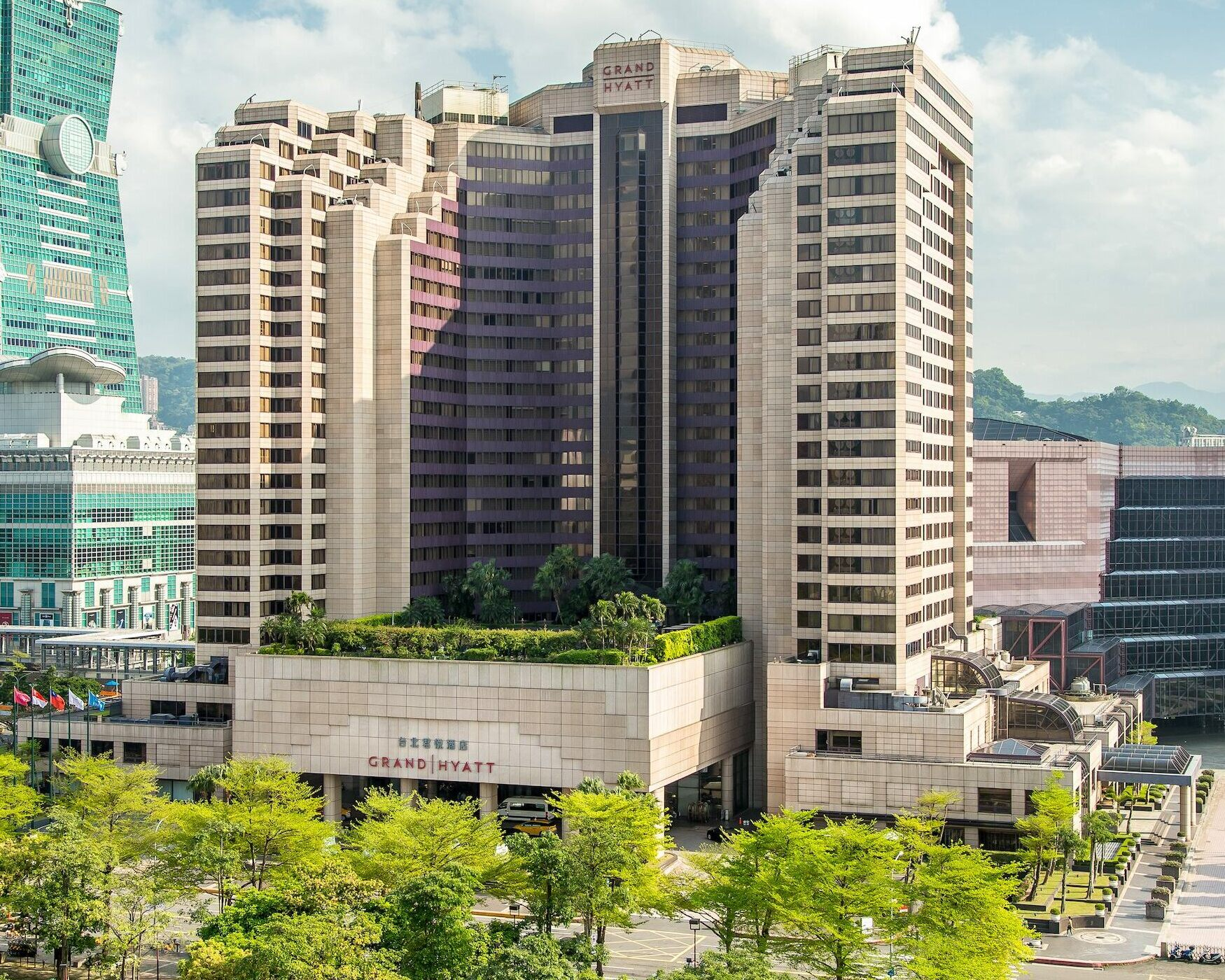
- Interactive map of the Grand Hyatt Taipei area

General information
- Location: No. 2, Songshou Road, Xinyi District, Taipei, Taiwan, 11051, Taiwan
- Coordinates: 25°2′7.7″N 121°33′45.1″E
- Opened: September 1990
- Management: Hyatt Hotels Corporation

Technical details
- Floor count: 27
- Floor area: 118,505.52 square metres (1,275,582.8 sq ft)

Design and construction
- Architect: Haigo T. H. Shen
- Main contractor: Pacific Construction Co., LTD.

Other information
- Number of rooms: 850
- Number of suites: 94
- Number of restaurants: 9
- Number of bars: 2
- Parking: 600

Website
- taipei.grand.hyatt.com

Grand Hyatt Taipei (Chinese: 台北君悅酒店; pinyin: Táiběi Jūnyuè Jiǔdiàn) is a 5-star luxury hotel in Taipei, Taiwan. Located in Xinyi Planning District, the 27-story, 104 m (341 ft) skyscraper hotel is located adjacent to Taipei 101, Taipei World Trade Center complex, Taipei City Council, Taipei International Convention Center, and various shopping malls and entertainment. It opened in 1990 as "the first, true international luxury hotel in the capital." The hotel is owned by Hong Leong Group and operated by Hyatt Hotels Corporation.

== Accommodation ==
Grand Hyatt Taipei has 850 rooms and suites, the largest number of guest rooms in the country. Guestrooms and suites range from 31 sq m to 220 sq m, and offer city, mountain or poolside views.

== Notable guests ==
- Air Supply
- Andrea Bocelli
- Avril Lavigne
- B1A4 - South Korean band
- Backstreet Boys
- Beyoncé
- Bill Clinton - The 42nd President of the United States
- Boyz II Men
- Bradley Beal - NBA player
- Chen Yunlin - former chairman of the Association for Relations Across the Taiwan Straits (ARATS),
- Damian Lillard - NBA player
- Diane Kruger
- Eagles
- Europe
- FTIsland - South Korean band
- George H. W. Bush - The 41st President of the United States
- Guns N' Roses
- Hidetoshi Nakata - former Japanese football player
- Hugh Jackman
- Imagine Dragons
- Jo In-sung - South Korean actor
- Kenny G - American saxophonist
- Lee Dong-wook - South Korean actor
- Lee Min-ho - South Korean actor
- Linkin Park
- Margaret Thatcher - former Prime Minister of United Kingdom
- Mr. Big
- Mswati III - the King of Eswatini
- Namie Amuro - Japanese singer and actress
- Nancy Pelosi - Speaker of the United States House of Representatives
- Nicolas Cage
- Nigel Kennedy - British violinist
- Robinson Canó - MLB player
- Snoop Dogg
- Song Hye-kyo - South Korean actress
- SS501 - South Korean boy band
- Thirty Seconds to Mars
- Wonder Girls - South Korean girl group
- X Japan - Japanese heavy metal band
