= List of convention centers in Taiwan =

This is a list of convention centers in Taiwan.

== List ==
Name	Image	City	Year opened	Exhibition hall space	Ref.
Taipei World Trade Center		Taipei	1986	23,269 m^{2} (250,470 sq ft)	
Taipei International Convention Center		Taipei	1989	3,122 m^{2} (33,600 sq ft)	
Taipei Nangang Exhibition Center		Taipei	2008	75,600 m^{2} (814,000 sq ft)	
New Taipei City Exhibition Hall		New Taipei City	2001	4,287.5 m^{2} (46,150 sq ft)	
Taoyuan Convention and Exhibition Center		Taoyuan	2024	10,168 m^{2} (109,450 sq ft)	
World Trade Center Taichung		Taichung	1988	4,851 m^{2} (52,220 sq ft)	
Greater Taichung International Expo Center		Taichung	2011	11,570 m^{2} (124,500 sq ft)	
Taichung International Exhibition Center		Taichung	2017	16,308 m^{2} (175,540 sq ft)	
Taichung International Convention and Exhibition Center		Taichung	2025	11,000 m^{2} (120,000 sq ft)	
ICC Tainan		Tainan	2022	10,692 m^{2} (115,090 sq ft)	
International Convention Center Kaohsiung		Kaohsiung	2000	2,800 m^{2} (30,000 sq ft)	
Kaohsiung Exhibition Center		Kaohsiung	2014	25,000 m^{2} (270,000 sq ft)	

== See also ==
- List of convention and exhibition centers
- List of tourist attractions in Taiwan
