= Taipei World Trade Center =

Convention center in Taipei

Coordinates: 25°2′2″N 121°33′44″E

Taipei World Trade Center 臺北世界貿易中心
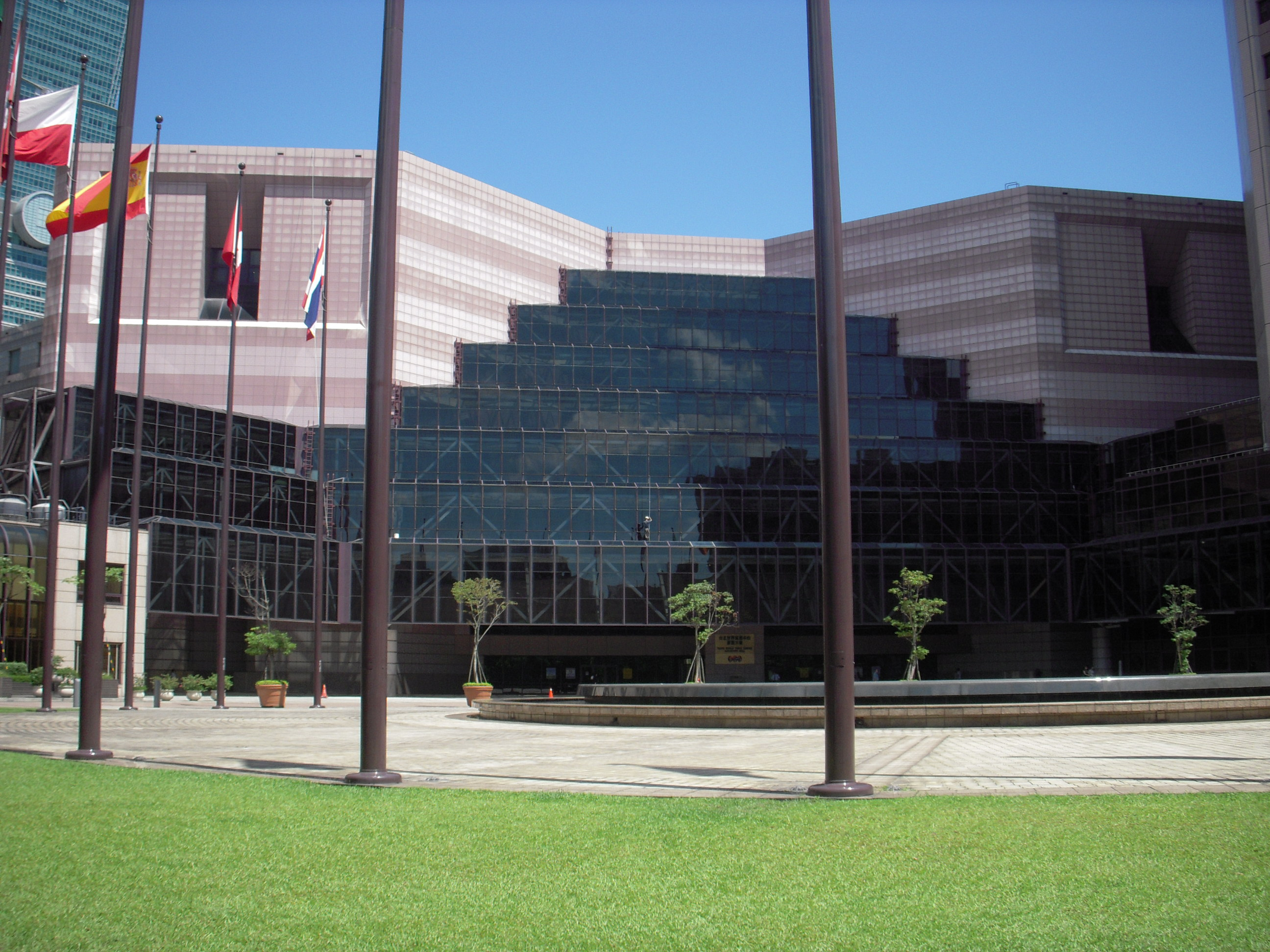
- Taipei World Trade Center facing Jilong Road
- Interactive map of the Taipei World Trade Center 臺北世界貿易中心 area

General information
- Location: Xinyi, Taipei, Taiwan
- Construction started: 16 October 1982
- Inaugurated: 31 December 1985
- Client: Taiwan External Trade Development Council

Design and construction
- Architects: Haigo T. H. Shen, Tange Associates

The Taipei World Trade Center (TWTC; Chinese: 臺北世界貿易中心; pinyin: Táiběi Shìjiè Màoyì Zhōngxīn) was inaugurated in January 1986 by Taiwan's foremost trade promotion organization, the Taiwan External Trade Development Council (TAITRA), to provide a single, modern venue that would combine exhibition space, conference facilities, offices, and hotel accommodation for international business. TWTC combines every possible service that brings together a vast consulting service on trade-related issues, trading partners, suppliers, and markets.

This four-in-one complex, located in the city's Xinyi District, is designed to accommodate the needs of the international business community, which is why there is not just one, but four structures at the TWTC. The Exhibition Hall, International Convention Center, TWTC International Trade Building and Grand Hyatt Taipei, all comprise one integrated business complex.

== Establishment ==
The current Taipei World Trade Center only saw completion in 1985 following many drawbacks in construction and development. However, the history of the Taiwan External Trade Development Council (TAITRA) began on 1 July 1970, where in an effort by the Republic of China Government to further develop international trade activities following accelerated economic growth in the 1970s.

Initially, TAITRA did not have a specialized exhibition hall to accommodate the exhibitions of export goods. As a result of the lack of facilities, in March 1974, the Taipei Grand Hotel was chosen for the first ever Taipei Trade Shows - "Taiwan Export Clothings Exhibition". Subsequently, the necessity of a new exhibition hall allowed for the establishment of the TAITRA exhibition hall set up at Taipei Songshan Airport. Yet shortly afterwards due to Taiwan's rapid economic growth as one of the Four Asian Tigers, TAITRA again found itself having to facilitate even larger scale exhibitions.

Architects and engineers selections were conducted through international design competitions. Hellmuth, Obata and Kassabaum (HOK), and William Tao & Associates, both from St. Louis, Missouri, and T.Y. Lin & Associates from San Francisco, USA, were selected to perform master plans, conceptual and schematic designs in 1982. Detailed designs were completed by Haigo Shen & Associates in Taipei, Taiwan. General Consultants and Construction Managers included Bechtel from USA, Sinotech Engineering and CTCI, both from Taipei, Taiwan.

On 31 December 1985, the Taipei World Trade Center had its inaugural exhibition for IT Month, which coincided with the opening of the Exhibition Hall. Following suit, the International Tourist Hotel (completed in 1987, renamed the Grand Hyatt Taipei), the International Trade Building (completed in 1988) and International Convention Center (completed in 1989, now as TICC) were opened for use. From January 1, 1986, the Exhibition Hall and TICC has been managed by TAITRA under the commission of the Ministry of Economic Affairs to this day. Hence from 8 January 1990, the Taipei World Trade Center exists in its present form as an all-purpose four-in-one complex.

== Main buildings ==
=== Exhibition Building (Hall 1) ===
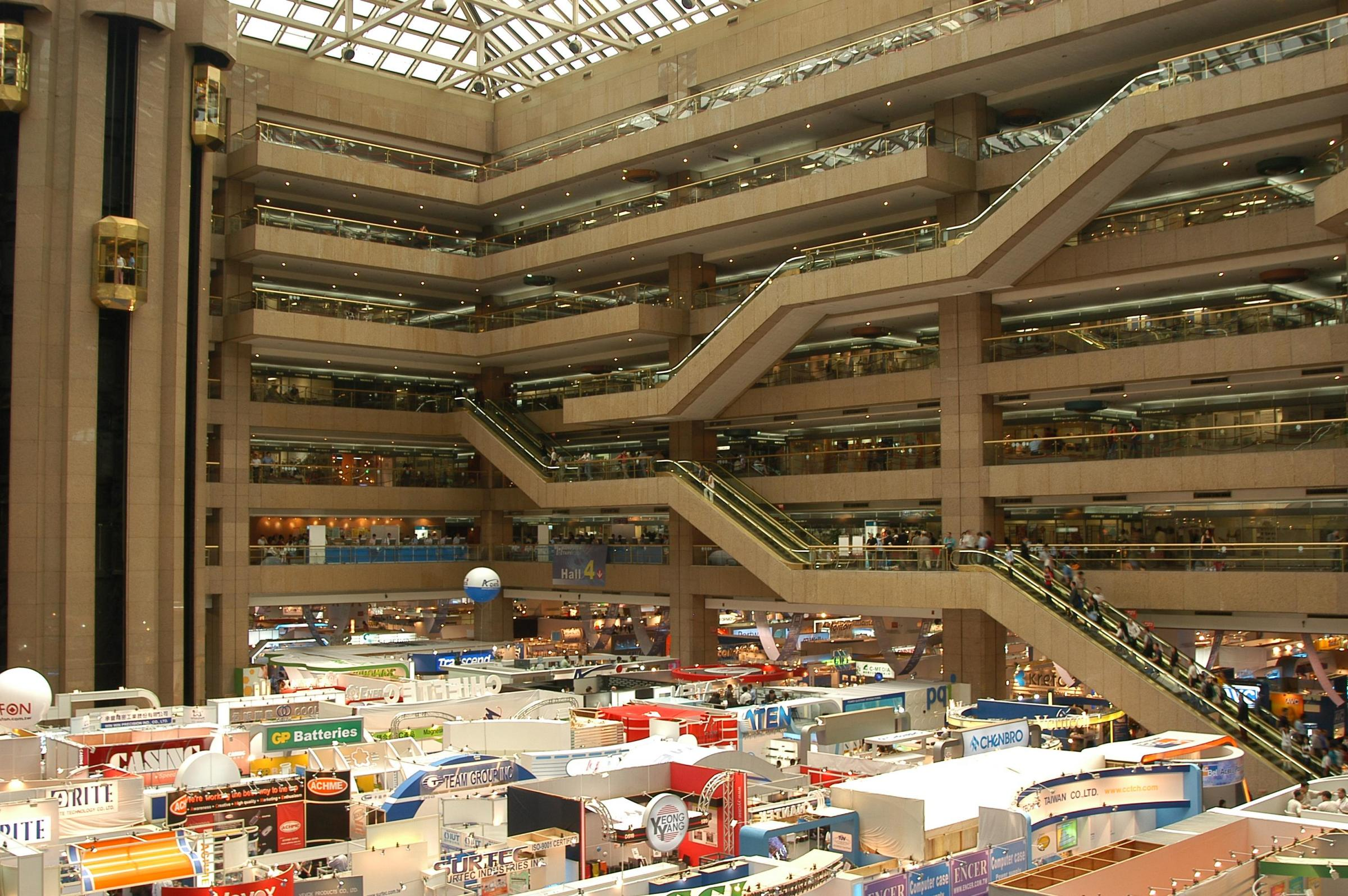
The exhibition hall in Taipei World Trade Center

==== Exhibition Hall ====
- First floor: Usually referred to as "Exhibition Hall 1". Showroom floor area is 23450 square metres, accommodates 1304 display booths, and is divided into four quadrants (A, B, C, D). Popularly, Taipei Trade Shows and other larger exhibitions are held here.
- 2nd floor: Also known as "Area H", has an aerial bridge that connects to Taipei 101, floor area of 4789 square meters, accommodates 250 standard sized exhibition booths. Exhibitions in this area typically range from small to mid-sized local expositions or education related expositions.

==== Convention Room ====
Located on the 2nd floor, divided into three rooms, mainly functions as meeting or board room for exhibition organizers, additionally, the 3rd and 4th rooms can be connected accordingly to accommodate varying delegations.

==== TAITRA Book Store ====
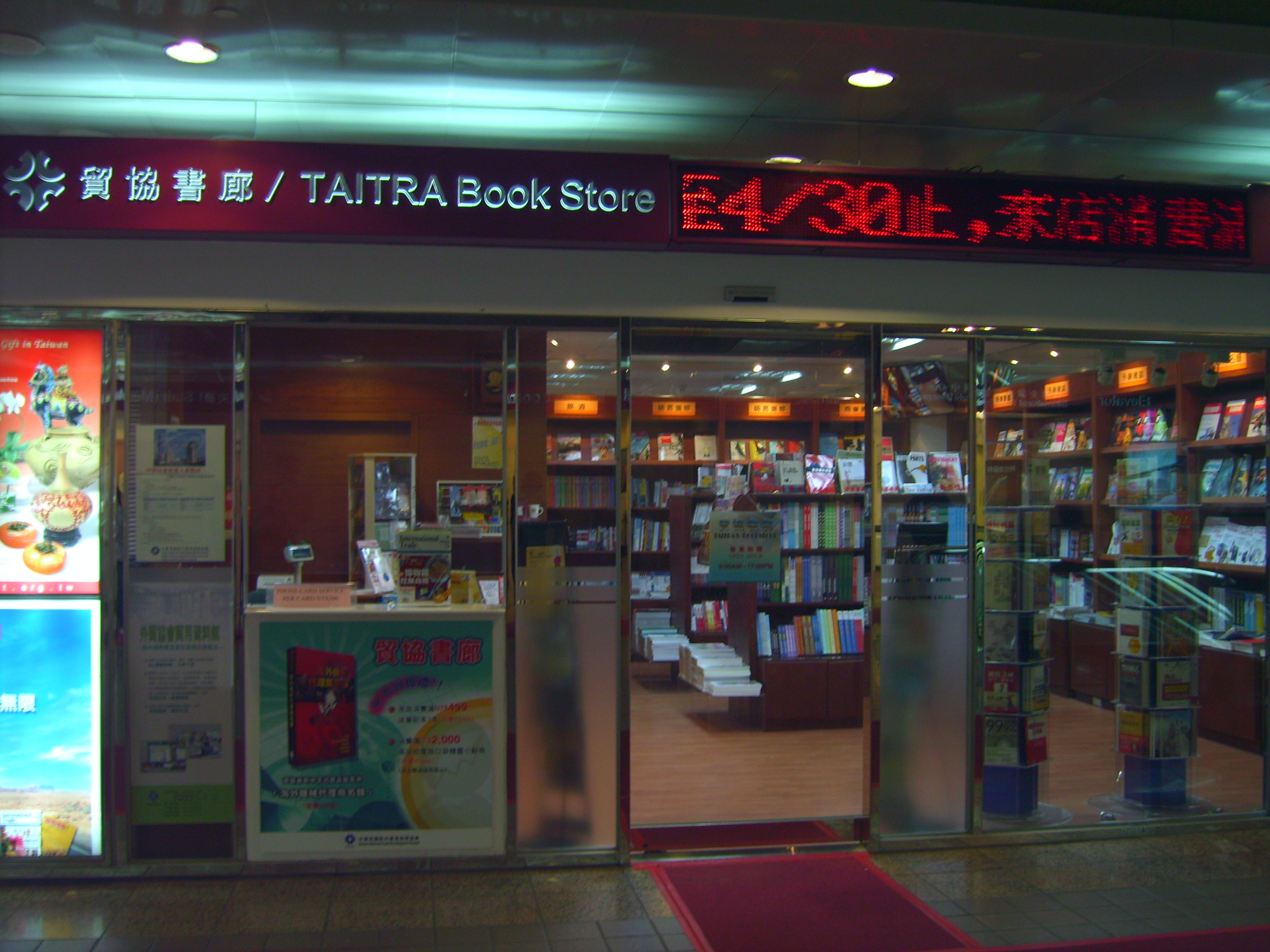
TAITRA Book Store

Open for business during weekdays, or on holidays when there is an exhibition. Book collection mainly comprises sales trading-related items. When Taipei Trade Shows are going on at the time, it also provides exhibitor directory lists.

==== Trade Market (sales display) ====
Catering to different needs, the 2nd to 6th floors are set as an "Export Market", with the 7th floor as the "Import Market". First opened in June 1985 for product export companies to register for sales. There are currently 1052 displays.

=== Exhibition Hall 3 ===
Start to use from 18 September 2003, showground area is 7481 square meter, able to accommodate 365 display booths, and floors above 2nd floor are planned into parking area. During large exhibition periods, the parking rate will adjust accordingly.

== Important exhibitions ==
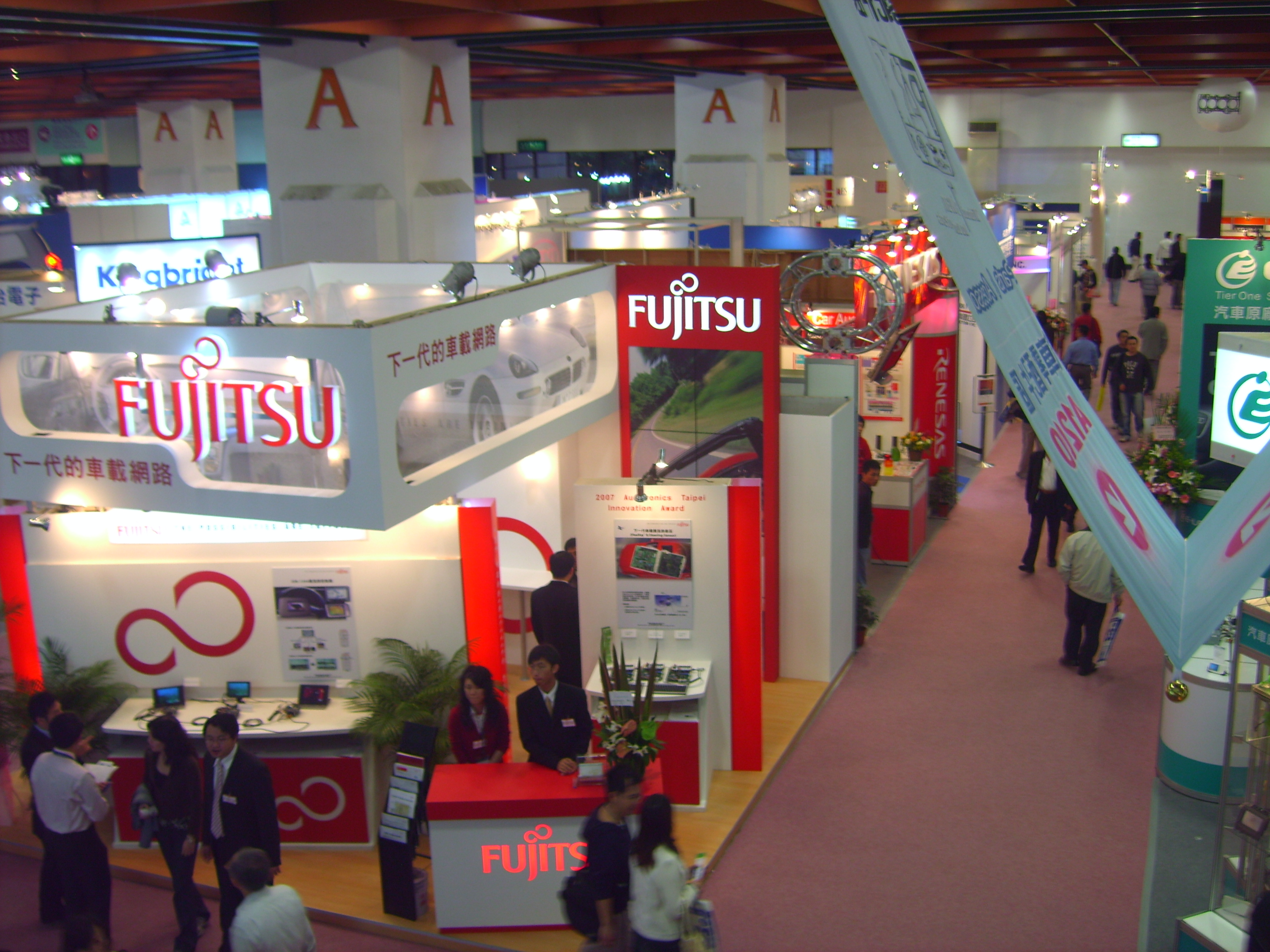
Taipei Trade Shows - AutoTronics Taipei

- Taipei International Book Exhibition
- COMPUTEX
- Taipei Computer Application Show
- IT Month
- Taipei International Travel Fair
- TAITRA Taiwan Trade Shows

== Access ==
The building is accessible from Taipei 101–World Trade Center Station of the Taipei Metro.

== See also ==
- Taipei Nangang Exhibition Center
- Taipei International Convention Center
- Grand Hyatt Taipei
- World Trade Center Taichung
- List of convention centers in Taiwan
- List of tourist attractions in Taiwan
