= 15th National Congress of the Kuomintang =

1997 conference in Taipei

The 15th National Congress of the Kuomintang (Chinese: 中國國民黨第十五次全國代表大会) was the fifteenth national congress of the Kuomintang, held in 24–28 August 1997 at Taipei International Convention Center, Taipei, Taiwan.

== Details ==
The congress was attended by 2,300 of the party members elected in the July 1997 election.

== Results ==
The new cabinet was appointed with Vincent Siew as the Premier and started to take office on 1 September 1997.

== See also ==
- Kuomintang
