= Taipei International Book Exhibition =

Book fair in Taiwan

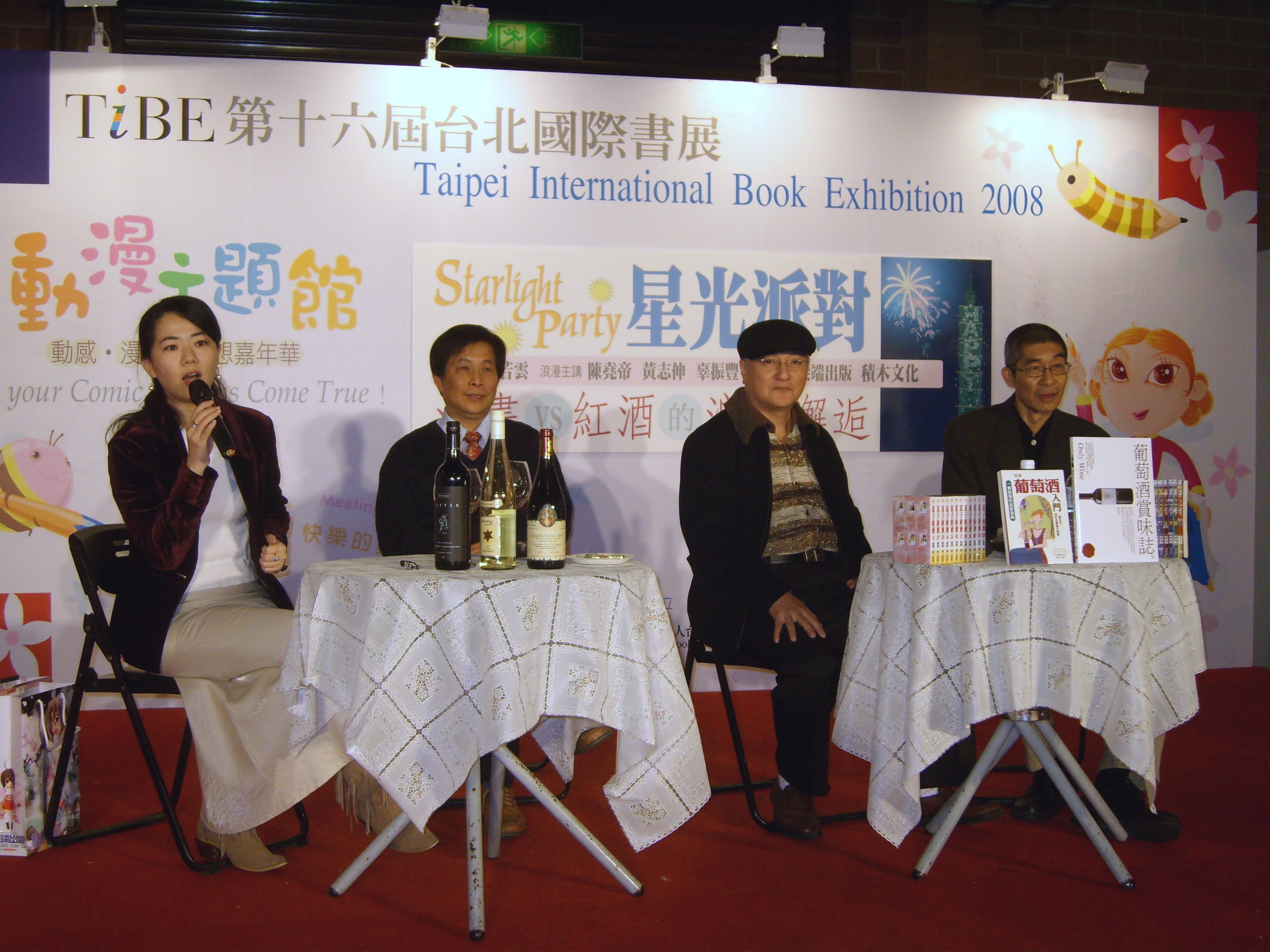
Comic Theme Hall at Taipei Show Hall 2

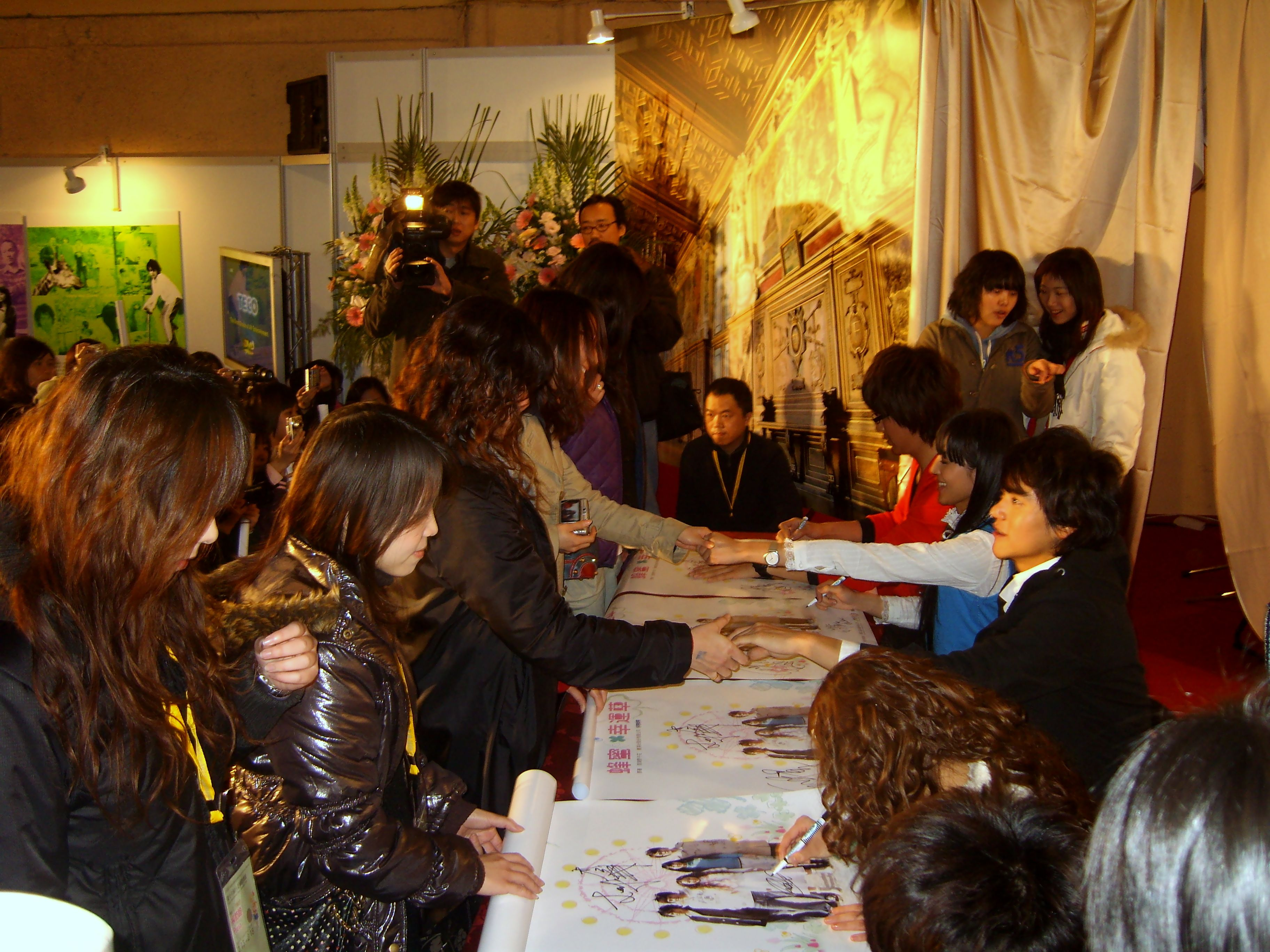
Signing Event of Japanese Drama Honey and Clover at the 2008 exhibition

The Taipei International Book Exhibition (TIBE; Chinese: 台北國際書展; pinyin: Táiběi Guójì Shūzhǎn) is a Taiwanese book fair organized by the Taipei Book Fair Foundation and supervised by the Ministry of Culture (former Government Information Office). It was established on 15 December 1987 at the National Central Library and focused on distribution and copyright negotiations between international publishers. The second show was held two years later at the Taipei World Trade Center, which has remained its venue since. In 1998, the fair switched from a bi-annual to an annual schedule, and is now held every February. Attendance to the event has continued to increase, making the Taipei International Book Exhibition the largest book fair in Asia. In 2017, the Ministry of Culture extended the exhibition period, highlighting the publishers’ expertise, lowering venue rental prices, and fostering interaction between writers and readers. The book fair is currently the fourth largest in the world, behind the Frankfurt Book Fair, BookExpo America (BEA), and the Bologna Children's Book Fair.

== Exhibition ==
=== Existing sections ===
==== Country Pavilion ====
Prior to the 5th edition of the exhibition, the Country Pavilion (國家主題館) was called the International Pavilion (國際主題館) as it showcased publications outside of Taiwan. Following editions saw the pavilion being renamed the 'Country Pavilion'. Each edition would focus on a certain country, in what has been described as a bid to highlights the book publications of featured countries. Since then, the pavilion has featured a different country in every edition.

== See also ==
- Frankfurt Book Fair in the Frankfurt Trade Fair
- Trade fair
