= 14th National Congress of the Kuomintang =

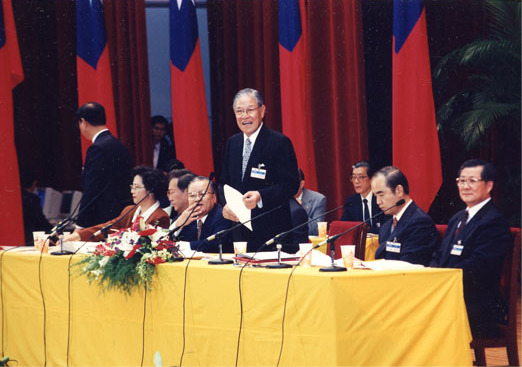
The 14th National Congress of the Kuomintang of China voted for the chairman of the party for the first time.

The 14th National Congress of the Kuomintang (Chinese: 中國國民黨第十四次全國代表大会) was the fourteenth national congress of the Kuomintang, held on 16–22 August 1993 at Taipei International Convention Center in Xinyi District, Taipei, Taiwan.

== Results ==
Lee Teng-hui was reelected as Chairman of the Kuomintang. Lee Yuan-tzu, Hau Pei-tsun, Lin Yang-kang and Lien Chan were elected as Vice Chairmen.

== See also ==
- Kuomintang
