= Taipei Nangang Exhibition Center =

Convention center in Taipei, Taiwan

Taipei Nangang Exhibition Center 臺北南港展覽館
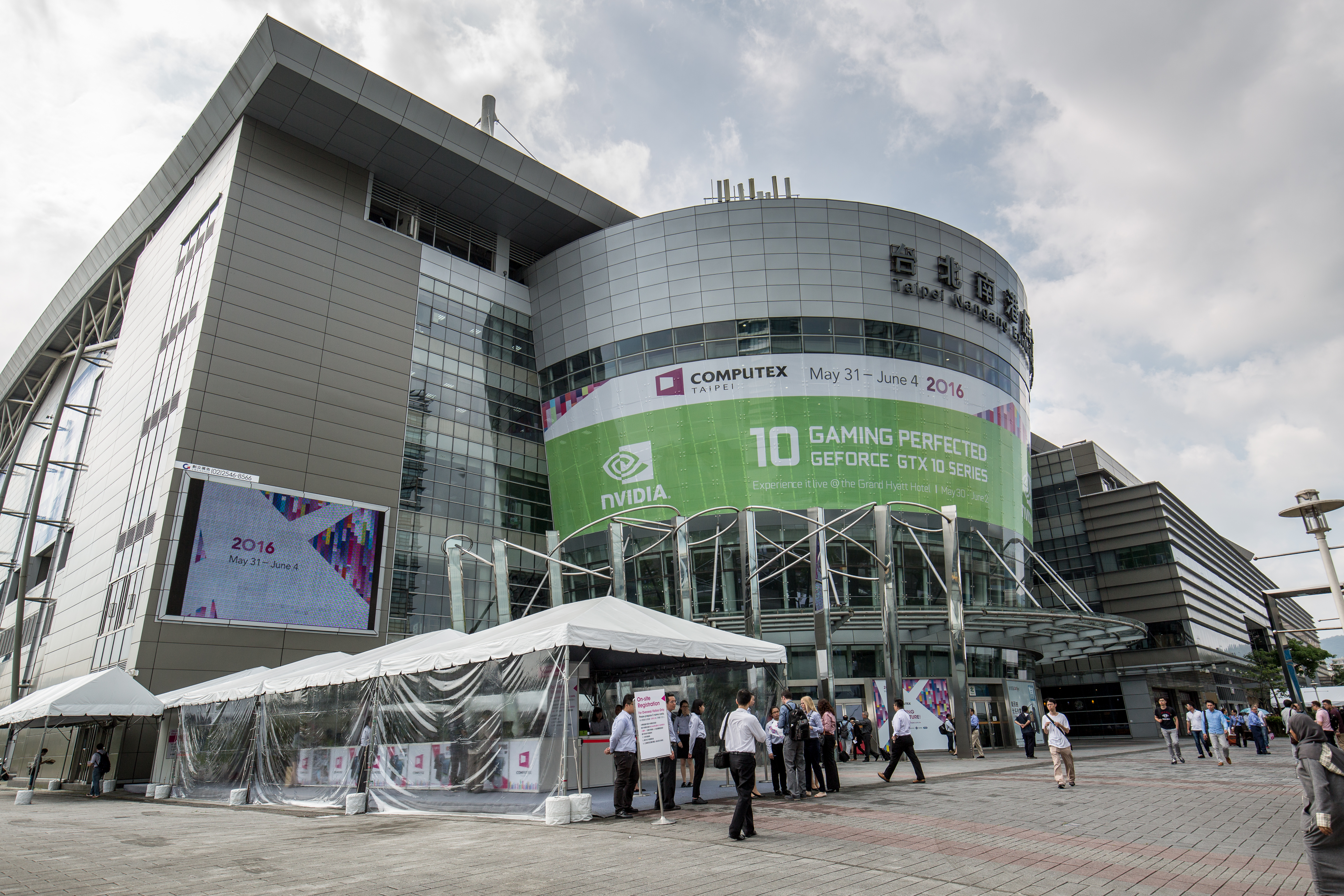
- Interactive map of Taipei Nangang Exhibition Center 臺北南港展覽館
- Location: Nangang, Taipei, Taiwan
- Coordinates: 25.06°N 121.62°E
- Operator: Taiwan External Trade Development Council
- Public transit: Taipei Nangang Exhibition Center MRT station

Construction
- Opened: 2008

Taipei Nangang Exhibition Center (Chinese: 臺北南港展覽館; pinyin: Táiběi Nángǎng Zhǎnlǎnguǎn), also known as TWTC Nangang Exhibition Hall or TaiNEX, is a superimposed purpose-built exhibition complex in Nangang District, Taipei, Taiwan. It consists of two exhibition halls and is located to the northeast of the Taipei World Trade Center (TWTC), about a 15-minute drive from the TWTC along the Huandong Expressway.

== Hall 1 (TaiNEX 1) ==
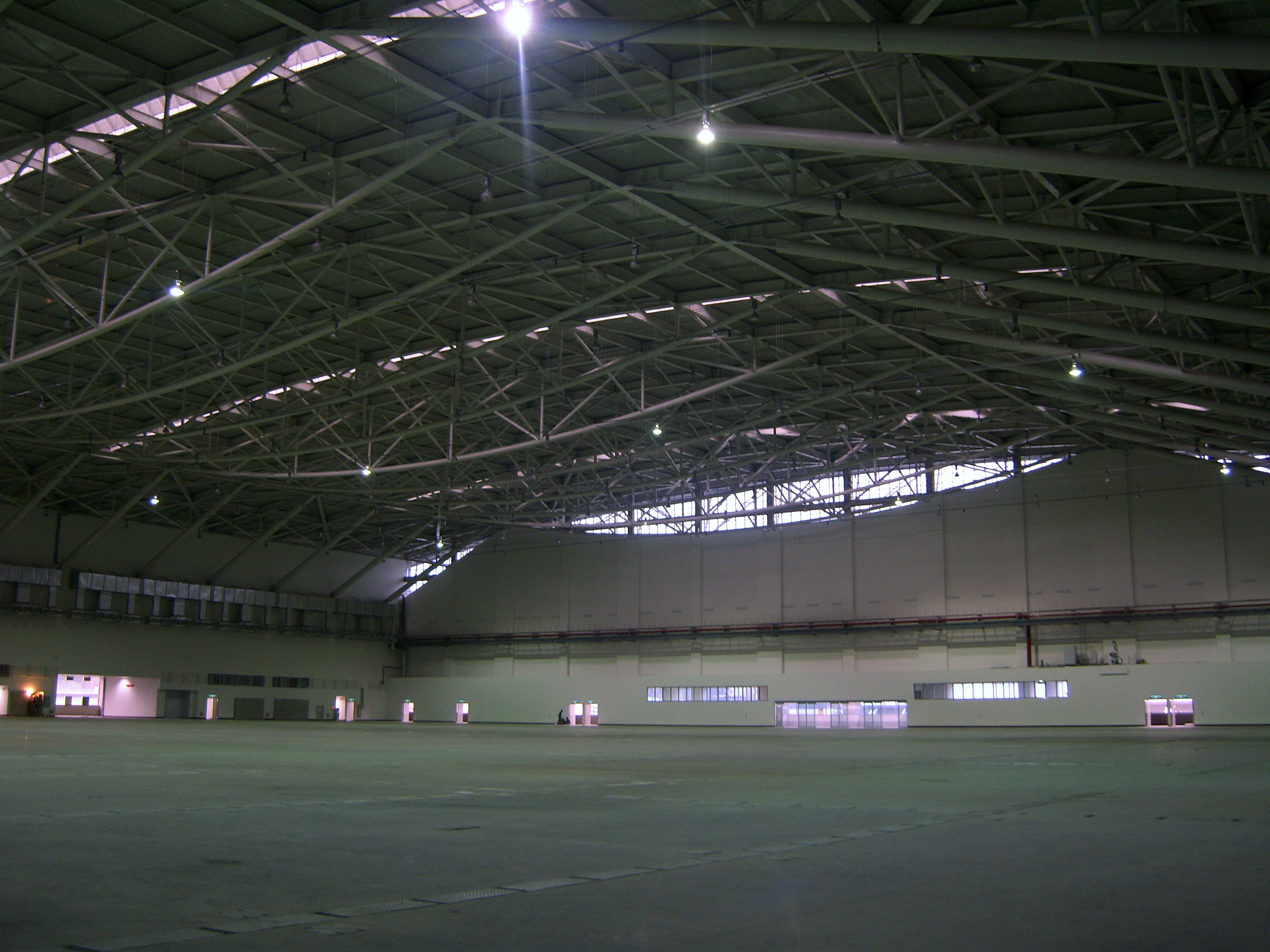
View of upper hall

The complex has the capacity to host 2,626 standard-size (3 m × 3 m) booths and occupies an exhibition space of 47,000 m^{2}. Construction began in March 2005, costing US $110 million, and was completed in 2008.

=== Lower exhibition floor ===
The exhibition hall on the ground floor has a total of 23,905 m^{2} with a capacity for 1,314 standard-size exhibition booths, with each booth measuring 3 m × 3 m. Its lowest ceiling is 9 meters high and floor loading weight capacity is 5,000 kg/m^{2}. Electricity and water supply lines are paved beneath the floor surface. The floor can be divided into three areas to accommodate three events taking place at the same time.

=== Upper exhibition floor ===
The 23,104-square-metre area has a capacity for 1,312 standard-size vendor booths, a column-free hall on the fourth floor with an average clearance height of 18 m. It is a sufficient venue for large-scale trade shows, conventions, sports or other events. It has a floor loading capacity for 2,000 kg/m^{2} with concealed electricity and water outlets.

Two large entrance halls, 1,200 m^{2} and 850 m^{2} respectively, are located both on the ground and the fourth floors and can be used for registration, meeting areas, information distribution, and other pre-function activities.

== Hall 2 (TaiNEX 2) ==
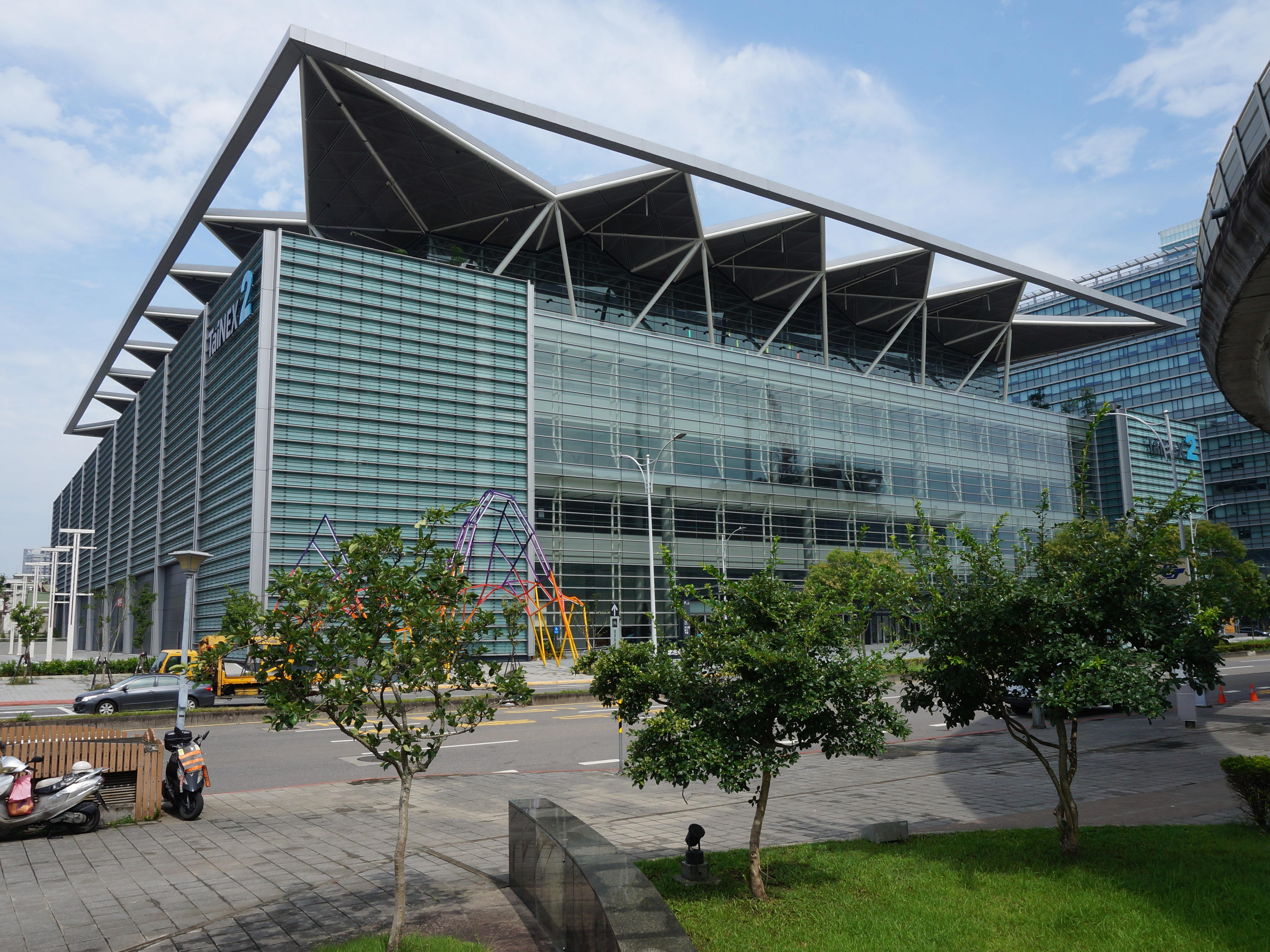
TaiNEX 2, the second exhibition hall

A second exhibition hall was completed in 2019. The nine-story building is situated on a 3.36-hectare lot adjacent to the first exhibition hall.

== Access ==
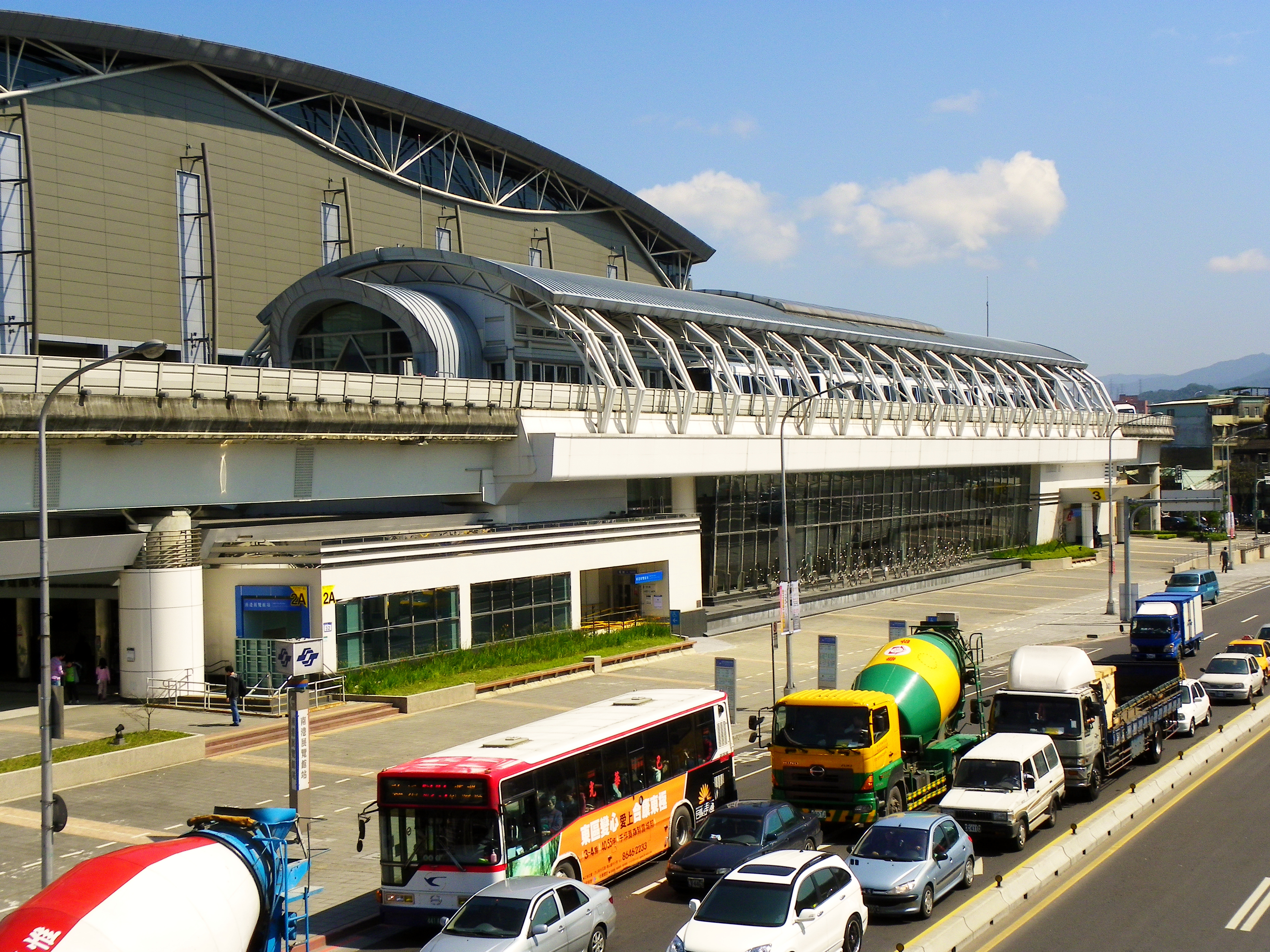
Taipei Metro Taipei Nangang Exhibition Center Station

The Exhibition Center is served by the Taipei Metro via the Taipei Nangang Exhibition Center Station.

== Notable events ==
- 3 April 2009: Dig Out Your Soul Tour – the concert by Oasis.
- 8 May 2010: Rapture of the Deep tour – the concert by Deep Purple.
- 29 July 2010: Pandemonium Tour – the concert by Pet Shop Boys.
- 18 February 2011: Number Ones, Up Close and Personal – the sixth concert by Janet Jackson, in support of her second compilation album, Number Ones.
- 13 May 2011: The Black Star Tour – the fourth concert by Avril Lavigne.
- 3 July 2011: Aphrodite: Les Folies Tour – the eleventh concert tour by Kylie Minogue, in support of her studio album, Aphrodite.
- 6 November 2011 x-Japan World Tour
- 17 March 2012: 20th L'Anniversary World Tour 2012 – the concert tour by L'Arc-en-Ciel, in celebrating their 20 years anniversary.
- 17 and 18 May 2012: The Born This Way Ball Tour – the third concert tour by Lady Gaga, in support of her second studio album, Born This Way.
- 10 August 2013: Biophilia tour – the seventh concert tour by Björk, supporting the eponymous studio album Biophilia.
- 26 October 2014: The Elusive Chanteuse Show – the eighth concert tour by Mariah Carey, supporting the studio album Me. I Am Mariah... The Elusive Chanteuse.
- 21 August 2015: Smoke + Mirrors Tour – the second concert by Imagine Dragons.
- 14 and 15 September 2015: Maroon V Tour – the concert by Maroon 5.
- 28 September 2015: Bon Jovi’s concert was canceled due to Typhoon Dujuan, as the Taipei City government announced school and office closures for that day.
- 7 May 2016: Summer Nights – the concert by Olivia Newton-John.
- 19 September 2016: Queen + Adam Lambert 2016 Summer Festival Tour – the concert by Queen + Adam Lambert.
- 3 October 2016: Return to Forever / 50th Anniversary Tour – the successive tour of Get Your Sting and Blackout World Tour by Scorpions
- 29 November 2016: Live in Taipei – the concert by Sigur Rós.
- 13 June 2017: Britney Spears: Piece of Me Tour – the ninth concert tour by Britney Spears.
- 7 and 8 October 2017: Act III: M.O.T.T.E World Tour – the second world tour by G-Dragon.
- 17 April 2018: 24K Magic World Tour – the third concert tour by Bruno Mars.
- 24 and 25 December 2018: 2018 IU 10th Anniversary Tour Concert (dlwlrma) – the eighth concert tour by IU.
- 20 June 2025: 'Awaken the Bloodline' Asia Tour – the concert by &Team

== See also ==
- Taiwan Trade Shows
- Taipei World Trade Center
- Taipei International Convention Center
- Taiwan External Trade Development Council
- List of convention centers in Taiwan
- List of tourist attractions in Taiwan
