= Taipei International Convention Center =

Convention center in Xinyi, Taipei, Taiwan

Taipei International Convention Center 臺北國際會議中心
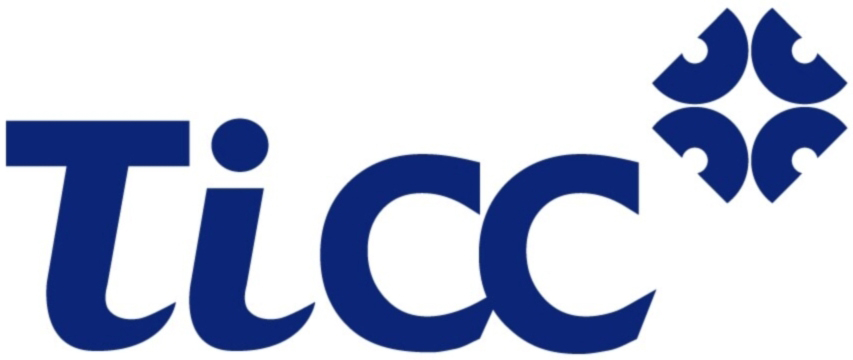

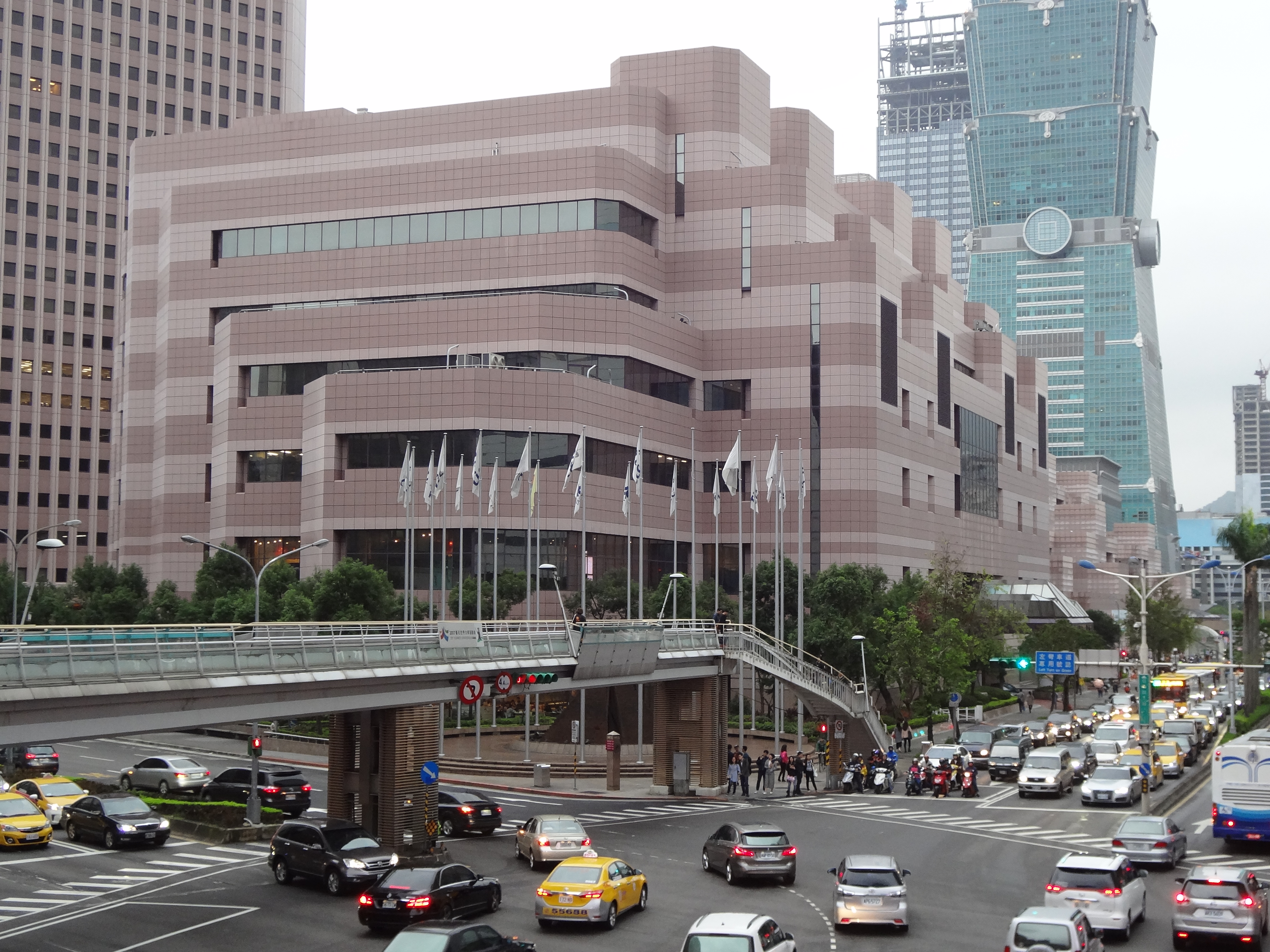
- Interactive map of Taipei International Convention Center 臺北國際會議中心
- Location: Xinyi, Taipei, Taiwan
- Coordinates: 25°02′00″N 121°33′38″E
- Operator: Taiwan External Trade Development Council
- Public transit: Taipei 101–World Trade Center Station

Construction
- Opened: 1989

Website
- Official website

The Taipei International Convention Center (TICC; traditional Chinese: 臺北國際會議中心; simplified Chinese: 台北国际会议中心; pinyin: Táiběi Guójì Huìyì Zhōngxīn) is a convention center in Xinyi District, Taipei, Taiwan. The convention center is an integral part of the Taipei World Trade Center. Except for renting for conferences and exhibitions, the venue is also used for holding concerts and launch parties.

== History ==
The convention center was opened in 1989.

== Architecture ==
TICC consists of 6 floors with a total area of 14,727 m^{2}. The buildings stands at a height of 49 meters. It consists of a multipurpose plenary hall, meeting rooms of various sizes and a banquet hall.

== Rooms ==
The following rooms in TICC are available to use for conventions and exhibitions:

| Floor | Room | Area (m^{2}) | Capacity (people) |
|---|---|---|---|
| 1/F | 101 | 640 | 744 |
| 1/F | 102 | 232 | 200 |
| 1/F | 103 | 138 | 110 |
| 1/F | 105 | 115 | 100 |
| 1/F | 106 | 40 | 10 |
| 1/F | North VIP Room | 40 | 6 |
| 1/F | South VIP Room | 43 | 14 |
| 2/F | 201 | 729 | 800 |
| 2/F | 202 | 113 | 80 |
| 2/F | 203 | 113 | 80 |
| 3/F | Banquet Hall | 977 | 640 |
| 3/F | North Lounge | 152 | 90 |
| 3/F | South Lounge | 152 | 90 |
| 3/F | Plenary Hall | 2973 | 3122 |
| 4/F | 401 | 193 | 60 |
| 4/F | Joy Lounge | 152 | 90 |
| 4/F | Elegance Lounge | 152 | 90 |
| 4/F | VIP Room | 368 | 250 |
| Total | | 7,322 | 6,576 |

== Events ==
- 14th National Congress of the Kuomintang
- 15th National Congress of the Kuomintang
- 2nd Cross-Strait CEO Summit

== Transportation ==
The convention center is accessible from Taipei 101–World Trade Center Station of the Taipei Metro.

== See also ==
- Taipei World Trade Center
- Taipei Nangang Exhibition Center
- ICC Tainan
- International Convention Center Kaohsiung
- List of convention centers in Taiwan
- List of tourist attractions in Taiwan
