= Taiwan External Trade Development Council =

Taiwanese trade promotion organization

- 中華民國對外貿易發展協會
- Formation: 1 July 1970
- Type: Nonprofit
- Headquarters: Taipei City
- Official language: Chinese, English
- Key people: James C. F. Huang (chairman); Walter Yeh (president & CEO); Simon Wang (Executive Vice President)
- Website: www.taitra.org.tw

The Taiwan External Trade Development Council (TAITRA; Chinese: 中華民國對外貿易發展協會; pinyin: Zhōnghuá Mínguó Duìwài Màoyì Fāzhǎn Xiéhuì) is a non-profit government co-sponsored trade promotion organization in Taiwan. It was founded in 1970 as China External Trade Development Council (CETRA), but changed its English name in January 2004 to avoid confusion with bodies representing the People's Republic of China.

TAITRA assists Taiwan businesses and manufacturers to reinforce their international competitiveness and to cope with the challenges they face in foreign markets. Cooperating with Far East Trade Services, Inc. (FETS) and the Taipei World Trade Center (TWTC), its sister organizations, TAITRA has striven to adapt its trade promotion strategies to the changing international conditions. Its major functions include: Market Research & Information Service, Market Development, Exhibition & Convention Service, Trade Education and Web Service.

== Organizational structure ==
- Board of Directors
- Chairman
  - Auditing Office
- Deputy Chairman
- President and CEO
  - Research and Evaluation Committee
  - Executive Vice Presidents
    - Market Development Department
    - Market Research Department
    - Trade Net Center
    - International Trade Institute
    - Planning and Finance Department
    - 4 Domestic Branch Offices
    - 60 Overseas Branch Offices and 8 Points of Contact in Mainland China
    - Strategic Marketing Department
    - Service Industry Promotion Center
    - Exhibition Department
    - Taipei International Exhibition Center
    - Nangang International Exhibition Center
    - Taipei International Convention Center
    - General Administration Department

== Offices ==
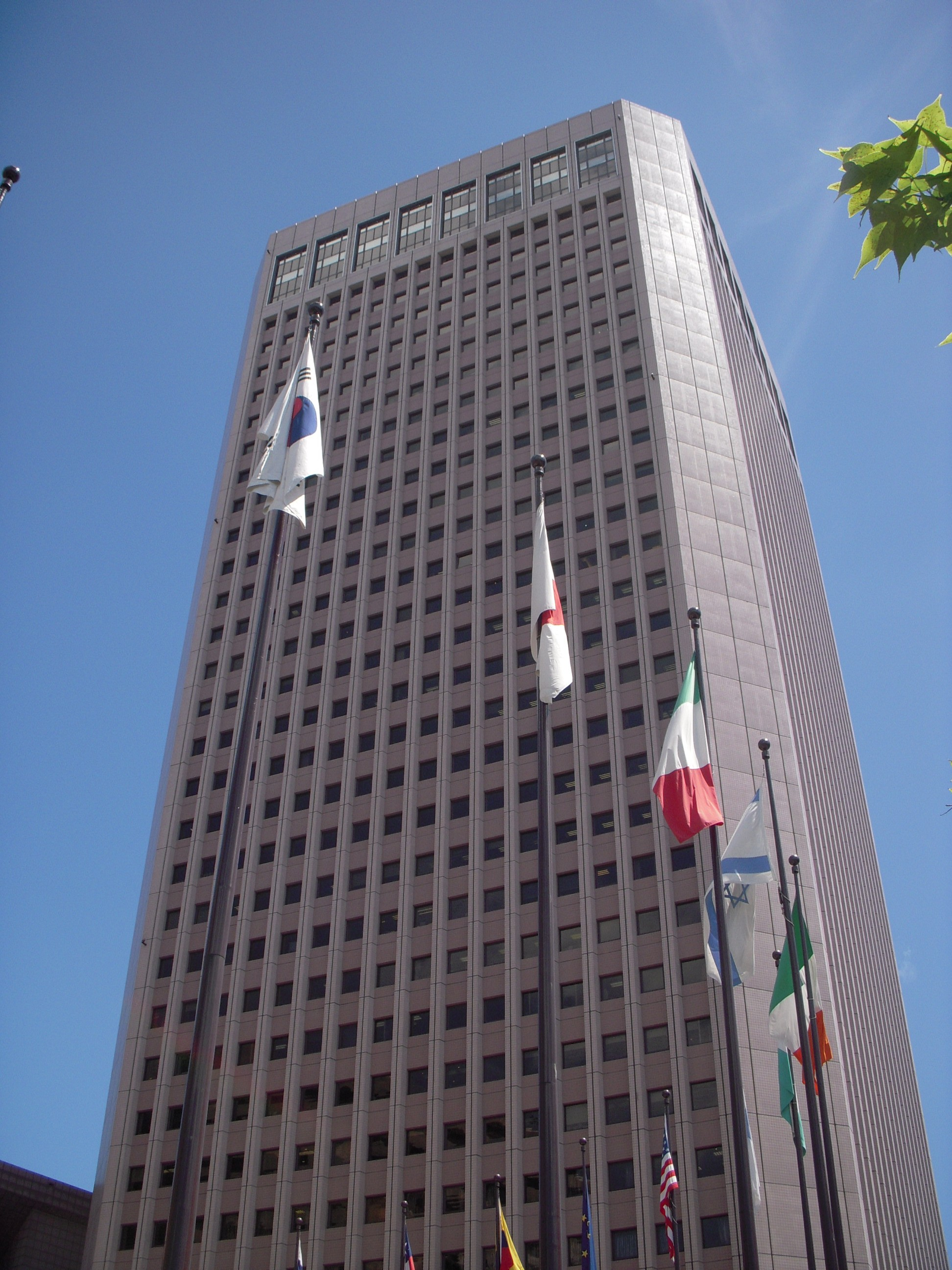
TAITRA headquarter office at International Trade Building

Over the past decades, TAITRA has developed trade promotion, and it has an information network consisting of trained specialists stationed in offices worldwide:

Country or region	Cities
Taiwan	Taipei (headquarters), Hsinchu, Kaohsiung, Taichung, Tainan
Continental or transcontinental
Australia	Sydney
Kazakhstan	Almaty
Russia	Moscow, Saint Petersburg
Turkey	Istanbul
Africa
Algeria	Algiers
Egypt	Cairo
Ivory Coast	Abidjan
Kenya	Nairobi
Nigeria	Lagos
South Africa	Johannesburg
Americas
Brazil	São Paulo
Canada	Toronto, Vancouver
Mexico	Mexico City
United States	Chicago, Los Angeles, Miami, New York, San Francisco
Asia
Bangladesh	Dhaka
Cambodia	Phnom Penh
China	Beijing, Chengdu, Dalian, Guangzhou, Nanjing, Nanning, Qingdao, Shanghai, Wuhan, Xiamen
Hong Kong	Wan Chai
India	Chennai, Kolkata, Mumbai, New Delhi
Indonesia	Jakarta
Iran	Tehran
Israel	Tel Aviv
Japan	Fukuoka, Osaka, Tokyo
Kuwait	Kuwait City
Malaysia	Kuala Lumpur
Myanmar	Yangon
Philippines	Manila
Saudi Arabia	Riyadh
Singapore	Suntec City
South Korea	Seoul
Thailand	Bangkok
United Arab Emirates	Dubai
Vietnam	Ho Chi Minh City
Sri Lanka	Colombo
Europe
Bulgaria	Sofia
France	Paris
Germany	Düsseldorf, Munich
Hungary	Budapest
Italy	Milan
Netherlands	Rotterdam
Poland	Warsaw
Romania	Bucharest
Spain	Barcelona
Ukraine	Kyiv
United Kingdom	London

== See also ==
- Taipei World Trade Center
- Taipei Nangang Exhibition Center
- Hong Kong Trade Development Council
