= Trade show =

Exhibition for companies of a specific industry to present their new products

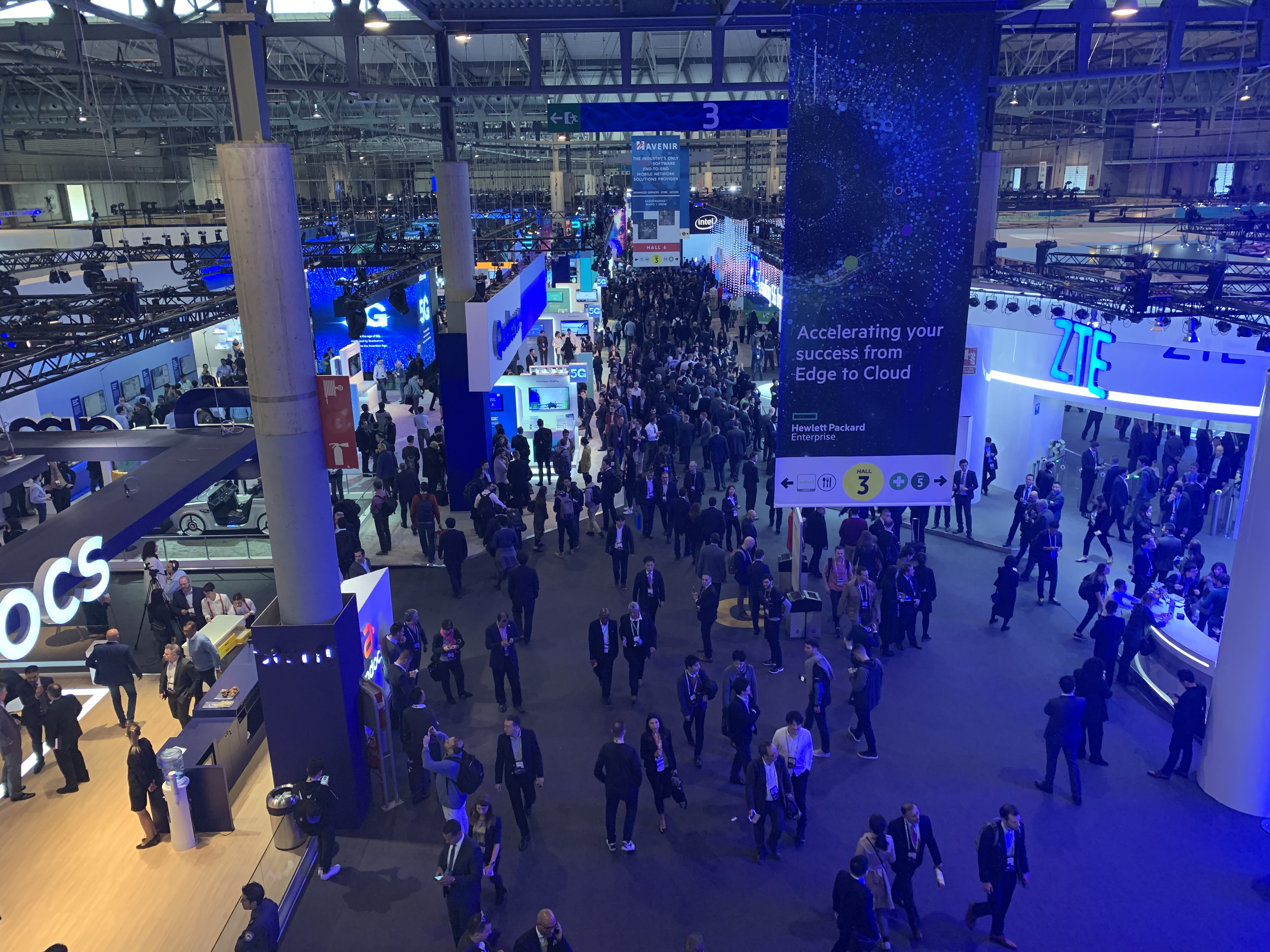
Stands during MWC Barcelona 2019, a trade show for the mobile communications industry in Barcelona, Spain

A trade show, also known as a trade fair, trade exhibition, or trade exposition, is an organized event at which companies in a particular industry showcase and demonstrate products and services, meet customers and industry partners, assess competitors, and examine market trends and opportunities.

In contrast to consumer shows, only some trade shows are open to the public, while others can only be attended by company representatives (members of the trade, e.g. professionals) and members of the press. Therefore trade shows are classified as either "public" or "trade only". A few shows are hybrids of the two; one example is the Frankfurt Book Fair, which is trade only for its first three days and open to the general public on its final two days. They are held on a continuing basis in virtually all markets and normally attract companies from around the globe. For example, in the U.S., there are currently over 10,000 trade shows held every year, and several online directories have been established to help organizers, attendees, and marketers identify appropriate events.

== History ==
Modern trade shows follow in the tradition of trade fairs established in late medieval Europe such as the Champagne fairs or the Skåne Market, in the era of merchant capitalism. In this era, produce and craft producers visited towns for trading fairs, to sell and showcase products. These markets were held annually or on several specific days a year, usually at geographically particularly favorable locations and in conjunction with a religious festival in order to benefit from the rush of the public. The tradition of fairs taking place in spring and autumn has been preserved in some cases until today. From the late eighteenth century, industrial exhibitions in Europe and North America became more common reflecting the technological dynamism of the Industrial Revolution.

In the late 19th century, the concept of annual industry-wide trade shows gained traction, spreading from European manufacturing centers to North America. By the 20th century, specialized companies came into existence simply to manage the trade-show industry, and permanent trade show grounds or convention centres were established as venues that featured a rotating calendar of trade shows.

In the 21st century, with the rapid industrialization of Asia, trade shows and exhibitions are now commonplace throughout the Asian continent, with China dominating the exhibitions industry in Asia, accounting for more than 55 per cent of all space sold in the region in 2011.

== Use ==
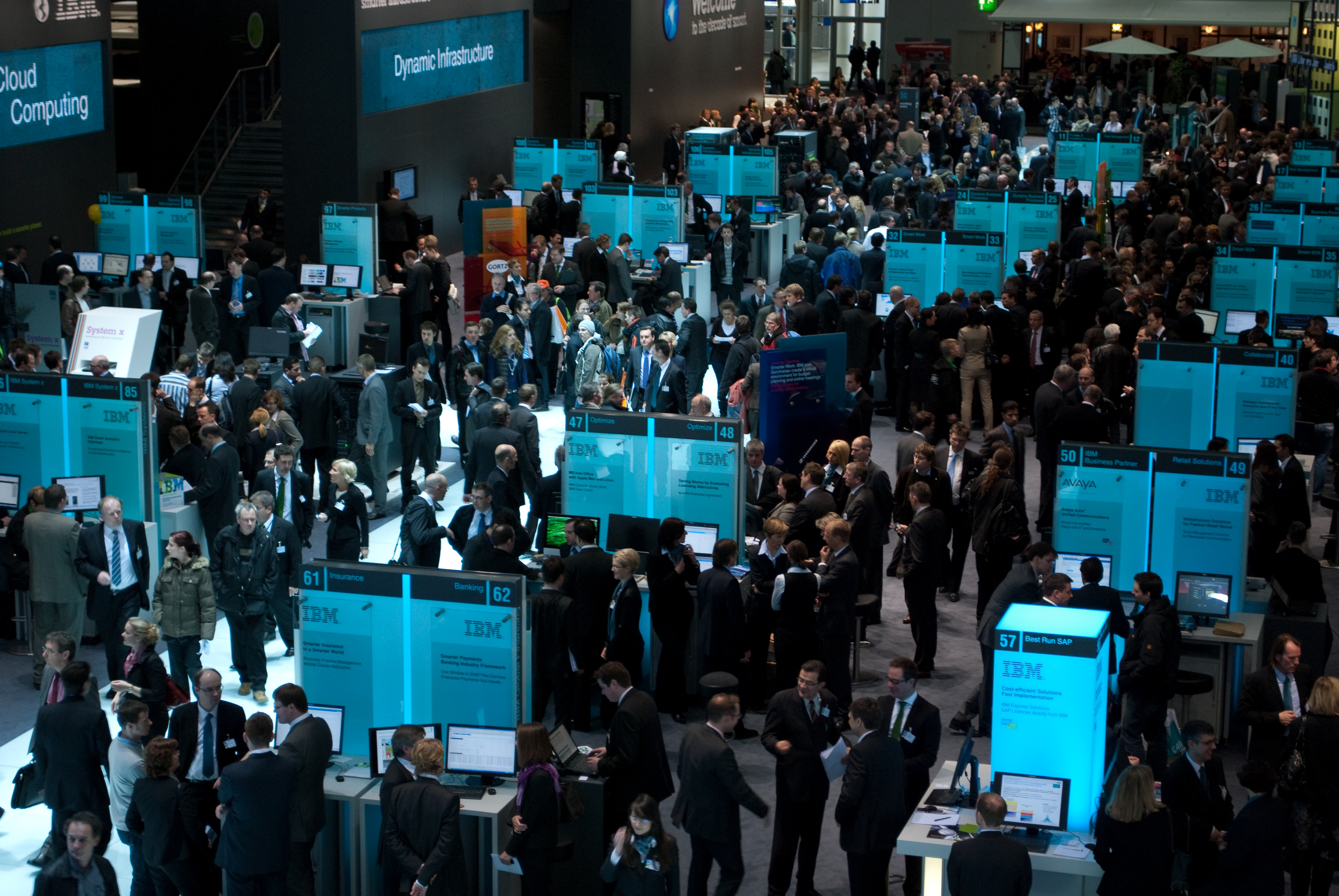
IBM stand during CeBIT 2010 at the Hanover Fairground, the largest exhibition ground in the world, in Hanover, Germany

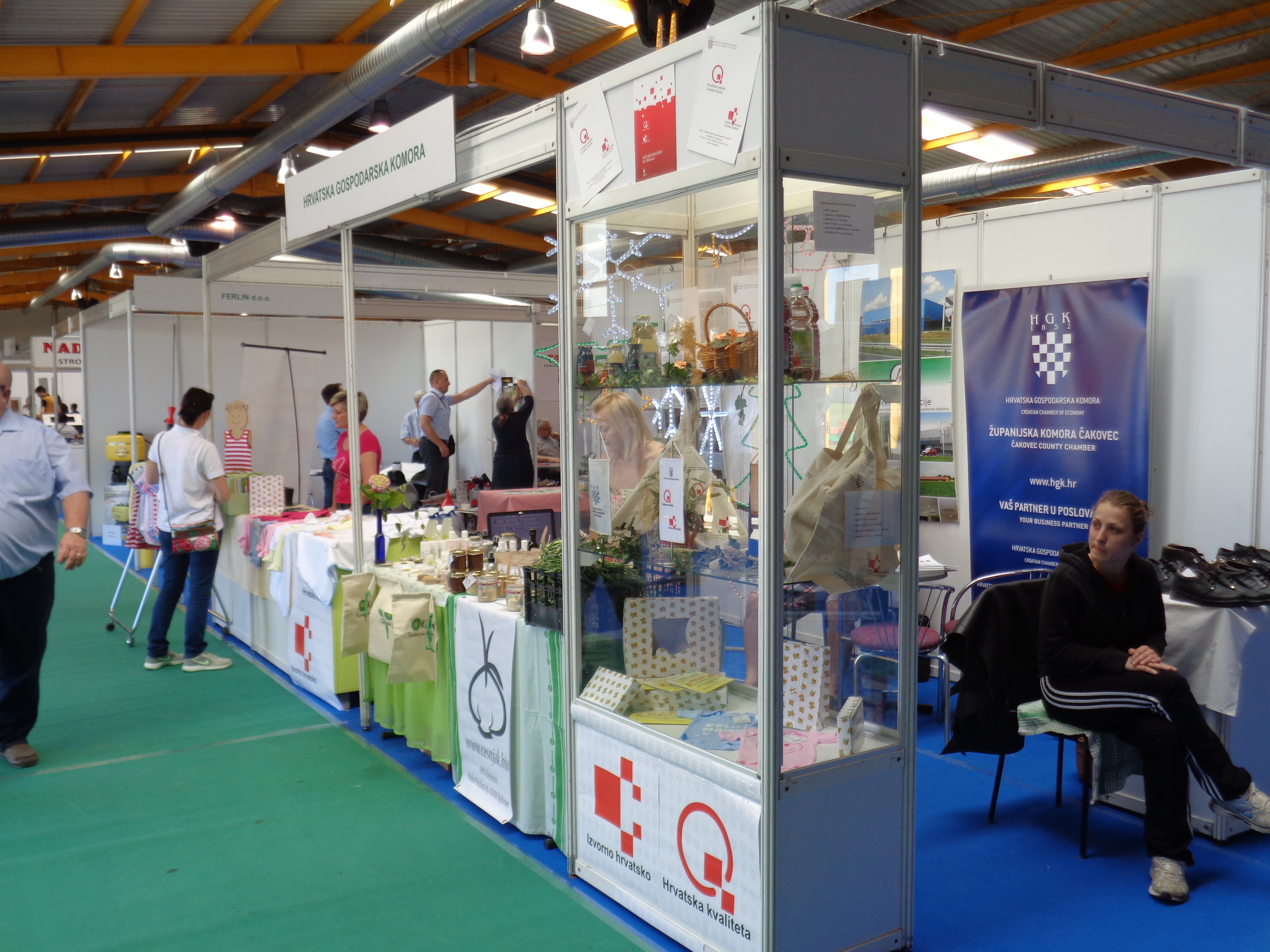
A small trade show in Croatia, with the exhibition booth of the Croatian Chamber of Economy

Trade shows play important roles in marketing as well as business networking in market sectors that use them. People will seek to meet people and companies at their own level in the supply chain, as well as potential suppliers and potential buyers.

Generally there will be a central trade show floor with booths where people exhibit their goods or services, and throughout the day there will be seminars for continuing education on matters relevant to the industry, like best practices, trends, and regulation. There will also be some shared meals with keynote speakers, and social events in the evenings. Booths range from simple tables to elaborate constructions.

Trade shows often involve a considerable investment in time and money by participating companies. The planning includes arranging meetings with other attendees beforehand and resources to follow up on opportunities that are created at the show. Costs include space rental, booth design and construction of trade show displays, telecommunications, travel, accommodations, and promotional literature and items to give to attendees.

In addition, costs are incurred at the show for services such as electrical, booth cleaning, internet services, and drayage (also known as material handling). This local spending on logistics leads cities to promote trade shows as a means of local economic development, as well as providing opportunities for local businesses to grow, and attracting new businesses.

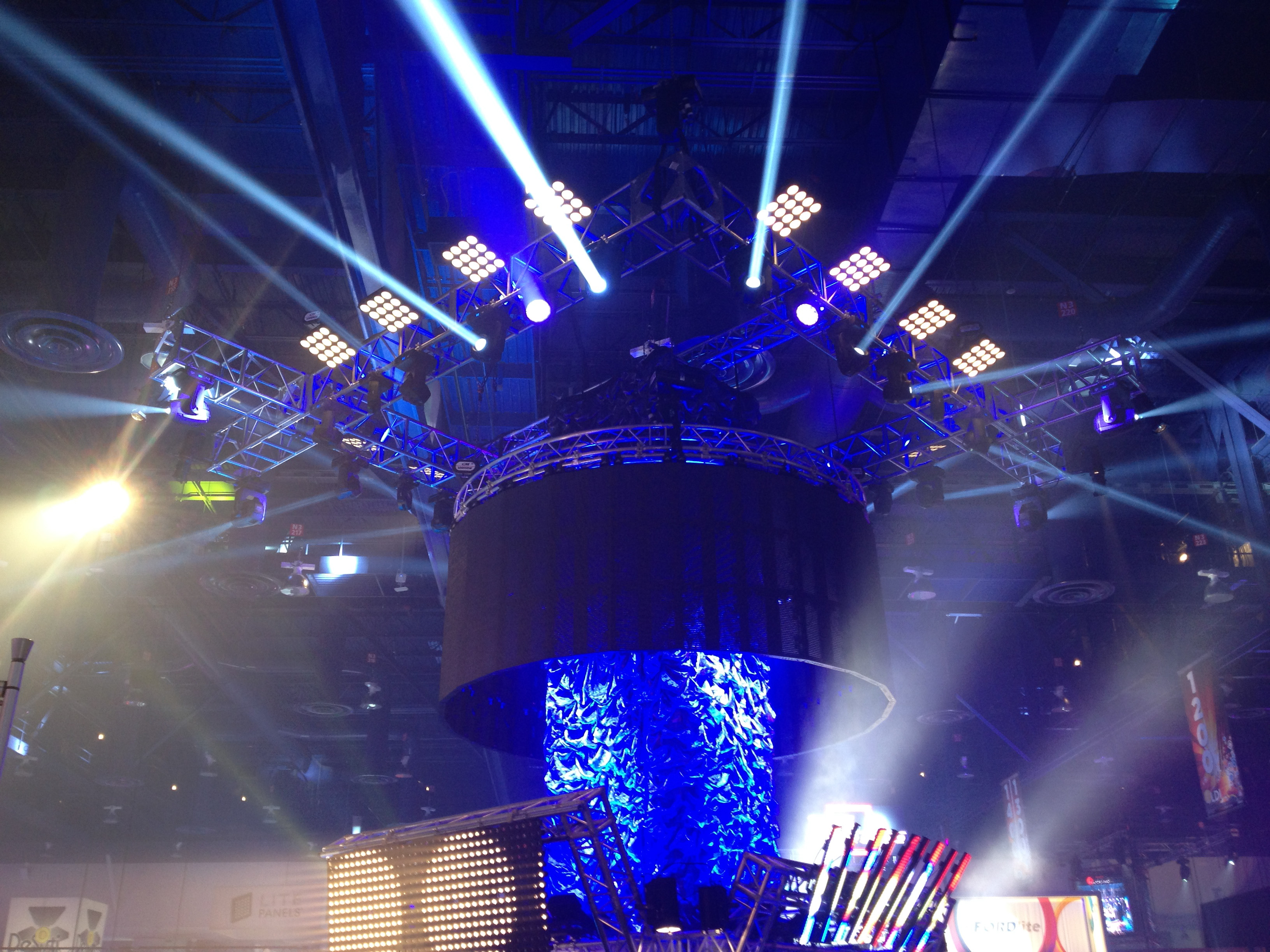
The large format work that can be done at international trade shows

== List of major venues ==
#	Ground	City	Country	Indoor floor area	Outdoor floor area
1	Hanover Fairground	Hanover	Germany	496,000 m^{2} (5,340,000 sq ft)	58,070 m^{2} (625,100 sq ft)
2	World Market Center Las Vegas	Las Vegas	United States	460,000 m^{2} (5,000,000 sq ft)	22,300 m^{2} (240,000 sq ft)
3	Messe Frankfurt	Frankfurt	Germany	366,600 m^{2} (3,946,000 sq ft)	96,000 m^{2} (1,030,000 sq ft)
4	Fira de Barcelona	Barcelona	Spain	365,000 m^{2} (3,930,000 sq ft)	50,000 m^{2} (540,000 sq ft)
5	Fiera Milano	Milan	Italy	345,000 m^{2} (3,710,000 sq ft)	60,000 m^{2} (650,000 sq ft)
6	Canton Fair Complex	Guangzhou	China	338,000 m^{2} (3,640,000 sq ft)	43,600 m^{2} (469,000 sq ft)
7	Yashobhoomi	Delhi	India	300,000 m^{2} (3,200,000 sq ft)	71,000 m^{2} (760,000 sq ft)
8	Las Vegas Convention Center	Winchester, Nevada (Las Vegas)	United States	297,000 m^{2} (3,200,000 sq ft)	
9	Koelnmesse	Cologne	Germany	284,000 m^{2} (3,060,000 sq ft)	100,000 m^{2} (1,100,000 sq ft)
10	Messe Düsseldorf	Düsseldorf	Germany	262,740 m^{2} (2,828,100 sq ft)	43,000 m^{2} (460,000 sq ft)
11	McCormick Place	Chicago	United States	248,000 m^{2} (2,670,000 sq ft)	
12	Parc des Expositions de Villepinte	Paris	France	246,300 m^{2} (2,651,000 sq ft)	
13	Paris expo Porte de Versailles	Paris	France	227,000 m^{2} (2,440,000 sq ft)	
14	Taipei Nangang Exhibition Center	Taipei	Taiwan	202,060 m^{2} (2,175,000 sq ft)	
15	Feria de Madrid IFEMA	Madrid	Spain	200,000 m^{2} (2,200,000 sq ft)	
16	National Exhibition Centre	Solihull, UK	United Kingdom	186,000 m^{2} (2,000,000 sq ft)	100,000 m^{2} (1,100,000 sq ft)
17	Messe München	Munich	Germany	180,000 m^{2} (1,900,000 sq ft)	425,000 m^{2} (4,570,000 sq ft)
18	Messe Nürnberg	Nuremberg	Germany	180,000 m^{2} (1,900,000 sq ft)	50,000 m^{2} (540,000 sq ft)
19	Messe Berlin	Berlin	Germany	160,000 m^{2} (1,700,000 sq ft)	390,000 m^{2} (4,200,000 sq ft)
20	Bilbao Exhibition Centre	Barakaldo	Spain	150,000 m^{2} (1,614,586 sq ft)	100,000 m^{2} (1,100,000 sq ft)

== List of major trade shows ==
Fairs with a published attendance of more than 50,000
Title	Description	Dates	Location	Visitors
AgQuip	Agriculture	August 22–24, 2017	Gunnedah, New South Wales, Australia	100,000 approximately in 2005
AI Expo Taiwan	Artificial intelligence	March 25, 2026	Taipei Expo Park, Taipei, Taiwan	50,000 approximately in 2025
ANUGA	Food and beverage	October 7–11, 2017	Koelnmesse, Germany	165,000 approximately in 2017
Arab Health	Healthcare	January 24, 2022 - January 27, 2022	Dubai World Trade Centre, United Arab Emirates	58,028 in 2022
Automechanika	Automotive aftermarket	September 13–17, 2016	Messe Frankfurt, Germany	136,000
BAUMA	Construction	April 8–17, 2019	Munich, Germany	620,000 in 2019
Beef Australia	Beef	May (triennially)	Rockhampton, Australia	90,000 in 2015
Berlin Music Week	Music	September 3–7, 2014	Berlin, Germany	70,000 in 2012
Bologna Motor Show	Auto show	December 3–11, 2016	Bologna, Italy	450,000 in 2013
boot Düsseldorf	Boats	January 21–29, 2017	Messe Düsseldorf, Germany	267,379 in 2008
International Machine Tool Exhibition (BIEMH)	Machine tool	Biennial	Bilbao, Spain	39,063 in 2026
Buenos Aires International Book Fair	Books	April 27 – May 15, 2017	Buenos Aires, Argentina	1,240,000 in 2008
Cairo International Book Fair	Books	January 27, 2017 - February 10, 2017	Cairo, Egypt	2,000,000 in 2007
Canton Fair	Consumer and industry products	Spring session: April 15–19 (Phase 1); April 23–27 (Phase 2); May 1–5 (Phase 3). (111th Session) Autumn session: October 15–19 (Phase 1); October 23–27 (Phase 2); October 31- November 4 (Phase 3).	Guangzhou, China	192,013 in Spring Session 2008
CeBIT	Information and communication technology	March 20–24	Hanover, Germany	480,000 in 2007
CES (Consumer Electronics Show)	Consumer electronics	Jan 7 – Jan 10, Every Year	Las Vegas Convention Center, United States	
Comic Market	Comics	August 11–13, 2017	Tokyo, Japan	550,000 in Summer Session 2008
COMPUTEX Taipei	Computer show	May 30, 2017 – June 3, 2017	Taipei, Taiwan	106,517 in 2008
CONEXPO-CON/AGG	Construction	March 7–11, 2017	Las Vegas Convention Center, United States	145,000 approximately in 2008
Creative Expo Taiwan	Cultural and creative industries; design; brands and licensing; crafts	August 2, 2025	Taipei Nangang Exhibition Center, Taipei, Taiwan	650,000 in 2025
Dhaka International Trade Fair	Consumer products	January 1 - January 31, Every Year	Bangabandhu Exhibition Center, Dhaka, Bangladesh	Hundreds of Thousands
Drupa	Printing equipment	May 31 – June 10, 2016	Messe Düsseldorf, Germany	393,654 in 2004 from 127 countries
Dubai Airshow	Aerospace	Biennial	Dubai World Central, United Arab Emirates	
Ekushey Book Fair	Books	February 1 - February 28, Every Year	Bangla Academy, Ramna, Dhaka, Bangladesh	70,000
E3 (Electronic Entertainment Expo)	Video games	June 13–15, 2017	Los Angeles, California, United States	68,400 (2017)
EAA AirVenture Oshkosh	Aerospace	Last week of July, yearly	Wittman Regional Airport, Oshkosh, Wisconsin, United States	686,000 in 2024
EICMA	Motorcycles	November 10–13, 2016	Fiera Milano, Italy	504,999 in 2008
Euroflora	Flower show	April/May once time every 5 years	Genoa, Italy	730,000 in 1986
EuroShop	Retailing	March 5–09, 2017	Messe Düsseldorf, Germany	104,766 in 2008
Farnborough Air Show	Aerospace	16–22 July 2018	Farnborough Airport, Hampshire, United Kingdom	209,000 (2012)
Feria Internacional de Muestras de Asturias (FIDMA)	Trade fair	Yearly (August)	Gijón, Spain	751,412 (2026)
Fieracavalli	Horse show	November 10–13, 2016	Verona, Italy	125,975 in 2008
Fiera internazionale del libro	Books	May 18–22, 2017	Turin, Italy	300,000 in 2007
Frankfurt Book Fair	Books	October 11–15, 2017	Messe Frankfurt, Germany	280,194 in 2011
Games Convention	Video games	ended 2008	Leipzig, Germany	203,000 in 2008
Gamescom	Video games	August 21–25, 2018	Koelnmesse, Germany	350,000 in 2017
Genoa International Boat Show	Boats	September 21–26, 2017	Genoa, Italy	236,322 in 2008
GITEX	Consumer electronics	March 29, 2007 – April 1, 2017	Dubai, United Arab Emirates	146,000 in 2016
Hannover Messe	Industry, technology	April 24–28, 2017	Hanover, Germany	193,222 in 2008
High Point Market	Furniture	April and October	High Point, North Carolina, United States	70,000-80,000
IFA	Consumer electronics and home appliances	September 1–6, 2017	Berlin, Germany	240,000 in 2016
IITF (India International Trade Fair)	Consumer products	Mid-November	Delhi, India	
imm Cologne	Furniture	January 15–21, 2018	Koelnmesse, Germany	106,677 in 2008
IMTS	Industry, technology	September 9–14, 2024	McCormick Place,Chicago, Illinois, United States	89,020 in 2024
InnoTrans	Rail Transport Technology	September 22–25, 2020	Messe Berlin, Germany	106,612 in 2010
Intermot	Motorcycles	October 3–7, 2018	Koelnmesse, Germany	203,000 in 2012
International CES	Consumer electronics	January 9–12, 2018	Las Vegas Convention Center, Nevada, United States	177,000+ in 2016
Internationale Automobil-Ausstellung	Cars	September 14–29, 2017	Messe Frankfurt, Germany	931,700 in 2015
IGW Berlin	Sustainable agriculture	January 20–29, 2017	Messe Berlin, Germany	424,502 in 2008
ITB Berlin	tourism	March 10–12, 2017	Messe Berlin, Germany	149,776 in 2008
International Technical Fair	machine engineering, automobiles, transport, information technologies, software, electronics, electrical engineering, construction, chemistry, power engineering, ecology	September 25–30, 2017	Plovdiv, Bulgaria	141,000 in 2006
Jakarta Fair	Retail (Cars and motorcycles, electronics, sports equipment, fashion accessories and garments, to household utilities, furniture, food, handcrafts, herbs and medicine, cosmetics, banking services and many others)	May 22–30, 2019	Jakarta, Indonesia	
Kolkata International Book Fair	Books	Late January - Early February	Kolkata, India	2,000,000 in 2012 - largest book fair in the world
Light + Building	Architectural lighting design	March 18–23, 2018	Messe Frankfurt, Germany	167,084 in 2008
MEDICA Trade Fair	Medical technology	November 13–16, 2017	Messe Düsseldorf, Germany	136,871 in 2008
Mobile World Congress	Mobile telephony, communications	February 27, 2023 – March 2, 2023	Barcelona, Spain	95,000 in 2023
SIAL Paris	Food industry	October 15, 2022 - October 18, 2022	Paris, France	310,000 in 2018
Mondial de l'Automobile	Auto show	September 29, 2016 – October 16, 2016	Paris, France	1,400,000 in 2006
NAB Show	Broadcasting	April 6–09, 2025	Las Vegas Convention Center, Nevada, United States	61,000+ in 2024
The NAMM Show	Music	January 16–19, 2020	Anaheim, California, United States	115,888
NAIAS	Cars	January 14–21, 2018	Detroit, Michigan, United States	800,000 in 2018
National Agricultural Fieldays	Agriculture	4 days in mid June	Hamilton, New Zealand	125,878 in 2007
Novi Sad Fair	Agriculture	Middle of May	Novi Sad, Serbia	600,000
Nuremberg International Toy Fair	Toys, Games	February 1–6, 2017	Nuremberg, Germany	80,000 in 2011
Paris International Agricultural Show	Agricultural show	February 25, 2017 - March 5, 2017	Paris, France	619,000 in 2017
Paris Air Show - SIAE	Aerospace	June 19–25, 2017	Paris, France	322,000 in 2017
Photokina	Photography	May 27–30, 2020	Koelnmesse, Germany	180,000 in 2018
Salone del Mobile (International Furniture Fair)	Furniture	March 2007	FieraMilano, Italy	270,000 in 2007
SEMA Show	Automobile aftermarket	First week of November	Las Vegas, Nevada, United States	125,000 in 2014
Semicon Taiwan	semiconductors	September 4, 2024	Taipei, Taiwan	85,000 in 2025
SHOT Show	Firearms	January 22–25, 2019	Sands Expo, Las Vegas, Nevada, United States	60,000+ in 2018
SIMA	Real estate	May 25–28, 2017	Madrid, Spain	122,760 in 2008
SIMO TCI	Consumer electronics	October 18–20, 2017	Madrid, Spain	300,000 approximately
Sydney Royal Easter Show	Agriculture	14 days over Easter	Sydney, Australia	900,000 in 2007
Taipei AMPA	Auto shows	April 23, 2025	Taipei, Taiwan	55,000 in 2025
Taipei Game Show	Video games	February 24, 2025	Taipei, Taiwan	370,000 in 2025
Taipei International Book Exhibition	Books	February 4–9, 2025	Taipei, Taiwan	570,000 in 2025
Taiwan International Agricultural Machinery and Materials Exhibition	agricultural machinery, equipment, and materials	October 25, 2025	Yunlin HSR station, Yunlin County, Taiwan	800,000 in 2025
TAIROS	Robots	August 20, 2024	Taipei, Taiwan	320,000 in 2024
Tehran International Book Fair	Books	May 3–13, 2017	Tehran, Iran	2,000,000 approximately in 2010
The Big 5	Construction	November 26–29, 2017 (annual)	Dubai, UAE	78,579 participants in 2016
Thessaloniki International Fair	General	Annually	Thessaloniki, Greece	250,000 in 2011
Tokyo Motor Show	Auto shows	October 27, 2017 - November 5, 2017	Tokyo, Japan	1,512,100 in 2005
Tokyo Game Show	Video games	September 21–24, 2017	Tokyo, Japan	271,224 in 2016
Trade Expo Indonesia	Export	October 24–28, 2018	BSD City, Indonesia	28,000
World Ag Expo	Agriculture	Annually	Tulare, California, United States	Approx. 100,000 annually
World Dairy Expo	Dairy industry	October 3-03, 2017	Alliant Energy Center, 2015 at Madison, Wisconsin, United States	75,000

== See also ==
- Agricultural show
- Buyers Market of American Craft
- County fair
- Lead retrieval
- List of world's fairs
- Rodeo
- Sample fair
- State fair
- World's fair
- Hall of Nations
