= A+A =

German trade fair

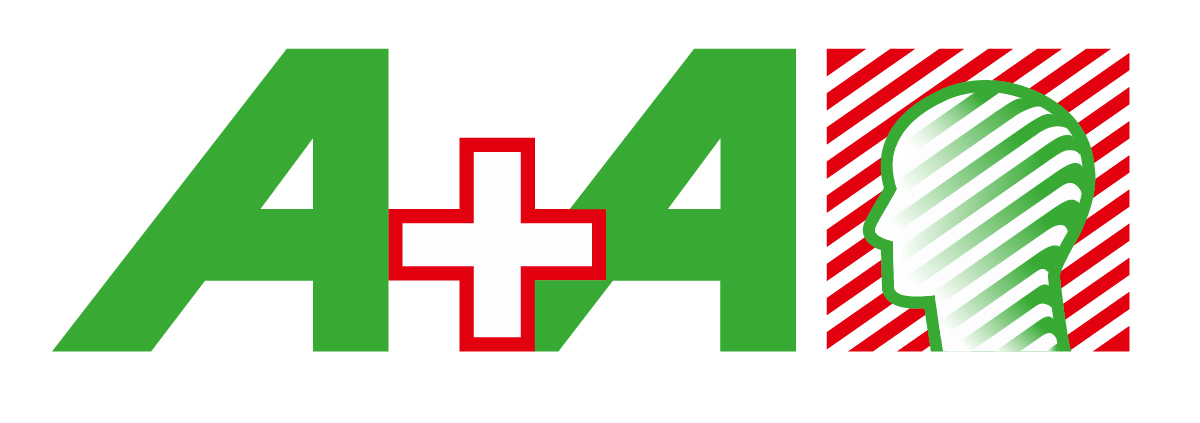

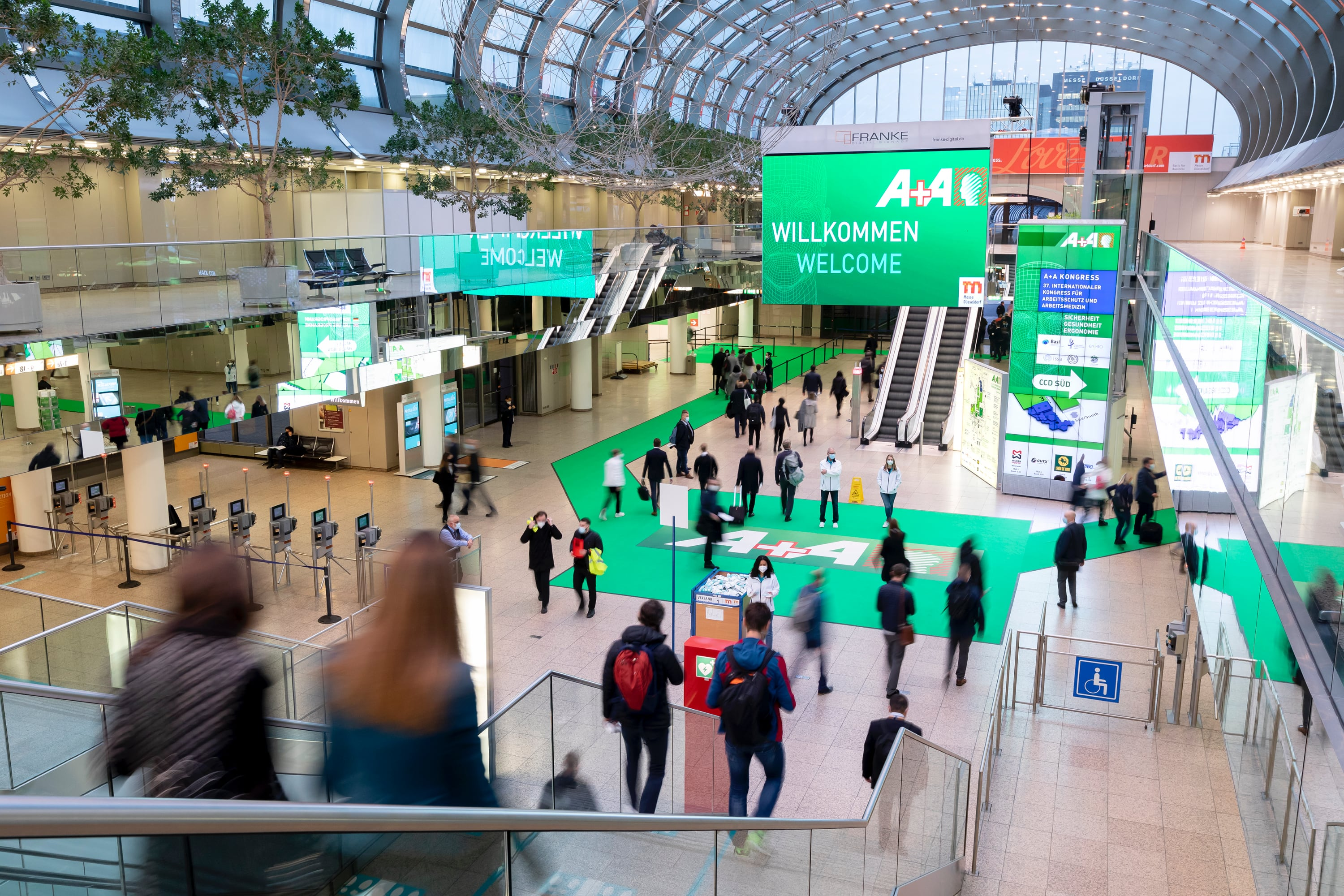
- Status: Active
- Genre: Trade fair
- Frequency: Biennial
- Locations: Düsseldorf, Germany
- Inaugurated: 1954
- Most recent: November 4–7, 2025
- Next event: October 19–22, 2027
- Participants: 2,335 exhibitors (2025)
- Attendance: 66,636 (2025)
- Organizer: Messe Düsseldorf
- Website: www.aplusa.de

A+A is an international trade fair for occupational safety and health and occupational medicine, held every two years in Düsseldorf, Germany. First held in 1954, it is organized by Messe Düsseldorf and has been described as the world's largest trade fair of its kind. An international congress runs alongside the fair, together with forums, seminars, and live demonstrations. Messe Düsseldorf also stages occupational safety fairs in China, Turkey, Singapore, and Thailand, among other countries.

== History ==
A+A grew out of a congress that was accompanied by a small exhibition. The first event took place in Düsseldorf in 1954 and focused on occupational safety and occupational medicine. The name is derived from the German terms for these two fields, Arbeitsschutz and Arbeitsmedizin. According to Messe Düsseldorf, 74 exhibitors and about 2,000 visitors attended the first event. In 1971, the event was held at Düsseldorf's new exhibition grounds for the first time, and the congress was accompanied by an international trade exhibition.

From 2009 to 2021, the German Occupational Safety Award (Deutscher Arbeitsschutzpreis) was presented at A+A every two years. It is awarded by the Federal Ministry of Labour and Social Affairs, the German states, and the German Social Accident Insurance (DGUV). The 2025 award ceremony was held in Berlin.

=== Recent developments ===
In 2021, during the COVID-19 pandemic, about 1,200 exhibitors and 25,000 trade visitors attended A+A. The congress was held in a hybrid format for the first time. In 2023, the fair had 2,200 exhibitors from 58 countries and around 62,000 trade visitors from 140 countries, with a spotlight on digitalization and sustainability.

The fair held from November 4 to 7, 2025, had 2,335 exhibitors from 69 countries and 66,636 visitors, according to figures audited by the German trade fair statistics body FKM. The next A+A is scheduled for October 19 to 22, 2027.

== Concept ==
=== Topics and focal points ===
A+A covers occupational safety, workplace health promotion, and ergonomic workplace design. The range of exhibits also includes personal protective equipment and workwear. The 2025 fair was held under the motto "People Matter" (Der Mensch zählt).

=== Exhibitors and visitors ===
In 2025, A+A occupied 13 exhibition halls. About 79 percent of the exhibitors and 52 percent of the visitors came from outside Germany.

=== Congress and forums ===
Held alongside the trade fair is the international A+A Congress, which addresses national and global workplace safety issues. Until 2025, it was organized by the German Federal Association for Occupational Safety and Health (Basi). The 39th congress in November 2025 drew about 3,000 participants. In October 2026, the general meeting of Basi voted to dissolve the association. The congress is to continue under the umbrella of the German Social Accident Insurance, starting with the 40th congress in October 2027.

Beyond the fair and congress, A+A offers specialized forums, seminars, and live demonstrations. WearRAcon Europe, a conference on exoskeletons, was held as part of the congress in 2023 and 2025.

=== Additional events ===
In addition to A+A in Düsseldorf, the portfolio of Messe Düsseldorf includes further occupational safety fairs: CIOSH in Shanghai, which is organized jointly with a Chinese trade association, OS+H Asia in Singapore, TOS+H Expo in Istanbul, CIOSH Thailand in Bangkok, and JIOSH+W in Japan. The first OS+H Middle East in Dubai has been announced for May 2027.
