= All in Caravaning =

The All in Caravaning show is a caravaning and camping industry show held every year in Beijing, China. Established by Messe Düsseldorf (Shanghai) Co., Ltd, a subsidiary of Messe Düsseldorf GmbH, the show is tailored to meet the specific needs in China and Asia market since the year of 2012.

All in Caravaning showcases a wide spectrum of motorhomes, caravans, mobile homes, basic vehicles and accessories as well as the diverse offers for holidays and recreation.

== Co-organizers ==
- Messe Düsseldorf (Shanghai) Co., Ltd.
- YASN International Exhibition Co., Ltd.
- China National Travel Service (HK) Group Corporation
- The Recreational Vehicle Industry Committee of China Association of Automotive Manufacturers (CAAM)
- China Self-Driving Tour and Camping & Caravaning Association (STCCA）of CTACA

== Statistics ==
AIC 2012	Total gross exhibition area (m^{2}): Total exhibitors: Total visitors:	5,000m^{2} 53 10,241
AIC 2013	Total gross exhibition area (m^{2}): Total exhibitors: Total visitors:	11,000m^{2} 99 19,200
AIC 2014	Total gross exhibition area (m^{2}): Total exhibitors: Total visitors:	20,000m^{2} 183 5,231
AIC 2015	Total gross exhibition area (m^{2}): Total exhibitors: Total visitors:	25,000m^{2} 194 11,507
