= Taiwan Innotech Expo =

Annual technology, invention, and intellectual property trade show in Taiwan

Taiwan Innotech Expo 台灣創新技術博覽會

- Status: Active
- Genre: Trade Show
- Frequency: Annual
- Venue: Taipei World Trade Center
- Country: Taiwan
- Inaugurated: October 1, 2015; 11 years ago
- Most recent: October 16, 2025; 12 months ago
- Next event: September 17, 2026; 48 days ago
- Organiser: Ministry of Economic Affairs (Taiwan)
- Website: https://www.inventaipei.com.tw/en/index.html

Taiwan Innotech Expo is an annual exhibition and trade show organized by Taiwan's Ministry of Economic Affairs. The show is held every autumn at the Taipei World Trade Center since 2015 and it covers technology, invention, and intellectual property in industries. The exhibition aims to promote commercialization of technology and innovation-driven industries across different industry sectors and strengthen intellectual property awareness.

In 2025, the event welcomed more than 50,000 visitors, with exhibitors from 19 countries and participants from over 65 countries. The event included technology forums, startup presentations and intellectual property exchange activities aimed to promote collaboration and technology transfer within the fields of artificial intelligence, smart manufacturing systems, semiconductor processes and biotechnology.

== See also ==
- Semiconductor industry in Taiwan
- Economy of Taiwan
- Semicon Taiwan
