= Leather industry in Bangladesh =

Bangladeshi Leather Bags

The leather industry is a major industry in Bangladesh and the Government of Bangladesh has declared it as a priority sector. The industry was the second largest export sector of Bangladesh in FY 2014–2015. The industry also plays a role in creating employment. However, Human Rights Watch reported that it is responsible for pollution of air, water, and soil, that lead to serious health problems in the population. It is also known to be largely involved in child labour.

Bangladesh experienced a notable surge in footwear exports to the United States, witnessing a significant increase of 64.40% to reach $451.40 million, compared to $274.58 million in 2021. This growth can be attributed to US buyers shifting their sourcing preferences from China and Vietnam. As per data from the US Department of Commerce, Bangladesh's leather footwear exports to the US market also witnessed a substantial rise of 63.25% in 2022, reaching $406.49 million, compared to $249 million in the previous year.

== Set up of tannery industry in Bangladesh ==
The first tannery in what is now Bangladesh was set up at Narayanganj sometime in the 1940s by the businessman Ranada Prasad Saha. The tannery was later shifted to Hazaribagh area in Dhaka. In 1965, there were 30 tanneries in Dhaka. After the independence of Bangladesh, Bangladesh Government acquired all 30 tanneries. The industry had a significant development in 1970s.

== Situation ==
Increasing interest from buyers has opened up an opportunity for footwear and leather industries of Bangladesh. The production of leather-made items has been increasing in the country. The sector has the potential for becoming the second largest foreign currency earner after ready-made garments. Industry analysts believe that Bangladesh's over one billion footwear industry has the potential to grow to a 15-billion dollar vibrant industry within a decade. According to EPB data, the leather industry has crossed the record $1-billion mark in 2012–13. Bangladesh earned $1.29 billion from exports of leather, leather goods and footwear in 2013–14 fiscal. The export target for 2014–15 has been set with an increase by 4.2 per cent. This rate of growth needs to be progressively accelerated to attain the target of $5 billion in 2020. Exports of leather and leather goods crossed $1 billion for the second year in fiscal 2014–15, according to data from the Export Promotion Bureau. The export of leather products have been gradually decreasing since FY 2016. There was brief spike in FY 2021. However it is $1.05 billion in 2025.

== Education ==
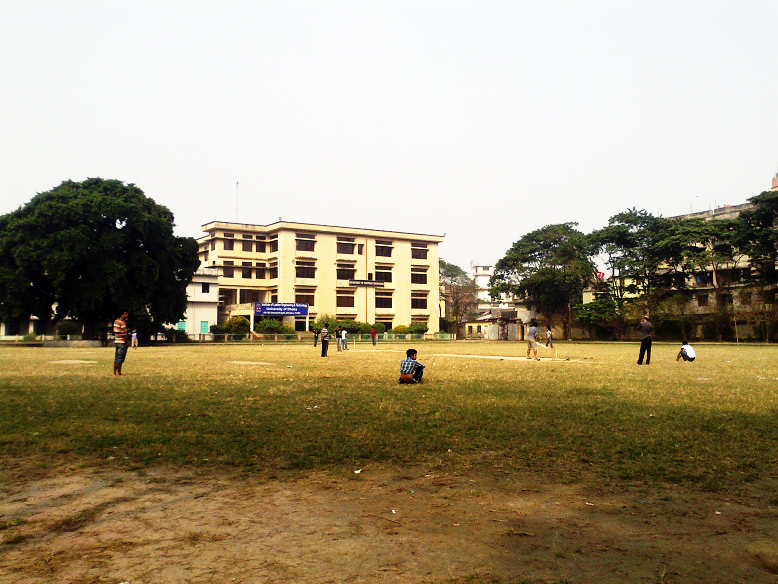
Institute of Leather Engineering and Technology

The Institute of Leather Engineering & Technology is an educational institution at Hazaribagh, Dhaka, Bangladesh that provides education related to making leather, leather products and footwear. The institute offers graduate courses through the University of Dhaka. It is an institute of University of Dhaka where admission is given through the admission test of A unit. It was the only educational institution of its kind in the country before Khulna University of Engineering & Technology introduced Leather Engineering Department for honours.

Khulna University of Engineering & Technology is another university which offers degree in Leather Engineering. The department of Leather Engineering started its journey 2010.

== Opportunities and challenges ==
Leather is a unique commodity that links grassroots villages with high societies and traditional practices with emerging technologies. For many developing countries, leather and leather manufacturers constitute an indispensable and dependable source for export trade and foreign exchange earnings. For Bangladesh, leather is a high priority industrial sector and footwear exports, an extreme focus area. Bangladesh has, just few decades since Independence, made significant gains from the leather trade, progressing from the status of an exporter of 90% plus raw hides and skins to that of an exporter and predominantly leather product manufacturer. However, there is little systematic research into this sector. This study is trying to address the research gap by seeking to understand the current status, problems and prospect of leather industry in Bangladesh.

It is notable that China, the world's largest footwear manufacturer, is now withdrawing from the global leather goods market. And Bangladesh is ready with huge potentials to attract foreign investments in the sector. According to a report, China's annual leather footwear production had dropped by 5.29 per cent in 2012 and 7.45 per cent in 2013. While asked about the reasons for China's focus shift, Bangladesh Footwear and Footwear Accessories Association (BFFAA) said labour cost in China has gone up. In consequence the Bangladeshi manufacturers are seeing brighter prospects for the leather sector after the readymade garment industry because of a policy shift in China, the world's largest economy.

Country's leather industry is facing a number of problems. The tanneries of Hazaribagh area in the capital have not been fully shifted to Savar where favourable conditions have been created as per the criteria set by most buyers. Technical know-how of the workers needs to be developed to cope up with new challenges in this industry.

== Leather goods manufacturers and suppliers ==
- A.S Leather Export Limited.
- Gardenia Footwear Limited.
- Loretta Leather Bangladesh Limited
- Sett Group International
- Helena Enterprise Ltd
- Bata Shoe Co. (Bangladesh) Ltd
- All Right Leather Corporation
- Dysin Chem. Ltd
- Jamuna Group
- Shafiq Leather Corporation Ltd
- Global Star Ltd
- Osfelle
- Charma Shilpa (Pvt.) Ltd
- Life Style & Co etc.
- Fortune Shoes Ltd.

== Sources ==
- Maksud, A K M; Hossain, K.R.; Sayed, S. and Arulanantham, A. (2021) Mapping of Children Engaged in the Worst Forms of Child Labour in the Supply Chain of the Leather Industry in Bangladesh, CLARISSA Emerging Evidence Report 5, Brighton: Institute of Development Studies, DOI: 10.19088/CLARISSA.2021.005
