= Light + Building =

Biennial architecture and technology trade fair

- Status: Active
- Genre: Lighting, Electrical engineering, Building automation, Civil-engineering software
- Frequency: Biennial (even years)
- Venue: Messe Frankfurt
- Locations: Frankfurt am Main, Germany
- Coordinates: 50.111°N 8.648°E
- Country: Germany
- Inaugurated: 2000
- Attendance: 151,192 (2024)
- Organizer: Messe Frankfurt GmbH
- Website: light-building.messefrankfurt.com

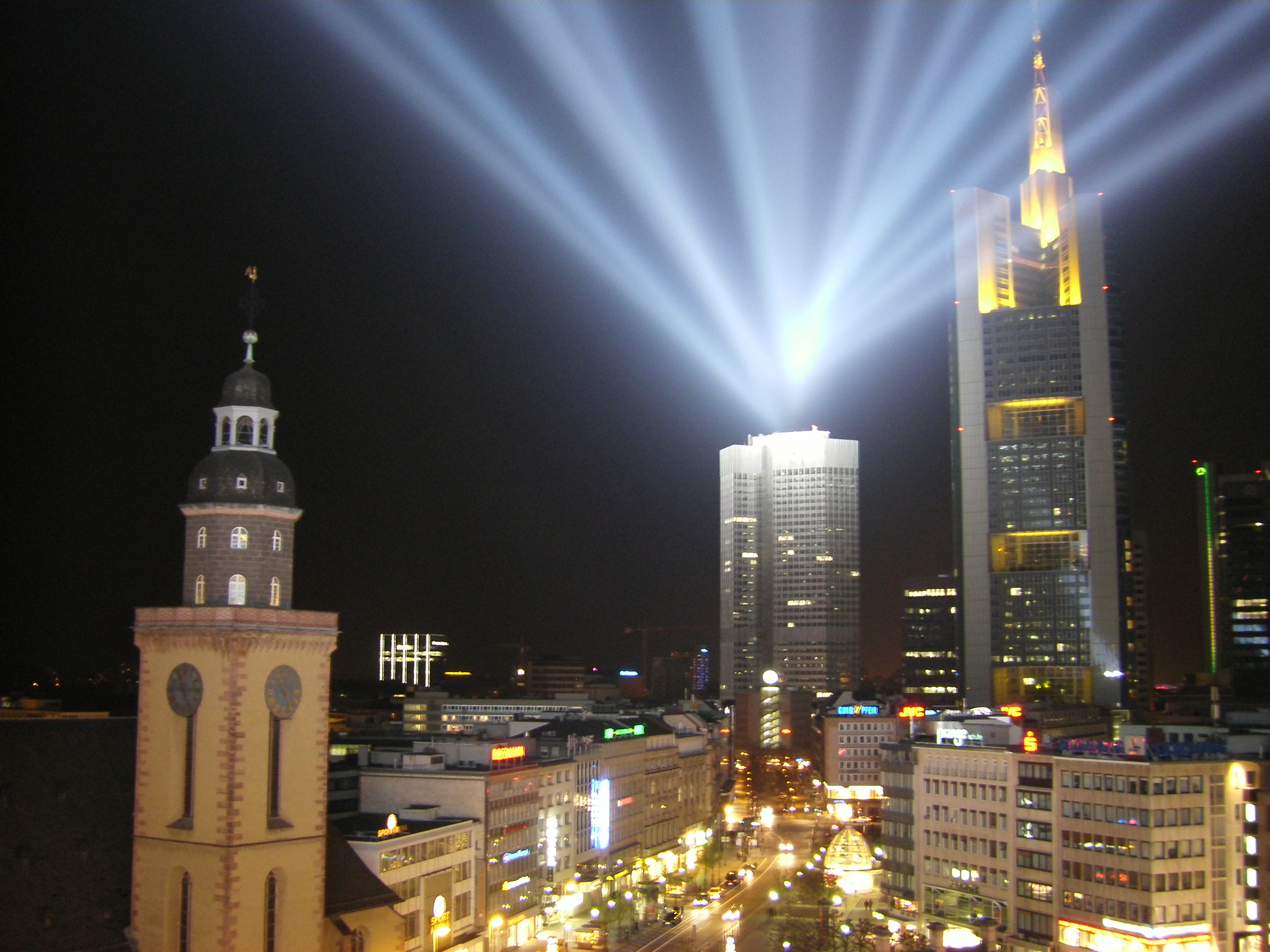
Light installation at Frankfurt luminale during Light + Building

Light + Building is a biennial architectural design and technology trade fair mainly focused on the fields of lighting, electrical engineering, building automation, and civil-engineering software. It is held at the Messe Frankfurt in Frankfurt am Main, Germany, and combined with the Luminale lighting design and art festival with installations and performances in and around the city.

Light + Building is the world's largest trade fair in its industry. In 2018, there were 2,719 exhibitors and 220,864 visitors, over half of them from abroad. Top visitors besides Germany were coming from China, Italy, the Netherlands, France and Belgium, as well as from emerging markets like Russia, India, Finland, Korea and Ukraine.

== See also ==
- imm Cologne
