= Imm Cologne =

German furniture and interior design trade fair

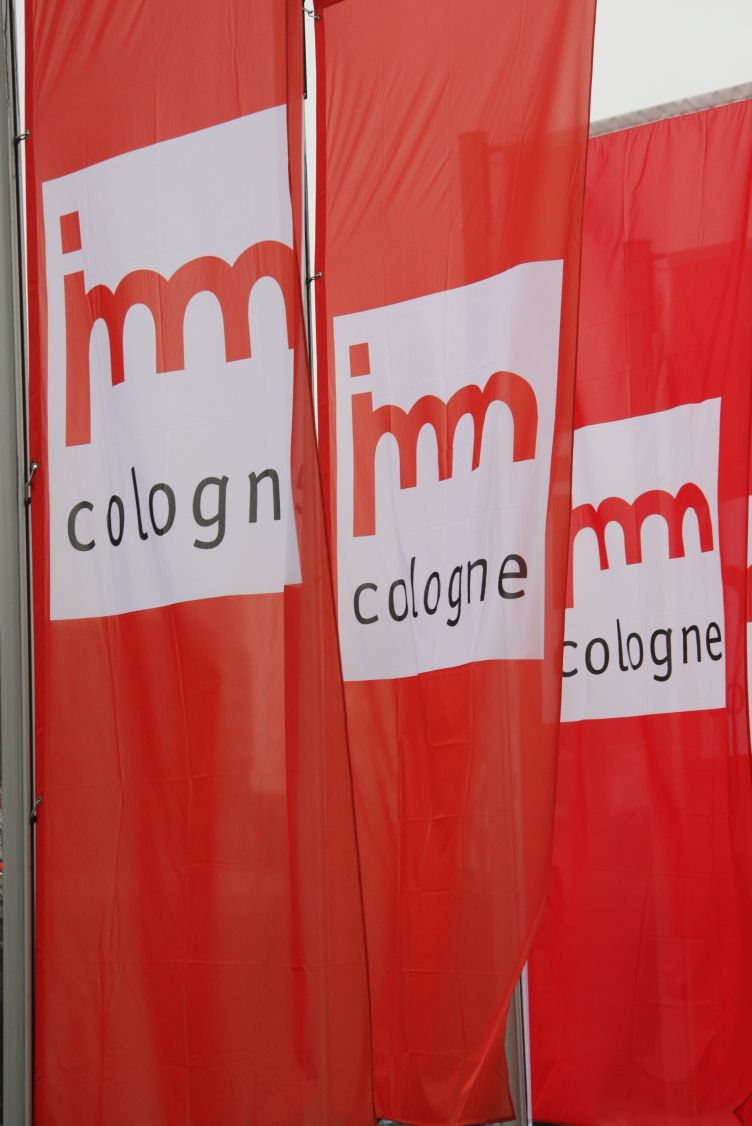
Flags of imm Cologne

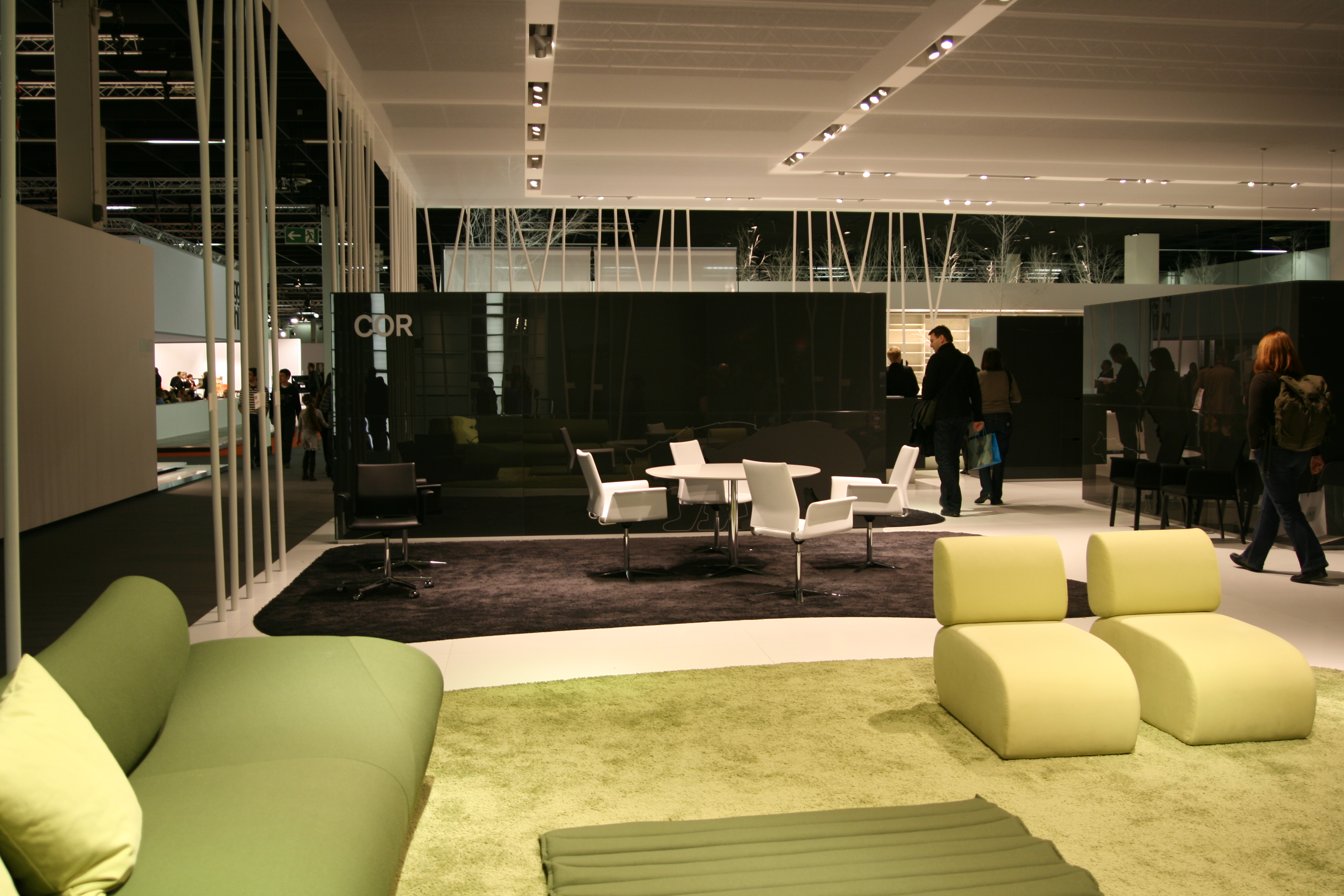
Cor by Interlübke (de) at imm Cologne 2009

The imm Cologne (internationale möbelmesse) is an international, publicly open furniture trade show held at Koelnmesse exhibition centre in Cologne, Germany, every year in January.

The exhibition's primary focus is contemporary furniture and interior design, but it also showcases innovative materials and fabrics and the latest architectural lighting design technology. Along the Salone del Mobile in Milan, the imm Cologne is regarded as a leading market place for related industries, i.e. furniture designers, furniture companies, furniture retailers, architects and interior designers. The 2018 show had some 1,250 exhibitors and attracted over 125,000 visitors. The first four days are reserved for professional visitors only and the last three days admit the general public. The working hours are from 09:00 am until 18:00 pm.

The Cologne Furniture Fair is organised by the Verband der Deutschen Möbelindustrie e.V. and was first held in 1949. Since the late 90s, the City of Cologne stages several events in conjunction with imm, namely the Cologne Design Week and Interior Design Week. Other groups include Design Champs and the international D^{3} Design Talents, with workshops for both young design professionals and design students.

== See also ==
- Art Cologne
- Interior Design Education
- Light + Building
