= MEDICA Trade Fair =

Trade fair for medical technology and healthcare products

MEDICA
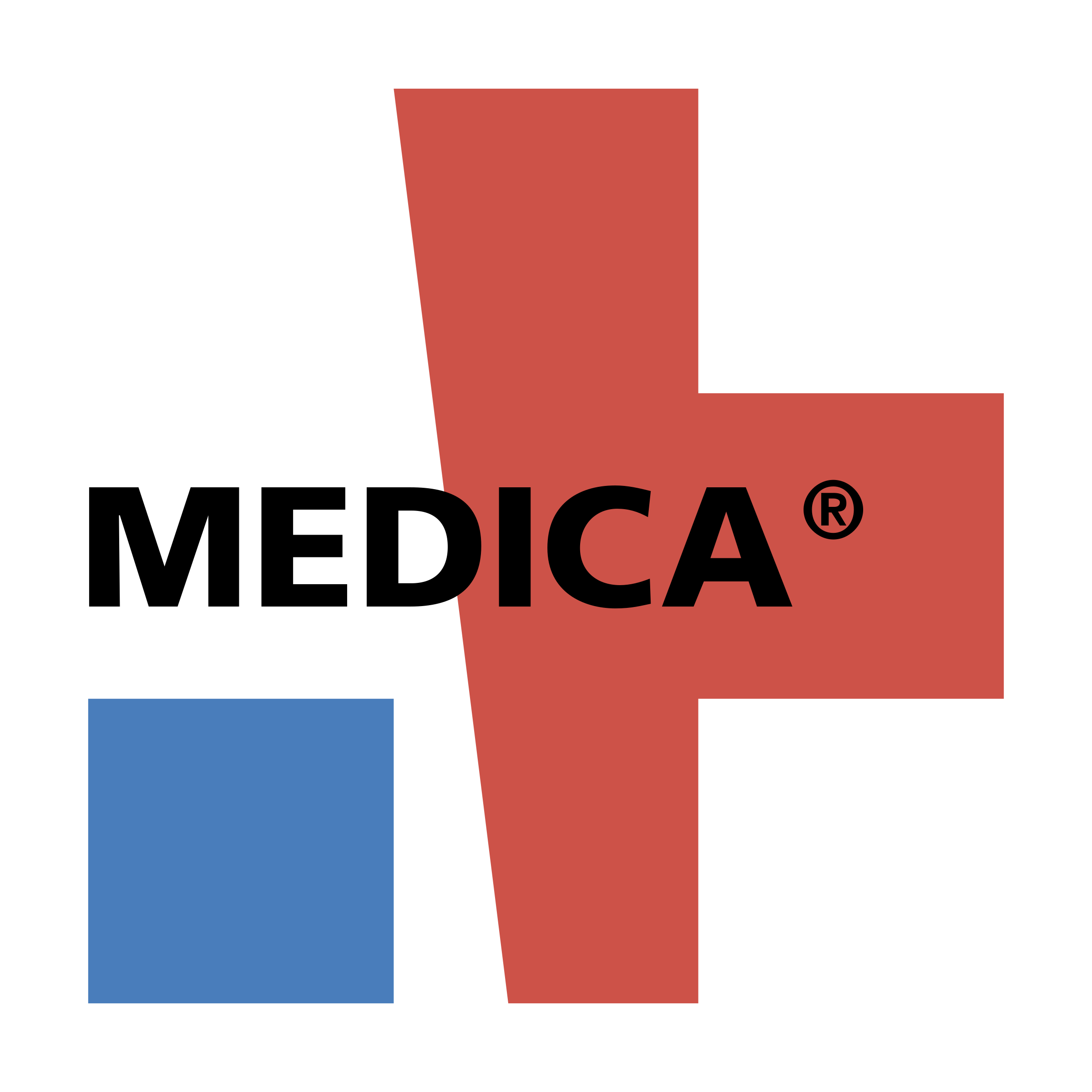

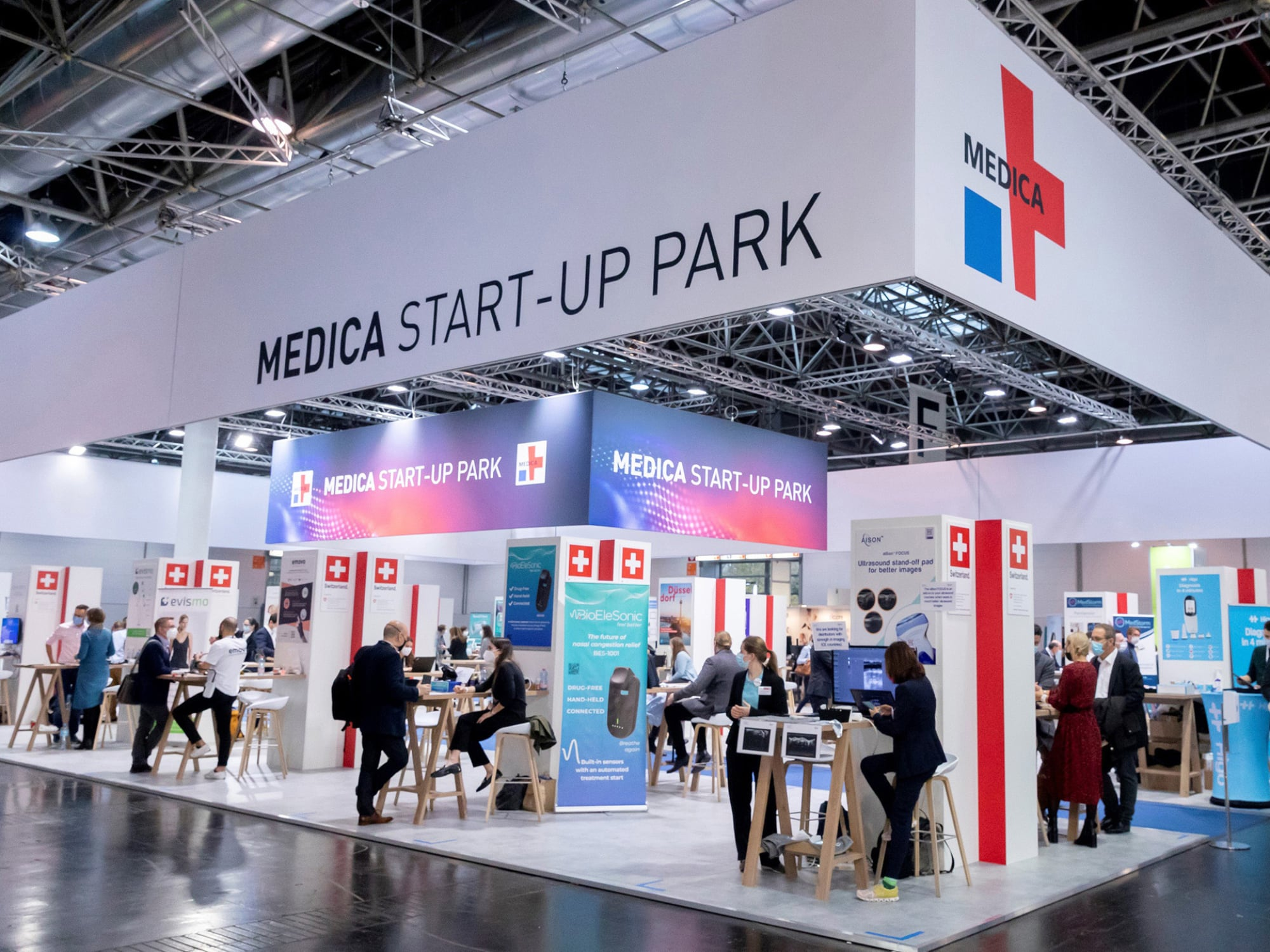
- Status: Active
- Genre: Trade fair
- Frequency: Annually
- Locations: Düsseldorf, Germany
- Inaugurated: 1969
- Most recent: November 2025
- Next event: November 2026
- Organiser: Messe Düsseldorf
- Website: www.medica-tradefair.com

MEDICA is a trade fair for medical technology, medical products, electromedicine, laboratory technology and diagnostics. It is held annually in November in Düsseldorf, Germany. The fair was founded in 1969 as "Diagnostikwoche" in Karlsruhe and received its current name in 1974. Medica serves as a platform for the exchange of knowledge and the presentation of new technologies in the healthcare sector.

== History ==
=== Early years ===
Medica was launched in 1969 as the Diagnostics Week in Karlsruhe, Germany, with 135 exhibitors and 2,500 square meters of exhibition space. In 1972, the exhibition moved to Düsseldorf, where it has been held annually ever since. In 1974 the fair was renamed Medica. It was originally conceived as a trade event for a national audience, focusing on medical technology and diagnostic equipment.

=== Internationalization ===
In the 1980s, Medica began to attract more exhibitors and visitors from different countries. This development was supported by targeted marketing measures and the increasing internationalization of the medical technology industry. By the 1990s, Medica had established itself as a global trade fair. Today, more than 70% of the exhibitors come from abroad.

=== Profile update ===
Medica's profile has evolved in line with technological developments in the healthcare sector. Since the 1990s, the exhibition has included additional themes such as digital health, medical IT solutions and telemedicine. New event formats have also been introduced in response to digital advances.

=== Recent developments ===
More recently, topics such as artificial intelligence, robotics, telemedicine and sustainability have been increasingly integrated. At Medica 2017, for example, a smart plaster was presented that monitors the wound healing process and transmits it to a smartphone app. Devices such as 3D goggles for the operating room and headphones to combat depression were also presented. In 2023, more than 5,100 companies participated in Medica.

== Concept ==
=== Subjects and focus areas ===
Medica covers various subject areas, which are presented in different experience areas ("Erlebniswelten"), including laboratory technology and diagnostics, medical technology, electromedicine and consumables. In addition, technologies for physiotherapy and orthopedics are presented. Another area is dedicated to IT systems and digital solutions that address the ongoing digitalization of healthcare.

Specialist forums such as the Medica Innovation Forum provide a platform for exchanging views on the latest developments in medical information technology, including topics such as electronic patient records, IT security and data management. The forums include expert presentations, panel discussions and networking opportunities.

=== Exhibitors and visitors ===
Each year, Medica attracts professionals from various sectors of the healthcare industry, including medical technicians, IT specialists, physicians and hospital managers. Approximately 5,100 exhibitors from over 70 countries showcase their products and services. The exhibition attracts around 80,000 trade visitors, the majority of whom come from abroad.

=== Other portfolio ===
Compamed, a trade fair for medical technology suppliers, takes place at the same time as Medica. More than 700 exhibitors present their solutions for medical technology production, including components and manufacturing processes. In addition to the main events, Medica offers lectures, workshops and seminars on current topics. The exhibition agenda includes numerous program items, including specialized forums on specific aspects of the healthcare sector.

An annual competition for start-up companies is organized as part of Medica. Teams of developers present solutions for digitally networked healthcare.
