= AI Expo Taiwan =

Annual artificial intelligence exhibition in Taiwan

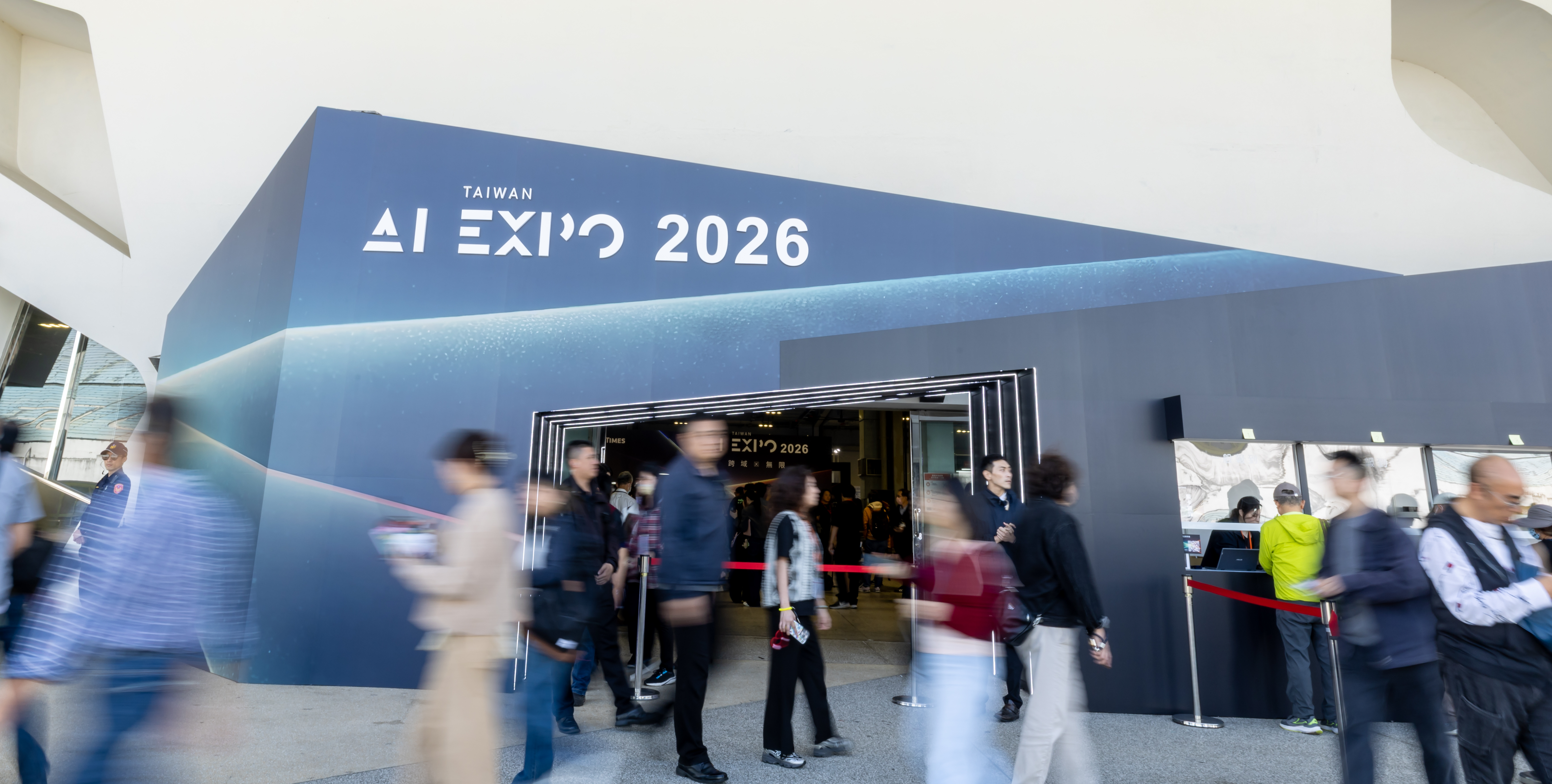
- Status: Active
- Genre: Trade Show
- Frequency: Annual
- Venue: Taipei Expo Park
- Country: Taiwan
- Inaugurated: May 4, 2022; 4 years ago
- Most recent: March 25, 2026; 7 months ago
- Next event: March 24, 2027; 4 months' time
- Organiser: DigiTimes
- Website: https://ai-expo.tw/exhibit.html

AI Expo Taiwan is an exhibition and seminar organized by DigiTimes. The show is held every spring at the Taipei Expo Park and it covers artificial intelligence applications in industries. First held in Taiwan on 4 May 2022, it is a major industry event in Taiwan alongside Semicon Taiwan. The exhibition reflects the Taiwanese government's "AI New Ten Major Construction Projects" strategy to transform the country into an "AI Island" by integrating AI into Taiwan's economy in collaboration with international companies like Alphabet Inc. and Nvidia.

== See also ==
- Semiconductor industry in Taiwan
- Economy of Taiwan
- Semicon Taiwan
