= Dhaka International Trade Fair =

Annual trade convention in Bangladesh

Dhaka International Trade Fair ঢাকা আন্তর্জাতিক বাণিজ্য মেলা
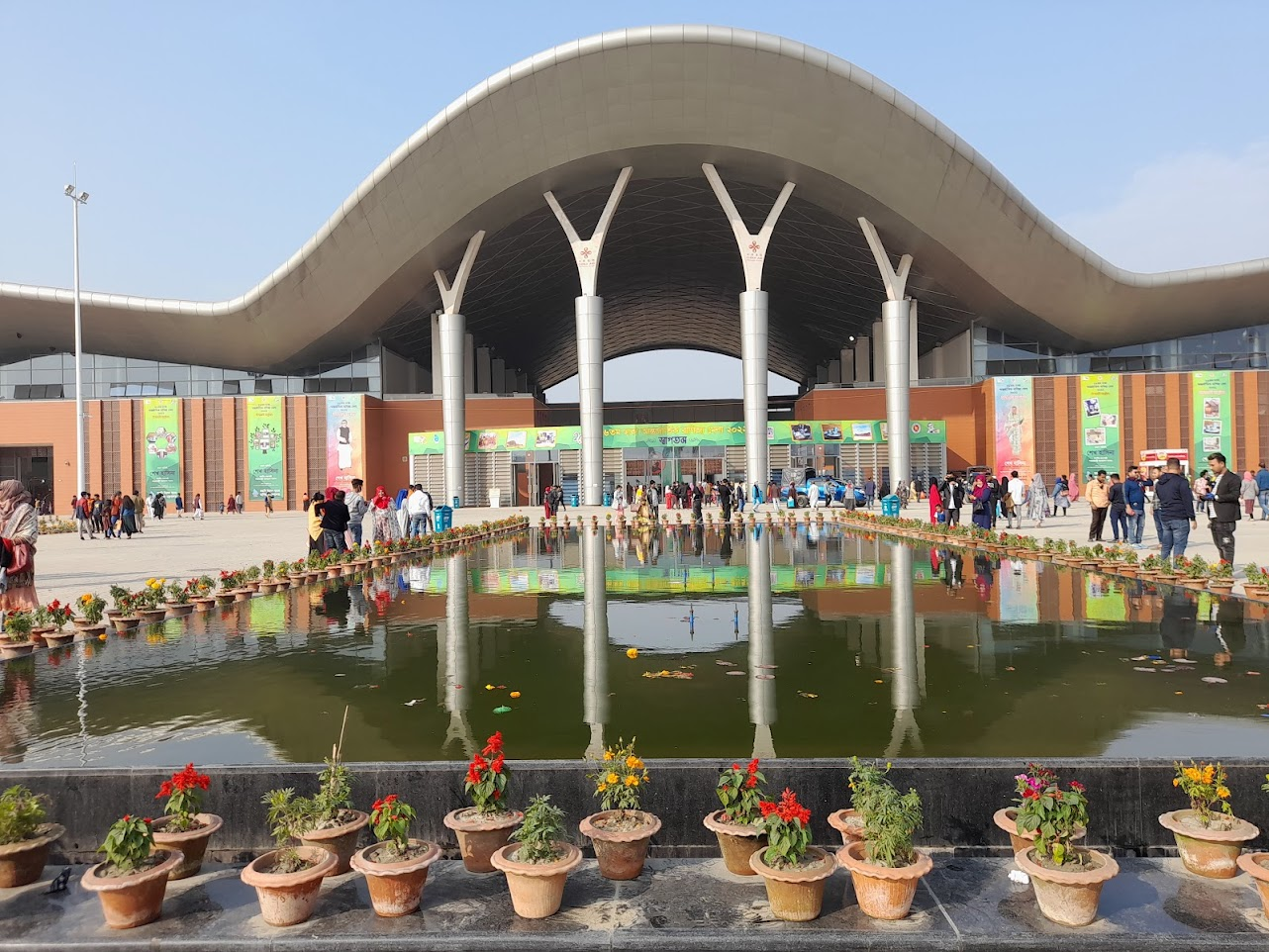
- Status: Active
- Genre: International Trade Fair
- Date: 1 month
- Begins: 1st Week of January
- Ends: 1st Week of February
- Frequency: Held Annually
- Venue: Sher-E-Bangla Nag9r (up to 2021).; Bangladesh–China Friendship Exhibition Center, Purbachal (From 1 January 2022).
- Location: Dhaka
- Country: Bangladesh
- Inaugurated: 1 December 1995
- Attendance: Hundreds of Thousands
- Organizer: Export Promotion Bureau and the Ministry of Commerce, Government of Bangladesh

Dhaka International Trade Fair (DITF) (Bengali: ঢাকা আন্তর্জাতিক বাণিজ্য মেলা) is an international trade fair held annually in Dhaka, Bangladesh. It is organised by the Export Promotion Bureau in collaboration with the Ministry of Commerce and the Ministry of Textiles and Jute of the Government of Bangladesh.

DITF takes place every year from the first week of January to the first week of February. From its inauguration in 1996 through 2021, the fair was held at Sher-E-Bangla Nagar in Dhaka, near the Bangabandhu International Conference Centre. As of January 2022, the fair has been permanently relocated to the Bangladesh–China Friendship Exhibition Center in Purbachal, a suburban area of Dhaka.

The fair features participation from both Bangladeshi companies and international businesses. A variety of local and foreign products are exhibited, including electronics, automobiles, porcelain ware, machinery, carpets, toys, ceramics, fabrics, melamine ware, sanitary products, handicrafts, ready-made garments, home appliances, processed foods, furniture, textiles, plastic goods, jute products, winter clothing, leather goods, cosmetics, sports goods, and jewelry.

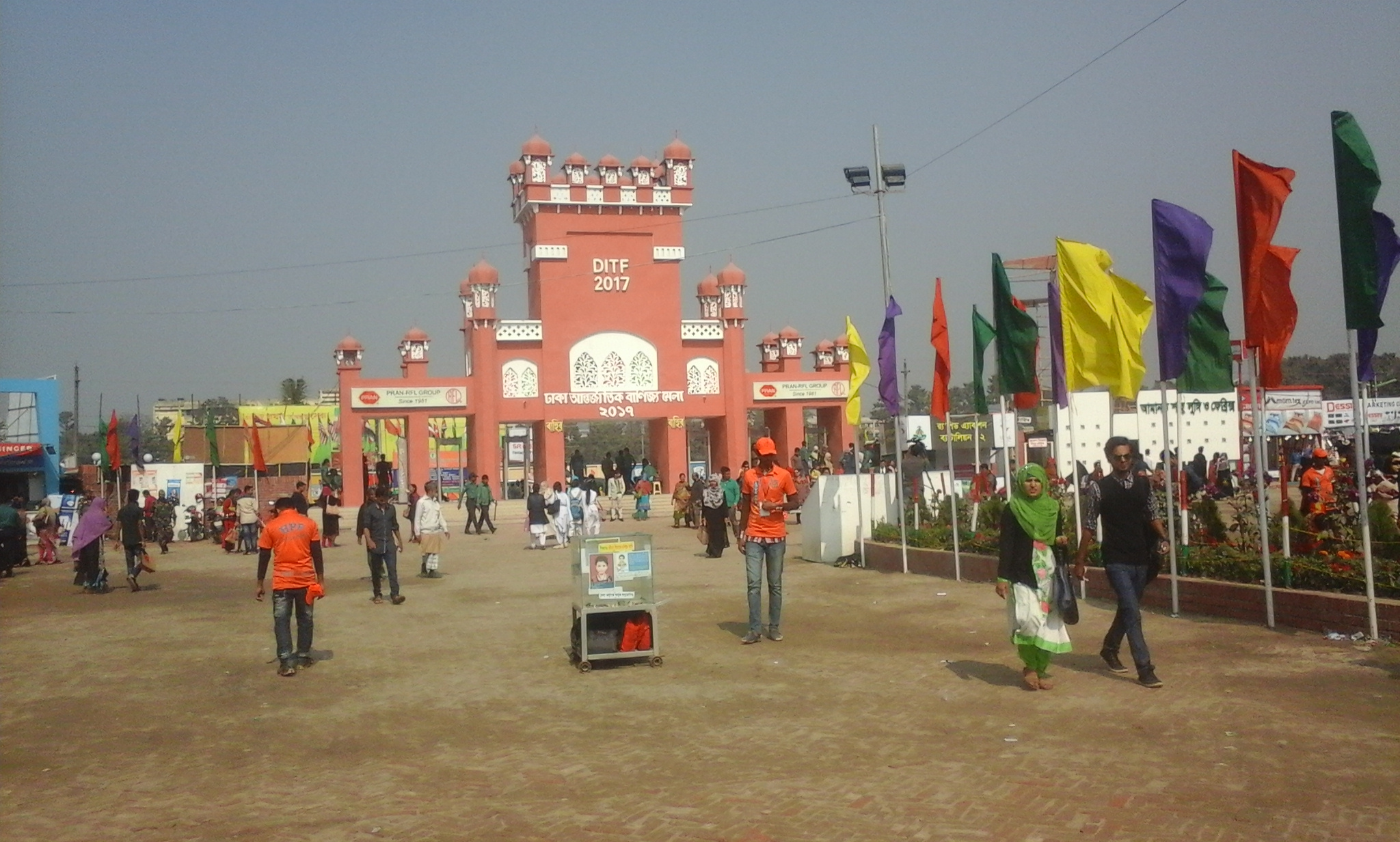
Dhaka International Trade Fair 2017 at Sher-E-Bangla Nagar.
