= Bangladesh–China Friendship Exhibition Center =

Exhibition Center in Bangladesh

- বাংলাদেশ–চীন মৈত্রী প্রদর্শনী কেন্দ্র

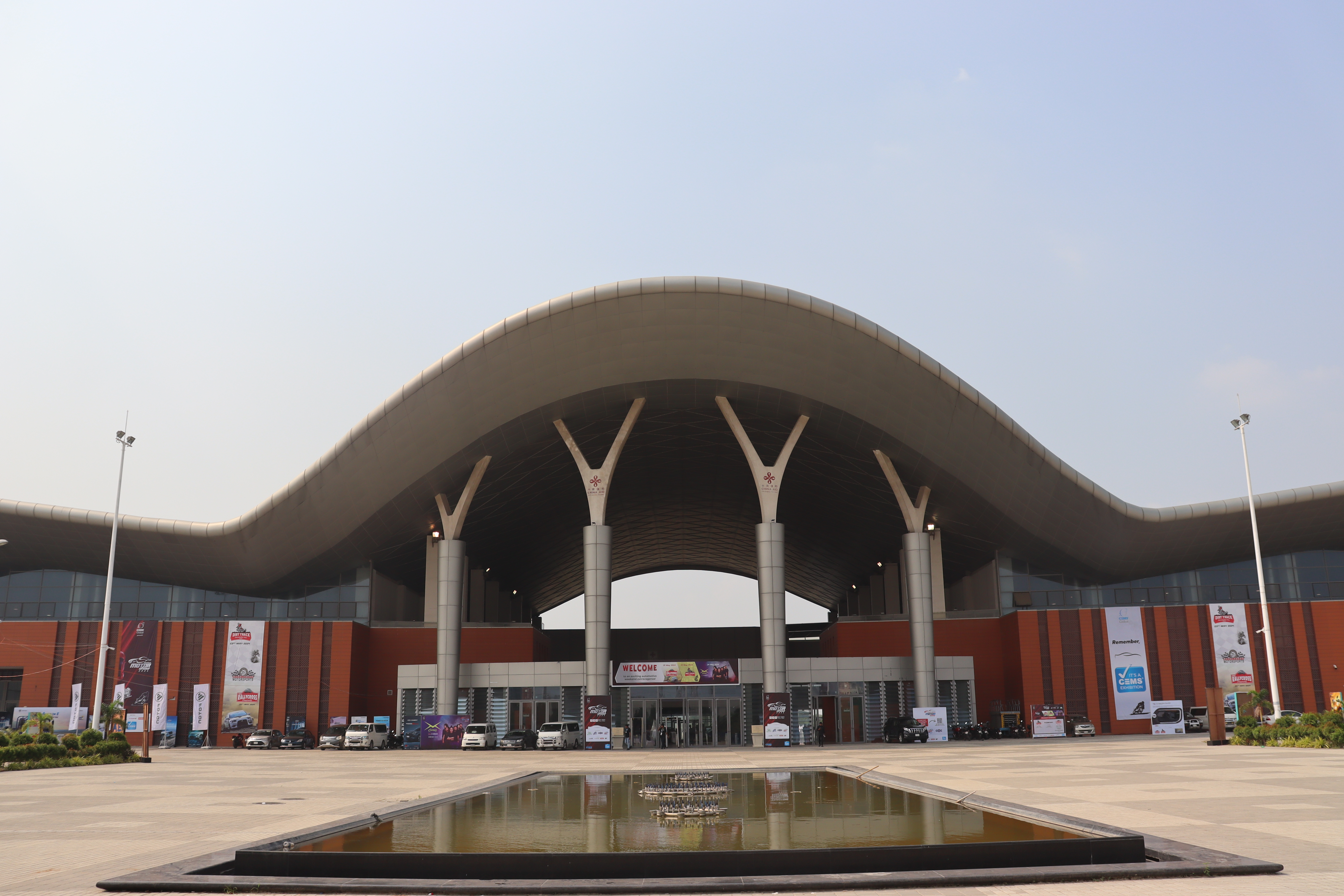
- Interactive map of the Bangladesh–China Friendship Exhibition Center area
- Former names: Bangabandhu Bangladesh–China Friendship Exhibition Center (2020–2024)

General information
- Status: Operational
- Type: Exhibition Facility
- Architectural style: Contemporary architecture
- Location: Dhaka Bypass Expressway, Sector 4, Purbachal, Dhaka, Bangladesh
- Coordinates: 23.8430319°N 90.5326441°E
- Construction started: 2017
- Completed: 2020
- Opened: 2021
- Cost: US$150 million

Technical details
- Floor count: 2
- Floor area: 33,000 m^{2} (355,200 sq ft)

Design and construction
- Architect: Beijing Institute of Architectural Design
- Engineer: China State Construction Engineering Corporation

Other information
- Parking: 500

Website
- https://bbcfec.gov.bd

Bangladesh–China Friendship Exhibition Center is an international product exhibition facility located in Dhaka. The facility has been set up in Purbachal near Dhaka metropolis. Sheikh Hasina inaugurated the installation on 21 October 2021. It is the venue of Dhaka International Trade Fair. It was decided to hold the trade fair here on 1 January 2022, and was held.

== History ==
In 2015, Bangladesh Export Promotion Bureau started its construction project. The project was undertaken with the aim of setting up an international quality product display center in the new city project area. Mohammad Rezaul Karim was the project director. 20 acres land situated in Purbachal was used to construct Bangabandhu Bangladesh–China Friendship Exhibition Center. The project was implemented by China State Construction Engineering Corporation. The purpose of building this exhibition center was to organizing export fairs, trade fairs, exporters' conferences, buyer-seller fairs and other trade promotion activities. Its construction work started by CSEC on 17 October 2017 and was completed on 30 November 2020, three years after construction started.

== Financing ==
This construction project was jointly funded by Bangladesh and China. It is known that the construction of the exhibition center costs Tk 1303.5 crore. The Chinese government gave 48% of the total budget.

== Specifications ==
The exhibition center with 33 thousand square meters floor space has an exhibition hall of 15,418 square meters. Added to this are a 473-seat auditorium, 50-seat conference room and 6 discussion rooms. Including 800 exhibition booths, it has other facilities such as built-in public address system, children's play area, guest room, medical booth, 500-seat restaurant, prayer room and 139 toilets. In addition to the automated central AC system, CCTV control room, fire extinguishing system, store room, in-built flag stand, own water treatment plant, this modern exhibition center has WiFi system.
