= Buyers Market of American Craft =

The American Made Show, (formerly known as the Buyers Market of American Craft) was the nation's largest wholesale trade show, providing US and Canadian professional studio artists a venue to build relationships with qualified retailers and wholesale craft buyers. Founded by Wendy Rosen, the show featured approximately 1,500 artists exhibiting to meet more than 9,000 buyers from 8,000 companies from across the United States and Canada. Held biannually, Buyers Market exhibitors realized more than $42 million in sales each year. The Buyers Market was twice named one of the 50 Fastest-Growing Trade Shows in America by Tradeshow Week magazine.

In October 2013, The Rosen Group announced that the Buyers Market of American Craft would be rebranded as the American Made Show. In 2015 the American Made Show moved from the Pennsylvania Convention Center in Philadelphia to the Walter E. Washington Convention Center in the nation's capital. The move to Washington, DC was made not only to heighten the pride of domestically produced goods but also to benefit both exhibitors and buyers. The Washington, DC location was more convenient for buyers from the Smithsonian museum stores, national association buyers, art consultants and institutional specifiers looking for domestic and custom art products.
