= Messe Düsseldorf =

Trade fair company based in Düsseldorf, Germany

Coordinates: 51°15′36″N 6°44′27″E

Messe Düsseldorf GmbH
- Type: GmbH
- Genre: Congress and trade fair organizer
- Founded: 1947
- Headquarters: Düsseldorf, Germany
- Key people: Wolfram N. Diener (President and chief executive officer); Stephan Keller (Chairman of the Supervisory Board)
- Revenue: €392 million (2024)
- Number of employees: 736 (2024)
- Website: messe-duesseldorf.com

Messe Düsseldorf GmbH is a German trade fair company based in Düsseldorf, North Rhine-Westphalia. The company operates one of the largest exhibition grounds in the world and is one of the leading international organizers of trade fairs. The trade fair company organizes numerous trade fairs and congresses in various sectors every year, including mechanical engineering, health and medical technology, lifestyle and beauty, leisure as well as trade, crafts and services.

Messe Düsseldorf was founded in 1947 and has expanded continuously since then. It is organized as a private corporation whose shareholders include the City of Düsseldorf, the State of North Rhine-Westphalia, the Düsseldorf Chamber of Industry and Commerce and the Düsseldorf Chamber of Crafts. In addition to operating the exhibition grounds in Düsseldorf, the company is also active worldwide and organizes international events and trade fairs. Well-known trade fairs organized by Messe Düsseldorf include Boot Düsseldorf, Medica, the K plastics trade fair, Drupa, Interpack and A+A.

== History ==
=== Early history ===
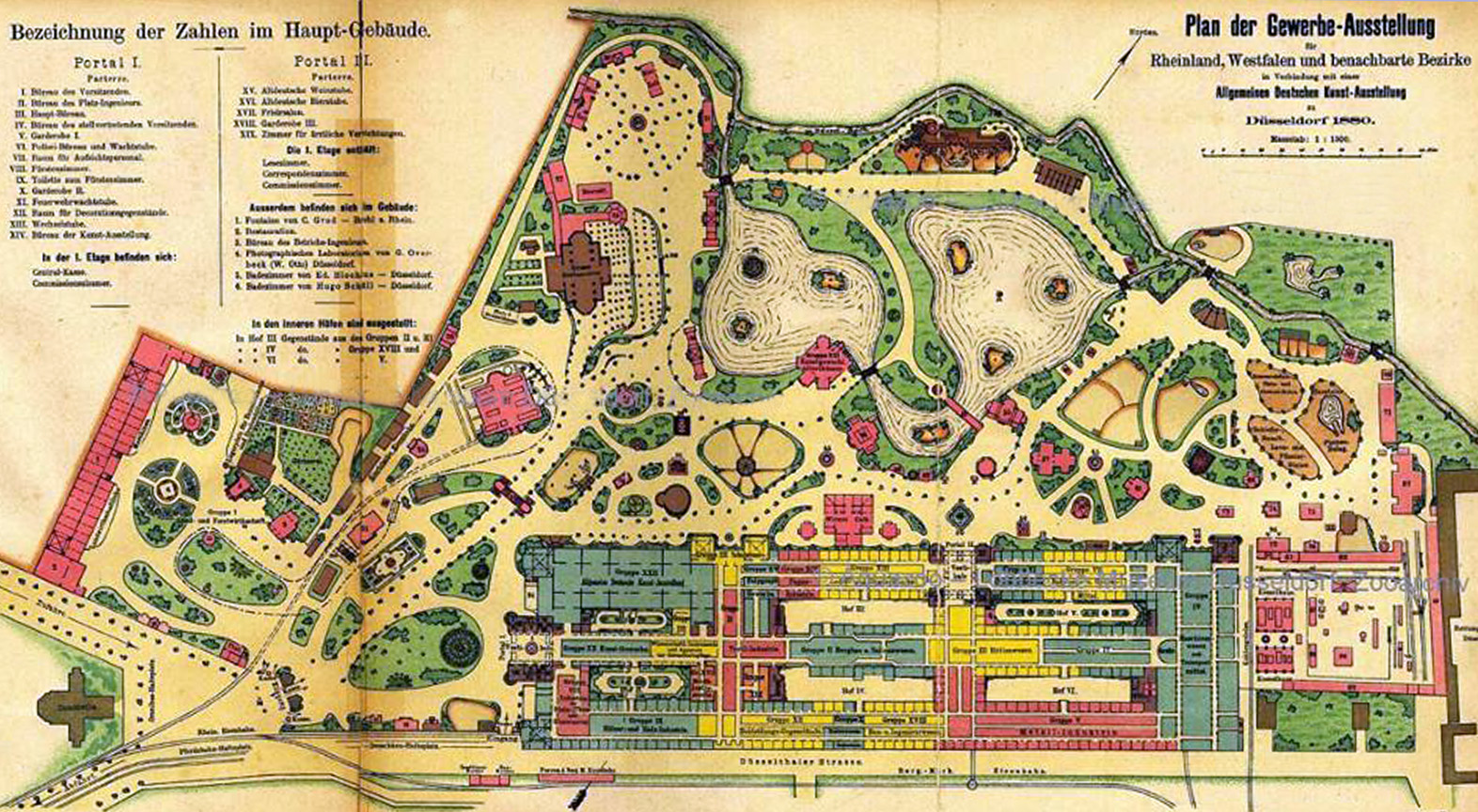
Plan for the Rhineland trade exhibition, 1880

Düsseldorf's history as a trade fair center begins in the early 19th century. The first milestone was the First Rhenish Trade Exhibition, which took place in 1811 under the patronage of Napoleon Bonaparte. The aim of this exhibition was to showcase the technical and industrial potential of the Rhenish region, which was under French administration at the time. It was a showcase of regional economic power and attracted great interest from both the population and local companies. The Rhine province and the Ruhr area subsequently developed into one of the leading centers of industrialization in Germany, and Düsseldorf took on a central role as a location for commercial and industrial presentations.

During the 19th century, Düsseldorf cemented its reputation as a trade and exhibition center. In particular, the Rhenish Exhibition for Industry and Trade, which opened in 1880, contributed significantly to the city's importance in the trade fair industry. This exhibition was organized by leading industrialists and trade representatives of the region and showcased a wide range of technical innovations and industrial products. It attracted both domestic and international visitors and marked a turning point in the city's development as a trade fair venue. Düsseldorf increasingly established itself as a platform for exchange between industry, trade and science, thus laying the foundation for the later development of trade fair activities in the 20th century.

=== 1900–1945 ===
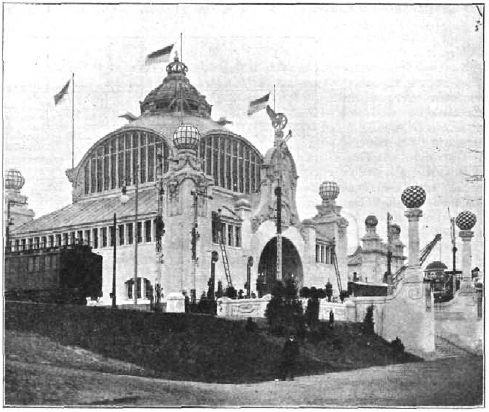
State Railway exhibition building for the 1902 Industrial and Commercial Exhibition

Building on the success of the previous exhibitions, in 1898, the associations of the Rhenish-Westphalian steel and iron industry and representatives of other sectors of the economy began preparations for the 1902 Industrial, Commercial and Art Exhibition. This major exhibition stretched from Golzheim to Ehrenhof and Hofgarten and enabled more than 2,500 exhibitors to present their goods and services. In particular, companies in the coal and steel industry from the Ruhr area, including Krupp, Hörder Bergwerks- und Hütten-Verein and Bochumer Verein, took part in the exhibition and built large halls for it.

The event cemented Düsseldorf's reputation as an important center for industry and trade, attracting both trade visitors and international guests. The 1912 municipal exhibition, which focused on modern companies and urban developments, also helped to strengthen Düsseldorf's position as an exhibition location. However, a further major exhibition planned for 1915 had to be cancelled due to the outbreak of World War I.

In the 1920s, during the Weimar Republic, Düsseldorf was once again the venue for a major event. The Great Exhibition for Health Care, Social Welfare and Physical Exercise (GeSoLei for short) took place in 1926 and attracted around 7.5 million visitors. This made it the largest trade fair in Germany at the time. The exhibition mainly focused on healthcare and on advances in the economy and urban development.

GeSoLei took place on a 400,000-square-meter site in the Pempelfort and Golzheim districts, where the Industrial, Commercial and Art Exhibition had already been held in 1902. Numerous buildings, such as the Tonhalle concert hall and the Ehrenhof courtyard, were built especially for this event and still shape Düsseldorf's cityscape today. GeSoLei was an important social event and contributed significantly to Düsseldorf's international reputation.

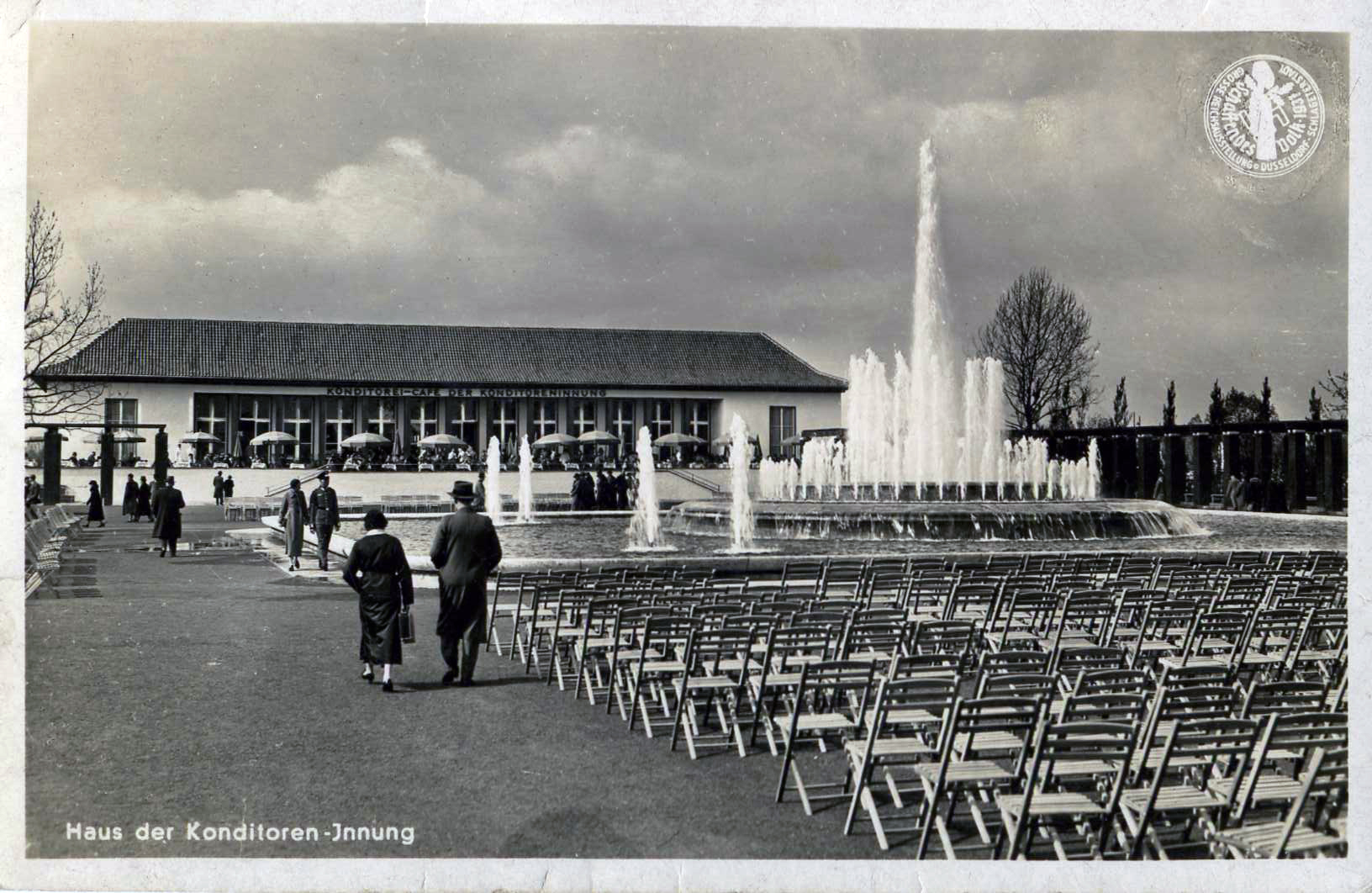
Reichsausstellung Schaffendes Volk, 1937

During the Nazi era, the Reich Exhibition Schaffendes Volk took place on the site of today's Nordpark in 1937. This exhibition was strongly influenced by Nazi propaganda and served to showcase the National Socialist world view and the supposed superiority of the German people. Düsseldorf was named "Destination of the Year 1937" to attract as many visitors as possible. Achievements in the fields of materials, industry and economy, spatial planning and urban development, as well as garden culture and art were shown. Numerous buildings, sculptures and green spaces were built especially for this event and can still be seen in the Nordpark today. The exhibition highlighted the close links between trade fair activities and political propaganda during the Third Reich.

=== 1945–1990 ===
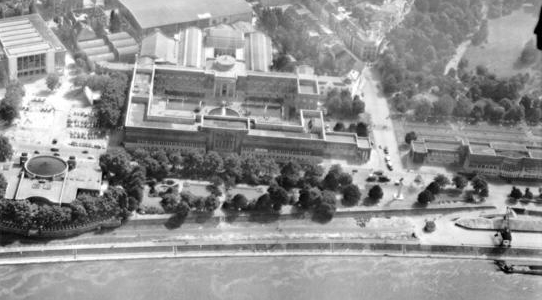
Ehrenhof aerial view, 1953

After the end of the World War II, the trade fair industry in Düsseldorf, like in many other cities, initially fell into disuse. Many exhibition buildings were destroyed or damaged, and the economic structures had to be rebuilt. In 1947, the operating company was finally established in its present form.

The first post-war exhibitions took place on the Golzheim site, which had already been used for trade fairs before the war. One of the first major events was the Export Fair in 1949, which helped West German industry to re-establish international contacts and promote economic recovery. This fair marked the beginning of Düsseldorf's rapid development into one of the most important trade fair locations in the Federal Republic of Germany.

During the 1950s and 1960s, Messe Düsseldorf expanded continuously. With the economic boom of the Federal Republic of Germany, the importance of international trade fairs increased, and the trade fair company strategically aligned itself to organize such events. As early as 1951, the K (plastics trade fair), one of the world's leading trade fairs for the plastics industry, was launched. In 1963, the first Boot Düsseldorf took place as an international trade fair for water sports and quickly developed into the largest boat show in the world. These trade fairs contributed significantly to Düsseldorf's international networking and profiling as a global trade fair center.

The 1970s and 1980s were marked by further expansion and specialization. In 1971, Messe Düsseldorf moved to a new site on the Rhine in Stockum, which was equipped with modern halls and a better infrastructure. From then on, numerous important trade fairs were held here, including Medica, which developed into the world's leading trade fair for medical technology.

=== Recent history ===
By 1990, Messe Düsseldorf had established itself as a leading international trade fair organizer, hosting events that attracted industry professionals from around the world and cementing Düsseldorf as a major trade fair destination. Following German reunification, the focus was increasingly on internationalization and expanding global business. The exhibition company expanded its portfolio abroad and established subsidiaries and joint ventures in key markets such as China, Russia, India and the United States. The number of international trade fairs increased, and Düsseldorf became a global hub for industrial exhibitions.

From 2000 to 2020, the exhibition center in Stockum was extensively modernized and expanded to meet the increasing demands for a modern infrastructure. In addition to the continuous development of established exhibitions, Messe Düsseldorf also introduced new formats aimed at specific industries. The service sector was also expanded so that exhibitors and visitors could benefit from customized solutions.

Between 2020 and 2022, the trade fair company, like the entire industry, had to face the challenges of digital transformation and the coronavirus pandemic. Digital trade fair formats and hybrid events gained in importance in order to serve international markets even under changed conditions. Messe Düsseldorf has been pushing ahead with its international expansion since 2023 in order to prepare for the future and continue to play a leading role in the global trade fair industry.

== Business activities ==
=== Legal structure ===
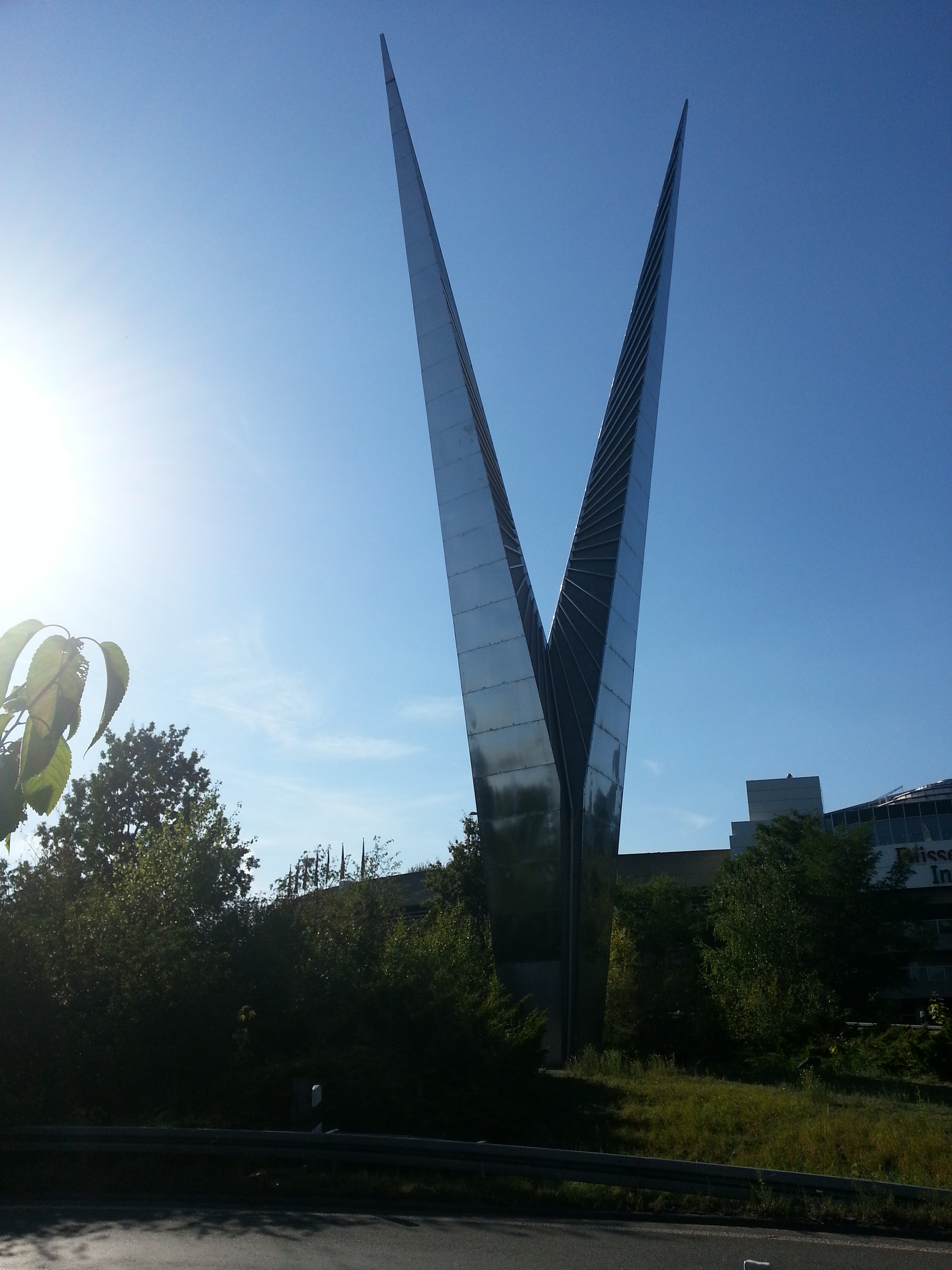
Pylon landmark at the entrance to the former Düsseldorf exhibition center, 2012

Messe Düsseldorf GmbH is a limited liability company (GmbH) based in Düsseldorf, North Rhine-Westphalia. The company was founded in 1947 and specializes in organizing and conducting trade fairs, congresses and events. Its business purpose includes the planning, execution and marketing of international trade fairs, particularly in the fields of mechanical engineering, health and medical technology, lifestyle and beauty, leisure, trade, skilled crafts and services.

To support its global activities, Messe Düsseldorf has seven subsidiaries abroad. These subsidiaries are active in strategically important markets and contribute to the international presence and growth of Messe Düsseldorf.

The shareholder structure of Messe Düsseldorf GmbH is mainly composed of the City of Düsseldorf, the State of North Rhine-Westphalia, the Düsseldorf Chamber of Industry and Commerce and the Düsseldorf Chamber of Trade. These shareholders play a decisive role in the orientation and strategic decisions of the trade fair company. The City of Düsseldorf has a significant stake, which gives it a direct influence on the development and operational decisions of Messe Düsseldorf.

The company is managed by three managing directors who are responsible for the operational management and strategic direction of the trade fair company: a chairman of the management board, a managing director operations and a managing director finance and infrastructure. The management is supervised by a supervisory board that represents the interests of the shareholders and monitors the business activities of Messe Düsseldorf. The supervisory board consists of representatives of the shareholders, local and state politics, as well as employee representatives of Messe Düsseldorf.

=== Core businesses ===
The core business of Messe Düsseldorf includes the planning, organization and marketing of trade fairs in various industries, such as mechanical engineering, health and medical technology, lifestyle and beauty, leisure, trade, crafts and services. The trade fair company aims to specialize and internationalize to meet the different needs of international markets. An important part of the business activity is the implementation of industry-leading trade fairs that serve as central platforms for trade visitors and exhibitors.

=== Important events ===
Messe Düsseldorf organizes around 25 trade fairs and 50 other events worldwide each year.

- Particular mention should be made of K, the triennial trade fair for the plastics and rubber industry, which is considered the leading international trade fair in its field.
- The Medica, the largest trade fair for medical technology, health and care, attracts trade visitors from all over the world and presents the latest developments in the medical industry.
- Another highlight is the Boot Düsseldorf, the largest water sports fair in the world, which has established itself as an important platform for innovations and trends in water sports.
- Every three years, Interpack, an international trade fair for packaging machines and packaging technologies, is one of the key events of Messe Düsseldorf.
- Every four years, Drupa brings together the world market leaders in the printing industry.

=== Services ===
In addition to organizing trade fairs, Messe Düsseldorf offers a wide range of additional services to support exhibitors and visitors in successfully staging their trade fair appearances. These include, in particular, technical services, such as stand construction and event technology. Other services include logistics and transport, marketing and communication, as well as exhibitor and visitor services, for example in the area of catering.

Preceded by Tarrant County Convention Center; Fort Worth	Davis Cup; Final Venue; 1993	Succeeded by Olympic Stadium; Moscow

Preceded by Suzhou International Expo Center; Suzhou	World Table Tennis Championships; Event Venue; 2017	Succeeded by SYMA Sports and Conference Centre; Budapest
