= DigiTimes =

Taiwanese daily newspaper

- Media, Marketing, Consulting.
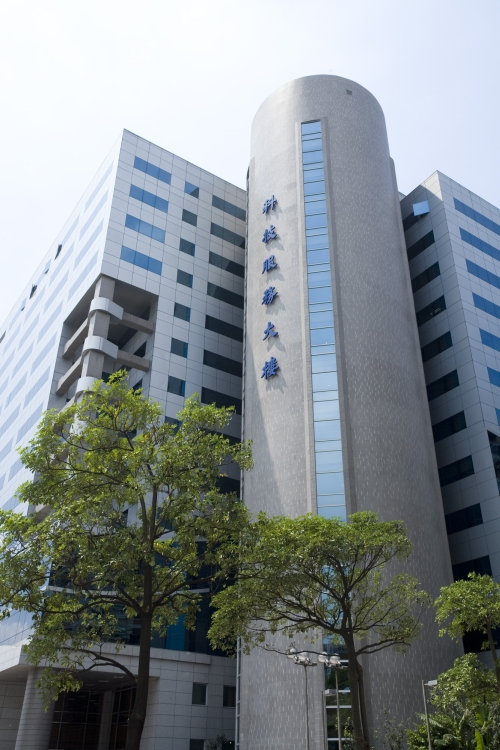
- Type: Daily newspaper (Mon–Fri)
- Format: on paper, online-website
- Founder: Key-people of Taiwanese IT-related industry
- Publisher: DIGITIMES Inc.
- President: Colley Hwang
- Founded: April 17, 1998; 28 years ago
- Language: Chinese (in print); Chinese, Taiwanese and English (online)
- Headquarters: Taipei, Taiwan
- City: Taipei
- Country: Taiwan
- OCLC number: 856752292
- Website: EN: www.digitimes.com; CH: www.digitimes.com/cn; TW: www.digitimes.com/tw

DigiTimes is a daily industry-newspaper published by DigiTimes Inc. from Taiwan. As one of the earliest publications dedicated exclusively to (computer-) technology within the Chinese-speaking domain, DigiTimes ranks alongside contemporaries like the Economic Daily News and the Commercial Times. It is comparable in technical focus to the renowned American EE Times magazine within the electronics industry published in the United States since 1972.

== History ==
The initial publisher of DigiTimes Inc. (Chinese: 大椽股份有限公司) was founded in January 1998 by Huang Chin-yung, former director of the Information Market Intelligence Centre (MIC) of the Institute for Information Industry (III), who raised NT$190 million from about 50 people.

The formation of DigiTimes Inc. itself as an independent publishing-company later on in April the same year, was thus enabled by influential figures within Taiwan's IT- and semiconductor-sectors, such as Stan Shih, the founder of Acer Group, Matthew F.C. Miau, the chairman of MiTAC Group, Kenneth Tai, the chairman of InveStar Capital Inc., Morris Chang, the founder and former CEO of TSMC, Hu Ding-Hua, the former Vice President of Industrial Technology Research Institute (ITRI), and Evans Tu, the Group President of SYNNEX, among others. Their collective involvement, alongside that of nearly 50 industry stakeholders, culminated in the establishment of DigiTimes Inc., with Colley Hwang, former CEO of ITRI's Market Intelligence Center (MIC), as CEO of DigiTimes Inc.

== Publication ==
The company launched its newsletter on April 17, 1998, providing Chinese-language content only. In 2000, it began to provide English-language news-services as well. In 2004 it began to provide industry-research reports, released a new version of its corporate identity system and moved its headquarters to its current location in 2007.

DigiTimes Inc. encompasses a daily printed newspaper in traditional Chinese, as well as Chinese and English websites. In 2021, the company rebranded its English website as DigiTimes Asia. DigiTimes further expanded its business scope by taking over IC Voice FM 97.5 Radio Station in 2022 and launched a documentary series called "Silicon Island. Spring and Autumn", documenting the development of Taiwan's semiconductor industry from the 1960s to the present. Under the umbrella of DigiTimes Inc., the brand includes DigiTimes, DigiTimes Asia, DigiTimes Research, and IC Broadcasting.

In Taiwan, the company claims to have over 1,300 member companies and offers various levels of membership, which allow members access to its news archive, preferential booking for events, and, for the higher levels of membership, access to DigiTimes Research reports.

DigiTimes also provides members subscription-based access to their Industry Research Database (IRD), a database of accumulated articles and crucial research-information on the technology-industry, especially with a focus of the Asian tech-industry. The company also offers material video and podcast media on given topics such as panel-discussions or crucial industry-related issues, with videos on the company's own platforms and YouTube, and audio-podcasts on the company's own platforms as well as on Apple Podcasts, Spotify, and Google Podcasts.

=== Market scope ===
Since its inception on April 17, 1998, by DigiTimes Inc., headquartered in Taipei, Taiwan, it has emerged as a source of information for the semiconductor, electronics, and communications sectors, along with the global Information and communications technology supply-chain, particularly focusing on Taiwan, Japan, South Korea, and China.

Its scope has expanded from Taiwan to include South Asia and Southeast Asia since 2016, in light of the emergence of the new trend of supply-chain diversification.

== Reception ==
DigiTimes has also been criticized for providing unreliable and untrustworthy reporting.

== See also ==
- Media in Taiwan
