= Semicon Taiwan =

Annual semiconductor exhibition in Taiwan

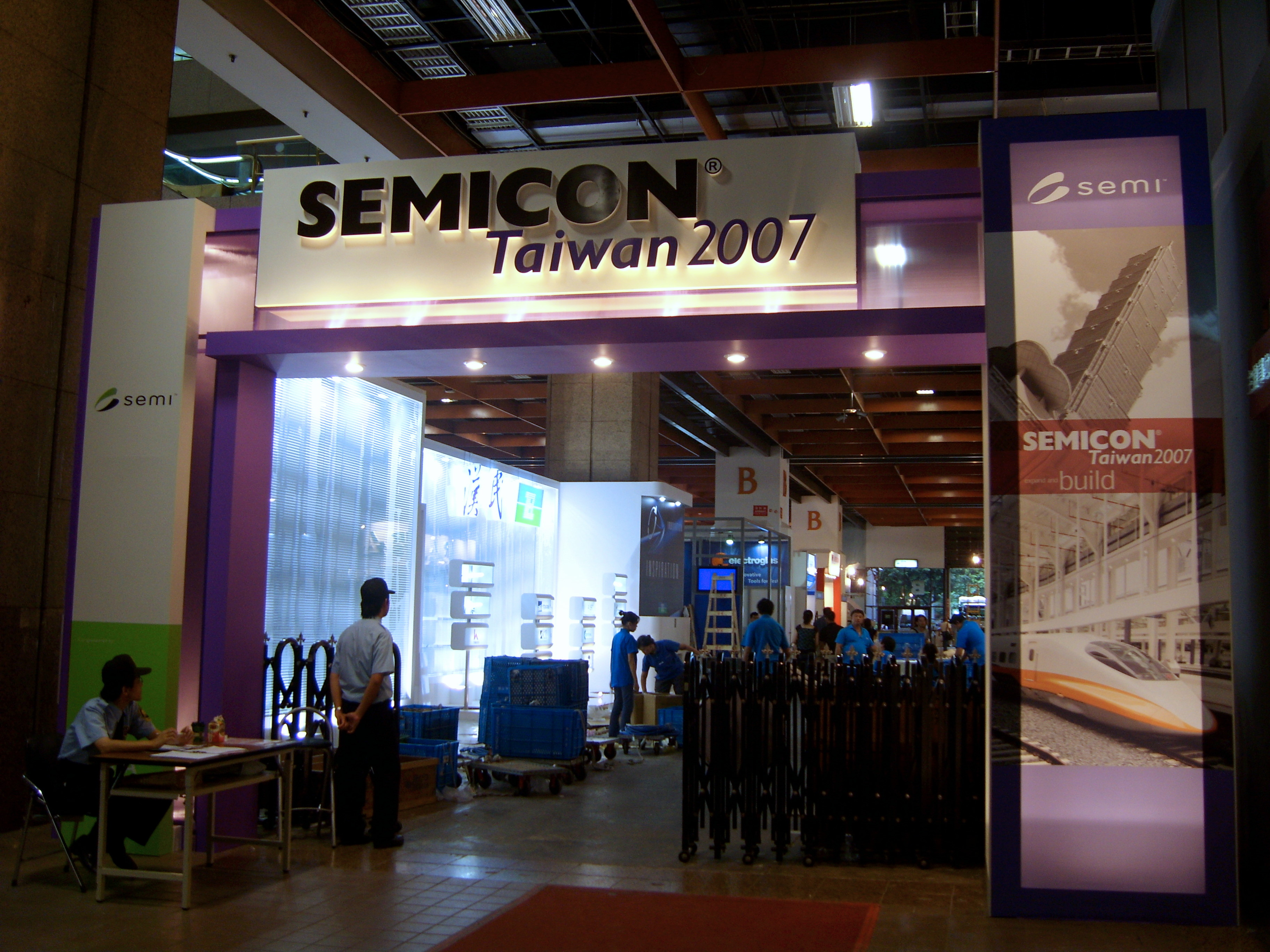
- Status: Active
- Genre: Trade Show
- Dates: September
- Frequency: Annual
- Venue: Taipei Nangang Exhibition Center
- Country: Taiwan
- Inaugurated: 1996; 30 years ago
- Most recent: September 10, 2025; 13 months ago
- Next event: August 31, 2026; 2 months ago
- Attendance: 100,000+
- Organiser: SEMI
- Website: https://www.semicontaiwan.org/en/

Semicon Taiwan, formerly known as Taipei International Semiconductor Show, is an exhibition and seminar organized by the Semiconductor Equipment and Materials International (SEMI) and co-organized by the Taiwan Semiconductor Industry Association (TSIA). The show is held every September at the Taipei Nangang Exhibition Center and it covers semiconductors, semiconductor device fabrication, microelectronics manufacturing, packaging, and testing technologies. First held in Taiwan in 1996, it is the largest semiconductor exhibition in Asia with an attendance of more than 100,000 people in 2025.

== See also ==
- Semiconductor industry in Taiwan
- AI Expo Taiwan
