= Export Promotion Bureau (Bangladesh) =

- রপ্তানি উন্নয়ন ব্যুরো

Agency overview
- Formed: 1975
- Headquarters: Dhaka, Bangladesh
- Parent department: Ministry of Commerce
- Website: epb.gov.bd

Export Promotion Bureau (EPB) is a statutory body of the Government of Bangladesh located within the Ministry of Commerce. It is responsible for promoting and developing the nation's export sector.

== History ==
It traces its origin to the Export Promotion organization formed when Bangladesh was still East Pakistan in 1962. Following initial proclamations made on 20 August and 8 November 1975, the EPB was made a semi-autonomous body through the Export Promotion Bureau Ordinance, 1977. Following political and legal changes, the more detailed Export Promotion Bureau Act, 2015 was enacted to replace the 1977 Ordinance.

== Structure ==
EPB is headquartered in Dhaka, with regional offices in Chittagong, Khulna and Rajshahi. In addition, there are branch offices in Sylhet, Comilla and Narayangonj.

The EPB consists of multiple divisions:

- Policy and Planning Division
- Commodities Development Division
- Information Division
- Fairs and Display Division
- Administration and Finance Division
- Textile Division
- Statistics and Research Division
- Information and Communications Technology Division
