= Hong Kong International Lighting Fair =

- Status: Active
- Genre: Lighting trade fair
- Venue: HKCEC
- Location: Wan Chai North
- Country: Hong Kong
- Inaugurated
- Attendance: 15,220 (spring); 33,319 (autumn)
- Organizer: HKTDC
- Website: spring edition; autumn edition

Hong Kong International Lighting Fair is a trade fair held twice-yearly in Hong Kong. The full title has the seasonal version appended, (Autumn Edition) or (Spring Edition). The autumnal version is the biggest lighting fair in Asia and the second largest in the world.

Organised by the Hong Kong Trade Development Council (HKTDC), it is held annually in October in Hong Kong, China, featuring over 1,700 international exhibitors and catering to the needs of buyers from around the world. Exhibits includes LED lighting, green lighting, household lighting, outdoor lighting, commercial lighting, lighting accessories, along with Hall of Aurora for branded lighting. The Spring edition is held annually in April.

== HKTDC Hong Kong International Lighting Fair (Spring Edition) ==
Also organised by the Hong Kong Trade Development Council (HKTDC), the HKTDC Hong Kong International Lighting Fair (Spring Edition) is held annually in April in Hong Kong, China, featuring a wide range of products including LED lighting, green lighting, commercial lighting, household lighting, outdoor lighting, lighting accessories. Running in tandem with the fair are HKTDC Hong Kong Electronics Fair (Spring Edition) and HKTDC International ICT Expo.

=== Major Exhibit Categories ===
Commercial Lighting, Crystal Lighting, Green Lighting, Holiday Lighting, Outdoor Lighting, Lighting Accessories & Components, Table Lamps, Household Lighting, LED Lighting, Lighting Management, Design & Technology, Trade Associations & Publications.

=== Concurrent Events ===
- HKTDC Hong Kong Electronics Fair (Spring Edition)
- HKTDC International ICT Expo
- HKTDC Hong Kong Electronics Fair (autumn)
- Hong Kong International Building and Decoration Materials & Hardware Fair (autumn)
- Eco Expo Asia - International Trade Fair on Environmental Protection (autumn)
- Sports Source Asia (autumn)

=== Trade Publications ===
A Lighting Magazine is published at each fair, featuring exhibitors as well as talking points within the lighting industry. The magazine, all in English, addressed a global lighting audience. In its efforts to expand beyond lighting industry alone, it also writes about new lighting applications such as plant-centric lighting from LuxBalance Lighting which help to "speed up plant growing process".
