= Hong Kong Electronic Industries Association =

Non-governmental trade body in Hong Kong

Hong Kong Electronic Industries Association (HKEIA) is a non-profit, non-government trade body of the Hong Kong electronics industry.

== History ==
The Hong Kong Electronic Industries Association (HKEIA) was established in 1980. In 2006, the group had almost 1,000 members, of whom 90% had collaborations with mainland Chinese firms through joint ventures and subsidiaries. HKEIA organises trips to Hebei and Guilin and arranges groups to take part in the World Electronics Forum (Chinese: 世界電子論壇) and TAITRONICS. China Economic Net said in 2006 that HKEIA is "extremely authoritative and influential in the Hong Kong electronics industry".

== HKEIA Awards ==
The HKEIA Awards are organized by the association and the Hong Kong Trade Development Council (HKTDC), organizer of Hong Kong Electronics Fair and electronicAsia. The HKEIA Awards are announced and presented during the Hong Kong Electronics Fair.

There are four award categories:

1. Consumer Electronics,
2. Personal Electronics,
3. Security Products and
4. Parts / Components
