= 2Spot Communications =

Thai character design company

2Spot Communications Co., Ltd.
- Headquarters: Bangkok, Thailand
- Key people: Kris Nalamlieng (CEO and Managing Director)
- Products: Fashion; Accessories; Gifts; Entertainment
- Website: www.2spotstudio.com

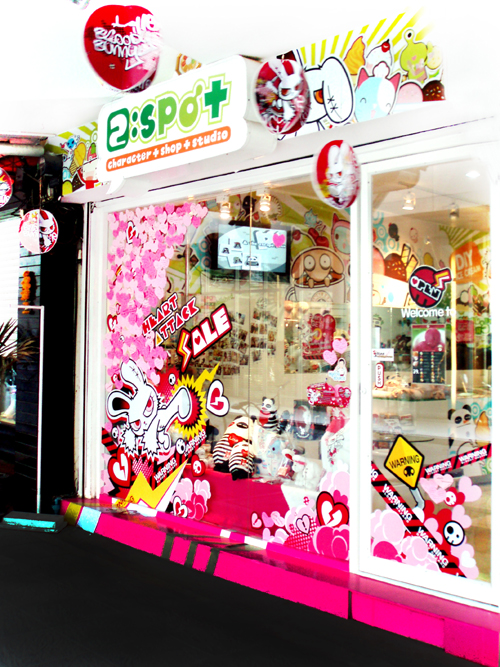
2Spot store at Siam Square in Bangkok, Thailand

2Spot Communications (also known as 2Spot Studio) is a character-design company based in Thailand. 2Spot was founded in 2004 and is the first character studio in Thailand that combines character design, licensing, mobile applications, merchandising, and retail. Kris Nalamlieng, son of former Siam Cement CEO Chumpol NaLamlieng, is the managing director of 2Spot. As of 2010, 2Spot has developed more than 20 characters sets, 1,000+ products, and 3,000+ digital content materials (i.e. mobile wallpapers and screensavers).

2Spot Communications has been featured on numerous television programs including Bangkok Post's PostScript and Thailand's Morning Talk TV.

In April 2012, it has a now-defunct mobile app named ShopSpot only available to Apple iOS. It is unknown when it was shut down.

== History ==
2005

- First release of 2Spot mobile products with Thailand's major mobile operators

2006

- Public opening at Thailand Animation Fair

2007

- Opening of 2Spot Shop at Siam Square in Bangkok
- Exhibit at Tokyo International Anime Fair
- Exhibit at Hong Kong International Licensing Show
- Exhibit at Hong Kong International Stationery Fair

2008

- Attendance at Hong Kong International Licensing Show
- Opening of 2Spot Shop at Central Rama 3
- Stationery product launch with 7-Eleven

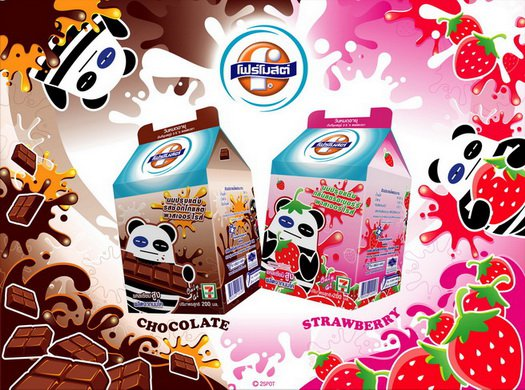
2Spot's P4 characters on 7-Eleven milk cartons

2009

- Launch of Bloody Bunny Foremost milk at 7-Eleven
- Release of Bloody Bunny, Biscuit and Unsleep Sheep applications for iPhone and Blackberry
- Awarded runner-up prize at SIPA Game Contest 2009 & SIPA Animation Contest 2009

2010

- Exhibit at Toy & Comic Expo Asia 2010 (Thailand)
- Exhibit at Singapore Toy Games & Comic Convention (STGCC) 2010
- Launch of P4 Panda Foremost milk at 7-Eleven Thailand

== Characters ==
2Spot has created over 200 characters,. The four most popular ones are Biscuit, Bloody Bunny, P4, and Unsleep Sheep.

2Spot offers a full line of service for licensing partners, including product design, sourcing, packaging design and short animation development. 2Spot is currently exporting digital and promotional licenses in Asia, Europe, and America.

2Spot clients include FlyCell (USA), Kaga Electronics (Japan), ACE Communications (France), Zoobe (Germany), Moffy (HK), and Sony Ericsson (Thailand).
