= ElectronicAsia =

Hong Kong trade fair

electronicAsia is a trade fair jointly organised by the Hong Kong Trade Development Council (HKTDC) and MMI Asia Pte Ltd.

The fair is a sourcing event for components, assemblies, electronics production and display technologies and to be held at the Hong Kong Convention and Exhibition Centre in October every year. Major highlights of the fair include: World of Display Technology, which presents the technology research, technical improvements and emergence of innovations in display technologies; and World of Solar, which covers a range of technologies, components, products and services in solar energy, photovoltaic and renewable energy equipment, engineering and technology in the search for alternative energy sources as well as a two-day conference.

== Related events ==
- International ICT Expo
- Hong Kong International Lighting Fair (Autumn)
- Hong Kong Electronics Fair (Autumn)
