= Hong Kong Houseware Fair =

The Hong Kong Houseware Fair is a trade fair organised by the Hong Kong Trade Development Council, held annually (usually in mid-April) at the downtown location of the Hong Kong Convention and Exhibition Centre. It is the largest fair of its kind in Asia and celebrates its 25th anniversary in 2010.

The fair's special highlights include Hall of Elegance, World of Pet Supplies, World of Fine Dining, Home Accents, Home Living, Outdoor Living and ASEAN Select.

In 2009, Bangladeshi exhibitors received $700,000 in orders through the fair. It incorporates elements of the discontinued HKTDC Summer Sourcing Show for Gifts, Houseware & Toys.

== Major exhibit categories ==
- Artificial Flowers
- Bar Accessories
- Bathroom Accessories
- Beauty & Fitness
- Candles & Scent Sensation
- Cleaning & Supplies
- Furniture
- Gardening & Outdoor Accessories
- Handicrafts
- Hardware & DIY Products
- Health & Personal Care Items
- Home Decorations
- Kitchenware & Gadgets
- Paintings & Objets d’Art
- Pet Supplies
- Silver Generation Products
- Small Electrical Appliances
- Tableware
- Trade Services

== Concurrent event ==
The fair will be held concurrently with the HKTDC Hong Kong International Home Textiles Fair at the Hong Kong Convention and Exhibition Centre.
