= Gender Benders =

Episode of Taboo

"Gender Benders" is the twelfth episode of Taboo's third season, which aired on October 18, 2004. It is the 36th episode to be broadcast.

== Female bodybuilding ==
=== 2003 Ms. Olympia ===
The segment begins in Las Vegas, Nevada, United States, at the 2003 Ms. Olympia. Six individuals comment on female bodybuilders, all expressing negative attitudes towards the muscularity of the women. Dr. William Leap commented that female bodybuilding challenges the social norms that women are delicate and docile.

==== Betty Pariso ====
Betty Pariso of Dallas, Texas, seen competing at the gym, has a goal of winning the Ms. Olympia competition. In her younger days, Betty saw herself as what she called a "stick". She spent 18 years building up her body. She felt bad about herself because she felt she was too thin, so she started lifting weights and felt power, strong, and gave her a lot of self-confidence.

==== Rosemary Jennings ====
In New York City, New York, Rosemary Jennings is also at the gym, readying herself for the 2003 Ms. Olympia. For three months, she has been working out two hours a day, six days a week. She has been taking vitamins and nutritional supplements. Her workouts burn most of the 1,500 calories she intakes daily.

==== Origins ====
The origins of female bodybuilding have their roots in the first strongwoman vaudeville acts, during America's first fitness craze of the 1890s. Posters billed Katie Sandwina as Europe's queen of strength, beauty, and dexterity. Despite her muscularity, she still held the classical shape of a woman.

==== Femininity ====
Modern female bodybuilders, with the help of modern training methods, dietary supplements, and, some insist, performance enhancing drugs, have achieved physiques not previously attainable. Some insist they look like men. As competitors began to look more masculine, support for the sport declined and the rules were changed to base judging on both masculinity and femininity of the competitors. Rosemary gets a beauty makeover from head to toe. According to Dr. Carolyn Marvin, bodybuilding for women is a sport where women can take on the characteristics of men, but underneath they are still women.

==== Weight classes ====
At the 2003 Ms. Olympia, the competitors gather from the weigh in. According to Betty, they have to resist taking in sugar, salts, and fats, along with cutting out water and other things on stage in order to obtain a certain look. The competition is divided into two divisions, lightweight or heavyweight. Rosemary is struggling to maintain a weight of 135 lbs or under in order to be within the lightweight division. Any weight above 135 lbs means she would have to compete as a heavyweight, which would give her a disadvantage against the heavyweight women bodybuilders. Betty, weighing in at 169.5 lbs, is a true heavyweight competitor. She has 3% body fat, but still maintains the same size clothes she wore before she started training, junior 5 or 7. In order to compete as a lightweight, Rosemary stopped eating or drinking. She comes up 133.5 lbs, the required weight to compete as a lightweight. Dr. Leap said that this eating pattern had parallels with anorexia and bulimia.

==== Steroids ====
Critics also claim that the use of performance enhancing drugs, such as steroids, is rampant in the sport. Four men commented that at the female professional bodybuilding level, steroids were needed in order to compete. Steroids build muscle and are similar to testosterone, with similar effects to testosterone. Women who use steroids often experience side of effects of facial hair growth, deeper voices, and male features.

Steroids also have negative effects on the body, damaging the liver and kidney. Like other athletes, female bodybuilders try to avoid the topic of steroids. Ondrea Gates, said the issue of steroid usage was a personal one and whether she was taking steroids or not was none of anyone's business. Betty denied that drugs were the only thing needed to compete and said it was only a small part needed to be a bodybuilder.

==== Discrimination ====
Despite all of their hard work, female bodybuilders are treated like second class citizens. The Mr. Olympia prize money totals $400,000, plus sponsorships for the winners, while the Ms. Olympia prize money totals only $50,000, and sponsors are hard to come by. The promoters see no double standards.

==== Backstage ====
Prior to the competition, the women prepare backstage. Ondrea says bodybuilding is like sculpting. At age 48, Betty is the oldest competitor in the lineup, but she is not the only woman in her 40s. Lenda Murray, the current female bodybuilding champion, says it feels great to stand out from other females. Denise Masino says female bodybuilders are looking for the feminine ideal, along with developed structures to their bodies.

==== Artificial breast implants ====
Many female bodybuilders have to get artificial breast implants. The reason for this is because breasts contain fat, and that fat is decreased because of extreme exercise and dieting.

==== Aftermath ====
-- Overall --
Lenda Murray
Place	Name	Country	1	2	3	4	Total
-- Heavyweights over 135 lbs --
1	Lenda Murray	(United States)	5	5	5	5	20
2	Iris Kyle	(United States)	11	10	10	10	41
3	Yaxeni Oriquen	(Venezuela)	14	15	15	15	59
4	Betty Viana	(Venezuela)	20	23	27	20	90
5	Helle Nielsen	(Denmark)	30	23	24	20	97
6	Betty Pariso	(United States)	28	30	28	20	106
7	Vickie Gates	(United States)	32	35	34	20	121
-- Lightweights up to 135 lbs --
1	Juliette Bergmann	(Netherlands)	5	13	7	9	34
2	Dayana Cadeau	(Canada)	16	7	9	6	38
3	Denise Masino	(United States)	16	12	14	14	56
4	Cathy Priest	(Canada)	15	20	20	20	75
5	Angela Debatin	(Brazil)	25	26	25	20	96
6	Fannie Barrios	(Venezuela)	30	31	32	20	113
7	Kim Harris	(United States)	35	39	36	20	130
7	Rosemary Jennings	(United States)	40	34	38	20	132

Lenda Muarry wins breaks the record and wins her eight overall Ms. Olympia title. All of the competitors took back medals. This was Rosemary's first Ms. Olympia she attended, while Betty had attended many Ms. Olympia's and planned on doing so many times more. At the gym, Betty is on the bar with 1,300 lbs. One commentator at the gym said he liked a woman with curves.

== Cast ==
- Lenda Murray
- Iris Kyle
- Betty Viana-Adkins
- Juliette Bergmann
- Fannie Barrios
- Betty Pariso
- Rosemary Jennings
- Yaxeni Oriquen-Garcia
- Ondrea Gates
- William Leap
- Dayana Cadeau
- Carolyn Marvin
- Colette Nelson
- Dave Palumbo
- Helle Trevino
- Denise Masino
- Kim Harris
