= Hong Kong Trade Development Council Trade Fairs =

The HKTDC Trade Fairs are a series of international trade fairs held annually and organised by the Hong Kong Trade Development Council held at the Hong Kong Convention and Exhibition Centre in Hong Kong.

== International Tea Fair ==
Its first edition was held August 2009 at the Hong Kong Convention and Exhibition Centre. The 2009 fair attracted over 250 exhibitors from 17 countries and regions, including mainland China, India, Sri Lanka and Taiwan. The fair is scheduled to coincide with the HKTDC Food Expo and International Conference & Exhibition of the Modernization of Chinese Medicine & Health Products in 2010.

== Education and Careers Expo ==
HKTDC Education & Careers Expo which started in 1990, is a platform organised by the Hong Kong Trade Development Council (HKTDC) which brings together bringing employers in contact with potential employees, and educators and professional bodies in contact with those looking to improve their skills and knowledge or to attain a professional qualification. The four-day-long fair is opened every year in the beginning of February at the Hong Kong Convention and Exhibition Centre.

The 2009 expo welcomed 514 exhibitors, including educational institutes – from outside as well as within Hong Kong – together with public and private sector employers. Participants came from far and wide, with exhibitors from 14 countries and regions: Australia, Canada, mainland China, France, Germany, Hong Kong, Italy, Macau, New Zealand, Singapore, Switzerland, Taiwan, the UK, and the US.

=== Major exhibit categories ===
Education

- Colleges & Polytechnics
- Universities
- School for Continue Education
- Vocational Training
- Language Schools
- Outside Hong Kong Educational Institutions

Careers

- Government Departments
- Semi-government Organizations
- Professional Associations
- Private Enterprises

Books, Stationery, Educational Supplies

- Book Publishers / Book Stores
- Learning Aids / Educational Equipment

== Baby Products Fair ==
The Hong Kong Baby Products Fair is an annual trade fair organised by the Hong Kong Trade Development Council (HKTDC), with its first edition scheduled for January 2010. It is a spin-off event from the HKTDC Hong Kong Toys & Games Fair, the second largest fair of its kind in the world and the biggest in Asia. The new Baby Products Fair will presents nearly 300 exhibitors and will feature group pavilions representing the mainland China, Taiwan and Thailand.

The fair coincides with the HKTDC Hong Kong Toys & Games Fair, Hong Kong International Stationery Fair and HKTDC Hong Kong International Licensing Show, which give a broader market overview and provide opportunities for buyers with specialist interests.

=== Range of exhibits ===
- Baby wear and footwear
- Strollers and gear
- Skincare and bath products
- Feeding and nursery products
- Bedding and furniture
- Baby toys and activities
- Gift sets
- Maternity products

== Hong Kong Toys and Games Fair ==
The HKTDC Hong Kong Toys & Games Fair is the largest toy industry event in Asia and the second largest in the world. Organised by the Hong Kong Trade Development Council (HKTDC), it is held annually in January in Hong Kong, China, featuring over 2,000 international exhibitors and catering to the needs of buyers from around the world. Exhibits include educational toys and games, hobby goods, magic items, outdoor and sporting items, paper products and toy packaging, video games, along with Brand Name Gallery for branded toys.

Peripheral activities include information events, such as seminars and the Product Demo and Launching Pad, as well as social networking occasions. The event is concurrent with the Hong Kong International Stationery Fair the HKTDC Hong Kong International Licensing Show and the HKTDC Hong Kong Baby Products Fair. This enlarges the scope for sourcing and presents more opportunities for productive business partnerships. It incorporates elements of the discontinued HKTDC Summer Sourcing Show for Gifts, Houseware & Toys.

=== Major exhibit categories ===
Candy Toys, Educational Toys & Games, Electronic & Remote Control Toys, Hobby Goods, Magic Items, Multiple Products/ General Merchandise, Outdoor & Sporting Items, Paper Products & Toy Packaging, Party Items, Toy Parts & Accessories, Soft Toys & Dolls, Vehicles, Mechanical Toys & Action Figures, Video Games

== Hong Kong International Stationery Fair ==
Co-organised by the Hong Kong Trade Development Council (HKTDC) and Messe Frankfurt (HK) Ltd., the Hong Kong International Stationery Fair is held annually in January in Hong Kong, China, offering a range of stationery and back-to-school items, including artist's supplies, children's stationery, office equipment, educational systems, gift stationery, writing instruments and many more.

The event is concurrent with the HKTDC Hong Kong Toys & Games Fair and the HKTDC Hong Kong International Licensing Show . This enlarges the scope for sourcing and presents more opportunities for productive business partnerships.

=== Major exhibit categories ===
Artist's Supplies, Children’ Stationery & School Supplies, Computer Peripherals & Related Accessories, Consumables for Office Equipment Gift Stationery, Office Equipment, Paper & Printing Products, Writing Equipment

== World Boutique ==
World Boutique, Hong Kong is organised by the Hong Kong Trade Development Council (HKTDC) and held concurrently with the Hong Kong Fashion Week at the Hong Kong Convention and Exhibition Centre in January every year. It showcases the latest branded fashion products, designers' collections, fashion accessories, home fashion, and lifestyle products and small gifts.

== Hong Kong International Medical and Healthcare Fair ==
The Hong Kong International Medical and Healthcare Fair is an annual fair that brings together firms and professionals in the areas of medical equipment and healthcare services.
