= World of Pet Supplies =

- Traditional Chinese: 寵物用品世界
- Simplified Chinese: 宠物用品世界
Transcriptions
Yue: Cantonese
- Jyutping: cung2 mat6 jung6 ban2 sai3 gaai3

The World of Pet Supplies (Chinese: 寵物用品世界) is an international pet fair organised by the Hong Kong Trade Development Council (HKTDC).

Wholesalers, importers, distributors and retailers that specialise in pet related products and services participate in the fair. The World of Pet Supplies takes place with the Hong Kong Houseware Fair at the Hong Kong Convention and Exhibition Centre (HKCEC). The number of exhibitors in the 2010 event increased to 106.

== Fair details ==
The World of Pet Supplies fair is held every year between the 20 and 23 April. The event in 2011 was the 26th fair, with more visitors and exhibitors expected than in the previous year, given the popularity that this event has gained. The largest fair of this type is held in Hong Kong, in the Hong Kong Convention and Exhibition Centre. Here, pet owners can get anything for their pets from dog wheels to accessories, grooming supplies, cages, aquarium supplies and everything needed in a house which accommodates pets.

Although the fair officially starts on the 20th of April, the afternoon of the day prior to the opening is reserved for the registration of the buyers. Everyone who wants to attend this fair must be registered and in most cases a pre-registration is required. The latter can be done via the official website of the fair. The three main days of the fair are the 20th, 21st and 22nd. The fair is then open from 9 am to 6:30 pm, and the buyers may register in the same days with 30 minutes before the fair starts or ends. The last day of the World of Pet Supplies fair is shorter and the event takes place only from 9 am to 5 pm.

The World of Pet Supplies is sponsored by different political bodies such as the Federation of Hong Kong Industries, Hong Kong General Chamber of Commerce, The Chinese General Chamber of Commerce, The Chinese Manufacturers' Association of Hong Kong, The Hong Kong Exporters' Association, The Indian Chamber of Commerce, Hong Kong and the Trade and Industry Department along with the HKSAR Government. The organizers of this event, the Hong Kong Trade Development Council is a statutory body that has been functioning since 1966. The HKTDC has the mission to promote trade within Hong Kong by encouraging the financial activity of the small and medium-sized enterprises. The aim of the corporation is to support the manufacturers, traders and service providers whose businesses are based in Hong Kong. Of its 40 international offices, 11 are situated in mainland China. By organizing this type of trade event, the HKTDC is aiming to promote Hong Kong as a platform for doing business with China and throughout Asia.

According to the Society for the Voluntary Control of Fair and Exhibition Statistics (FKM) more than 2,000 exhibitors have been present at this fair and the event managed to attract over 25,000 visitors and potential buyers. According to FKM, the majority of visitors came from Asia (approximately 52%) and Europe (18%) followed by America (13%). As expected, most of the exhibitors present at the fair up until now have been from Hong Kong and mainland China (1,356 out of a total of 2,149).

In order to be eligible for admission, visitors must be older than 18. Exhibitors on the other hand must comply with more complex criteria. Firstly, exhibitors that wish to participate at this fair must be legally registered companies/businesses carrying on business either in Hong Kong or in their country of origin in accordance with applicable laws. In order to prove so, exhibitors are likely to be asked for their latest registration certificate or other documents that can provide proof of a bona fide business. There is also a fee that must be paid by every exhibitor and which depends on the type of booth the exhibitor wants to use. The smallest fee is of $4,680 for a standard booth of 9 m2. Exhibitors who need wide spaces to display their products may get a raw space of at least 27 m2, for $455/m2.

World of Pet Supplies is the special highlight of the HKTDC Hong Kong Houseware Fair and is held at the same time as the HKTDC Hong Kong International Home Textiles Fair. The zones of the fair are themed and there is a Hall of Elegance with products intended for designer collections and brand names, ASEAN which is a group of pavilions from countries belonging to the Association of Southeast Asian Nations and World of Fine Dining which includes bar accessories, kitchenware and tableware of high quality. The World of Pet Supplies is the fair designed for selling and buying products that are pet related.

The World of Pet Supplies fair was created in response to strong market demand, and features items from basic to luxurious in the categories of pet-related products and services, aquatic products and veterinary products. In 2010, the main exhibitors that displayed their products at this fair were Ankur Exports, Brilliant Champ Consultants Co., Ltd., Doggie Goodie Ltd, Pro Driven Company Limited, Sealand Holdings Co Ltd, Zhejiang Pujiang Jiantai Textile Co., Ltd., Lilaiden Industrial Co., Ltd., Saito Japan Co Ltd, Tolam Pet Products Company Limited, Petbitat International Ltd, Petzmart International Limited, Qiaotai Leather (Shenzhen) Co., Ltd. and Caliber Multimedia Technology Trading & Co., Ltd.
