= International ICT Expo =

International ICT Expo is organised by the Hong Kong Trade Development Council (HKTDC) and is held at the Hong Kong Convention and Exhibition Centre in April every year.

The Expo includes the following product and service zones: Enterprise Solutions; Computer & Peripherals; Telecom, Networking & Wireless Technologies; IT Outsourcing; Digitainment & Multimedia; e-Logistics & Retail Technologies; Home-grown Innovations; and Trade Related Services.

== Related events ==
- [Hong Kong Electronics Fair (Spring Edition)]https://web.archive.org/web/20100119132936/http://hkelectronicsfairse.com/index.htm
- [Hong Kong Int'l Lighting Fair (Spring Edition)]http://hklightingfairse.hktdc.com/
- [Hong Kong Electronics Fair (Autumn Edition)]http://hkelectronicsfairae.hktdc.com/
- electronicAsia https://web.archive.org/web/20100217063349/http://electronicasia.hktdc.com/index.htm
