= Wan Chai Temporary Promenade =

Promenade in Hong Kong

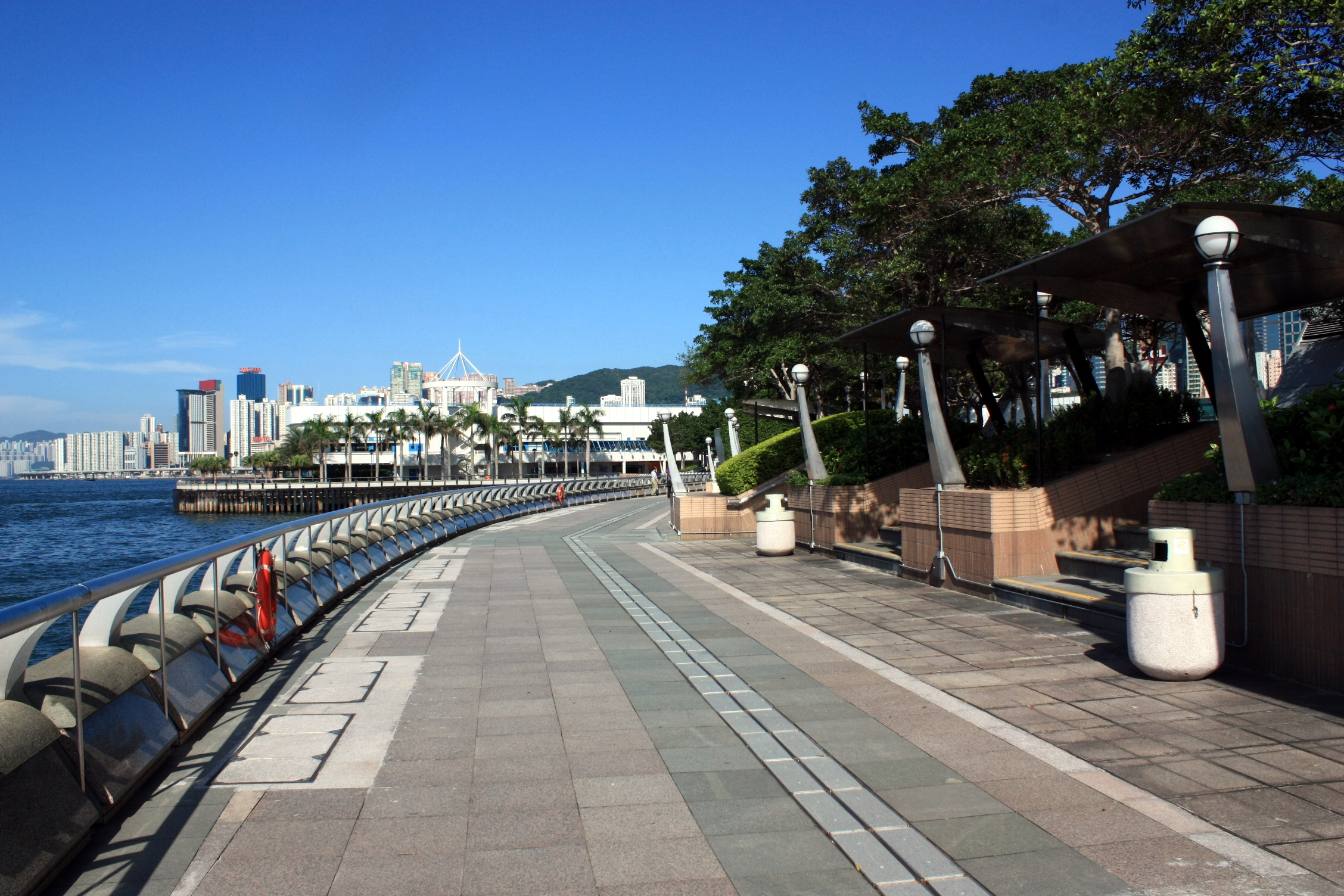
- The promenade in 2009
- Interactive map of Wan Chai Temporary Promenade

The Wan Chai Temporary Promenade (Chinese: 灣仔臨時海濱花園) is a promenade along the Hong Kong Convention and Exhibition Centre in Wan Chai, Hong Kong.
