= Hong Kong International Printing and Packaging Fair =

International trade show in Hong Kong

Hong Kong International Printing and Packaging Fair is an international trade show organised by the Hong Kong Trade Development Council and CIEC Exhibition Company (HK) Limited, held annually (usually in April) at the AsiaWorld-Expo, Hong Kong. The fair brings together suppliers from mainland China, Hong Kong, Taiwan and Asia Pacific region under one roof top. Their products and services include book printing, business printing, digital printing, gift packaging, food packaging, cosmetics packaging and medicine packaging. Suppliers and manufacturers offer products and services for trade buyers from around the world. Industry analysts noted that the fair contributed to the rise of prominent new players in the printing sector.

In 2009, the fair attracted 11,324 buyers from 108 countries and regions, 60% of whom were from overseas. The fair coincides with a peak sourcing season in Hong Kong and Guangdong, bringing thousands more buyers to the region. The world’s largest gifts fair, HKTDC Hong Kong Gifts & Premium Fair, and a large-scale well-established trade fair in Guangzhou took place at the same time.

The 20th edition of the fair was held from April 27–30, 2025, at AsiaWorld-Expo, Hong Kong.Organized by the Hong Kong Trade Development Council (HKTDC). It Featured around 360 exhibitors from across the region.
