= Hong Kong International Medical and Healthcare Fair =

The Hong Kong International Medical and Healthcare Fair (traditional Chinese: 香港國際醫療及保健展; simplified Chinese: 香港国际医疗及保健展), previously known as the Hong Kong International Medical Devices and Supplies Fair (traditional Chinese: 香港國際醫療器材及用品展; simplified Chinese: 香港国际医疗器材及用品展), is a trade fair organised by the Hong Kong Trade Development Council, held annually at the Hong Kong Convention and Exhibition Centre. The 2009 fair attracted over 150 exhibitors from 12 countries and regions. Several themed zones which include Medical Device, Medical Supplies and Disposables, and Tech Exchange help buyers connect with the right suppliers.

Over 20,000 people attended the 2016 fair. The 2025 fair drew roughly 300 exhibitors from 13 countries and regions. The fair had three themes that year: the newest medical technologies, elder care technology, and eco-friendly options.

== Major exhibit categories ==
- Accident and Emergency Equipment
- Building Technology and Hospital Furniture
- Chinese Medical Devices
- Communication, Systems and Information Technology
- Dental Equipment and Supplies
- Diagnostics
- Electromedical Equipment / Medical Technology
- Laboratory Equipment
- Medical Components and Materials
- Medical Supplies and Disposables
- Physiotherapy / Orthopaedic / Rehabilitation Technology
- Textiles
