= Hong Kong Fashion Week for Fall/Winter =

Annual fashion trade event

Hong Kong Fashion Week for Fall/Winter is the second largest fair of its kind in the world, and the largest in Asia organized by the Hong Kong Trade Development Council (HKTDC). It is held at the Hong Kong Convention and Exhibition Centre in January every year. The fair has been drawing buyers in big numbers for more than 40 years.

In 2009, the fair featured over 1,400 exhibitors from 23 countries and regions, offering strong connections for great business opportunities and deals. It is organized by product sector to give buyers easy access to the products that suit their business, highlights include: Intimate Wear Zone, World of Fashion Accessories, Emporium de Mode, Infant & Children's Wear, Bridal & Evening Wear, Garment Mart, Fashion Gallery, Fabrics & Yarn as well as Sewing Supplies.

Hong Kong Fashion Week for Fall/Winter 2018, attracted some 1400 exhibitors from 13 countries and regions, was held from 15 to 18 January 2018.
