= Hong Kong Optical Fair =

Hong Kong trade fair for optical products

The HKTDC Hong Kong Optical Fair is an Asian trade convention for optical products, organised by the Hong Kong Trade Development Council (HKTDC) and held annually in the Hong Kong Convention and Exhibition Centre.

The 2009 the fair attracted 535 exhibitors from 23 countries and regions, including group pavilions from mainland China, Germany, Italy, Japan, Korea, Singapore and Taiwan. Themed zones include Brand Name Gallery - stylish zone exclusively for brand name collections of eyewear; Retail & Shop Design, Equipment and Technology Section – features furniture, fittings and lighting, point-of-sale equipment and technology which are designed for effective retailing.
