= Patrick Lin =

Patrick Lin may refer to:

- Patrick Lin (chef)
- Patrick Lin (cinematographer)

== See also ==
- Patrick Lynn (born 1965), American professional bodybuilder
