= Hong Kong International Wine & Spirits Fair =

The Hong Kong International Wine & Spirits Fair is a trade fair organised by the Hong Kong Trade Development Council (HKTDC), scheduled to be held annually with its inaugural event held in 2008 at the central location in Hong Kong of the Hong Kong Convention and Exhibition Centre.

The next fair is in 2012 HKTDC Hong Kong International Wine & Spirits Fair 2012 8–10 November at the Hong Kong Convention and Exhibition Centre

== Overview ==
The 2009 fair attracted over 520 exhibitors from 34 countries and regions, including Argentina, Australia, Chile, mainland China, Hungary, India, Italy, Japan, Korea, Moldova, New Zealand, Philippines, Portugal, Slovenia, South Africa, Spain, Thailand, the United States and Uruguay.

Following the removal of wine duty in 2008, Hong Kong became the only major economy in the world to impose no duty and no sales tax on wine.
