= HKTDC Education & Careers Expo =

HKTDC Education & Careers Expo is a platform organized by the Hong Kong Trade Development Council (HKTDC) which brings together bringing employers in contact with potential employees, and educators and professional bodies in contact with those looking to improve their skills and knowledge or to attain a professional qualification. The four-day-long fair is opened every year in the beginning of February at the Hong Kong Convention and Exhibition Centre. In 2021, the event is postponed to take place in July.

The 2009 expo welcomed 514 exhibitors, including educational institutes – from outside as well as within Hong Kong – together with public and private sector employers. Participants came from far and wide, with exhibitors from 14 countries and regions: Australia, Canada, mainland China, France, Germany, Hong Kong, Italy, Macau, New Zealand, Singapore, Switzerland, Taiwan, the UK and the US.
