= Hong Kong Food Festival =

Annual event in Hong Kong

The Hong Kong Food Festival (Chinese: 香港冬日美食節) is a food festival organised by the Hong Kong Asia Exhibition (Holdings) Limited. It is held annually (usually in December around Christmas) at the Hong Kong Convention and Exhibition Centre, selling and promoting a variety kinds of food, drinks, snacks and many more. There are different zones for various kind of customers.

== History ==
The first Hong Kong Food Festival was organized in 2003, when Hong Kong was suffering under the effect of the severe acute respiratory syndrome (SARS) epidemic. Due to the epidemic, people's willingness to buy decreased and the local market was suffering. To stimulate consumption, the organizer, Hong Kong Asia Exhibition (Holdings) Ltd organized both the Hong Kong Food Festival and Hong Kong Mega Showcase in December, near Christmas. By holding both exhibition near the holidays, the organizer aimed not only to encourage local consumption and stimulate the economy, but also to bring the joy of holidays to Hong Kong through a carnival style exhibition, so as to revitalize the atmosphere in Hong Kong at that time.

== Theme and past trends ==
The first exhibition was a success and thus it kept the theme of “carnival” for all the later years. It was promoted as a food carnival of celebration towards the upcoming Christmas with happiness and satisfaction.

Over the course of 12 years there has been significant increase in number of visitors, including foreign visitors. According to statistics from the 2014 Hong Kong Food Festival, the total visitors over the period of 5 days reached 1.21 million people, accounting to a 15% increase comparing to the year 2013. While among all visitors, 83.7% of the visitor are 2.8% are from South East Asia, 3.6% are from European and American Countries and 1.7% from other Asia countries. Most participants are families as recorded, with 52% of them among all visitors. The other half consist of students, couple and trade buyers with similar percentages.

== Activities ==
Hong Kong Food Festival provides a large variety of activities related to food for the participants. It includes large scale cuisine exhibitions and cookery demonstrations. There are booths on different types of food and beverage, like dessert, vegetarian food as well as wine. Visitors can purchase luxurious food and seafood such as oysters, lobsters and abalones at a low price. In order to enhance the people's’ incentive of purchasing, exhibitors offer discounts and special activities. For instance, at the 12th Hong Kong Food Festival, special activities like free bubble-like fusion ice cream for the first 100 visitors, and using extremely low price ($1) to buy a brown crab were arranged. In addition, the organizer invites celebrities such as renowned chefs and artists as the special guests of the Star Kitchen. They share culinary tips to the audiences and some of them also introduce some unusual cuisines, like homemade Japanese pancake Okonomiyaki, and vegetarian meals. Professionals are also invited to give talks on the topics related. As people are more concerned about their health, speeches on regimen and health are delivered. Apart from Star Kitchen, workshops are also organized. It delivers an opportunity for the participants to make cuisine and beverage by themselves. For example, there were DIY workshops on beer brewing, latte art, baking cookies and making cocktails.

=== Theme zones ===
There are in total of 10 theme zones in Hong Kong Food Festival 2015, which include Premium brands Zone, South East Asia Favour Zone, Healthy Green and Vegetarian Food Zone, New Year Food, Daily Essentials & Quality Dried Seafood Zone, Taste of Korea, Staple Diet of Japan and Worldwide Food & Trading Zone. Luxe Culinary Pavilion, International Wine and Deluxe Ingredient Zone and Party Food & Sweet Pavilion are the five brand new theme zones this year.

== Related events ==
Apart from the Hong Kong Food Festival, there are a lot of dining events throughout the year. For instance, the Hong Kong Wine and Dine Festival provides a chance for visitors to enjoy high-end wines and food. The Hong Kong Food Expo lets visitors taste different cuisines from the East to the West. Also, there are in total of two beer festivals in Hong Kong each year, which are the Lan Kwai Fong Music and Beer Fest and German Bierfest. Hong Kong citizens and oversea visitors can enjoy good beer and German food in these two festivals.
