= Taboo (2002 TV series) =

- Title card
- Also known as: Culture Shocks
- Country of origin: United States
- Original language: English

Production
- Producer: Morris Abraham
- Running time: 60 minutes (with commercials)
- Production company: Beyond

Original release
- Network: National Geographic Channel
- Release: September 30, 2002 – December 5, 2014

Taboo is a documentary television series that premiered in 2002 on the National Geographic Channel. The program is an educational look into controversial rituals and traditions practiced openly in some societies, while forbidden and/or illegal as a "taboo" in others.

Each hour-long episode details a specific topic, such as marriage or initiation rituals, and explores how such topics are viewed throughout the world. Taboo generally focuses on the most misunderstood, despised, or disagreed-upon activities, jobs, and roles.

== Episodes ==
National Geographic TV producers did not produce Taboo in seasons of fixed episode counts, thus the number of episodes in each production batch varies wildly. The production order does not necessarily match the order episodes were arranged into for DVD "season" boxsets. In total, 118 episodes have aired.

Season	Episodes	Originally aired
Specials	6	
1	12	2002
2	12	2003–2004
3	15	2004–2005
4	13	2007
5	15	2008
6	6	2010
7	6	2011
8	4	2012
9	18	2012
10	11	2013

=== Season 1 ===
1. "Food" - Sep. 30, 2002
2. "Healers" - Oct. 7, 2002
3. "Tattoo" - Oct. 14, 2002
4. "Voodoo" - Oct. 21, 2002
5. "Witchcraft" - Oct. 28, 2002
6. "Marriage" - Nov. 4, 2002
7. "Drugs" - Nov. 11, 2002
8. "Evil Spirits" - Nov. 18, 2002
9. "Sexuality" - Dec. 2, 2002
10. "Death" - Dec. 9, 2002
11. "Test of Faith" - Dec. 23, 2002
12. "Blood Sports" - Dec. 29, 2002

"Death" is not featured on the National Geographic page for the show. However it does appear on the first season boxset.

=== Season 2 ===
1. "Justice" - Oct. 6, 2003
2. "Delicacies" - Oct. 13, 2003
3. "Creature Cures" - Oct. 20, 2003
4. "After Death" - Nov. 3, 2003
5. "Body Perfect" - Nov. 10, 2003
6. "Sacred Pain" Dec. 8, 2003
7. "Rites of Passage" - Dec. 30, 2003
8. "Child Rearing" - Jan. 12, 2004
9. "Extreme Entertainers" - Jan. 19, 2004
10. "Blood Bonds" - Jan. 26, 2004
11. "Marks of Identity" - Mar. 15, 2004
12. "Initiation" - Mar. 23, 2004

=== Season 3 ===
1. "Outcasts" - Jun. 14, 2004
2. "Extreme Living" - Jun. 30, 2004
3. "Spirit Worlds" - Jul. 07, 2004
4. "Extreme Cuisine" - Jul. 14, 2004
5. "Extreme Childhood" - Jul. 21, 2004
6. "Body Cutters" - Jul. 28, 2004
7. "Body Art" - Aug. 04, 2004
8. "Gross Grub" - Sept. 13, 2004
9. "Rites of Manhood" - Sept. 20, 2004
10. "Possessed" - Oct. 4, 2004
11. "Altered States" - Oct. 4, 2004
12. "Gender Benders" - Oct. 18, 2004
13. "Blood Rites" - Nov. 8, 2004
14. "Crime Scene" - Jan. 27, 2005
15. "Gross Work" - Jan. 27, 2005

=== Season 4 ===
1. "Initiation Rituals" - Aug. 5, 2007
2. "Skin Deep" - Aug. 5, 2007
3. "Sexual Identity" - Aug. 8, 2007
4. "Signs of Identity" - Aug. 15, 2007
5. "Proving Ground" - Aug. 22, 2007
6. "Body Modification" - Aug. 29, 2007
7. "Nudity" - Sept. 5, 2007
8. "Trials of Faith" - Oct. 3, 2007
9. "Pets" - Oct. 10, 2007
10. "Gross Food" - Oct. 31, 2007
11. "Extreme Performers" - Nov. 11, 2007
12. "Jobs" - Nov. 14, 2007
13. "Mating" - Nov. 21, 2007

=== Season 5 ===
1. "Touching Death" - Aug. 6, 2008
2. "Extreme Kids" - Aug. 6, 2008
3. "Supreme Devotion" - Aug. 13, 2008
4. "Body Extremes" - Aug. 20, 2008
5. "Extreme Healing" - Aug. 27, 2008
6. "Trial by Fire" - Sept. 3, 2008
7. "Extreme Eats" - Sept. 10, 2008
8. "Outsiders" - Sept. 17, 2008
9. "Drugs" - Oct. 15, 2008
10. "The Third Sex" - Oct. 22, 2008
11. "Extreme Punishment" - Oct. 29, 2008
12. "Bizarre Bodies" - Nov. 10, 2008
13. "Extreme Rituals" - Nov. 24, 2008
14. "Spilling Blood" - Dec. 1, 2008
15. "Sex" - Dec. 8, 2008

=== Season 6 ===
1. "Prostitution" - Jan. 17, 2010
2. "Fat" - Jan. 20, 2010
3. "Misfits" - Jan. 27, 2010
4. "Narcotics" - Feb. 3, 2010
5. "Strange Love" - Feb. 10, 2010
6. "Beyond the Grave" - Feb. 17, 2010

=== Season 7 ===
1. "Beauty" - May 2, 2011
2. "Fantasy Lives" - May 2, 2011
3. "Addiction" - May 9, 2011
4. "Hoarders" - May 16, 2011
5. "Prison Love" - May 23, 2011
6. "Forbidden Love" - Jun. 12, 2011

=== Season 8 ===
1. "Secret Lives" - Jan. 3, 2012
2. "Odd Couples" - Jan. 10, 2012
3. "Extreme Fighting" - Jan. 17, 2012
4. "Freaky Remedies" - Jan. 24, 2012

=== Season 9 ===
1. "Living With the Dead" - Jun. 17, 2012
2. "Strange Behavior" - Jun. 24, 2012
3. "Booze" - Jul. 1, 2012
4. "Teen Sex" - Jul. 8, 2012
5. "Extreme Collectors" - Jul. 15, 2012
6. "Ugly" - Jul. 22, 2012
7. "Nasty Jobs" - Jul. 29, 2012
8. "Weird Weddings" - Aug. 5, 2012
9. "Strange Passions" - Aug. 19, 2012
10. "U.S. of Alcohol" - Sept. 2, 2012
11. "Extreme Bodies" - Sept. 23, 2012
12. "Changing Sex" - Sept. 30, 2012
13. "Weird Collections" - Oct. 2, 2012
14. "Private Passions" - Oct. 9, 2012
15. "Old Enough?" - Oct. 16, 2012
16. "Strange Syndromes" - Oct. 23, 2012
17. "Bizarre Burials" - Oct. 30, 2012
18. "Devils and Demons" - Nov. 19, 2012

=== Season 10 ===
This "season" consists of episodes from a spin-off series: "Taboo USA".

1. "Secret Passions" - Jun. 04, 2013
2. "Strange Bonds" - Jun. 11, 2013
3. "Odd Jobs" - Jun. 18, 2013
4. "Forever Young" - Jun. 25, 2013
5. "Strange Obsessions" - Jul. 02, 2013
6. "Inked, Pierced & Hooked" - Jul. 09, 2013
7. "Extreme Obesity" - Jul. 16, 2013
8. "Strange Medicine" - Jul. 23, 2013
9. "Body Shock" - Jul. 30, 2013
10. "Home Strange Home" - Aug. 06, 2013
11. "Strange Medicine" - Dec. 17, 2013

=== Specials ===
1. The original Taboo pilot aired as a special in 2002.
2. "Sex Swap" - 2007
3. "Marked for Life" - March 2, 2008
4. "Quest for Acceptance" - March 26, 2008
5. "Ritualized" - Dec. 5, 2014
6. "New Shades of Sex" - Dec. 5, 2014
7. "Express Your Body" - Dec. 5, 2014

== Featured individuals ==
- Miss Plus America, Steph DeWaegeneer; Ms. Plus America 2009, featured in the episode "Fat".
- The Lizardman, Erik Sprague, featured in the episode "Outcast".
