= Hong Kong Electronics Fair =

Hong Kong Electronics Fair (Autumn Edition) is organized by the Hong Kong Trade Development Council (HKTDC) and to be held at the Hong Kong Convention and Exhibition Centre in October every year. One of the fair's highlights is the Hall of Fame – a special section dedicated to high-quality electronic products that are distinguished by their design and function. The fair is organized into key thematic zones ranging from audio-visual products to navigation systems, and from home appliances to telecommunications products. At Technology Exchange Zone, Hong Kong's leading research facilities and companies display their latest technology ideas. In addition, a number of testing, inspection & certification services companies will exhibit at the fair, presenting an array of related services for the electronics industry.
