= Patrick Lin (chef) =

Patrick Lin, born in Hong Kong, is Senior Executive Chef for Metropolitan Hotels, overseeing the company's five restaurants in Toronto:

- Senses Restaurant and Bakery
- Lai Wah Heen
- Lai Toh Heen
- Hemispheres Bistro
- Diva at the Met

== Career ==
Lin began his culinary career when he joined the Regent Hotel, Hong Kong in 1980 as a kitchen clerk. Determined to satisfy his passion for cooking, he spent his days off working in the kitchen as a trainee. After two years, his commitment was rewarded with an appointment to junior chef and then a promotion to senior chef in the main production kitchen.

Under the mentorship of executive chef Gray Kunz at the hotel, Lin developed his style of blending Western and Eastern cooking techniques. During this time, his culinary excellence was recognized with awards from the Hong Kong Food Festival, the International Culinary Art Exhibition “Culinary Olympics”, as well as designation as “The Most Outstanding Chef” from the Food and Hotel Asia International Salon Culinaire.

After a decade at the Regent Hotel, Lin immigrated to Canada, becoming chef of the Truffles restaurant at the Four Seasons Hotel. During his tenure, Truffles earned a five-diamond designation by AAA/CAA, as well as the DiRONA award, and Mobile Five Star Award.

After four years at Truffles, Lin' returned to Hong Kong as executive chef of Quo Quo Restaurant. Moving later to Paramount Restaurants as culinary consultant, he oversaw the team of chefs at their five restaurant sites. While in Hong Kong, he also held positions at Joyce Café Restaurant and The Excelsior Hotel.

Lin returned to Canada in 1998 as chef de cuisine at Truffles. A year later, he joined the Metropolitan Hotel Toronto and Hemispheres Restaurant and Bistro as executive chef where he oversaw the Metropolitan's culinary program, including banquets, in-room dining and the restaurant. Lin also shared his knowledge of Chinese cooking with the team at Lai Wah Heen, the Metropolitan Hotel's Chinese restaurant.

In 2002, Lin traveled back to Hong Kong to become executive sous chef at The Royal Garden Hotel. His job encompassed the management of the food and beverage operation of the hotel, including its restaurants – Dong Lai Shun, Inagiku, The Royal Garden Chinese Restaurant, Sabatini and Greenery.

In early 2007, Canada and the Metropolitan Hotels’ family of restaurants beckoned him again, this time as executive chef of Senses Restaurant, located at the SoHo Metropolitan Hotel in Toronto.

Lin is a graduate of the Educational Institute of the American Hotel and Motel Association, as well as additional programs in Hong Kong and North America.
