= Hong Kong International Building and Decoration Materials & Hardware Fair =

Hong Kong International Building and Decoration Materials & Hardware Fair is an annual trade show in Hong Kong. The show is organised by the Hong Kong Trade Development Council and the CIEC Exhibition Company (HK) Limited, held annually (usually in October) at the AsiaWorld-Expo, Hong Kong. This fair is positioned as a one-stop shop for all building, decoration and hardware needs, with a wide range of products and services on offer from exhibitors. Regular exhibit categories reflect both the needs of the market and the growing interest in do-it-yourself (DIY) products for interior decoration.

== Major exhibit categories ==
- Bathroom & Kitchen
- Building & Decorative Hardware
- Building Technology
- Ceiling and Curtain Wall
- Ceramics, Stone & Marble
- Coating & Chemicals
- Door & Window
- Furniture
- Indoor Decorative Materials
