= Carolyn Marvin =

Professor and author

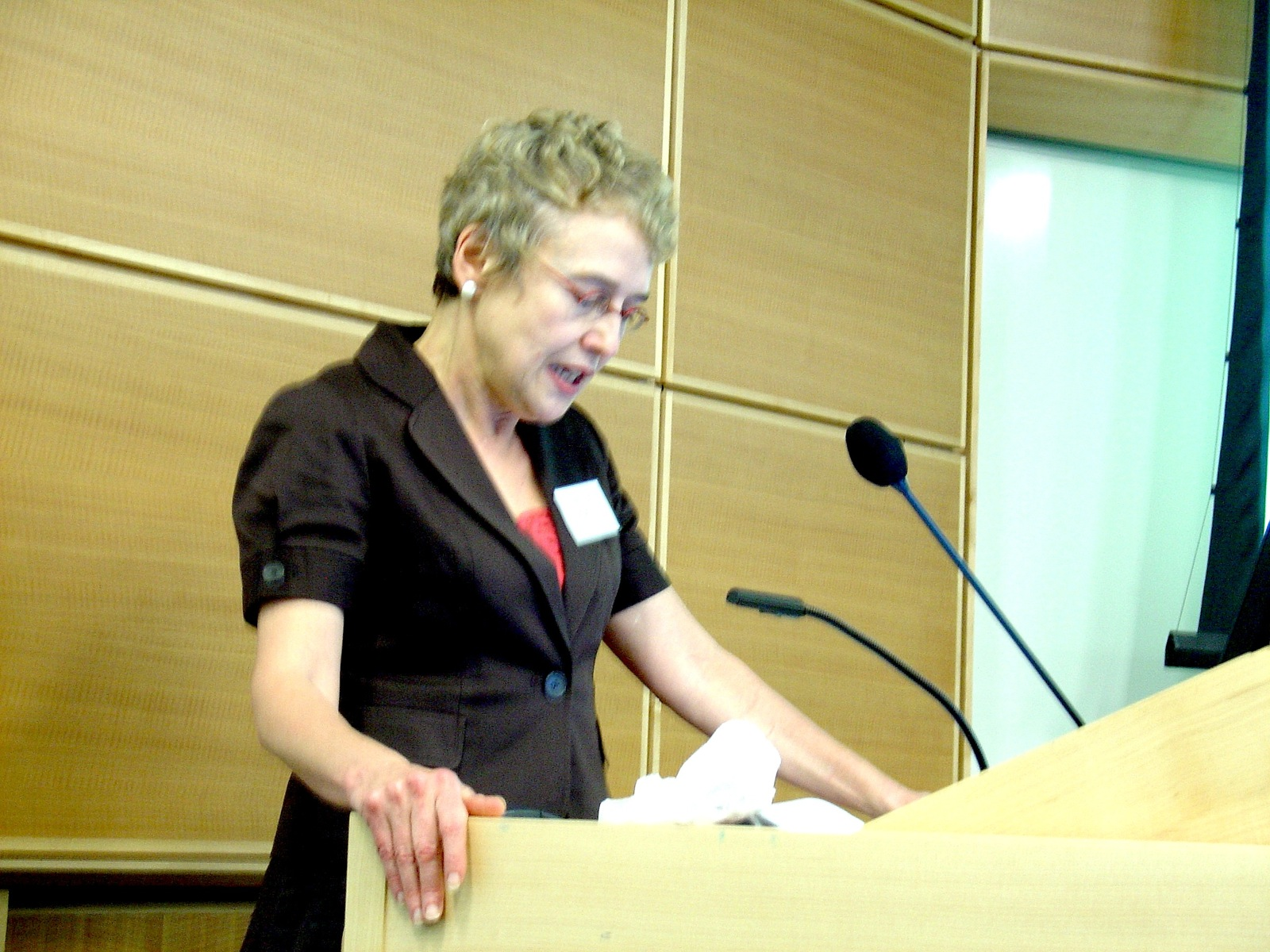
Marvin in 2006

Carolyn Marvin is a professor and author who specializes in communication, culture and media, political communication, and technology and society. Marvin is currently the Frances Yates Emeritus Professor of Communication at the University of Pennsylvania's Annenberg School for Communication. Marvin is the author of two major publications, When Old Technologies Were New and Blood Sacrifice and the Nation: Totem Rituals and the American Flag.

== Research and reviews ==
Marvin published When Old Technologies Were New in 1988. The book discusses topics such as communications, media, and the history of telecommunications as Marvin explores how early technologies impacted society, culture, and modern day communications.

The book did receive some critiques from academic sources. Richard Rudolph from the University of Massachusetts Boston praises Marvin's work overall but notes her use of stories rather than analysis at times as well as his thoughts on what other information could have been included about societal changes. Brian Winston of Pennsylvania State University writes that Marvin makes many interesting points about denying technological determinist vision and how the spread of electricity created a divide between those who had and could control electricity and those who could not. He also critiques the first chapter of the book saying that it does not make claims as important as the rest of the work and points out that he feels more evidence might be seen as being needed. A review by Kenneth Lipartito in the Journal of Social History discusses Marvin's book and poses strengths such as her textual analysis but also her weaknesses in sources and how many of them are potentially biased as trade journals and unclear as to their notability or reach. Susan Smulyan praises Marvin's historical analysis and the potential interest to historians and communication and media scholars alike in her review in the University of Chicago Press's peer reviewed journal Isis. David Nye, an associate professor at the University of Copenhagen, commends Marvin's work overall in his review in the journal Technology and Culture and compliments the thoroughness of her research and the connections she poses between communication, technology, and society.

Marvin's other book, Blood Sacrifice and the Nation: Totem Rituals and the American Flag, also received reviews and criticism. William Swatos, a scholar of religious studies, critiques Marvin and her co-author David Ingle for their belief in totemism and writes that their work is less analysis than just writing. Though the book did receive criticism, it also received praise. Heidi Hamilton of Augustana College (now Augustana University) praises Marvin and Ingle's work in the journal, Rhetoric and Public Affairs, for using the lens of totemism to view the militarism and violence in America.

== Personal life ==
Marvin began blocking delivery robots in Philadelphia as a form of protest for months before she was arrested and charged with disorderly conduct after an October 2026 confrontation.
