= Dave Palumbo =

American bodybuilder

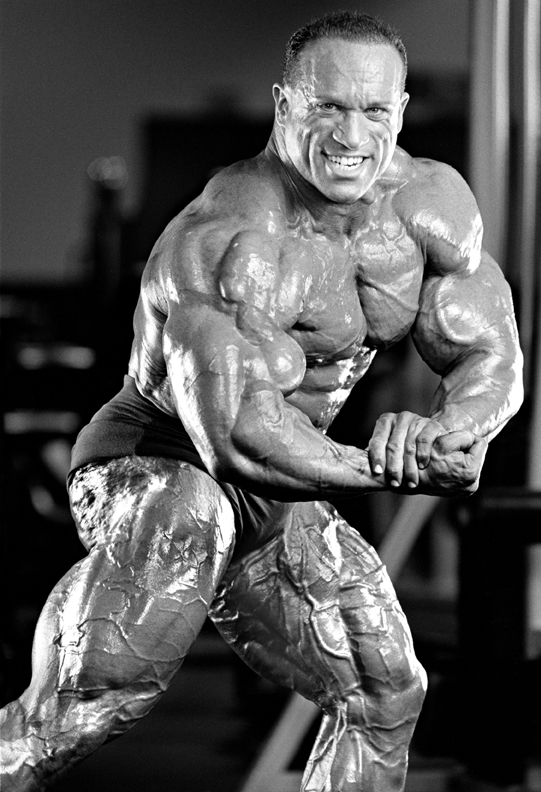
- Born: David Christopher Palumbo; February 17, 1968 (age 58); Manhattan, New York, United States
- Occupations: CEO and founder of Rxmuscle.com and Species Nutrition
- Years active: 1990–present
- Height: 5 ft 9 in (1.75 m)

David Christopher Palumbo (born February 17, 1968) is an American retired bodybuilder. He competed in his first bodybuilding competition in 1990, an NPC national competition in New York City, where he placed 6th place weighing in at 168 lbs. In just 5 years, Palumbo would gain 70 lbs and win the overall at the 1995 NPC Junior Nationals. His best placing in competition came at the 2003 NPC USA Championships where he finished 2nd place in the Super Heavyweight class.

Palumbo is the former Editor-in-Chief of Muscular Development magazine. Today, Palumbo is the CEO and Founder of RxMuscle.com and owner of Species Nutrition. Palumbo is also contest prep coach for several NPC and IFBB bodybuilding, fitness, and figure competitors. He is known for his low carb approach to preparing his athletes for competition. Palumbo is also the founder of the S.M.A.R.T. personal training certification program.

== Competition history ==
Dave Palumbo's athletic beginning did not start in bodybuilding. He was a long-distance runner throughout his youth and onto college. At the age of 22, Palumbo began to lift weights and in 6 months of training he competed in his first bodybuilding competition at the 1990 NPC Natural New York City weighing in at 168 lb. where he took 6th place in the middleweight class.

Palumbo would quickly rise in bodybuilding and in 5 years he would win the 1995 NPC Junior USA Championships. At this point Palumbo would embark on a quest to turn professional in the IFBB. From 1995 to 2004, Palumbo would attempt to turn pro 16 times at qualifying events, but never placed higher than runner-up position at the NPC Nationals and NPC USA Championships.

=== Competition results ===
1990 NPC Natural New York City – 6th, Middleweight (168 lbs)

1992 NPC NJ Suburban Bodybuilding Champs – 5th, Light Heavyweight (198 lbs)

1992 Natural Tri State Championships – 1st, Heavyweight (202 lbs)

1992 NPC Eastern USA – 3rd, Heavyweight (212 lbs)

1992 NPC Westchester – 2nd, Heavyweight (212 lbs)

1994 NPC NY Metropolitan Bodybuilding Champs – 1st, Heavyweight (228 lbs)

1994 NPC Jr USA – 3rd, Heavyweight (228 lbs)

1994 Amateur Grand Prix – 1st, Heavyweight and Overall Champ (235 lbs)

1995 NPC Jr Nationals – 1st, Heavyweight (258 lbs)

1995 NPC USA Champs – 7th, Heavyweight (256 lbs)

1996 NPC USA – 7th (254 lbs)

1996 NPC Nationals – 4th (268 lbs)

1997 NPC USA – 6th (270 lbs)

1997 NPC Nationals – 5th (272 lbs)

1998 IFBB North American – 6th (281 lbs)

1998 NPC Nationals – 8th, Super Heavyweight (273 lbs)

1999 NPC USA – 9th

2000 NPC NY Metropolitan – 1st, Super Heavyweight and Overall (275 lbs)

2000 NPC USA – 4th, Super Heavyweight (274 lbs)

2000 NPC Nationals – 8th, Super Heavyweight (268 lbs)

2001 NPC USA – 7th, Super Heavyweight (265 lbs)

2001 IFBB North American – 5th, Super Heavyweight (271 lbs)

2002 NPC USA – 3rd, Super Heavyweight (260 lbs)

2002 NPC Nationals – 2nd, Super Heavyweight (260 lbs)

2003 NPC USAs – 2nd, Super Heavyweight (265 lbs)

2003 NPC Nationals – 6th, Super Heavyweight (268 lbs)

2004 NPC USA – 6th, Super Heavyweight (258 lbs)

== Muscular development ==
In 2001, Palumbo was hired to write a monthly column for Muscular Development Magazine titled The Anabolic Freak. Several years later, he was promoted to editor of the website, a position he held until being terminated in 2009.

== Human growth hormone ==
In 2004, Palumbo pleaded guilty and was sentenced to 5 months in federal prison for distributing human growth hormone to athletes.

Palumboism, named after Dave Palumbo, also known as "steroid gut" or "bubble gut", is a condition that primarily affects bodybuilders and other athletes who heavily use muscle growth enhancing drugs or hormones. It is characterized by the abnormal enlargement and protrusion of the abdominal area, specifically the oblique muscles, in relation to the chest. This condition results in the appearance of a bloated and distended abdomen, which can be disproportionately large compared to the rest of the body.

== Species Nutrition ==
Palumbo is the owner and president of Species Nutrition. Species Nutrition's product line includes protein, fiber, fat loss, sleep-aid, joint relief, and health-related supplements.

== Web interviewer and radio host ==
Palumbo hosts the YouTube channel RXMuscle: The Truth In Bodybuilding, which has a variety of videos including a Q&A program called #AskDave (which has 51 episodes), "Live With" interview series and various update programs which feature news in the world of bodybuilding. In August he interviewed Janae Marie Kroc.
