= Chumpol NaLamlieng =

Chumpol NaLamlieng (Thai: ชุมพล ณ ลำเลียง; RTGS: Chumphon Na Lamliang, born in 1945) is the former President of Siam Cement Group until 2005. He received B.Sc in M.E. from University of Washington in Seattle, Washington, and also an MBA from Harvard University. He first worked as a World Bank loan officer and was then recruited in 1968 by Bankers Trust, N.Y. to set up Thai Investment and Securities Co., Ltd.(TISCO)—the first investment bank in Thailand. After heading Corporate Finance at TISCO, he joined Siam Cement, where he worked until his retirement. He remains a director of many companies, including British Airways and SingTel.
