= Singapore Comic Con =

Comic book convention in Singapore

- Status: Active
- Genre: Multigenre
- Frequency: Annually
- Venue: Marina Bay Sands
- Coordinates: 1°16′57″N 103°51′36″E
- Country: Singapore
- Inaugurated: June 28, 2008; 18 years ago (as Singapore Toy & Comic Convention)
- Most recent: December 7, 2025
- Attendance: 56,530 (2022)
- Organizer: Generation Experience Ptd Ltd
- Website: www.singaporecomiccon.com

Singapore Comic Con is a comic book convention and multi-genre entertainment event held annually in Singapore since 2008. Prior independent conventions were held in 1986 and 1987. The current series was first mooted in 2008 as Singapore Toy & Comic Convention, and quickly expanded into Singapore Toy, Games & Comic Convention. It was brought online during COVID-19 pandemic in 2020. Since 2019, the convention has been rebranded as Singapore Comic Con.

== History ==
=== 1986–1987: Precursor ===
Comicon, the first known comic book convention in Singapore, was held in 1986 at the President Merlin hotel by a group of hardcore comic fans. The organisers were expecting 500 attendees, but the event drew 900 people. Although there was criticism that the event was disorganised, it was reported that nobody was in a hurry to go home. In 1987, the second edition was held at York Hotel, and was headlined by Mike Grell and Todd McFarlane. Organisers stated that it cost SGD 15,000 to hold the convention, and not all monies had been paid out before the start of the convention. 1,200 people turned up for the convention.

=== 2008–2018: Singapore Toy & Comic Convention and Singapore Toy, Games & Comic Convention ===
In 2008, the Singapore Toy & Comic Convention was held at Suntec Convention and Exhibition Centre at the end of the month of June. It was organised by Play Imaginative Events (PI Events) and 3000 people pre-registered for the event. By the end of the two-day event, 140,000 people turned up and left a positive impression on the various vendors and artists such as Sonny Liew, Gary Erskine and Pete Fowler.

In 2009, PI Events added games into the convention and thus the convention name was renamed to Singapore Toy, Games & Comic Convention. Held between 14 and 16 August, the convention space doubled from last year to 6,110 sq m and attracted international companies such as Hasbro and Nintendo to exhibit their offerings. A conference on joining the creative industry was planned as well. More than 74,000 people turned up for the convention.

In 2010, Reed Exhibitions acquired STGCC. The convention continued to be held at Suntec, until in 2012 when it moved to Marina Bay Sands (MBS), where its convention centre allows for a larger convention to be held. In 2010, Marvel Comics exhibited at STGCC, making it the first time that it had done so in a convention in Asia. Subsequent conventions continued to be held at MBS. (Note: Conventions' references for 2013–2018: 2013; 2014; 2015; 2016; 2017; 2018) In 2016, STGCC moved into the larger halls in the MBS convention centre. In 2017, STGCC not only was held in MBS, but also had set up interactive Star Wars installation along Orchard Road.

=== 2019–present: Singapore Comic Con ===
In 2019, Reed Exhibitions simplified the name of the convention to Singapore Comic Con (SGCC). It was held as a part of the Singapore Media Festival annually henceforth. SGCC introduced the Work In Progress program to discover local and regional talents.

The convention was cancelled in 2020 due to the COVID-19 pandemic in Singapore. Reed Exhibitions would then licence Singapore Comic Con to a local exhibition event company, Generation Experience in May 2021. The 2021 edition was held virtually across five weekends in December, with the sessions held online.

In 2022, the convention returned to Marina Bay Sands and a mascot designed by Singapore collectibles company, Mighty Jaxx, for the convention, P4L (short for Pop Culture 4 Life) was introduced. The first Loki wax figure in Asia was unveiled by Madame Tussauds Singapore at the event in the same year.

Singapore Comic Con promotion at City Square Mall in 2023.

In 2023, Singapore Comic Con introduced Creator Con, targeting at content creators. In 2023, it expanded its Artist Alley to take two floors of the convention centre, with 4 halls taken in total The growth of the convention continued in 2025, now occupying five halls of Marina Bay Sands. Industry Day Zero, an initiative for the various industry players to network was introduced in 2025 as well.

== Conventions ==
Period	Name	Main organiser	Venue	Ref
1986–87	Comicon ’86 / ’87	Independent fan organisers	President Merlin Hotel ('86) Hotel York ('87)	
2008	Singapore Toy & Comic Convention (STCC)	PI Events / Play Imaginative	Suntec	
2009	Singapore Toy, Games & Comic Convention (STGCC)	PI Events / Play Imaginative	Suntec	
2010–11	Singapore Toy, Games & Comic Convention (STGCC)	Reed Exhibitions / ReedPOP	Suntec	
2012–16	Singapore Toy, Games & Comic Convention (STGCC)	Reed Exhibitions / ReedPOP	Marina Bay Sands	
2017	Singapore Toy, Games & Comic Convention (STGCC)	Reed Exhibitions / ReedPOP	Marina Bay Sands Orchard Road	
2018	Singapore Toy, Games & Comic Convention (STGCC)	Reed Exhibitions / ReedPOP	Marina Bay Sands	
2019	Singapore Comic Con (SGCC)	Reed Exhibitions / ReedPOP	Marina Bay Sands	
2020	Cancelled	—	—	
2021	Virtual/limited activity; SGCC licence transferred	Generation Experience	Online	
2022–present	SGCC	Generation Experience	Marina Bay Sands	(Note: Conventions' references for 2022–present: 2022; 2023; 2024; 2025)
