= HKTDC Food Expo =

Hong Kong Food Exposition 香港美食博覽
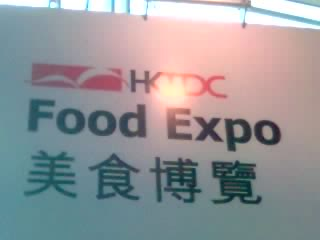
- Status: active
- Genre: exhibition
- Location: HKCEC
- Major events: Food and beverage trade show
- Organiser: 1989
- Sponsor: Hong Kong Trade Development Council
- Website: http://hkfoodexpo.hktdc.com/index.htm
- 11-15 August 2022

HKTDC Food Expo is an annual food and beverage exhibition held each summer in Hong Kong. It is open to the public and industry participants.

== Overview ==
The Food Expo is organised by the Hong Kong Trade Development Council (HKTDC) and held at the Hong Kong Convention and Exhibition Centre in August every year since 1989. The Expo includes a Trade Hall and a Public Hall. The Food Expo also includes a series of sessions in which food experts share their tips and cooking demonstrations by chefs.

== Effect of Covid Pandemic ==
The expo was cancelled in 2020, and the 2021 and 2022 festivals were severely affected by the Covid pandemic. Due to government anti-epidemic measures, visitors were required to wear masks and the tasting of food was prohibited. Some stalls and visitors were accused of secretly violating these rules.

The Food Expo is set to return in 2023, although the organizers have not said whether the tasting ban will remain.

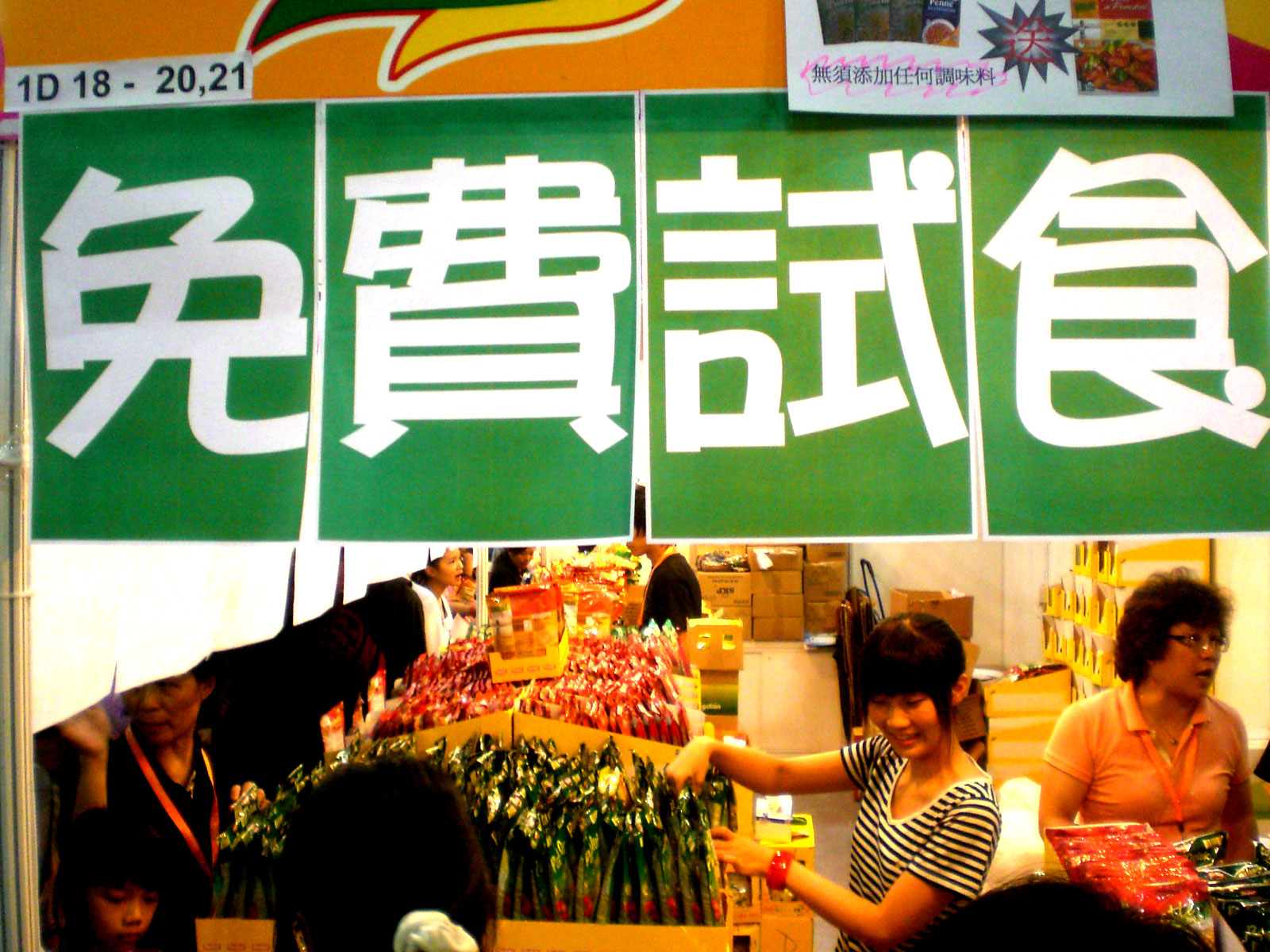
A stall offering free samples

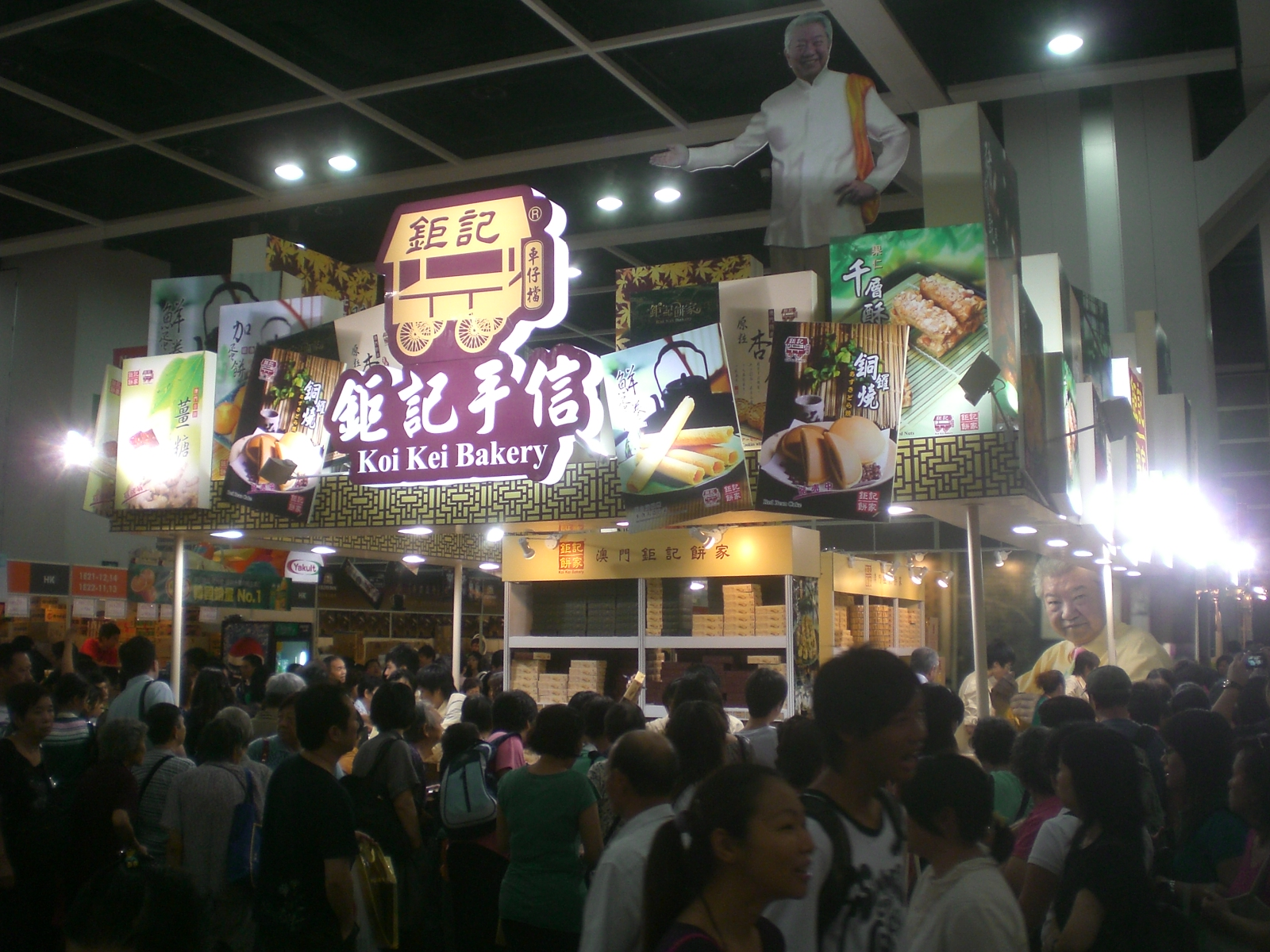
The Koi Kei Bakery stall

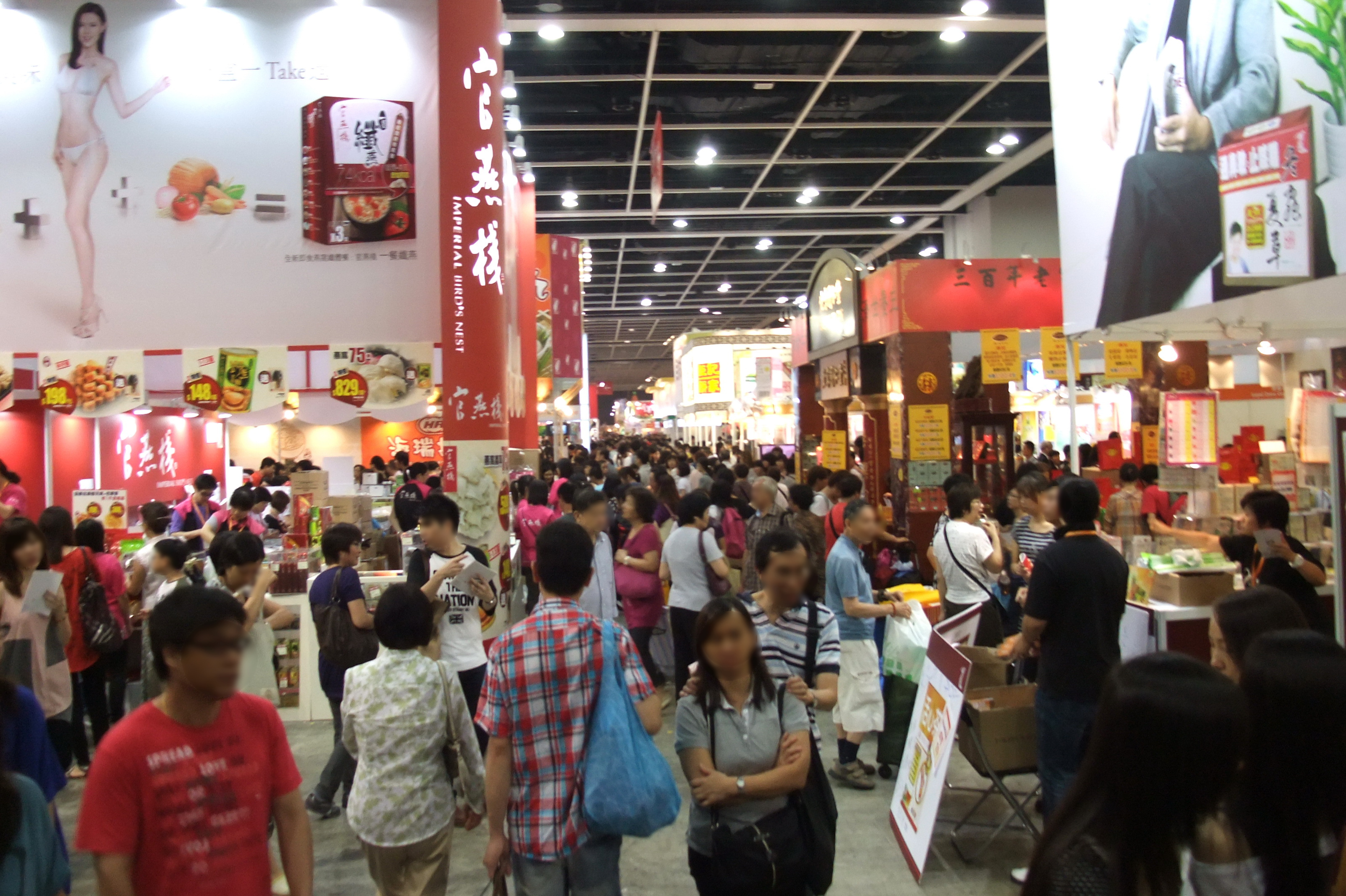
Scene on the exhibition floor
