= Hong Kong Convention and Exhibition Centre =

Events venue in Wan Chai, Hong Kong

- 香港會議展覽中心
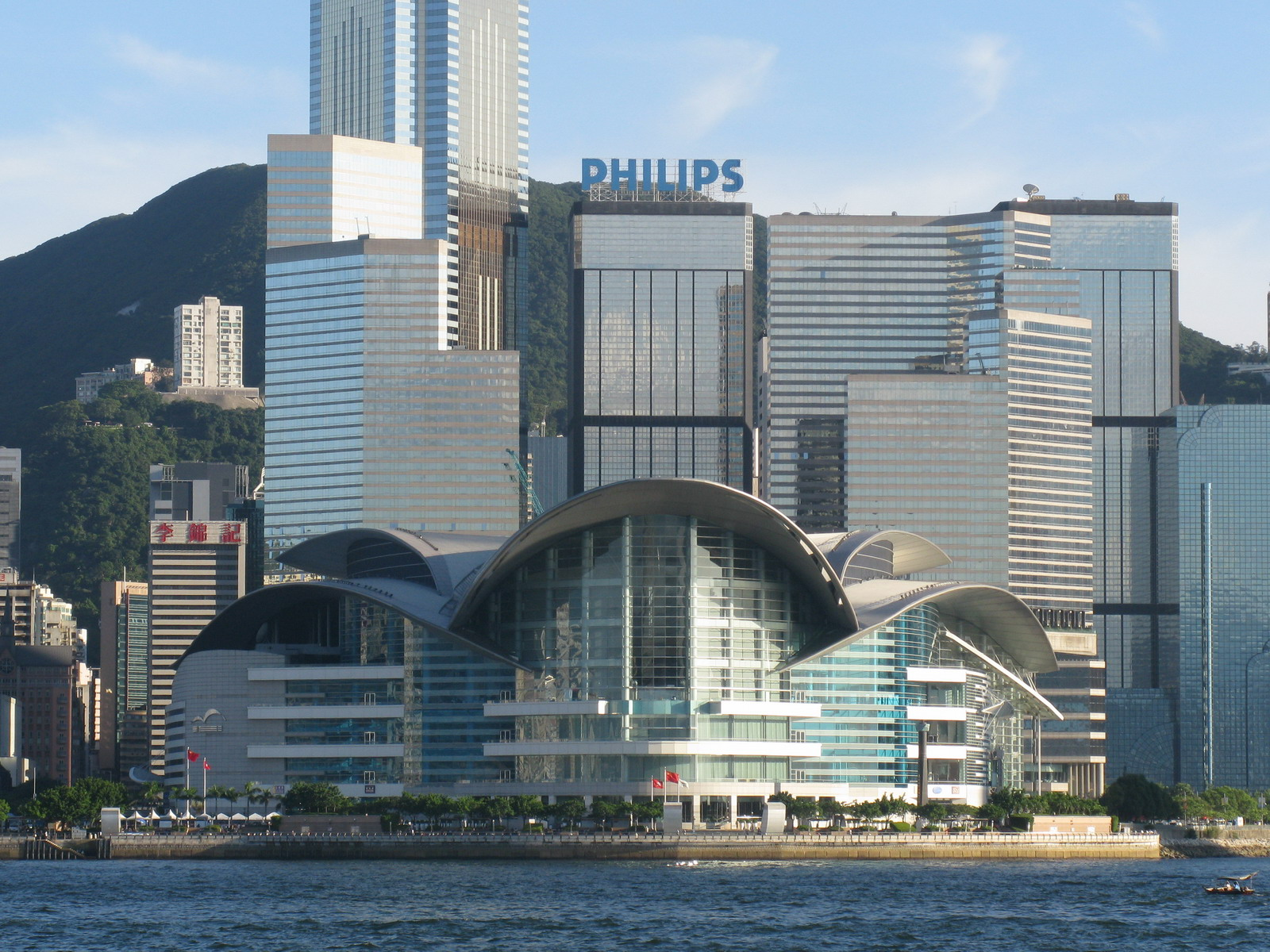
- Hong Kong Convention and Exhibition Centre in August 2008
- Interactive map of the Hong Kong Convention and Exhibition Centre area

General information
- Status: Completed
- Type: Congress Centre
- Location: 1 Expo Drive, Wan Chai, Wan Chai District, Hong Kong
- Coordinates: 22°17′1.18″N 114°10′22.25″E
- Construction started: 8 March 1985; 41 years ago (Old Wing); 1994; 32 years ago (New Wing)
- Completed: 1988; 38 years ago (Old Wing); 1989; 37 years ago (Topside development, including Grand Hyatt Hong Kong)
- Opened: 25 November 1988; 37 years ago (Old Wing); 14 June 1997; 29 years ago (New Wing)
- Renovated: 2006–2009

Technical details
- Floor count: 6

Design and construction
- Architect: Larry Oltmanns
- Architecture firm: Skidmore, Owings & Merrill
- Structural engineer: Skidmore, Owings & Merrill

Other information
- Seating capacity: 3,800 (Grand Hall)

Website
- www.hkcec.com

Hong Kong Convention and Exhibition Centre
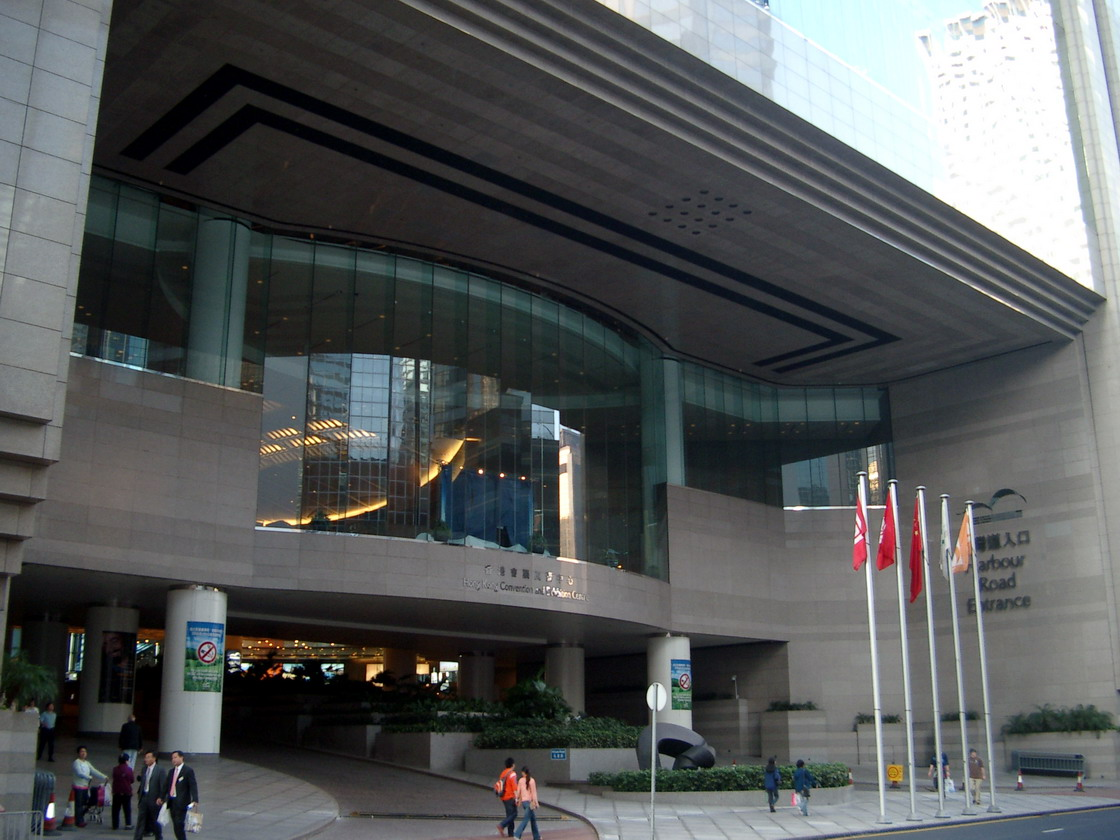
- Harbour Road Entrance to the Hong Kong Convention and Exhibition Centre in November 2005
- Traditional Chinese: 香港會議展覽中心
- Simplified Chinese: 香港会议展览中心
Transcriptions
Standard Mandarin
- Hanyu Pinyin: Xiānggǎng Huìyìzhǎnlǎn Zhōngxīn
Yue: Cantonese
- Yale Romanization: Hēunggóng Wuihyíhjínláahm Jūngsām
- Jyutping: Hoeng1 gong2 wui6 ji5 zin2 laam5 zung1 sam1

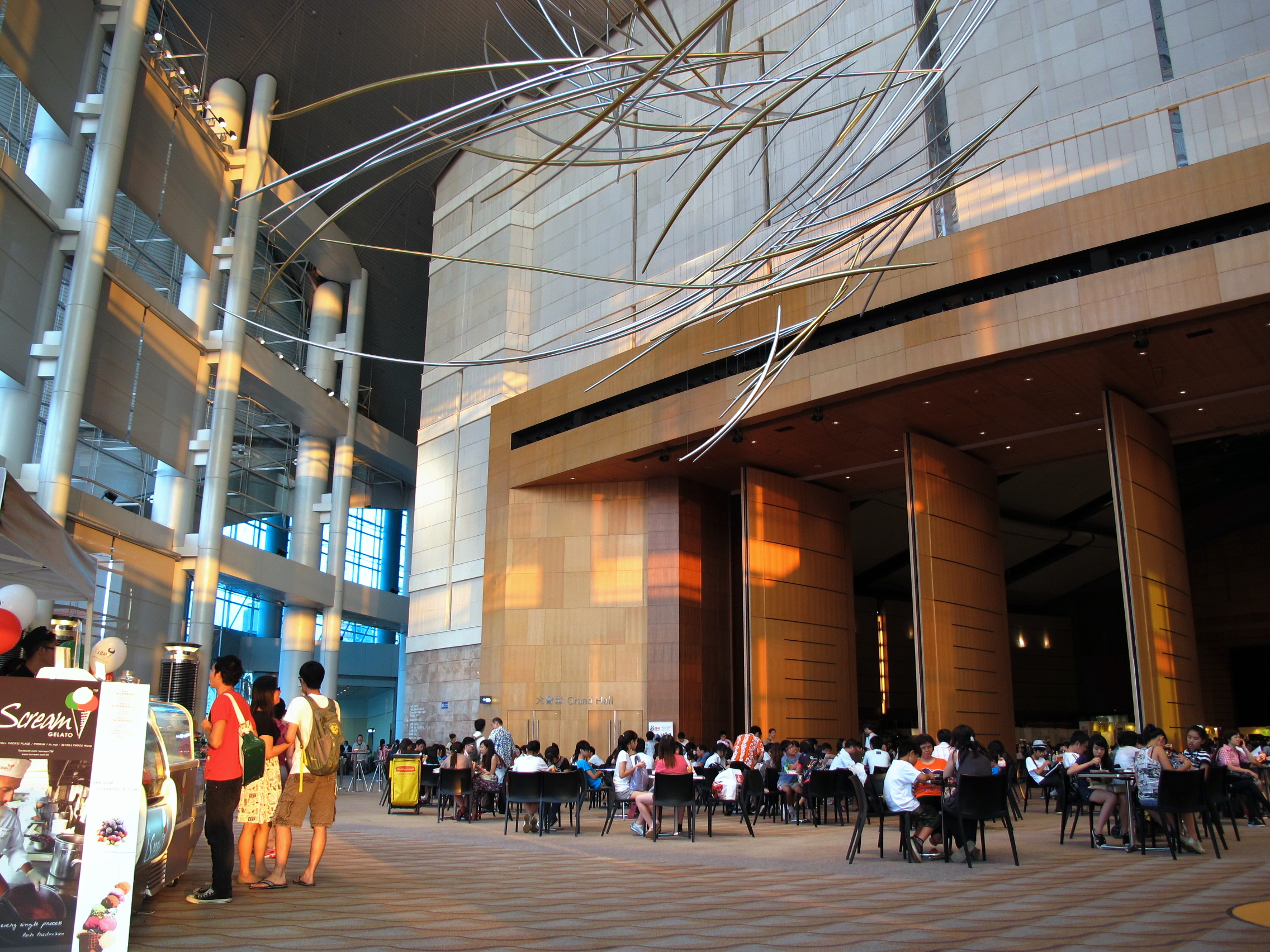
Grand Hall of Hong Kong Convention and Exhibition Centre in July 2011

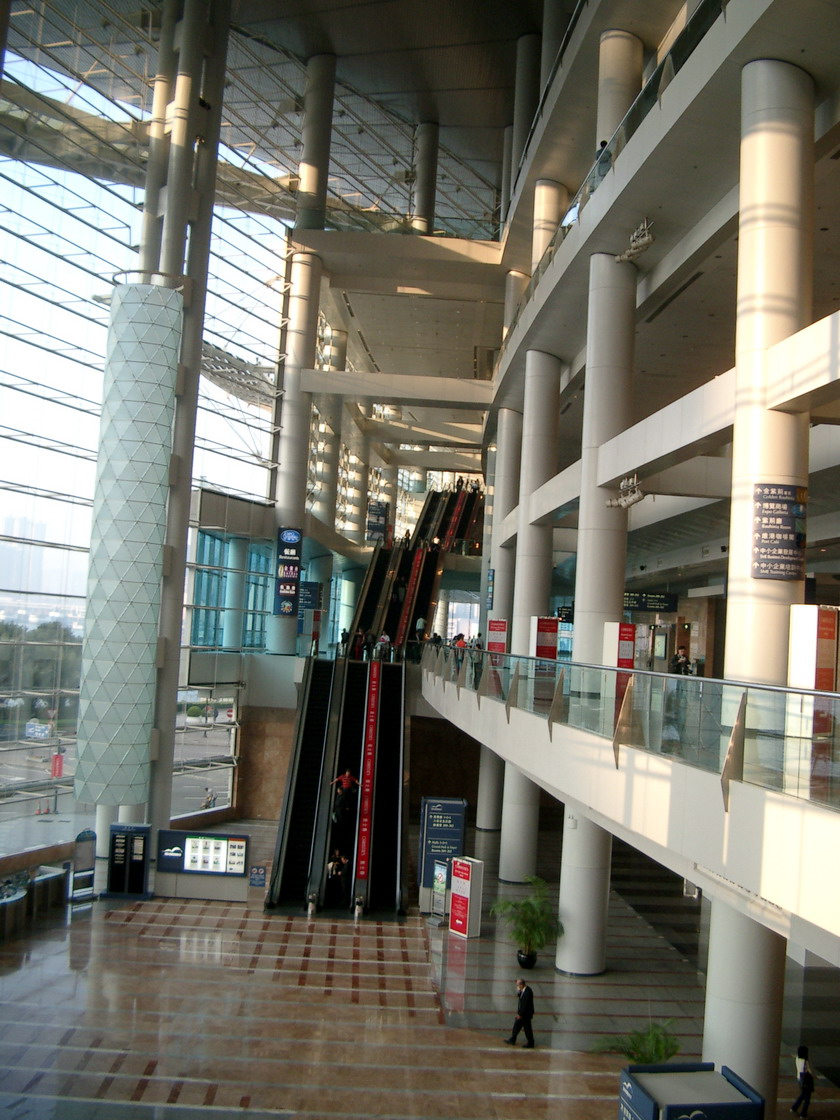
Interior at Northbound of Phase 2 of the Centre in October 2005

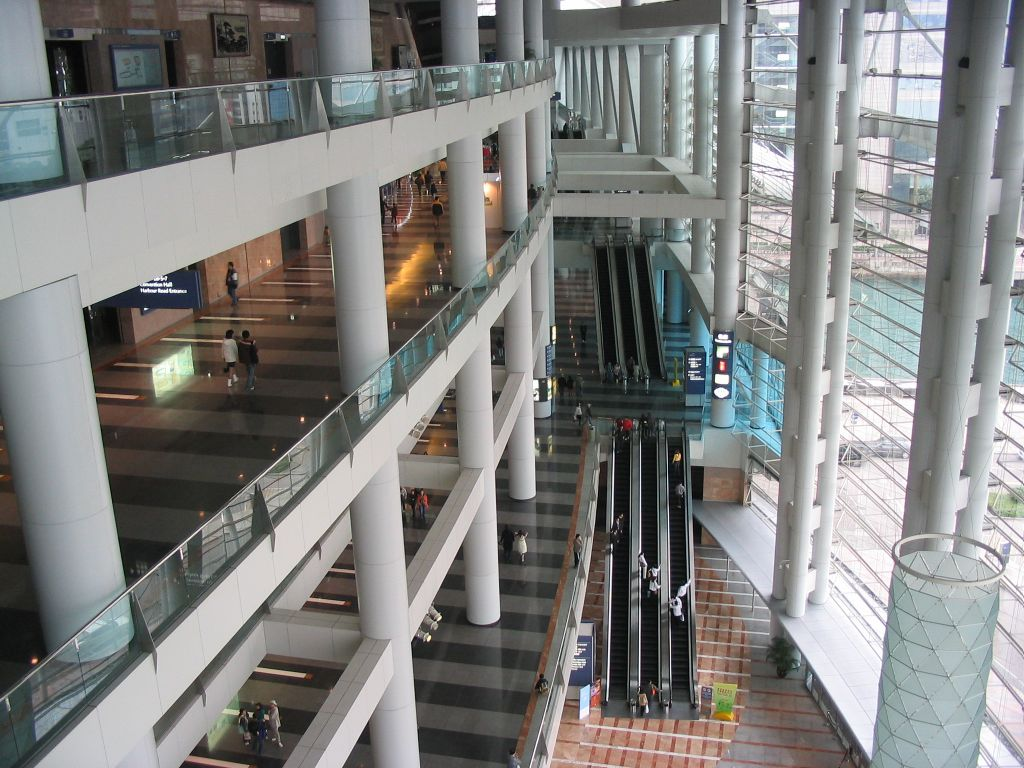
Interior at Southbound of Phase 2 of the Centre in October 2005

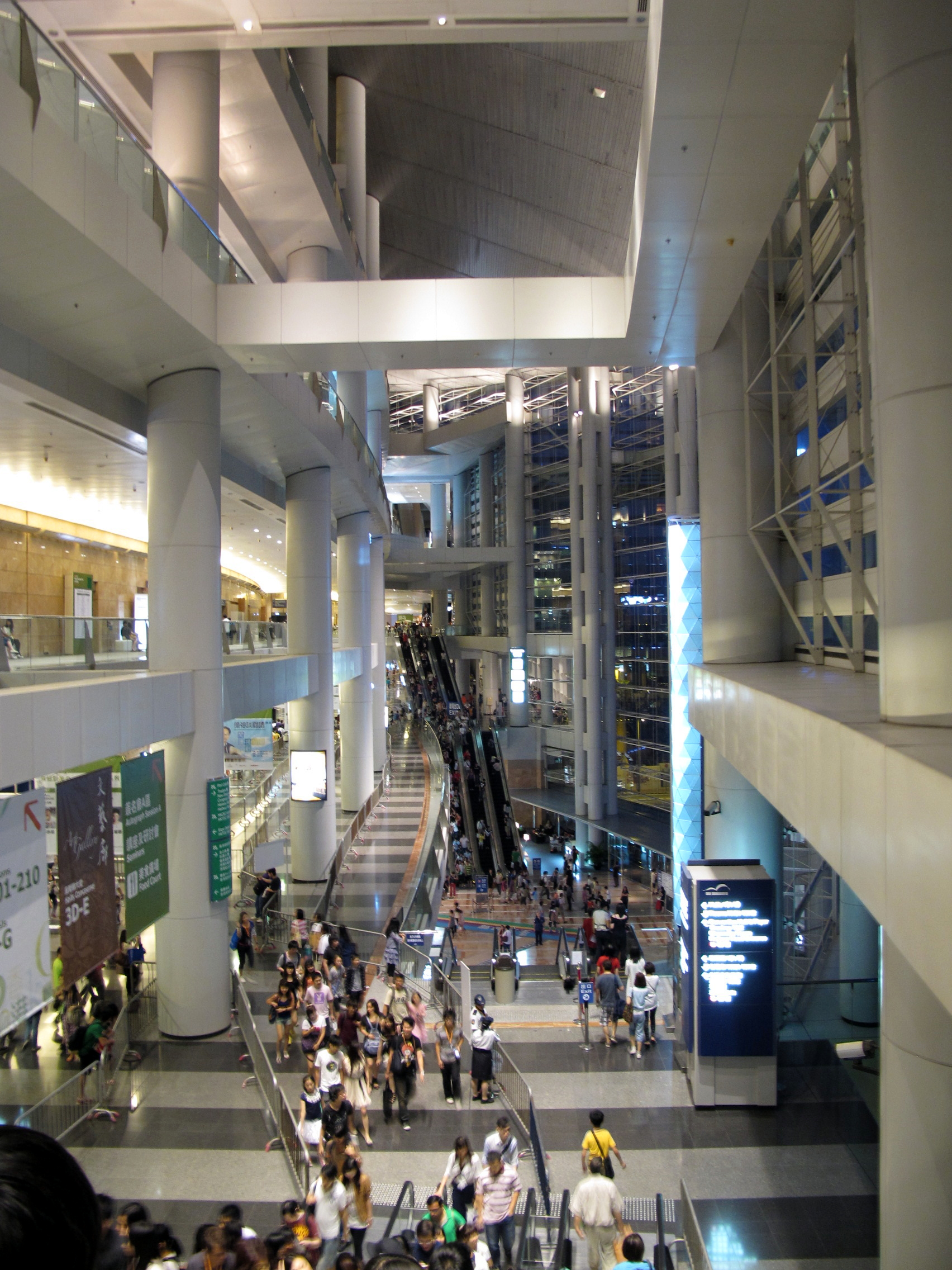
Interior of Phase 2 of the Centre in July 2011

The Hong Kong Convention and Exhibition Centre (HKCEC) is one of the two major convention and exhibition venues in Hong Kong, along with AsiaWorld–Expo. It is located in Wan Chai North, Hong Kong Island. Built along the Victoria Harbour, it is linked by covered walkways to nearby hotels and commercial buildings. The venue was designed by Skidmore, Owings & Merrill LLP, in association with Wong & Ouyang (HK) Ltd. Larry Oltmanns led the design as the Design Partner with SOM.

== Construction ==
The original building was built on reclaimed land off Gloucester Road in 1988. The glass curtain was the world's largest at the time, overlooking the Victoria Harbour on three sides.

The second phase of the centre, located on an artificial island, was constructed from 1994 to 1997, and features a bird-like rooftop (also referred to as a turtle by some critics). The project took 48 months from reclamation to completion. The main constructor of the extension was a joint venture named Hip Hing Construction Co Ltd Dragages et Travaux Publics. Originally, Phase Two was connected to Phase One with an atrium link (a sky bridge), and to Convention Road with two road bridges, but now the two phases are connected by an expanded exhibition hall.

The complex's construction was financed by New World Development, with the Renaissance Harbour View Hotel, Grand Hyatt Hong Kong and Harbour View Apartments being built on top of it.

HKCEC made a second expansion during 2006–2009. Upon completion, the HK$1.4 billion expansion added 19,400 square metres (209,000 sq ft) to the HKCEC, bringing the total exhibition space to nearly 83,000 square metres (890,000 sq ft) and total rentable function space to over 92,000 square metres (990,000 sq ft).

== Management ==
The Hong Kong Convention and Exhibition Centre (Management) Limited, a wholly owned subsidiary of NWS Holdings (新創建集團有限公司), is contracted by the HKTDC for the day-to-day management and operation of the HKCEC. The 850 member staff's responsibilities include administration, marketing, booking, scheduling, event co-ordination, maintenance, security and food and beverage operations. The latter including banqueting, and managing the centre's restaurants. The managing director of the company is Monica Lee-Müller.

== Convention facilities and statistics ==
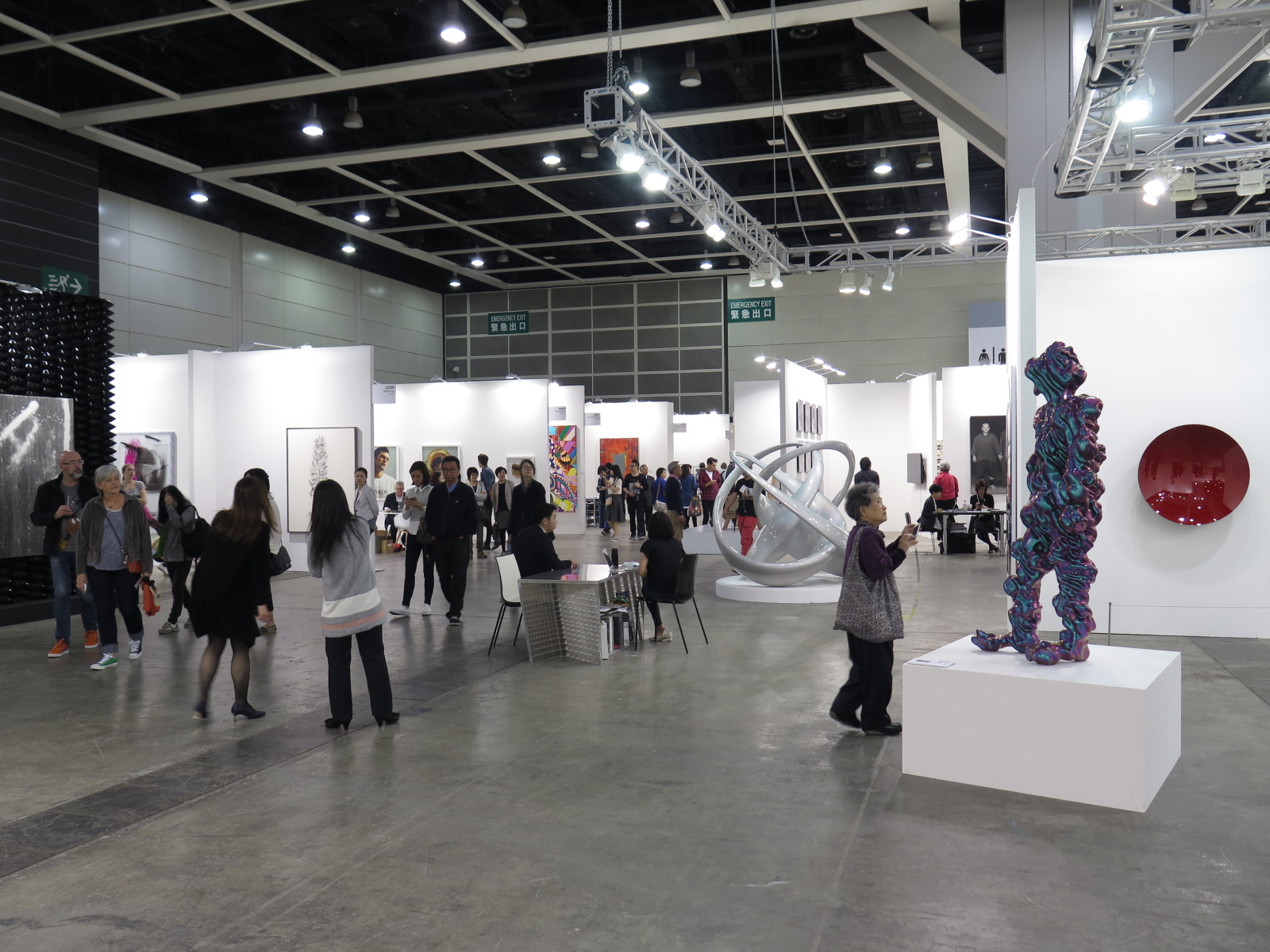
Art Basel Exhibition in the Centre in March 2015

- 5 exhibition halls: 53,292 m^{2} (573,630 sq ft)
- 2 convention halls: 5,699 m^{2} (61,340 sq ft); total seating for 6,100
- 2 theatres: 800 m^{2} (8,600 sq ft); total seating for 1,000
- 52 meeting rooms: 6,004 m^{2} (64,630 sq ft)
- Pre-function areas: 8,000 m^{2} (86,000 sq ft)
- 7 restaurants: total seating for 1,870
- Business centre: 150 m^{2} (1,600 sq ft)
- Carpark spaces parking: for 1,300 cars and 60 vans
- Total available rental space: 92,061 m^{2} (990,940 sq ft)
- Capacity: 140,000 visitors per day

The HKCEC has facilities for video-conferencing, teleconferencing, satellite links, simultaneous interpretation in up to eight languages, audio-visual equipment, foyer registration space, and event signage.

== Functions held at the site ==
Numerous functions are held at the HKCEC each year, including exhibitions, conventions/meetings, banquets, the Hong Kong Food Expo, Hong Kong Food Festival, the Hong Kong Book Fair, the Hong Kong Optical Fair, Hong Kong Fashion Week for Fall/Winter and other special events.

Other events include Art Basel Hong Kong, Comic Con and Animation-Comic-Game Hong Kong

The centre hosts more than 45 international trade fairs for buyers from more than 100 countries each year, including the world's largest leather fair and watch and clock fair. The regular international fairs for giftware, toys, fashion, jewellery, electronics and optical products are Asia's largest.

In addition, HKCEC hosts the annual film expo CineAsia where all major Hollywood studios present their upcoming productions to the Asian theatrical industry.

It also served as the site of the 1997 Hong Kong handover ceremony, which signified the end of British colonial rule.

The Sixth WTO Ministerial Conference took place at the HKCEC from 13–18 December 2005. The NGO Centre was located at "Phase I" of the centre. This is the first time a WTO Ministerial Conference and the NGO Centre was located under the same roof as the Conference proceedings.

Since 2013, a huge countdown clock was installed at facade of HKCEC to celebrate the New Year's Eve with fireworks and light show and was held ever since.

In May 2023, the HKCEC cancelled an event planned by pro-democracy singer Anthony Wong, after initially approving it.

== Access ==
Located on the north shore of Hong Kong Island, the HKCEC is easily accessible via the Star Ferry service, whose Wan Chai Pier is situated just east of the main building and operates from the HKCEC across Victoria Harbour to Tsim Sha Tsui Pier, adjacent to the Cultural Centre.

Exhibition Centre station on the cross-harbour section of the East Rail line and the proposed North Island line is directly located under the HKCEC. Wan Chai station on the Island line of the MTR is within walking distance and is linked to the HKCEC via a pedestrian bridge over O'Brien Road.

In addition, the HKCEC is served by numerous franchised bus routes operated by Citybus, including several cross-harbour routes operated jointly with Kowloon Motor Bus.

== In popular culture ==
- The structure played a major part in the film Transformers: Age of Extinction, where a Decepticon ship is seen destroying the structure from above.

== See also ==
- Golden Bauhinia Square
- Hong Kong Trade Development Council (and HKTDC Trade Fairs)
- Wan Chai

Preceded by Royal Albert Hall	Miss World Venues; 1989	Succeeded by London Palladium
Preceded by Shenzhen Guesthouse Hotel	Home of the Provisional Legislative Council of Hong Kong; 1 July 1997	Succeeded by Legislative Council Building
