= Hong Kong Trade Development Council =

Statutory body

- 香港貿易發展局

Agency overview
- Formed: 1966; 60 years ago
- Headquarters: 38/F, Office Tower, Convention Plaza, 1 Harbour Road, Wan Chai, Hong Kong
- Agency executives: Frederick S Ma, Chairman; Sophia Chong, Executive Director
- Website: hktdc.com

Hong Kong Trade Development Council
- Traditional Chinese: 香港貿易發展局
Transcriptions
Yue: Cantonese
- Yale Romanization: Hēung góng mauh yihk faat jín gúk
- Jyutping: Hoeng1 gong2 mau6 yik6 faat3 zin2 guk2

HKTDC
- Traditional Chinese: 貿發局
Transcriptions
Yue: Cantonese
- Yale Romanization: Mauh faat gúk
- Jyutping: Mau6 faat3 guk2

The Hong Kong Trade Development Council (HKTDC) is a statutory body established in 1966 for international marketing dedicated to creating opportunities for Hong Kong's businesses. The organisation has 51 offices around the world, including 13 in Mainland China. With close to 60 years of experience, its mission is to explore opportunities for Hong Kong companies, especially small and medium-sized enterprises (SMEs), and connect them with business partners around the world.

== Governance ==
The HKTDC is governed by a 19-member Council of Hong Kong business leaders and senior government officials. It plans and supervises the organisation's global operations, services and promotional activities. The council also oversees the operation of the Hong Kong Convention and Exhibition Centre.

Frederick Ma is the eleventh HKTDC Chairman since the council's establishment. He started his term as chairman on 1 June 2025. On 1 October 2025, Sophia Chong succeeded Margaret Fong as the executive director of the HKTDC. Ms Chong is responsible for the HKTDC's worldwide operations.

== Lobbying ==
Hong Kong Free Press revealed that HKTDC paid around HKD $84,000,000 from 2014 to 2020 to US lobbying firms, on behalf of the Hong Kong government, in an attempt to convince US politicians to object to the Hong Kong Human Rights and Democracy Act.

== Trade Fairs ==
The HKTDC also organises more than 40 fairs each year. Nine of these fairs are the biggest of their kind in Asia, while three are the world's largest, namely, the HKTDC Hong Kong Gifts & Premium Fair, the HKTDC Hong Kong Watch & Clock Fair and the HKTDC Hong Kong Electronics Fair (Autumn Edition).

== HKTDC Online Marketplace ==
HKTDC operates an online marketplace "hktdc.com" of 30 industries connecting more than 2 million global buyers with over 130,000 quality Hong Kong, China and Asia wholesale suppliers and manufacturers. With more than 50 years of experience in buyer-supplier matching, the hktdc.com facilitates worldwide buyers to source products and services from verified, quality suppliers and manufacturers.

== Global Presence ==
The HKTDC is headquartered in Hong Kong. As of 2018, it has around 50 offices which span six continents. In addition to its headquarters its operations comprise 13 offices across mainland China as well locations throughout the Asia Pacific, including Taipei, India, Japan and Australia.

Beyond Asia, offices include: North American locations such as New York City and Toronto, plus Latin America, 11 European cities, and premises in South Africa and the Middle East.

The offices have various functions. They act as "a window for Hong Kong to the outside world", as two-way links between the relevant country or region, provide assistance for companies or individuals interested in doing business with Hong Kong, and as a liaison between the SAR Government and governments of the relevant country. Their work has had a significant effect in enhancing the international profile of Hong Kong.

== See also ==
- Hong Kong International Wine & Spirits Fair
- Taiwan External Trade Development Council
