= António Guterres =

Secretary-General of the United Nations since 2017

His Excellency António Guterres GCC GCL
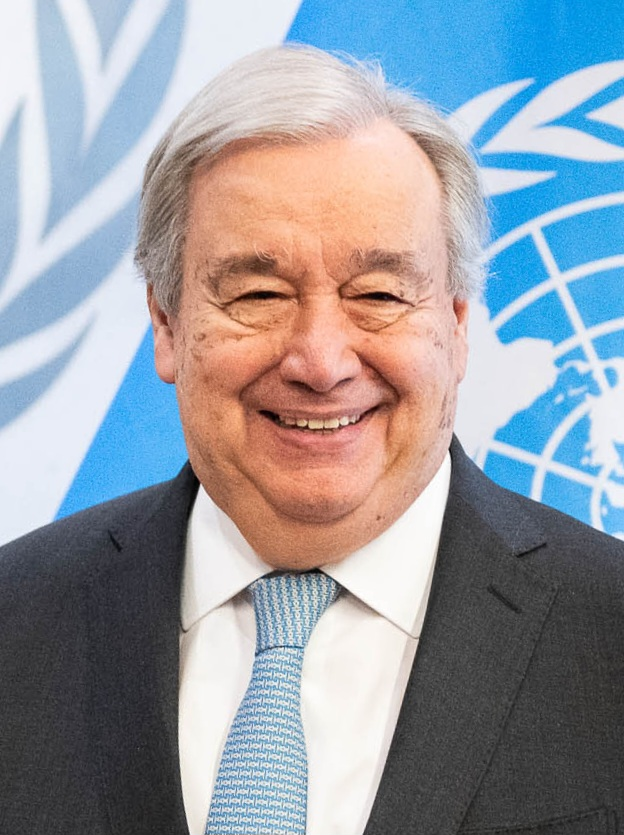
- Guterres in 2025

9th Secretary-General of the United Nations
- Incumbent
- Assumed office 1 January 2017
- Deputy: Amina J. Mohammed
- Preceded by: Ban Ki-moon

Prime Minister of Portugal
- In office 28 October 1995 – 6 April 2002
- President: Mário Soares; Jorge Sampaio
- Preceded by: Aníbal Cavaco Silva
- Succeeded by: José Manuel Barroso

United Nations High Commissioner for Refugees
- In office 15 June 2005 – 31 December 2015
- Secretary-General: Kofi Annan; Ban Ki-moon
- Preceded by: Ruud Lubbers
- Succeeded by: Filippo Grandi

President of the Socialist International
- In office 10 November 1999 – 15 June 2005
- Secretary-General: Luis Ayala
- Preceded by: Pierre Mauroy
- Succeeded by: George Papandreou

Secretary-General of the Socialist Party
- In office 23 February 1992 – 21 January 2002
- President: António de Almeida Santos
- Preceded by: Jorge Sampaio
- Succeeded by: Eduardo Ferro Rodrigues

Leader of the Opposition
- In office 23 February 1992 – 28 October 1995
- Prime Minister: Aníbal Cavaco Silva
- Preceded by: Jorge Sampaio
- Succeeded by: Fernando Nogueira

Member of the Assembly of the Republic
- In office 3 June 1976 – 4 April 2002
- Constituency: Castelo Branco

Personal details
- Born: António Manuel de Oliveira Guterres; 30 April 1949 (age 77) Santos-o-Velho, Lisbon, Portugal
- Citizenship: Portugal; Timor-Leste
- Party: Socialist
- Spouses: Luísa Guimarães e Melo (m. 1972; died 1998); Catarina Vaz Pinto (m. 2001)
- Children: 2
- Education: University of Lisbon (B.Eng)
- Website: www.antonioguterres.gov.pt

António Manuel de Oliveira Guterres (Note: This name uses Portuguese naming customs: the first or maternal family name is Oliveira and the second or paternal family name is Guterres.) (Note: English pronunciation: /ɡʊˈtɛrəs/ guu-TERR-əs, European Portuguese pronunciation: [ɐ̃ˈtɔni.u mɐnuˈɛl dɨ ɔliˈvɐjɾɐ ɣuˈtɛʁɨʃ, ɐ̃ˈtɔnju -].) (born 30 April 1949) is a Portuguese politician and diplomat who, since 2017, has served as the ninth secretary-general of the United Nations. A member of the Portuguese Socialist Party, Guterres served as the prime minister of Portugal from 1995 to 2002.

Born in Lisbon, Guterres studied physics and electrical engineering at Lisbon's Instituto Superior Técnico, briefly taught systems theory and telecommunications, and became involved in politics while active in a Catholic youth group. Guterres served as secretary-general of the Socialist Party from 1992 to 2002. He was elected prime minister in 1995. He led the party to legislative victories in 1995 and 1999. Guterres announced his resignation as Socialist Party leader in 2002 following the party's losses in the 2001 local elections, with Eduardo Ferro Rodrigues succeeding him while he remained prime minister until losing the subsequent general election to José Manuel Barroso's Social Democratic Party. Despite this defeat, polling of the Portuguese public in both 2012 and 2014 ranked Guterres the best prime minister of the previous 30 years.

Guterres served as President of the Socialist International from 1999 to 2005. He was the United Nations High Commissioner for Refugees from 2005 to 2015. He reformed the agency and addressed multiple global refugee crises. Guterres was elected secretary-general in October 2016, succeeding Ban Ki-moon at the beginning of the following year and becoming the first European to hold this office since Kurt Waldheim in 1981. As secretary-general, he has focused on peace, human rights, climate change, refugee protection, and diplomatic engagement with controversial global actors.

Guterres has held numerous advisory, board, and leadership roles in international organizations, foundations, and councils spanning journalism, finance, humanitarian aid, innovation, gender equality, and global policy. Guterres, a multilingual practicing Catholic, was married twice and has two children. He has received numerous national and international honors, honorary doctorates, and prestigious awards recognizing contributions to diplomacy, democracy and global leadership.

== Early life, education, and early career ==
António Manuel de Oliveira Guterres was born on 30 April 1949, in the parish of Santos-o-Velho in Lisbon, the son of Virgílio Dias Guterres and Ilda Cândida dos Reis Oliveira Guterres.

Guterres attended the Camões Lyceum (now Camões Secondary School), where he graduated in 1965, winning the National Lyceums Award (Prémio Nacional dos Liceus) as the best student in the country. He studied physics and electrical engineering at Instituto Superior Técnico – Technical University of Lisbon. He graduated in 1971 and started an academic career as an assistant professor teaching systems theory and telecommunications signals, before leaving academic life to start a political career. During his university years, he joined the Grupo da Luz, a club for young Roman Catholics, where he met Father Vítor Melícias, a prominent Franciscan priest and church administrator who remains a close friend and confidant.

== Political career ==
Guterres's political career began in 1974, when he became a member of the Socialist Party. Shortly thereafter, he quit academic life and became a full-time politician. In the period following the Carnation Revolution of 25 April 1974 that put an end to Caetano's dictatorship, Guterres became involved in Socialist Party leadership and held the following offices:

- Head of Office of the Secretary of State of Industry (1974 and 1975)
- Deputy for Castelo Branco in the Portuguese National Parliament (1976–2002)
- Leader of the parliamentary bench of the Socialist Party, succeeding Jorge Sampaio (1989–1990)

Guterres was a member of the team that negotiated the terms of Portugal's entry into the European Union in the late 1970s. He was a founding member of the Portuguese Refugee Council in 1991.

In 1992, after the Socialists' third consecutive defeat in Parliamentary elections, Guterres became secretary-general of the Socialist Party and leader of the opposition during Aníbal Cavaco Silva's government. At the time, he was the party's third leader in six years. His election represented a break with tradition for the Socialists: not only was Guterres not associated with either the faction around then-president and former prime minister Mário Soares or the party's left wing led by Guterres's predecessor Sampaio, but he was also a devout Catholic, running counter to the party's historical secularism. He consulted with Portugal's civil society in formulating policy, meeting a range of intellectuals, scientists and entrepreneurs from across the country and the political spectrum in the run-up to the next general election.

Guterres was elected to a four-year term as one of the 25 vice presidents of the Socialist International in September 1992.

=== Prime minister of Portugal ===
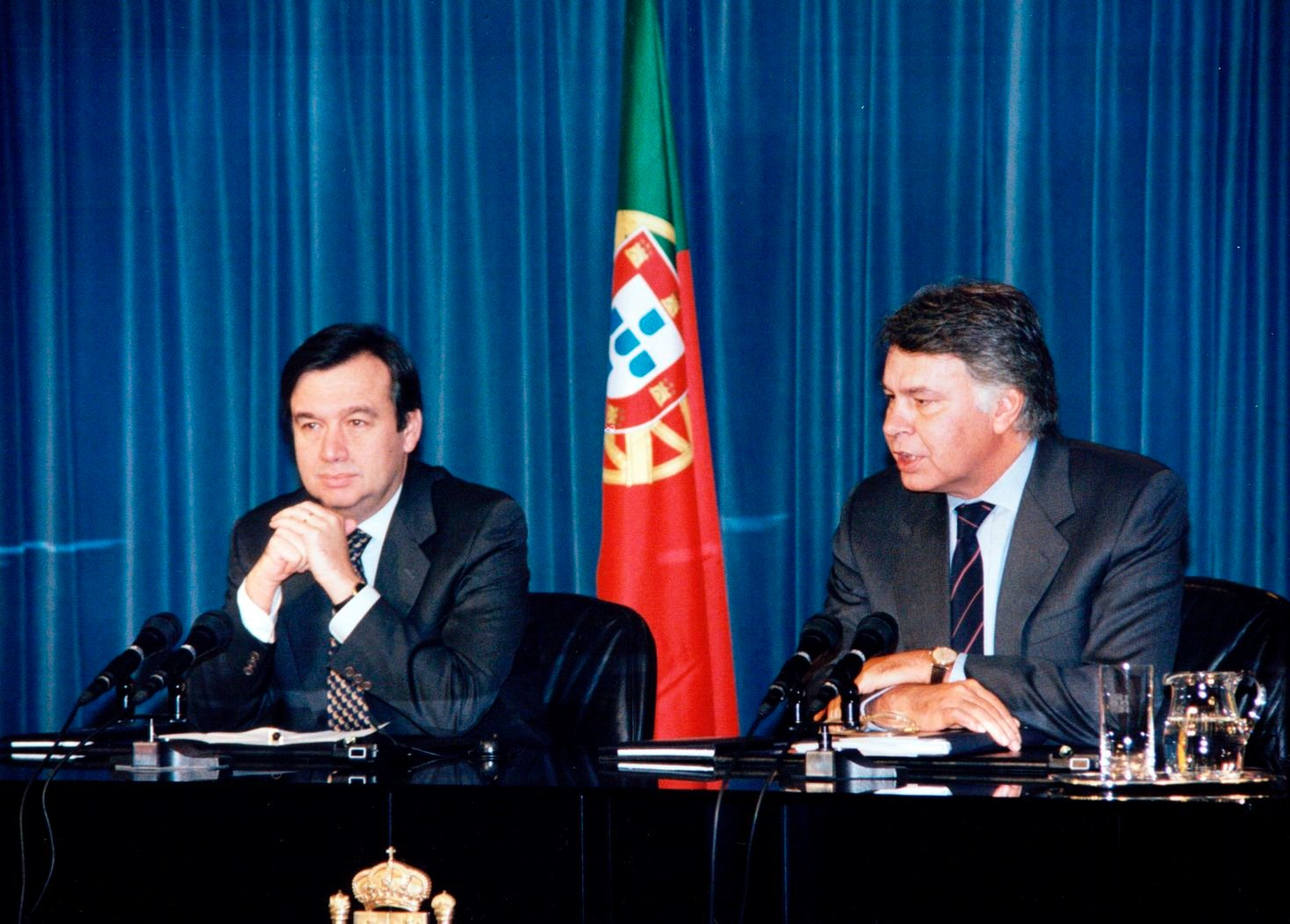
Guterres and Prime Minister of Spain Felipe González, in January 1996

Aníbal Cavaco Silva did not seek a fourth term as prime minister of Portugal (in order to run for the 1996 presidential election) and the Socialist Party won the 1995 parliamentary election. President Soares appointed Guterres as prime minister and his cabinet took the oath of office on 28 October that year.

Guterres ran on a platform of keeping a tight hold on budget spending and inflation in a bid to ensure that Portugal met the Euro convergence criteria by the end of the decade, as well as increasing rates of participation in the labor market, especially among women, improving tax collection and cracking down on tax evasion, increased involvement of the mutual and nonprofit sectors in providing welfare services, a means-tested guaranteed minimum income (known as the Rendimento Mínimo Garantido), and increased investment in education. During his time as prime minister, various reforms were carried out in areas such as education, housing, social welfare, healthcare, health and safety, sex discrimination, and family leave.

He was then one of seven social democratic prime ministers and two social democratic parties in coalitions in Western Europe, joining political allies in Spain, Denmark, Finland, Sweden, Greece and the Netherlands. Social democratic parties were also in coalitions in Ireland and Luxembourg.

==== First term (1995–1999) ====
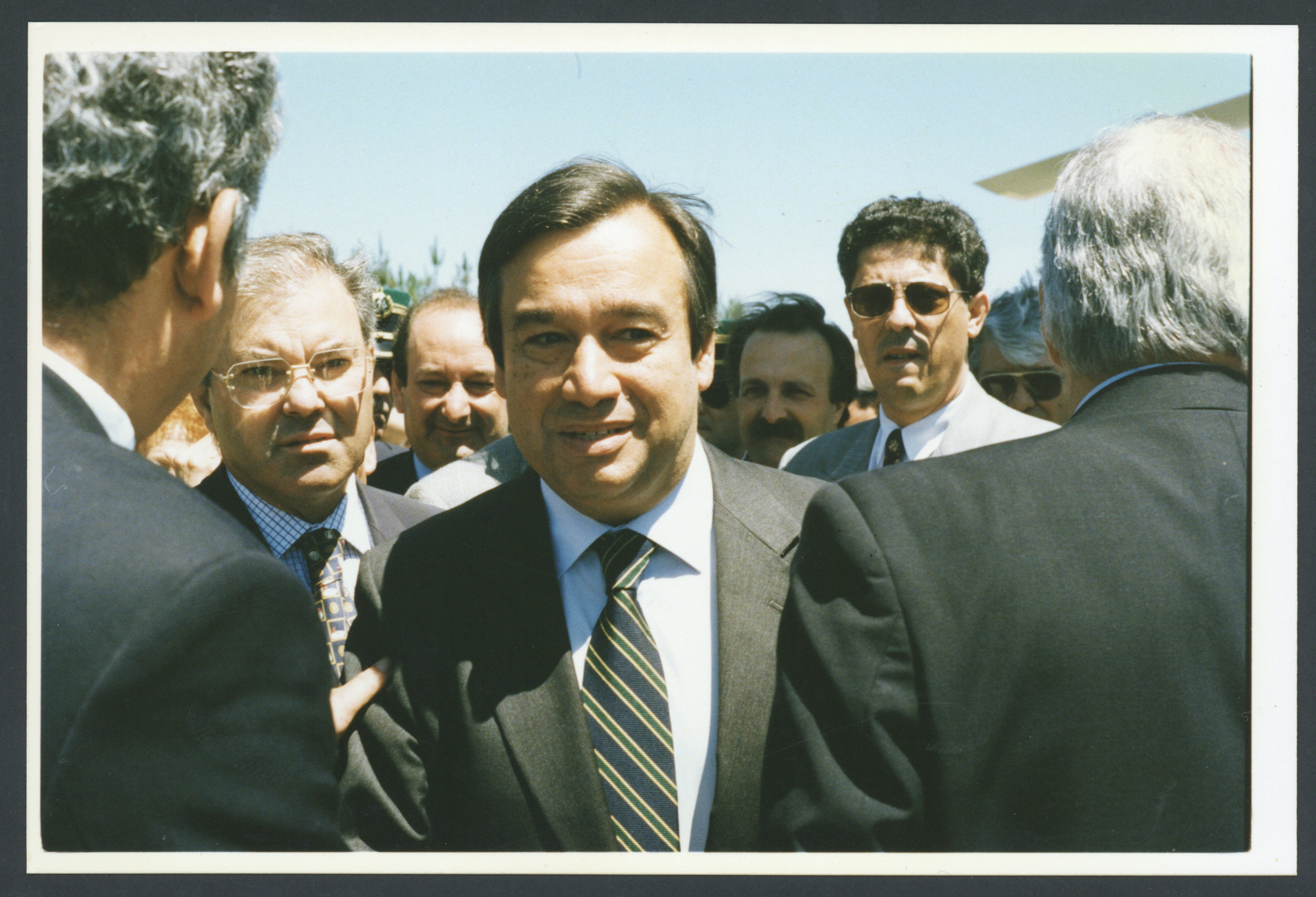
Guterres, in June 1996

With a style markedly different from that of his predecessor, and based on dialogue and discussion with all sections of society, Guterres was a popular prime minister in his first years in office. Portugal was enjoying an economic expansion that allowed the Socialists to reduce budget deficits while increasing welfare spending and creating new conditional cash transfer programs. His government also accelerated the program of privatizations that Cavaco Silva's government had begun: 29 companies were privatized between 1996 and 1999, with proceeds from privatizations in 1996–97 greater than those of the previous six years, and the public sector's share of GDP halved from 11% in 1994 to 5.5% five years later. Share ownership was also widened, with 800,000 people investing in Portugal Telecom upon its privatization in 1996 and 750,000 applying for shares in Electricidade de Portugal.

In 1998, Guterres presided over Expo 98 in Lisbon, commemorating the 500th anniversary of the voyage of Vasco da Gama. Also in 1998, two nationwide referendums were held. The first one was held in June and asked voters whether abortion rules should be liberalized. The Socialist Party split over the issue of liberalization, and Guterres led the anti-abortion side, which eventually won the referendum. A second referendum was held in November, this time over the regionalization of the mainland. Both Guterres and his party supported such an administrative reform, but the voters rejected it.

Contrary to his party's stance and following the removal of homosexuality from the list of mental illnesses by the World Health Organization in 1990, Guterres said, in 1995, that "he did not like homosexuality" and that it was "something that bothered him".

On foreign policy, Guterres campaigned for United Nations intervention in East Timor in 1999, after it was virtually destroyed by Indonesian-backed militias when it voted for independence. He also finalized the 12-year negotiations on the transfer of sovereignty over Macau, which had been a Portuguese colony, to Chinese control in 1999.

==== Second term (1999–2002) ====
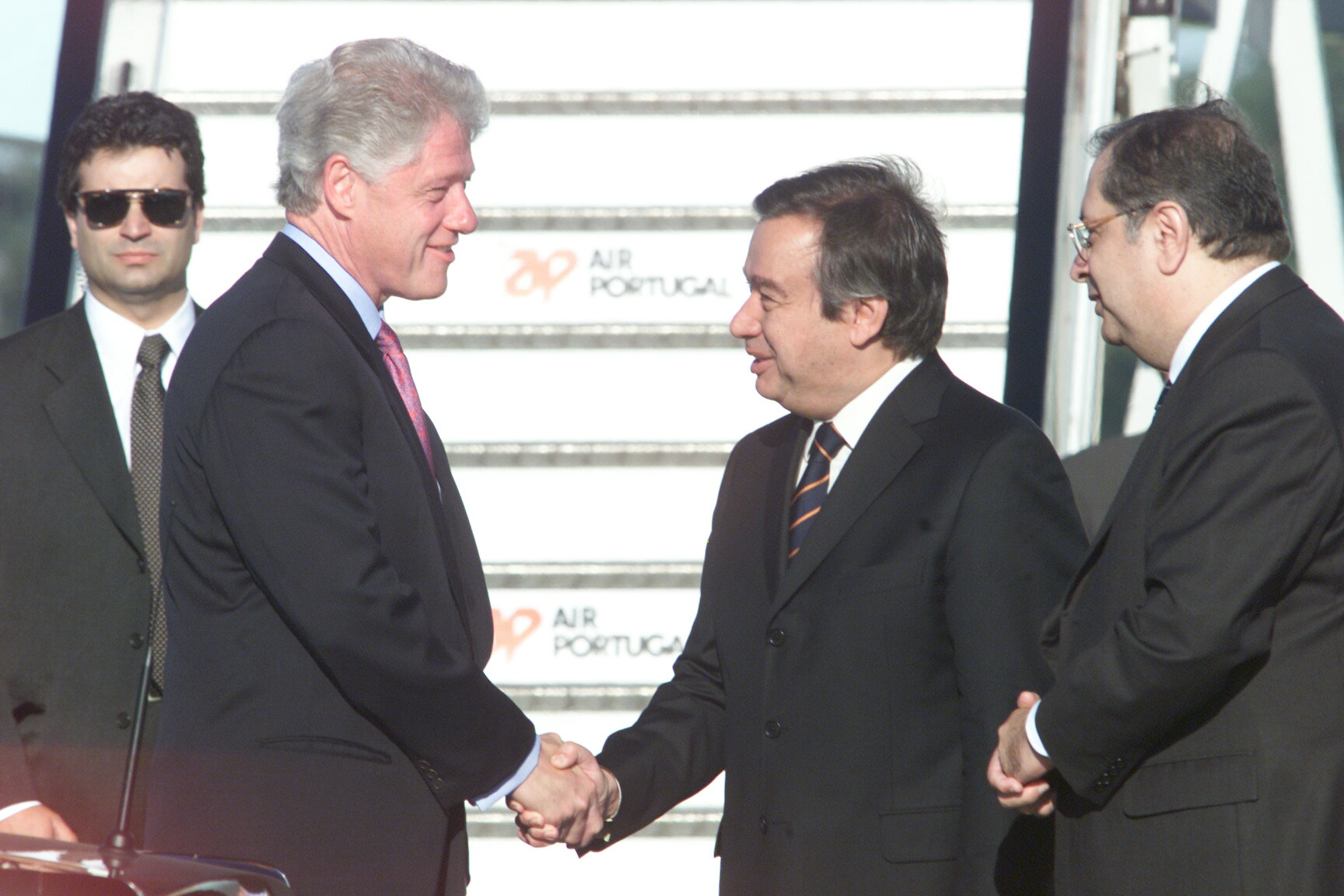
Guterres with Bill Clinton, in May 2000

In the 1999 parliamentary election the Socialist Party and the opposition won exactly the same number of seats (115). Guterres was reappointed to office and from January to July 2000 occupied the six-month rotating presidency of the European Council. His second term in government was not as successful, however. Internal party conflicts, an economic slowdown, and the Hintze Ribeiro Bridge disaster damaged his authority and popularity. Nevertheless, some long-lasting measures were taken during his second term: in October 2000, the Parliament approved the decriminalization of drug use (effective 1 July 2001) and in March 2001, same-sex civil unions were legalized.

In December 2001, following a disastrous defeat for the Socialist Party in local elections, Guterres resigned to "prevent the country from falling into a political swamp." President Jorge Sampaio dissolved Parliament and called for elections. Eduardo Ferro Rodrigues, until then minister for social security, assumed the Socialist Party leadership, but the general election was lost to the Social Democratic Party of José Manuel Durão Barroso, who later became president of the European Commission.

=== President of Socialist International ===
Guterres was elected president of Socialist International in November 1999, overlapping with his second term as prime minister of Portugal until his resignation from the latter post in December 2001. He remained president of the Socialist International until June 2005.

== Diplomatic career ==
In 2005, following Guterres's proposal, George Papandreou was elected vice president of the Socialist International; in 2006, Papandreou succeeded him as president of the Socialist International.

In May 2005, Guterres was elected High Commissioner for Refugees for a five-year term by the UN General Assembly, replacing Ruud Lubbers.

=== High Commissioner for Refugees ===
As High Commissioner, Guterres headed one of the world's largest humanitarian organizations, which at the end of his term had more than 10,000 staff working in 126 countries providing protection and assistance to over 60 million refugees, returnees, internally displaced people and stateless persons. His time in office was marked by a fundamental organizational reform, cutting staff and administrative costs in the UNHCR's Geneva head office and expanding UNHCR's emergency response capacity during the worst displacement crisis since the Second World War.

From 19 to 23 March 2006, Guterres visited Beijing, China, and expressed his objection to repatriation of North Korean refugees by the Chinese government.

In a February 2007 NPR interview devoted mainly to the plight of Iraqi refugees, Guterres said that this was one of the greatest refugee crises in the Middle East since 1948. Among poorly publicized refugee crises, he cited those in the Central African Republic and the Democratic Republic of the Congo. During his final years as High Commissioner, he worked chiefly to secure international aid for the refugees of the Syrian civil war, calling the refugee crisis an "existential" one for host countries (such as Lebanon and Jordan), and calling additional aid a "matter of survival" for the refugees. He was an outspoken advocate for a more coordinated and humane approach by European countries to the Mediterranean refugee crisis. In June 2013, he launched a US$5 billion aid effort, its biggest ever, to help up to 10.25 million Syrians that year.

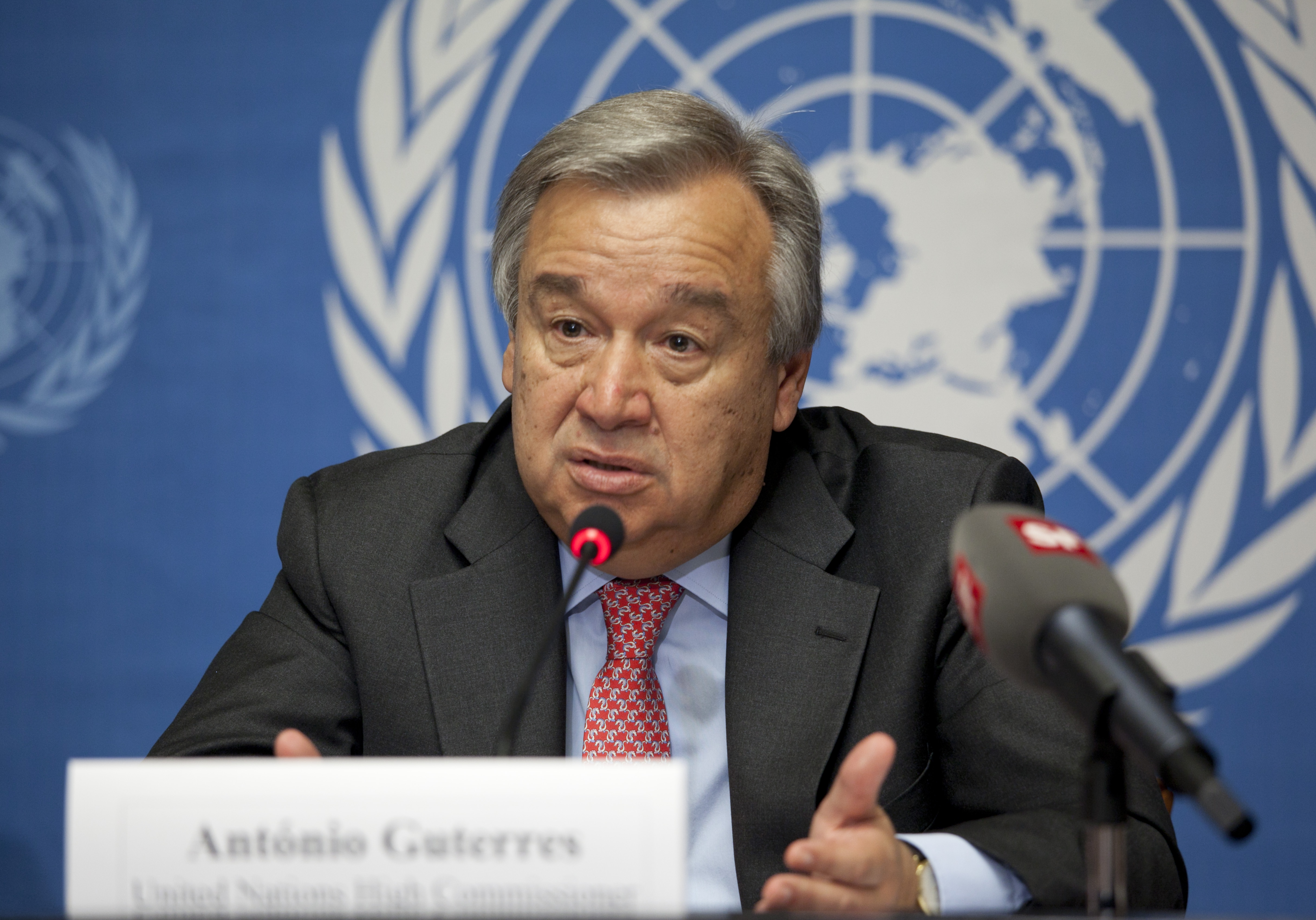
Guterres speaking in August 2012

In what was widely considered a very effective PR move, Guterres appointed American actress Angelina Jolie as his special envoy to represent UNHCR and himself at the diplomatic level in 2012. Together they visited the Kilis Oncupinar Accommodation Facility in Turkey (2012); the Zaatari refugee camp in Jordan (2013); and the Maritime Squadron of the Armed Forces of Malta (2015). They also appeared jointly before the United Nations Security Council (2015).

In early 2015, the General Assembly voted to extend Guterres's mandate by 6 1/2 months to 31 December, on recommendation of United Nations Secretary-General Ban Ki-moon. In light of the European migrant crisis, the UNHCR's 98-member executive committee (EXCOM) later requested that Ban recommend extending Guterres's term by another year, but Ban disregarded the request. Guterres left office on 31 December 2015, having served the second-longest term as High Commissioner in the organization's history, after Prince Sadruddin Aga Khan.

In 2015, President Marcelo Rebelo de Sousa appointed Guterres to serve as a Member of the Council of State of Portugal; he resigned after being appointed as the UN's 9th secretary-general.

=== United Nations secretary-general ===
==== Candidacy ====
Guterres became United Nations Secretary-General on 1 January 2017, following his formal election by the UN General Assembly on 13 October 2016.

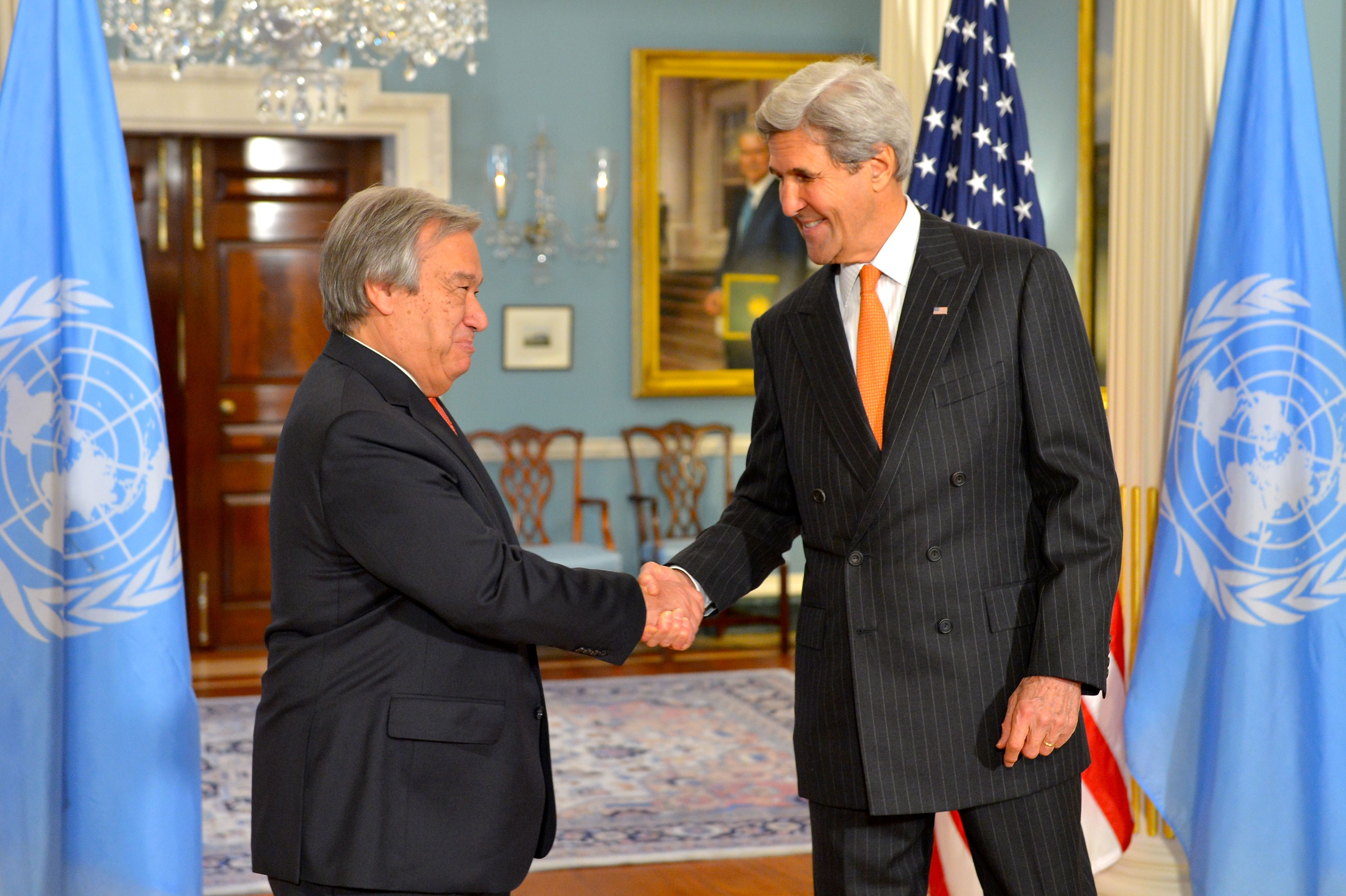
Guterres and U.S. Secretary of State John Kerry shake hands, 4 November 2016.

On 29 February 2016, Guterres submitted his nomination as Portugal's candidate for the 2016 UN secretary-general selection. This was the first time candidates for secretary-general had to present their platform in public hearings in the UN General Assembly, a process during which Guterres emerged as a much stronger candidate than had been initially expected, given that he fit the bill on neither the gender nor the geographic scores.

On 5 October, the 15-member United Nations Security Council announced that it had agreed to nominate Guterres, after an informal secret ballot in which he gained 13 "encourage" votes and two "no opinion" votes. The Security Council officially nominated Guterres in a formal resolution on 6 October. A week later, he was formally elected by the United Nations General Assembly in its 71st session. Guterres took office on 1 January 2017. Guterres is the first national leader to become the U.N. Secretary-General.

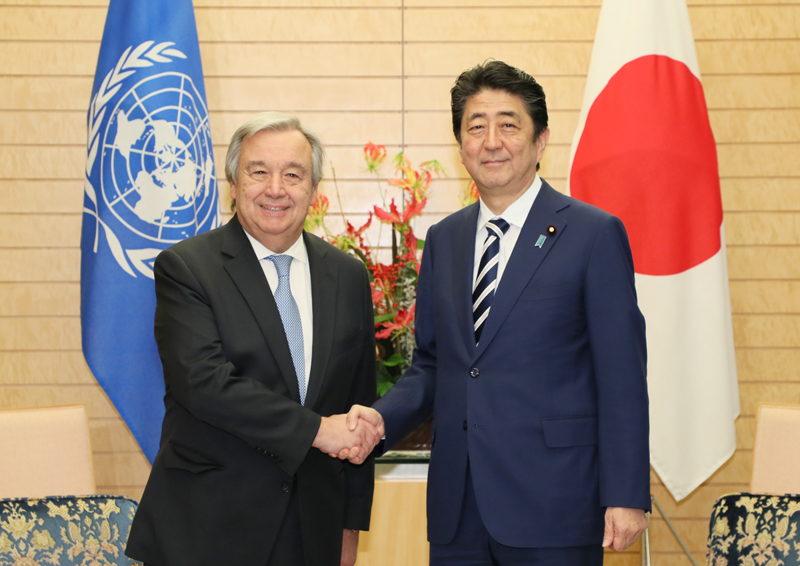
Guterres with Japanese Prime Minister Shinzō Abe in Tokyo, Japan, 14 December 2017

The UN's role in the Haiti cholera outbreak was widely discussed and criticized after the Ban Ki-moon administration denied the issue for several months. According to the Boston-based Institute for Justice & Democracy in Haiti as well as numerous conclusive scientific studies, the UN is the proximate cause for bringing cholera to Haiti. Peacekeepers sent to Haiti from Nepal in 2010 were carrying asymptomatic cholera and failed to treat their waste properly before dumping it into one of Haiti's main water streams. During his UNSG informal dialogue, Jamaica, on behalf of the Caribbean Community, asked if the UN should assume liability for any deaths within local populations that result from the introduction of infectious disease by its peacekeepers. Jamaica also asked if Guterres believed compensation should be provided. Guterres responded by calling the situation a "particularly complex question", saying it was difficult to preserve diplomatic immunity while also ensuring there is no impunity, but that he would "pay a lot of attention in trying to find the right equilibrium between these two aspects that are absolutely crucial." In a UN General Assembly meeting in late October 2016, the representative from Haiti called the UN's current and future response to the cholera epidemic "a litmus test of the system's commitment to the promotion of human rights". Though many had hoped Guterres's term would mark a break with the inaction that characterized Ban's response to the epidemic, Guterres has done little to signal a commitment to Haitian cholera victims. As of April 2017, five months into his term as secretary-general, only $10 million had been contributed to the $400 million fund to fight cholera and provide material assistance to victims the UN announced in 2016.

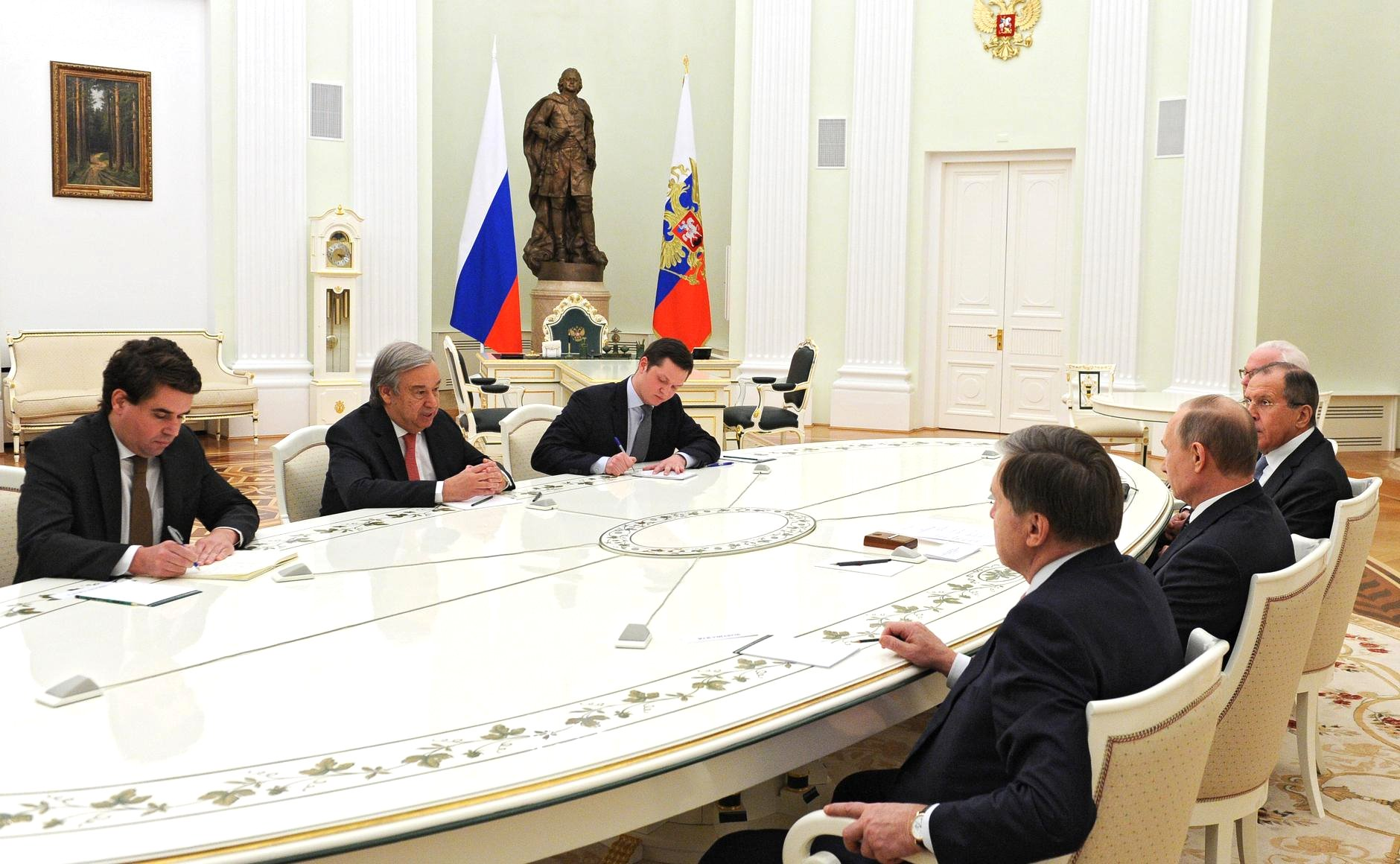
Guterres with Russian President Vladimir Putin and Foreign Minister Sergey Lavrov, 24 November 2016

In 2016, Anders Kompass exposed the sexual assault of children by peacekeepers in the Central African Republic and, as a consequence, was dismissed by Ban's administration before being rehabilitated in court. During the United Nations Secretary-General Candidate informal dialogues, Guterres indicated it was completely unacceptable that there be UN forces committing human rights violations such as rape and sexual violence. "All of us together—states and UN—must do our utmost to ensure that any kind of action of this type is severely punished," he said. The United States raised the question of international tribunals to try peacekeepers for their crimes. Guterres responded by saying an independent jurisdiction would be excellent but that "the only way to get there is through a new compact with all key parties—true contributors, financial contributors—and to make sure that there is an adjustment in the relation between countries, the UN, and the support those that are contributing with troops receive, in order to be able to do it much better."

==== First term ====
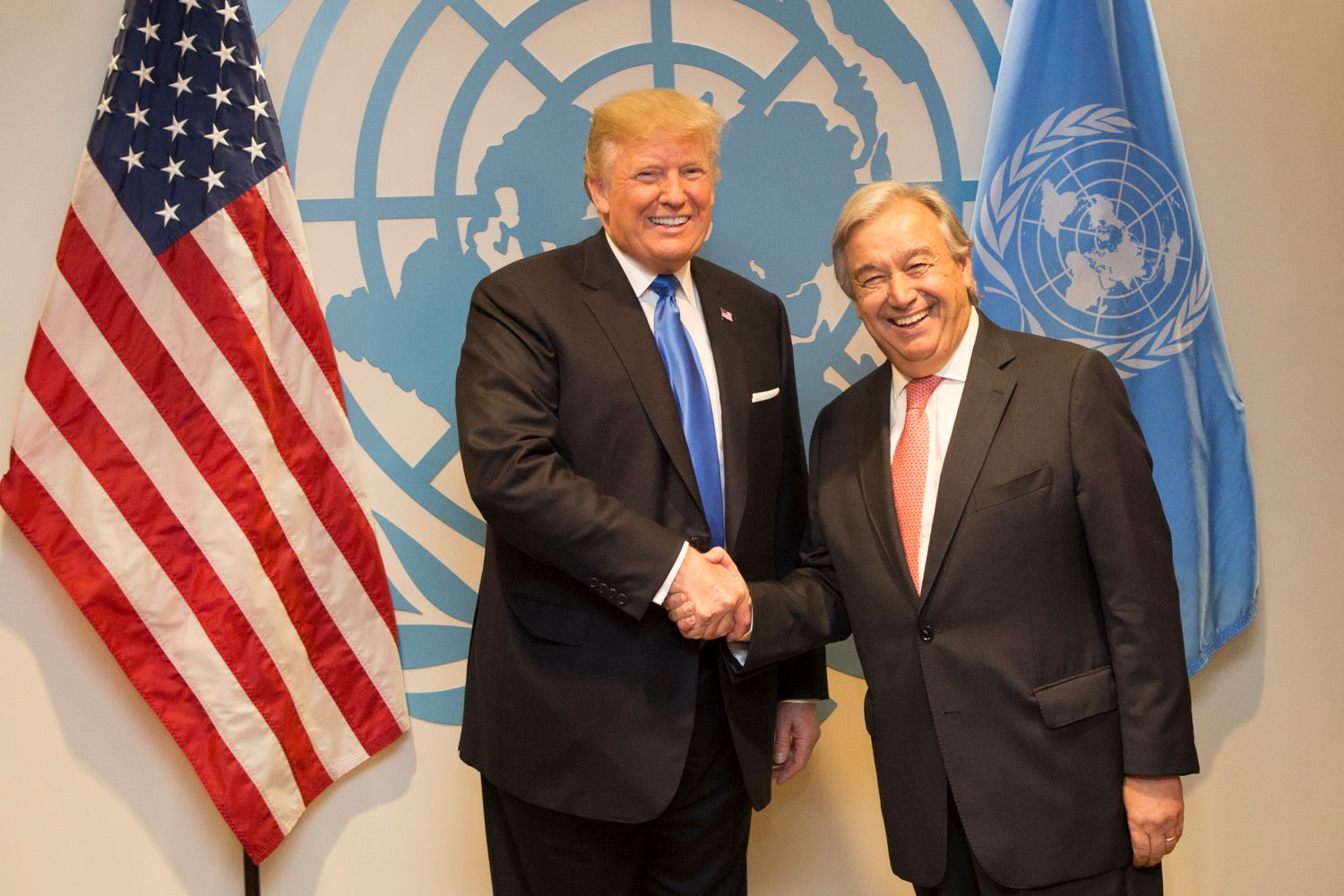
Guterres with U.S. President Donald Trump, 2 October 2017

Guterres speaking about artificial intelligence and climate change at the 2024 World Economic Forum

On 1 January 2017, on his first day as secretary-general of the United Nations, Guterres pledged to make 2017 a year for peace. "Let us resolve to put peace first," he said. On 12 April 2017, Guterres appointed an eight-member independent panel to assess and enhance the effectiveness of UN-Habitat after the adoption of the New Urban Agenda. The panel's recommendation to establish an independent coordinating mechanism, 'UN-Urban', met with criticism from urban experts and the African Urban Institute. On 20 June 2017, "Secretary-General António Guterres warned the Trump administration, that if the United States disengages from many issues confronting the international community it will be replaced".

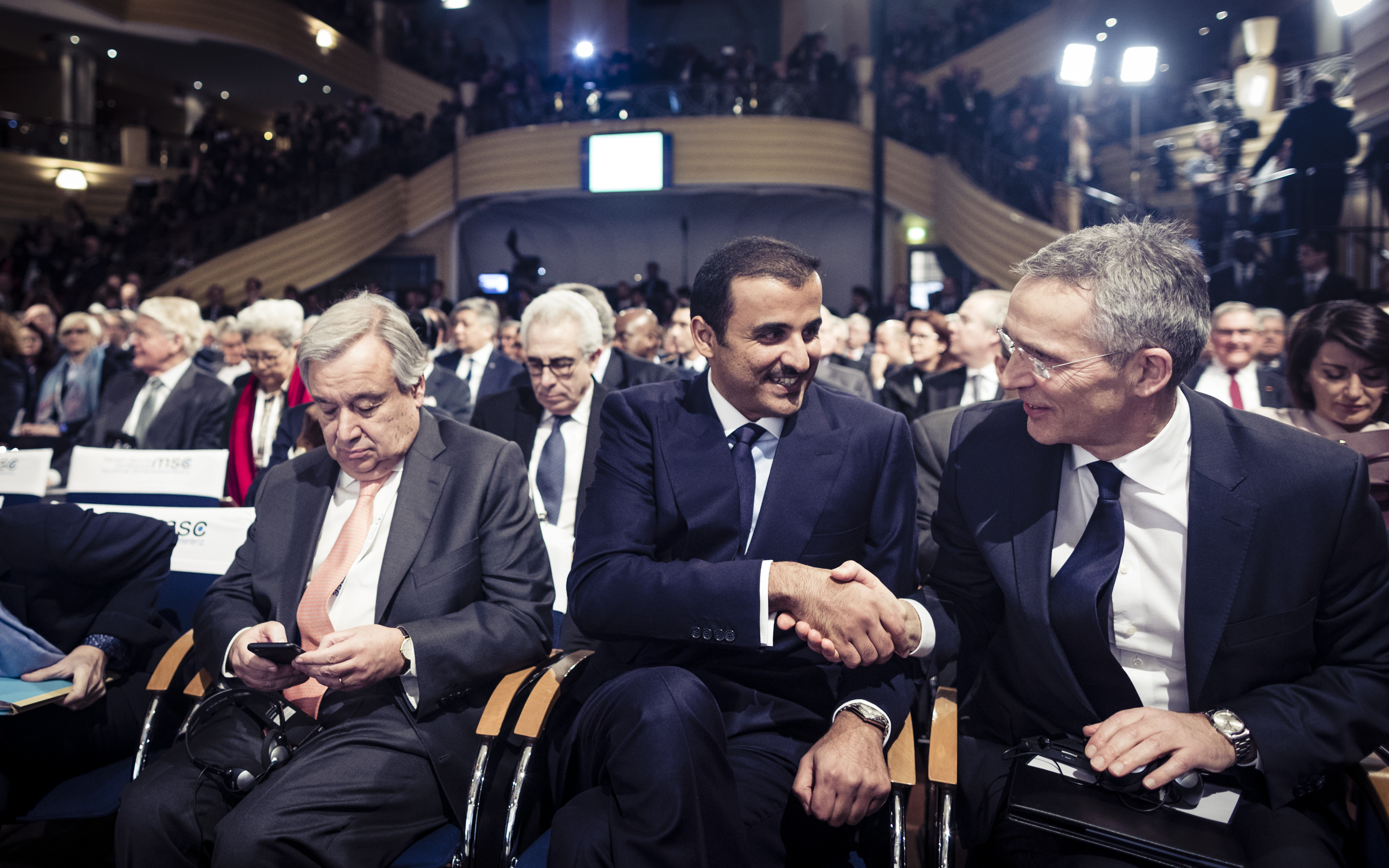
Guterres, Qatar's Emir Tamim bin Hamad and NATO Secretary General Jens Stoltenberg, 2018

In response to the death of Chinese Nobel Peace Prize laureate Liu Xiaobo, who died of organ failure while in government custody, Guterres said he was deeply saddened. After the violence during the 2017 Catalan independence referendum, Guterres trusted Spanish institutions to find a solution. He gave the same message when Catalonia declared independence on 27 October 2017 but said the solution should be made under the constitutional framework.

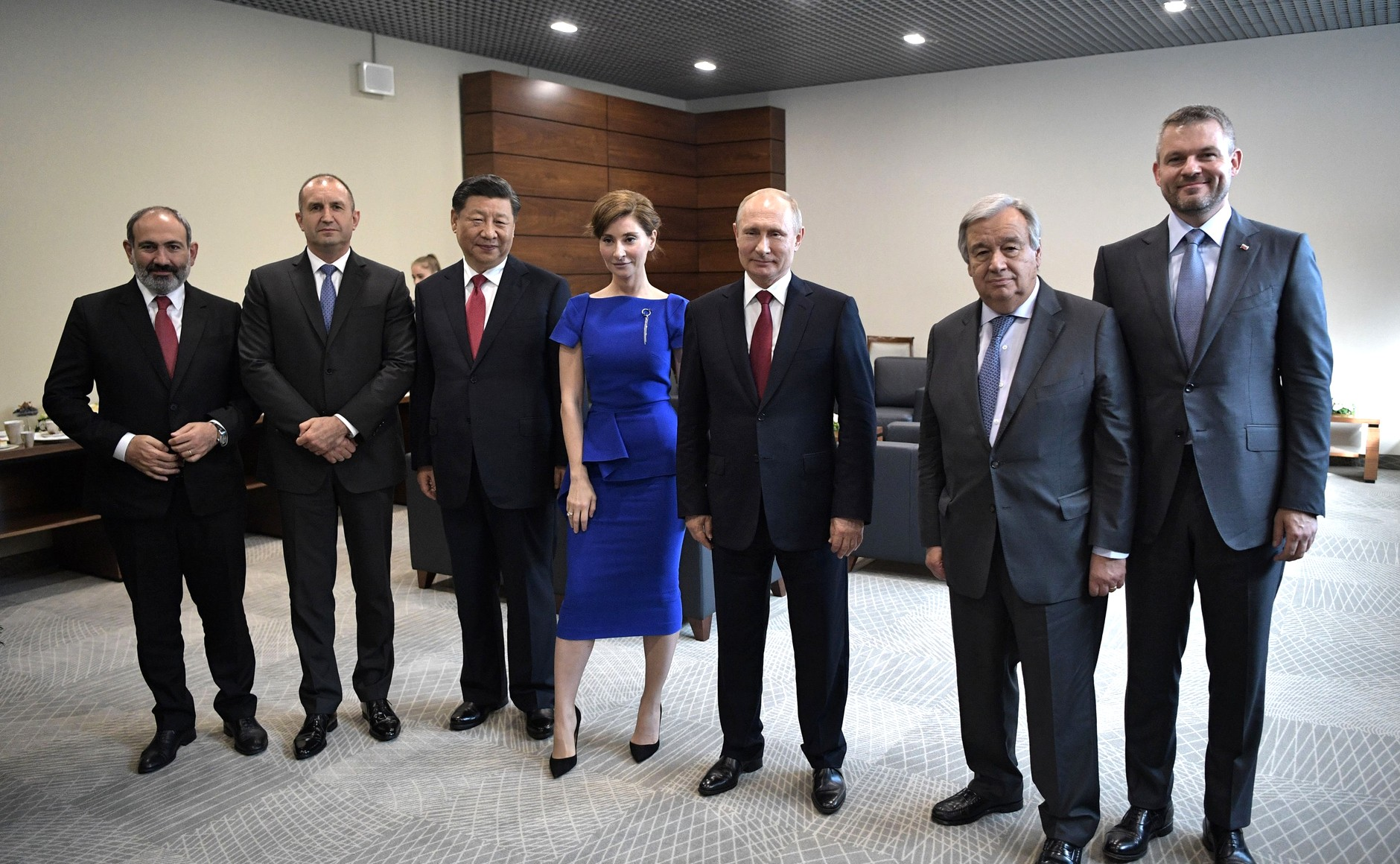
Guterres with Nikol Pashinyan, Rumen Radev, Xi Jinping, Sophie Shevardnadze, Vladimir Putin and Peter Pellegrini at the St. Petersburg International Economic Forum, June 2019

Guterres criticized the Saudi Arabian-led intervention in Yemen and the naval, land and air blockade of Yemen. The blockade has further aggravated Yemen's severe humanitarian crisis. Guterres said that the intervention in Yemen "is a stupid war. I think this war is against the interests of Saudi Arabia and the Emirates... [and] of the people of Yemen." Guterres opposed US President Donald Trump's decision to recognize Jerusalem as Israel's capital. In March 2018, Guterres said the population of Syria's Eastern Ghouta was living in "hell on earth", In one district, 93% of buildings had been damaged or destroyed by December, according to UN satellite imagery analysis. A recent wave of bombings has caused further destruction.

Guterres called the 2018 North Korea–United States summit a "crucial milestone" for nuclear disarmament. He urged both sides to "seize this momentous opportunity" and offered UN assistance to achieve the goal of dismantling North Korea's nuclear weapons program. In August 2018, Guterres called for an independent investigation into a Saudi Arabian-led coalition air strike in Yemen that killed 51 civilians, including 40 children.

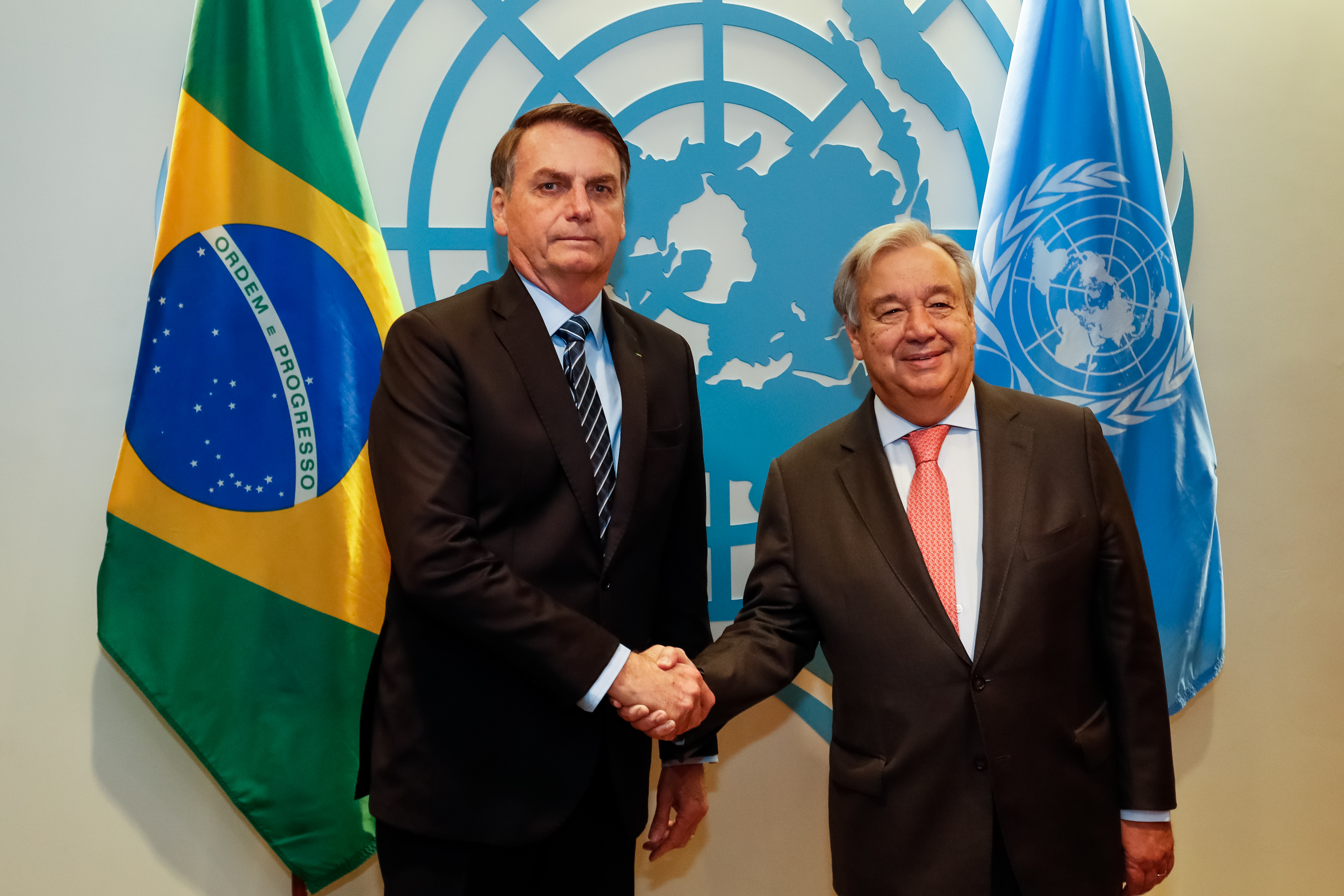
Guterres with Brazilian President Jair Bolsonaro, September 2019

Guterres condemned the persecution of the Rohingya Muslim minority in Myanmar and called for a stronger response to the crisis. In September 2018, during his address to the 73rd United Nations General Assembly, Guterres became the first secretary to say that advancing technology will disrupt labor markets like never before and to advocate stronger safety nets like Universal Basic Income. In 2019, human rights groups criticized Guterres for being "silent" as China sent ethnic Uyghurs and other predominantly Muslim ethnic minorities to the Xinjiang re-education camps. Human Rights Watch chief Kenneth Roth said that Guterres "has been notably silent on one of the most important, ... the most brazen human rights abuses, ... because he is worried about upsetting the Chinese."

In June 2019, Guterres stated that the "U.N. has the obligation to assume global leadership" in tackling climate change in the context of a visit to the pacific island of Tuvalu. He had previously supported other multilateral environmental initiatives, such as ecocide becoming a crime at the International Criminal Court and the Global Pact for the Environment that was put forward by France in September 2017. In September 2019, Guterres condemned Israeli plans to annex the eastern portion of the occupied West Bank known as the Jordan Valley. Guterres expressed his "deep concern" at the spiralling violence in Syria a day after Turkey launched an offensive in Kurdish-controlled areas. He said any solution to the conflict needed to respect the sovereignty of the territory and the unity of Syria.

In 2020, the World Jewish Congress awarded him the Theodor Herzl Prize. In the laudatory speech, its president Ronald Lauder called Guterres a "true and devoted friend of the Jewish people and the state of Israel." More than that: "the voice of fairness and justice that the State of Israel and the Jewish people had hoped for at the United Nations for a very, very long time."

Guterres praised the Israel–United Arab Emirates peace agreement, stating that he welcomes "any initiative that can promote peace and security in the Middle East region." Guterres expressed the hope that the agreement between Israel and Sudan to normalize relations would create opportunities for peace and prosperity. On 10 August 2020, responding to an explosion in Beirut, Guterres expressed his support for all people in need in Lebanon, especially women and girls who are most vulnerable in times of crisis. On 22 September, he appealed for global solidarity to overcome COVID-19, and again called for a global ceasefire by the end of 2020. In September 2020, Guterres stated that he would continue with "a serious dialogue" with UN member states, for a comprehensive Reform of the UN Security Council.

On 6 October 2020, Guterres expressed deep concern over the escalation of hostilities in the disputed region of Nagorno-Karabakh and called on Armenia and Azerbaijan to immediately halt fighting and progress towards a peaceful resolution.

==== Second term ====
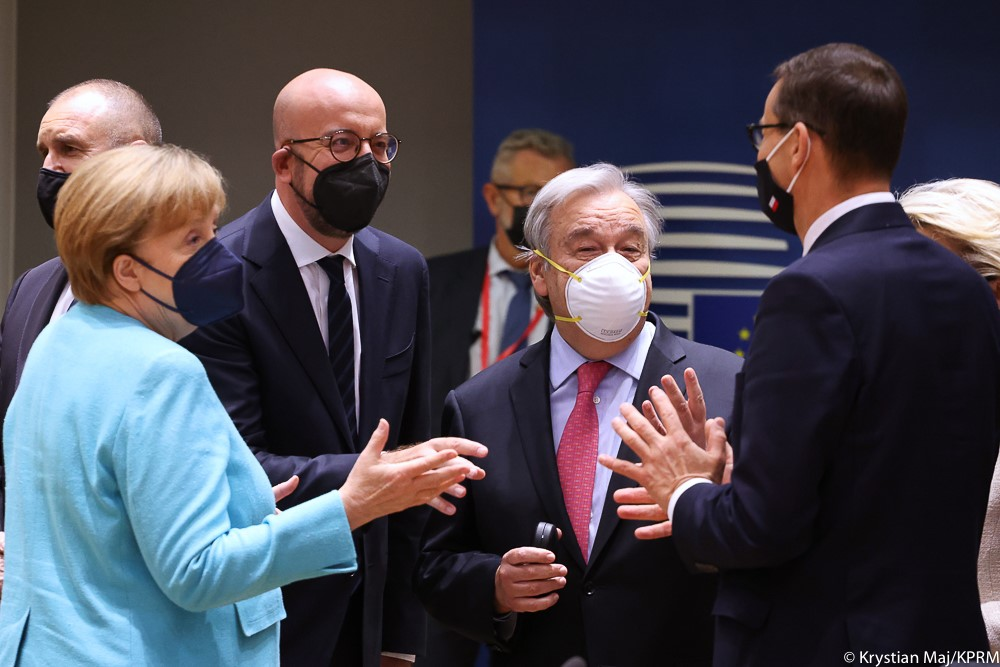
Guterres with President of the European Council Charles Michel, German Chancellor Angela Merkel and Polish Prime Minister Mateusz Morawiecki in Brussels, 24 June 2021

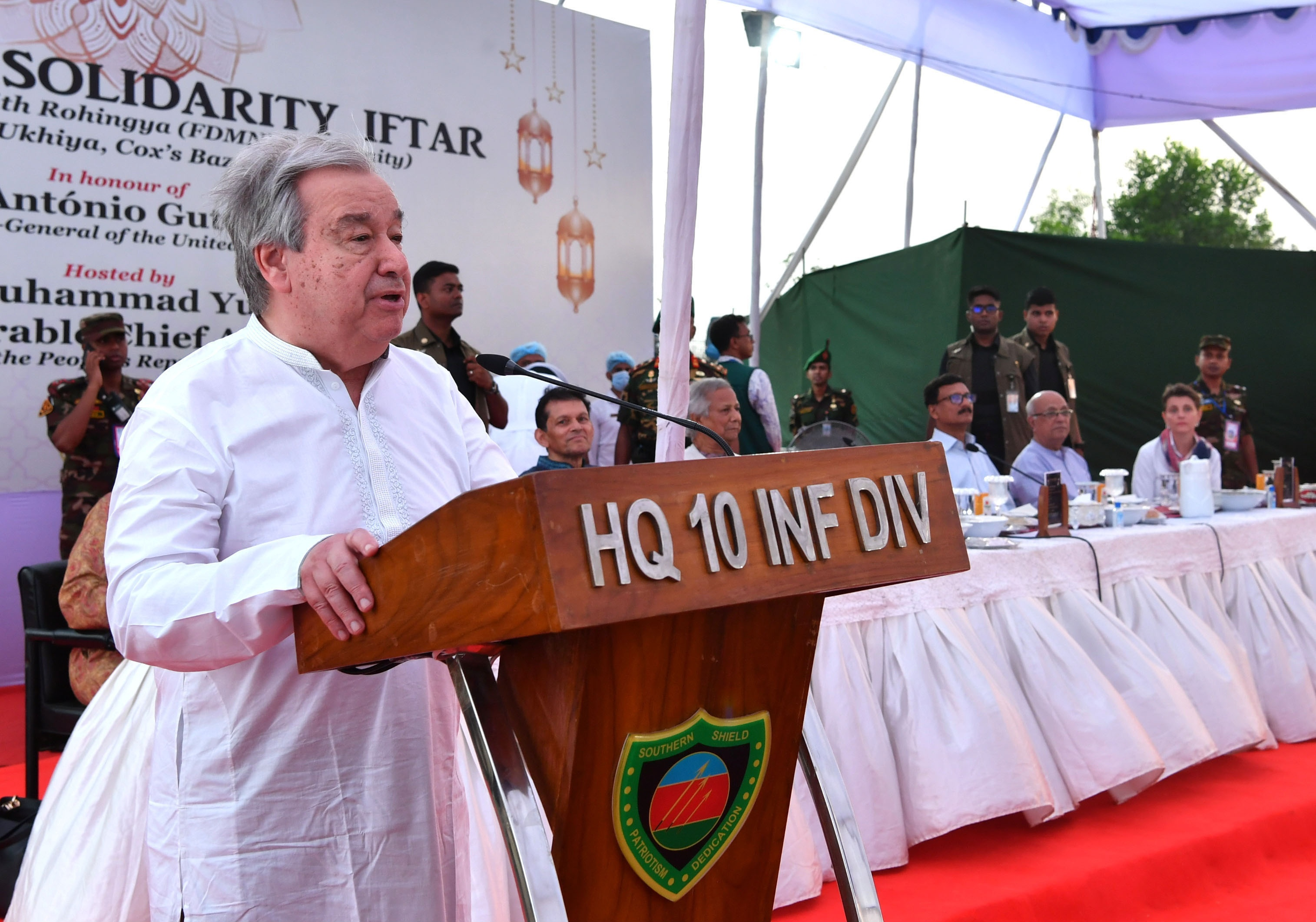
António Guterres addresses the Rohingya refugees in Bangladesh.

On 8 June 2021, the United Nations Security Council expressed support for his re-election as secretary-general. On 18 June 2021, Guterres was appointed for a second term by a voting session of the United Nations General Assembly.

In July 2021 Guterres stated it was "highly desirable" to make ecocide a crime at the International Criminal Court.

In April 2022, Guterres went to Ukraine during the Russian invasion. He was surprised to see that the Russian army shelled parts of Kyiv even when he was there. In response to evacuation efforts initiated by the UN on 30 April following Guterres's visit to Ukraine and Russia, dozens of civilians were photographed by Reuters as being allowed by Russian troops to be evacuated from their entrenched positions in the Azovstal Iron and Steel Works in Mariupol. Guterres stated that "instead of hitting the brakes on the decarbonization of the global economy, now is the time to put the pedal to the metal towards a renewable energy future."

In May 2022, Guterres went on a tour through West Africa. There, he met families who had been affected by the Islamist insurgency, and pushed for robust African peace initiatives and other counter-terrorism operations under the wing of the African Union.

On 22 July 2022, together with Turkey, the United Nations under the leadership of Guterres brokered a deal between Russia and Ukraine clearing the way for the export of grain from Ukrainian ports.

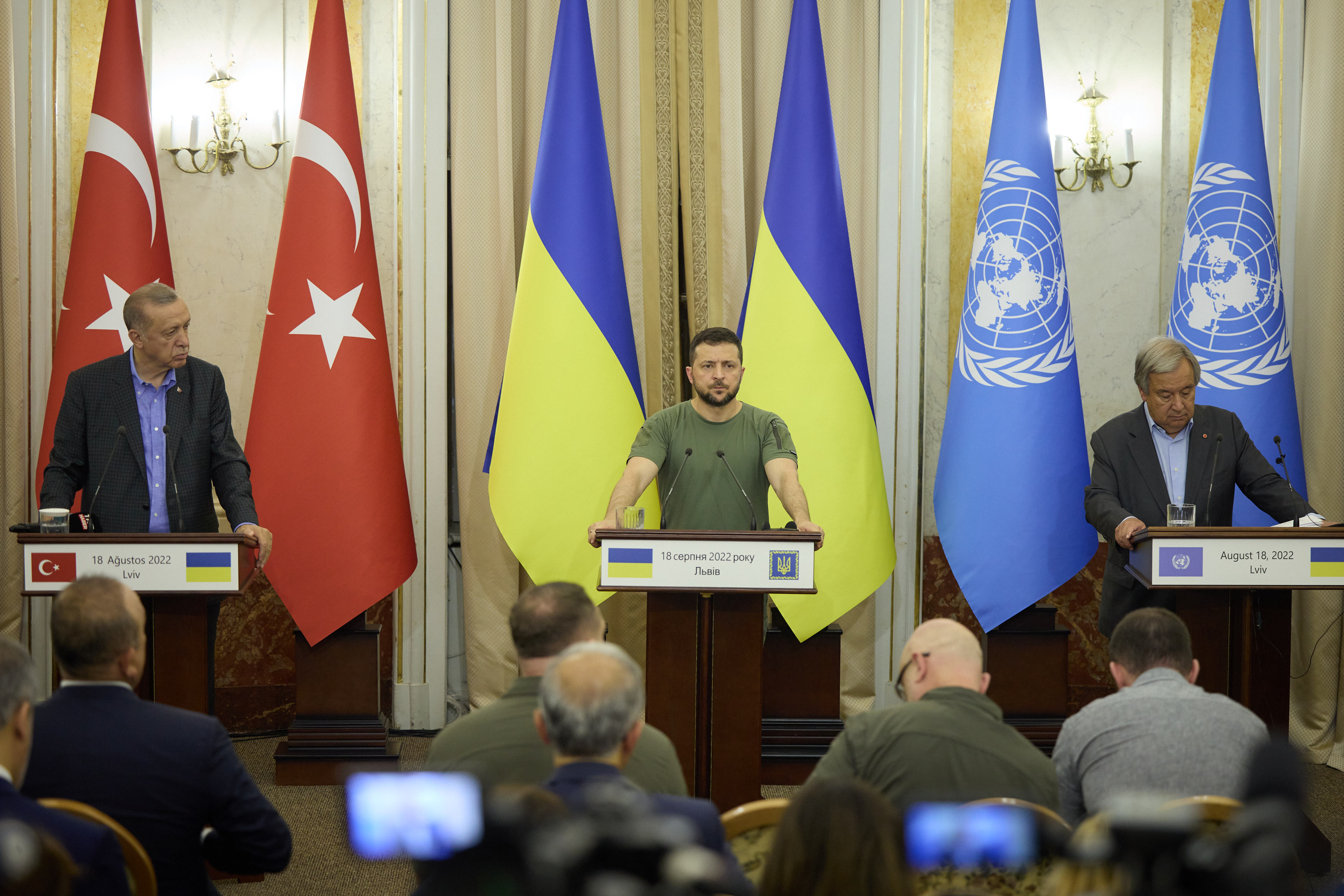
Guterres with Turkish President Recep Tayyip Erdoğan and Ukrainian President Volodymyr Zelenskyy in Lviv, Ukraine, 18 August 2022

In November 2022, Guterres met with Ethiopian Prime Minister Abiy Ahmed. He praised the ceasefire between the Ethiopian government and Tigray rebels that ended the two-year Tigray War, saying the war in Ethiopia had resulted in "more casualties" than the Russian invasion of Ukraine.

In January 2023, Guterres called for a global effort to transform education and added that it was time to "translate their Summit Commitments into concrete actions", create an inclusive learning environment that supports all students and "to end all the discriminatory laws and practices that hinder access to education."

In April 2023, the 2023 Pentagon document leaks revealed that Guterres was spied on by U.S. intelligence. Previously, the U.S. and other Western nations had accused Guterres to be overly soft on Russian president Vladimir Putin.

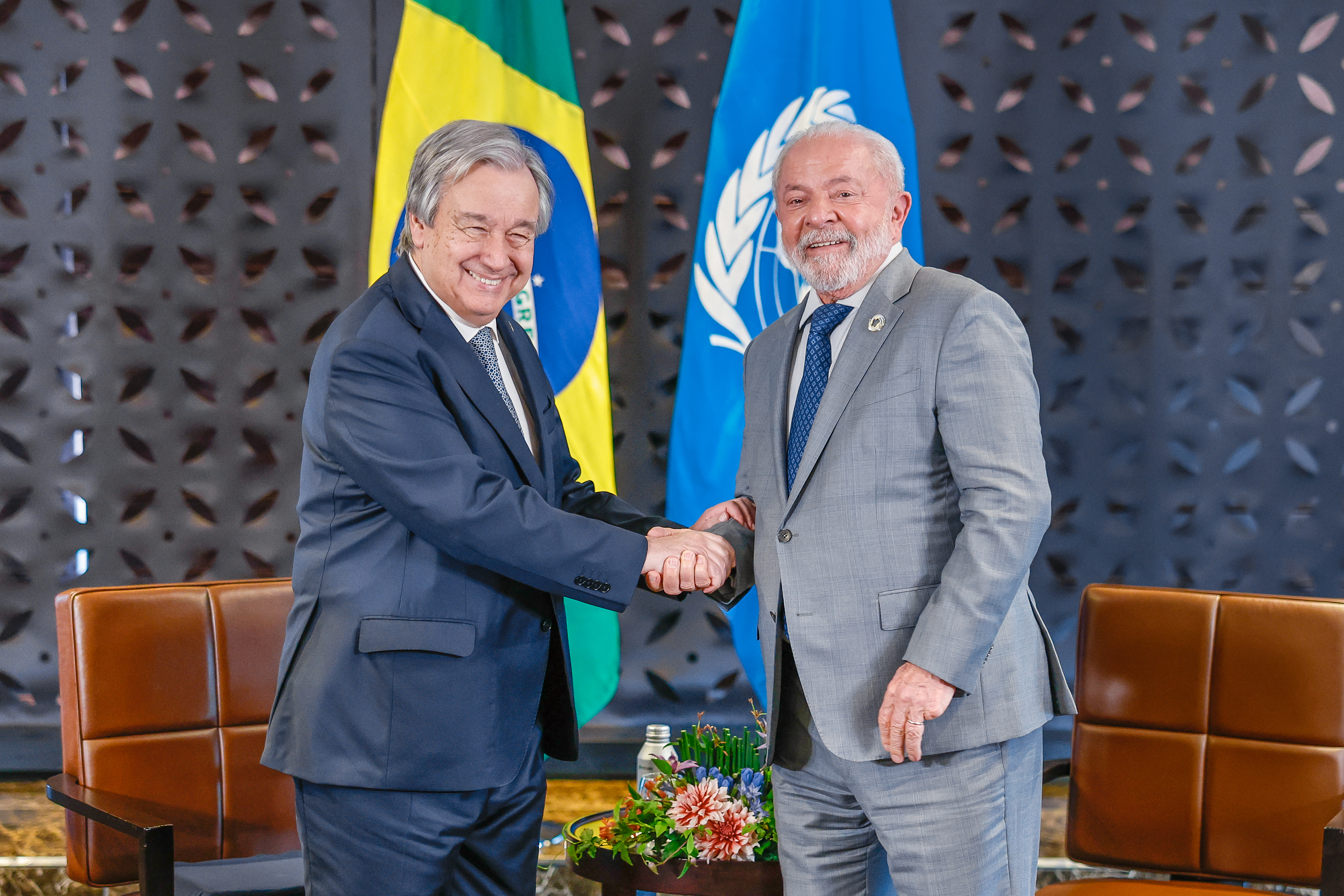
Guterres with Brazilian President Luiz Inácio Lula da Silva at the 49th G7 summit in Hiroshima, 21 May 2023

In May 2023, Guterres stated that peace negotiations to end the Russo-Ukrainian War were "not possible at this moment", saying it was clear that Russia and Ukraine "are completely absorbed in this war" and "are convinced that they can win."

In July 2023, Guterres proposed the creation of an international body to oversee artificial intelligence. He stated that "Generative AI has enormous potential for good and evil at scale. Its creators themselves have warned that much bigger, potentially catastrophic and existential risks lie ahead". He also said that the United Nations has an opportunity to adopt rules that make consensus and to foster international coordination.

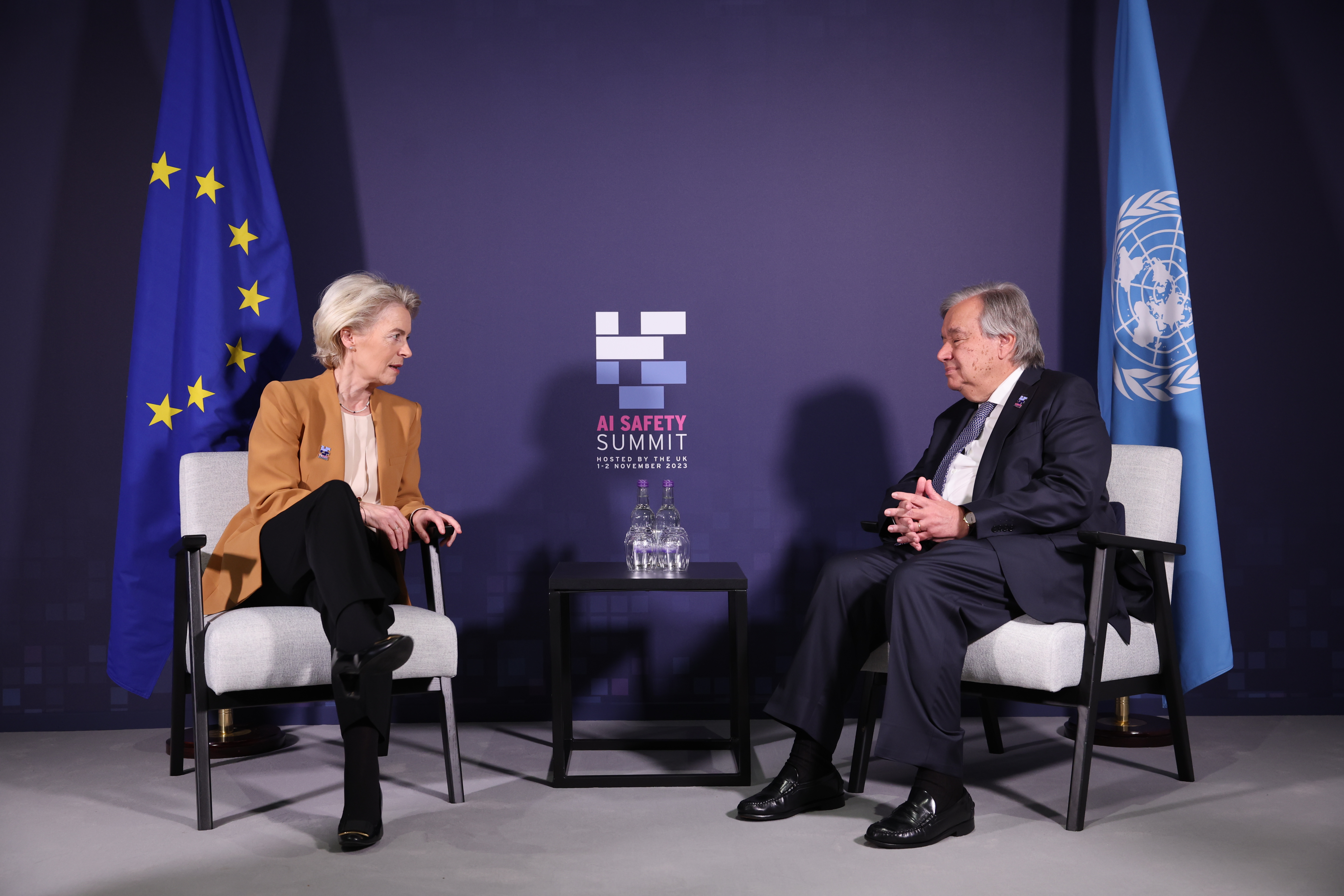
Guterres with President of the European Commission Ursula von der Leyen, November 2023

Guterres condemned the actions of Hamas during the Gaza war, but said he was "deeply distressed" by Israel's decision to impose a total blockade on the Gaza Strip. As The Nation mentioned, Guterres condemned Israel for the "clear violations of international humanitarian law" and demanded an immediate ceasefire. After Guterres made statements critical of Israel's actions in Gaza, particularly his claim that Hamas's attack "did not happen in a vacuum", and "the Palestinian people have been subjected to 56 years of suffocating occupation," Israeli ambassador to the United Nations Gilad Erdan demanded Guterres's resignation, calling his statements "pure blood libel". In the aftermath of Guterres's statement, Israel blocked issuing visas to UN representatives. Following this, Guterres said that he was "shocked by the misrepresentations" of his statement, pointing out he had also said that "...the grievances of the Palestinian people cannot justify the appalling attacks by Hamas."

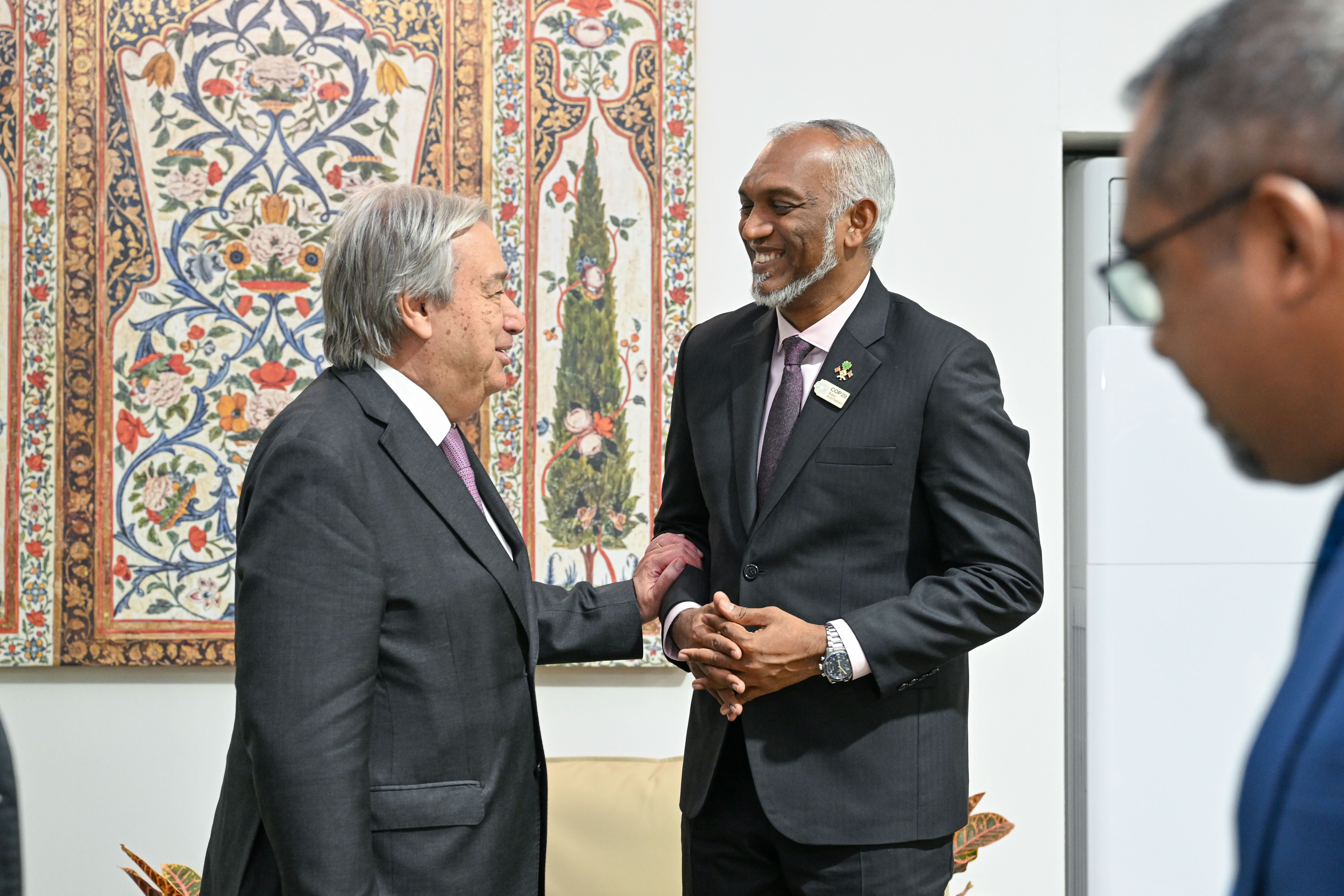
Guterres with Maldivian President Mohamed Muizzu, November 2024

In February 2024, Guterres called for a full investigation into the death of Russian opposition activist and political prisoner Alexei Navalny.

In August 2024, Guterres was awarded, unanimously, East-Timorese citizenship by the National Parliament of East Timor for his dedication to the country's independence. On his citizenship acceptance speech Guterres alluded to the fact that "from now on there is a UN Secretary-General who is both Portuguese and East-Timorese." This is first time a UN Secretary-General holds double-citizenship.

In October 2024, Israeli Foreign Minister Israel Katz declared Guterres persona non grata in Israel for his declarations about the October 2024 Iranian strikes against Israel in which he called for a ceasefire but did not mention the Iranian attack on Israel. Later he condemned the Iranian strikes on Israel.

On 24 October 2024, Guterres attended the 16th BRICS summit in Kazan, Russia, where he called for a "just peace" in Ukraine "in line with the UN Charter, international law and UN General Assembly resolutions." After Guterres warmly shook hands with Vladimir Putin during the BRICS summit in Kazan, Volodymyr Zelenskyy refused to meet with Guterres in Kyiv with the Ministry of Foreign Affairs of Ukraine releasing the statement: "This is a wrong choice that does not advance the cause of peace. It only damages the UN's reputation"; and adding, "The UN secretary general declined Ukraine's invitation to the first Global Peace Summit in Switzerland. He did, however, accept the invitation to Kazan from war criminal Putin." Putin has been a fugitive since 17 March 2023 when the International Criminal Court (ICC) issued an arrest warrant following an investigation of war crimes, crimes against humanity and genocide by Putin during the Russo-Ukrainian War. On the contrary, scholars like Bahauddin Foizee defended Guterres's engagement with controversial leaders like Putin as a pragmatic necessity for maintaining diplomacy. Foizee argued that excluding major powers such as Russia from international dialogue could undermine the United Nations' capacity to facilitate broader peace initiatives.

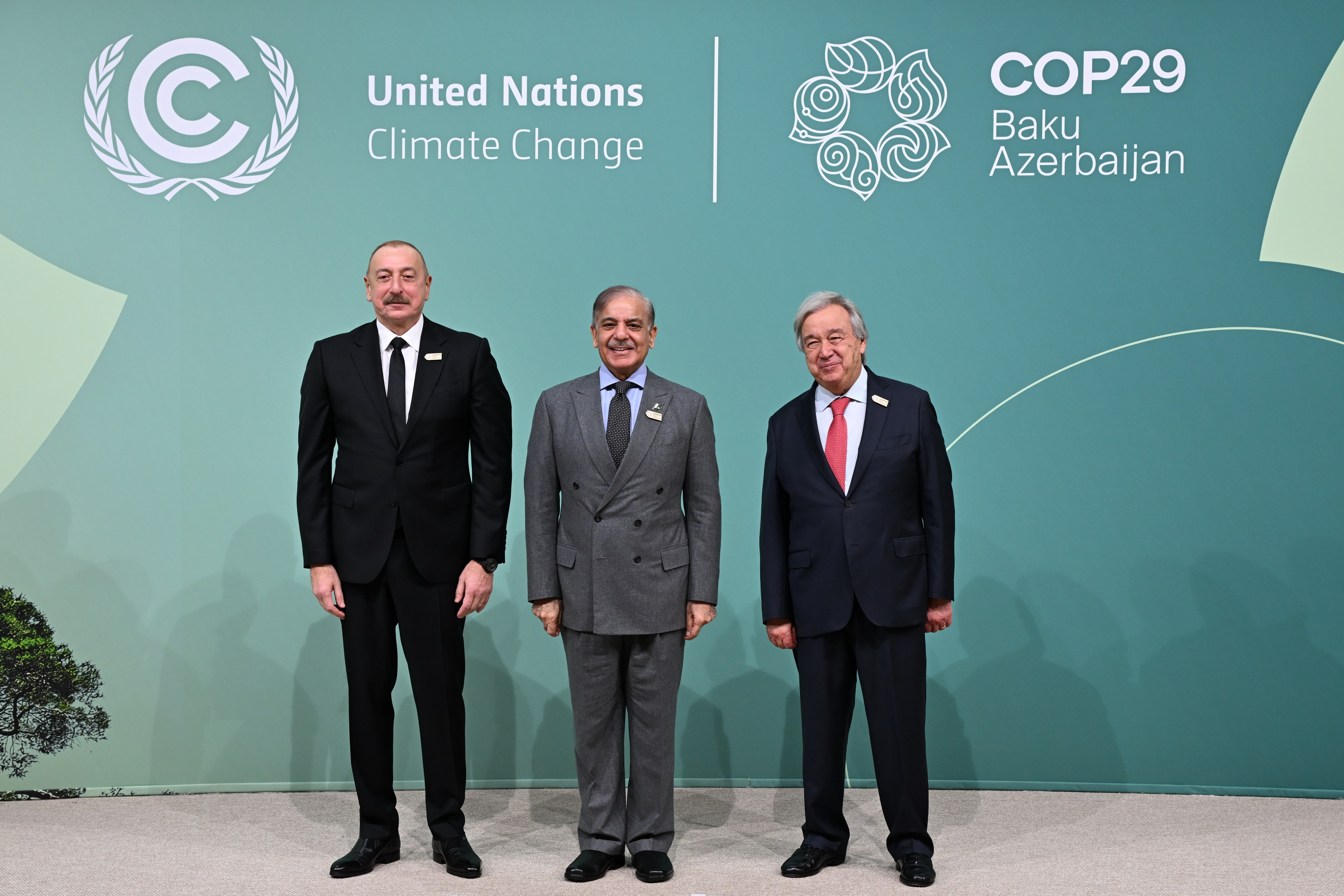
Guterres with Azerbaijani President Ilham Aliyev and Pakistani Prime Minister Shehbaz Sharif at the COP29 climate conference in Baku, Azerbaijan, November 2024

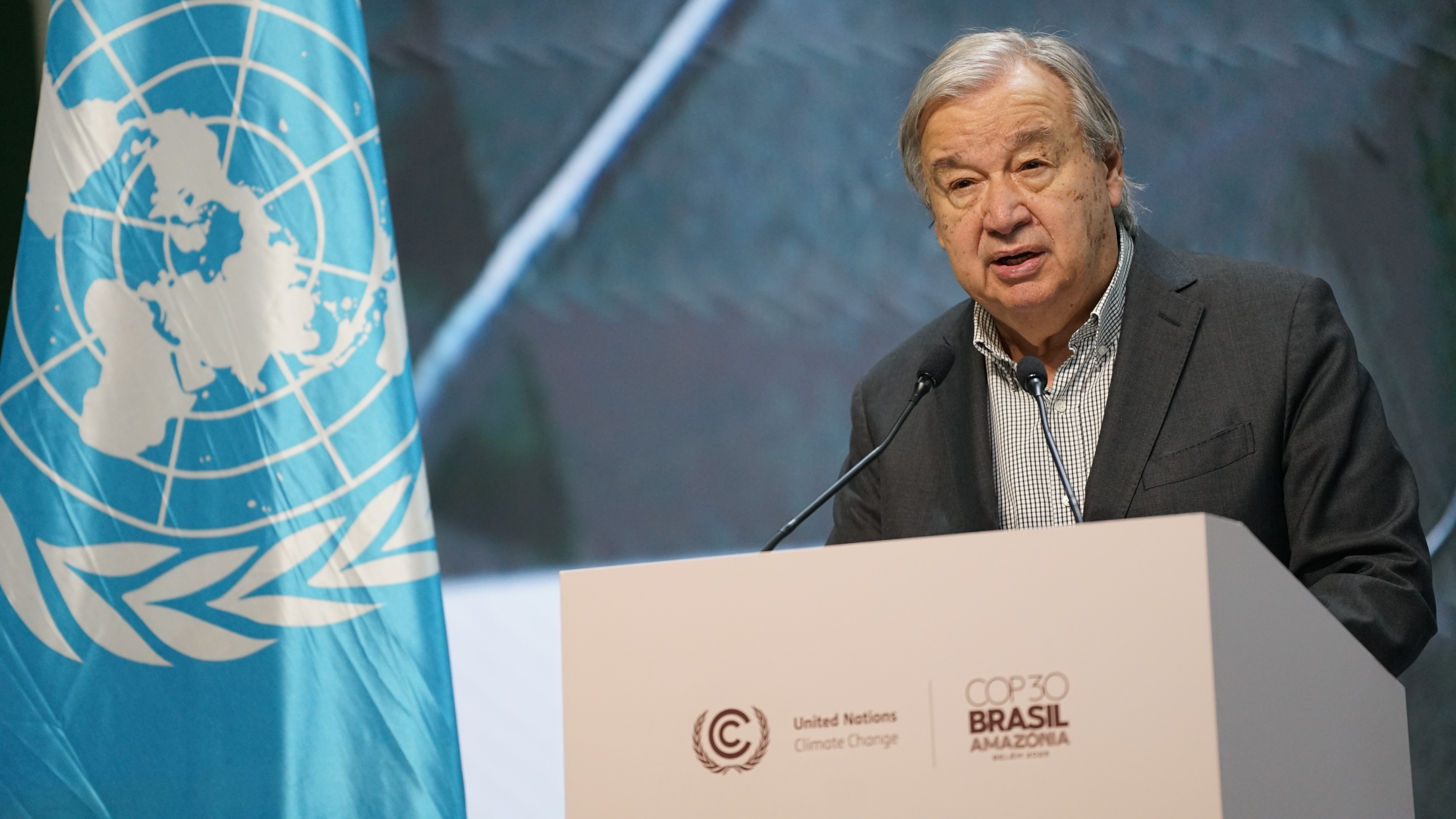
Guterres at COP30 in Belém

In December 2024, Guterres stated that he also wants to see a permanent seat for the African Union on the UN Security Council, for more fairness and justice in this world towards African countries.

On 25 January 2025, Guterres called for Rwanda to remove its troops from the Democratic Republic of the Congo and end its support for the M23 rebels.

On 18 March 2025, Antonio Guterres as United Nations Secretary-General said in a statement issued by his spokesperson that he is "shocked" by the Israeli attacks on the Gaza Strip, which have killed "a meaningful number" of civilians, further stating that he "strongly appeals for the ceasefire to be respected, for unimpeded humanitarian assistance to be reestablished and for the remaining hostages to be released unconditionally."

On 22 June 2025, Guterres described US strikes on Iranian nuclear sites as a "dangerous escalation" and called for diplomacy.

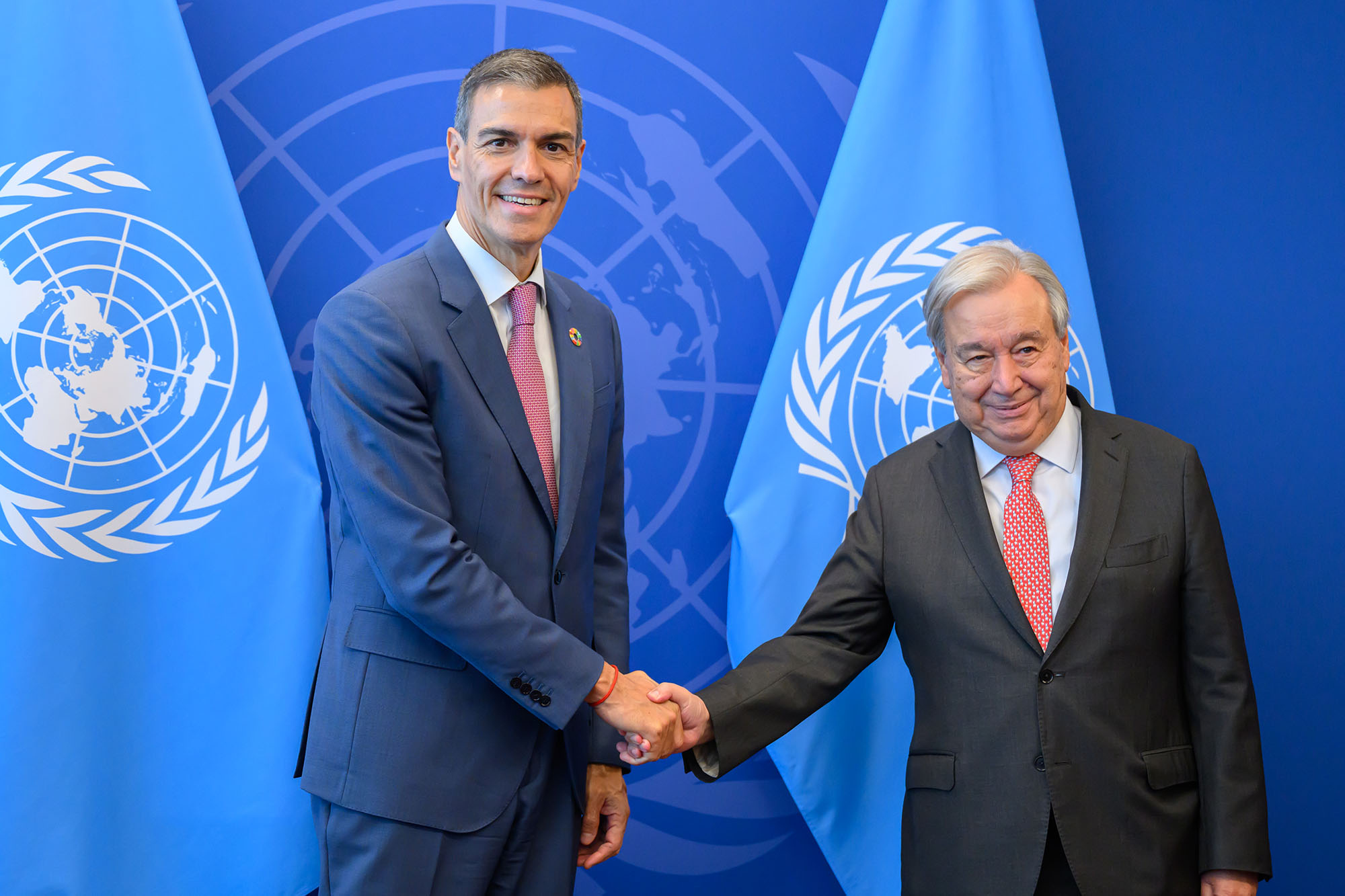
Guterres with Spanish Prime Minister Pedro Sánchez, September 2025

In October 2025, Guterres condemned the massacre of civilians in El Fasher, Sudan, and called for an end to the violence in the Sudanese civil war.

On 15 December 2025, Guterres condemned the mass shooting on the families and victims who gathered at Bondi Beach to celebrate Hanukkah, and said he was 'horrified' by the attack.

In January 2026, Guterres stated that he was "shocked" by reports of lethal violence and the "excessive use of force" by Iranian authorities during the 2025–2026 Iranian protests. However, in February 2026, he faced backlash for allegedly congratulating Iranian President Masoud Pezeshkian on the anniversary of the Iranian Revolution. The UN insisted that the letter was simply a matter of protocol and a "routine diplomatic gesture" and should not been seen as an endorsement of policy.

On 28 February 2026, following the US–Israeli military strikes on Iran (Operation Epic Fury), Guterres condemned both the strikes and Iran's retaliatory attacks.

== Other activities ==
- Dag Hammarskjöld Fund for journalists, chairman of the Honorary Advisory Council
- Caixa Geral de Depósitos, advisor to the board (2003–2005)
- Champalimaud Foundation, member of the Vision Award Jury
- Clean Cooking Alliance, member of the Leadership Council
- Club of Madrid, member (since 2002)
- European Council on Foreign Relations (ECFR), member
- International Gender Champions (IGC), member
- European Regional Innovation Awards, chairman of the Jury (2004)
- Friends of Europe, member of the board of trustees
- Calouste Gulbenkian Foundation, non-executive member of the board of trustees (2013–2018)
- World Economic Forum (WEF), member of the Global Agenda Council on Humanitarian Assistance (2008–2009)
- He resigned from the International Peace Institute in October 2020.

== Personal life ==
In 1972, Guterres married child psychiatrist Luísa Amélia Guimarães e Melo, with whom he had two children, Pedro Guimarães e Melo Guterres (born 1977) and Mariana Guimarães e Melo Guterres (born 1985). His wife died of cancer at the Royal Free Hospital in London in 1998 at the age of 51.

In 2001, Guterres married Catarina Marques de Almeida Vaz Pinto (born 1960), a former Portuguese state secretary for culture and culture secretary for the City Council of Lisbon.

In addition to his native Portuguese, Guterres speaks English, French and Spanish.

Guterres is a practicing Catholic.

== Electoral history ==
=== PS leadership election, 1992 ===
Ballot: 21 February 1992
Candidate	Votes	%
António Guterres	1,122	67.3
Álvaro Beleza	190	11.4
Jorge Sampaio	withdrew	
Blank/Invalid ballots	354	21.2
Turnout	1,666	
Source: Acção Socialista

=== Legislative election, 1995 ===
Ballot: 1 October 1995
Party	Candidate	Votes	%	Seats	+/−
PS	António Guterres	2,583,755	43.8	112	+40
PSD	Fernando Nogueira	2,014,589	34.1	88	–47
CDS–PP	Manuel Monteiro	534,470	9.1	15	+10
CDU	Carlos Carvalhas	506,157	8.6	15	–2
Other parties		152,790	2.6	0	–1
Blank/Invalid ballots		113,093	1.9	–	–
Turnout		5,904,854	66.30	230	±0
Source: Comissão Nacional de Eleições

=== PS leadership election, 1999 ===
Ballot: 17 January 1999
Candidate	Votes	%
António Guterres	~66,100	96.7
Against	~1,100	1.6
Blank/Invalid ballots	~1,200	1.7
Turnout	~68,400	64.5
Source: Acção Socialista

=== Legislative election, 1999 ===
Ballot: 10 October 1999
Party	Candidate	Votes	%	Seats	+/−
PS	António Guterres	2,385,922	44.1	115	+3
PSD	José Manuel Durão Barroso	1,750,158	32.3	81	–7
CDU	Carlos Carvalhas	487,058	9.0	17	+2
CDS–PP	Paulo Portas	451,643	8.3	15	±0
BE	Francisco Louçã	132,333	2.4	2	new
Other parties		99,842	1.8	0	±0
Blank/Invalid ballots		108,194	2.0	–	–
Turnout		5,415,102	61.02	230	±0
Source: Comissão Nacional de Eleições

=== PS leadership election, 2001 ===
Ballot: 21 January 2001
Candidate	Votes	%
António Guterres	51,603	96.2
Blank/Invalid ballots	2,042	3.8
Turnout	53,645	
Source: Acção Socialista

=== UN Secretary-General election, 2016 ===
Ballot: 5 October 2016
Candidate	Votes
António Guterres	Acclaimed

=== UN Secretary-General election, 2021 ===
Ballot: 8 June 2021
Candidate	Votes
António Guterres	Acclaimed

== Recognition ==
=== Honours ===
==== National ====
- : Grand Cross of the Military Order of Christ (9 June 2002)
- : Grand Cross of the Order of Liberty (2 February 2016)

==== Foreign ====
- Belgium: Grand Cordon of the Order of Leopold (9 October 2000)
- Brazil: Grand Cross of the Order of the Southern Cross (23 July 1996)
  - Pará: Grand Collar of the National Order of Merit of Grão Pará (4 April 2002)
- Cape Verde: First Class of the Order of Amílcar Cabral Order (27 April 2001)
- Chile: Grand Cross of the Order of Merit (30 September 2001)
- France: Grand Cross of the National Order of Merit (4 February 2002)
- Greece: Grand Cross of the Order of Honour (17 March 2000)
- Italy: Knight Grand Cross of the Order of Merit of the Italian Republic (3 December 2001)
- Japan: Grand Cordon of the Order of the Rising Sun (4 April 2002)
- Mexico: Sash of Special Category of the Order of the Aztec Eagle (2 July 1999)
- Niger: Grand Cross of the Order of Merit of Niger (2 May 2022)
- Oman: First Class of the Order of Oman (15 December 2025)
- Poland: Grand Cross of the Order of Merit of the Republic of Poland (22 September 1997)
- Spain:
  - Knight of the Collar of the Order of Charles III (7 November 2023)
  - Knight of the Collar of the Order of Isabella the Catholic (14 June 2002)
  - Knight Grand Cross of the Order of Charles III (8 September 2000)
- Tunisia: Grand Cordon of the Order of the Republic (4 April 2002)
- Turkmenistan: Recipient of the Jubilee Medal "25 years of Neutrality of Turkmenistan" (11 December 2020)
- Ukraine: First Class of the Order of Prince Yaroslav the Wise (4 April 2002)
- Uruguay: Grand Officer of the Medal of the Oriental Republic of Uruguay (10 December 1998)
- Uzbekistan: Order of Highest Friendship (1 July 2024)
- Sovereign Order of Malta: Grand Cross with Collar of Order pro Merito Melitensi (21 September 2024)

=== Honorary degrees ===
- 2010 – Honorary Doctorate, University of Beira Interior
- 2014 – Honorary Doctorate, Meiji University
- 2016 – Honorary Doctorate of Laws, Carleton University
- 2016 – Honorary Doctorate, University of Coimbra
- 2016 – Honorary Doctorate, European University of Madrid
- 2017 – Honorary Doctorate, University of South Carolina
- 2021 – Honorary Doctorate of Law, University of Cambridge
- 2022 – Honorary Doctorate, National University of Córdoba
- 2022 – Honorary Degree, Seton Hall University

=== Other awards ===
- 2005 – Personality of the Year by the Foreign Press Association in Portugal (Associação de Imprensa Estrangeira em Portugal, AIEP)
- 2007 – Freedom Award (shared with Angelina Jolie)
- 2009 – Calouste Gulbenkian International Prize (shared with the Peace Research Institute in the Middle East)
- 2009 – Forbes List of The World's Most Powerful People in 2009
- 2015 – W. Averell Harriman Democracy Award
- 2015 – The National German Sustainability Award
- 2019 – Charlemagne Prize
- 2025 – Atatürk International Peace Prize

== See also ==
- Climate change mitigation
- List of trips by António Guterres

== Notes ==
Party political offices
Preceded by Jorge Sampaio	Secretary-General of the Socialist Party; 1992–2002	Succeeded by Eduardo Ferro Rodrigues
Preceded by Pierre Mauroy	President of the Socialist International; 1999–2005	Succeeded by George Papandreou
Political offices
Preceded by Jorge Sampaio	Leader of the Opposition; 1992–1995	Succeeded by Fernando Nogueira
Preceded by Aníbal Cavaco Silva	Prime Minister of Portugal; 1995–2002	Succeeded by José Manuel Barroso
Diplomatic posts
Preceded by Ruud Lubbers	United Nations High Commissioner for Refugees; 2005–2015	Succeeded by Filippo Grandi
Preceded by Ban Ki-moon	Secretary-General of the United Nations; 2017–present	Incumbent
