= Catarina Vaz Pinto =

Portuguese politician (born 1960)

- Born: 15 June 1960 (age 66); Goa, Portuguese India
- Education: Portuguese Catholic University; College of Europe
- Employer: City of Lisbon
- Title: Councillor of Culture
- Spouse: António Guterres (m. 2001)

Catarina Vaz Pinto (born 15 June 1960) is a Portuguese politician. She is the councillor of culture for the City of Lisbon and previously was the State Secretary of Culture and Deputy Minister of Culture in the Government of Portugal.

== Biography ==
Born in Goa, Vaz Pinto holds a law degree from the Portuguese Catholic University and a postgraduate degree in European Studies from the College of Europe. She previously served as the Executive Coordinator of the Gulbenkian Programme for Creativity and Artistic Creation/Calouste Gulbenkian Foundation and as a consultant for Quaternaire in the area of cultural projects and policy. She was executive director and lecturer in the postgraduate degree in Cultural Management for Cities at the Institute for Business Management Development and co-founder/chief executive of Fórum Dança Cultural Association. In 2016, she received the insignia of the Order of Arts and Letters from the Government of France.

Vaz Pinto currently serves as patron of the Women's International Forum.

She is married to António Guterres, former Prime Minister of Portugal who currently serves as Secretary-General of the United Nations.
