= Vítor Melícias =

Portuguese Franciscan friar

The Reverend Father Frei Vítor Melícias, O.F.M. GCC GOM GCM
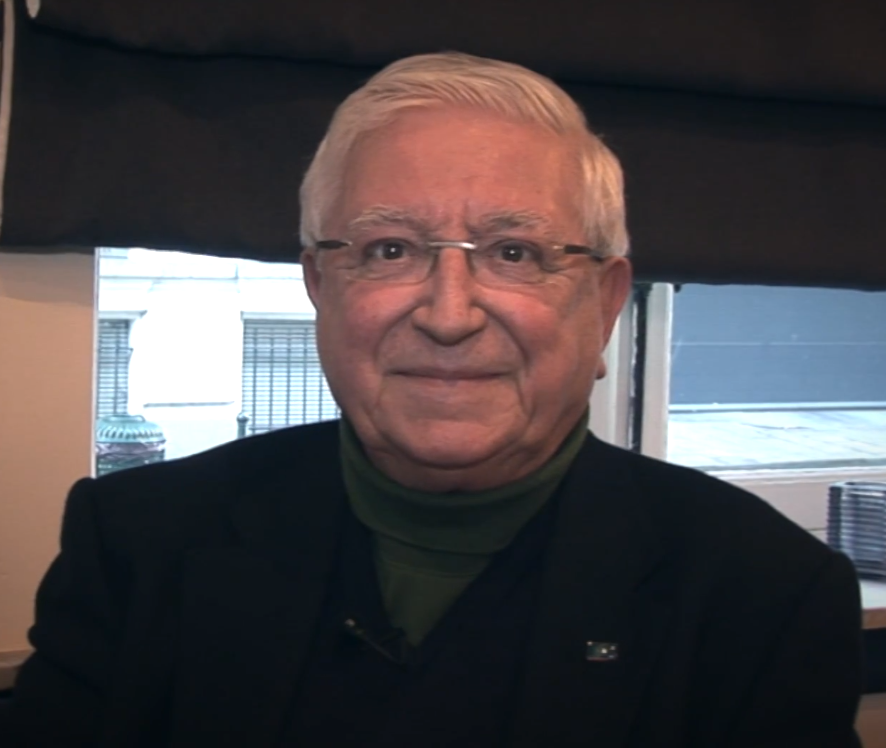

Chancellor of the Orders of Civil Merit
- In office 11 October 1993 – 9 March 2006
- President: Jorge Sampaio
- Preceded by: José de Azeredo Perdigão
- Succeeded by: António Pinto da França

Chair of the Lisbon Holy House of Mercy
- In office 9 March 1988 – January 1992
- Prime Minister: Aníbal Cavaco Silva
- Preceded by: José Damasceno de Campos
- Succeeded by: Fernanda Mota Pinto

Chairman of the Board of Banco Montepio
- In office 1983–1988

Personal details
- Born: 25 July 1938 (age 87) Ramalhal, Torres Vedras, Portugal

Frei Vítor José Melícias Lopes (born 25 July 1938) is a Portuguese Franciscan friar.

== Biography ==
Ordained a priest in 1962, Melícias holds a law degree from the University of Lisbon, and a degree in canon law (1965) from the Pontifical University Antonianum in Rome, where he received a scholarship from the Calouste Gulbenkian Foundation.

Melícias was a member of Lisbon's municipal council from 1979 to 1983. He has also served on the boards of numerous charitable organizations and other associations. From 1974 till 1980 he was president of Liga dos Bombeiros Portugueses (the Portuguese firefighters association), later chairing (1981–1983) the Serviço Nacional de Bombeiros (that country's national fire service). In 1983 he was elected chairman of the board of directors of the Banco Montepio credit union, where he remained until 1988; he still holds a post as chairman of Montepio's general meeting board. At the same time he directed Santa Casa da Misericórdia de Lisboa—the nonprofit organization which operates all licensed gambling and lotteries in Portugal—a position he held until 1992.

Also in 1991 he became president of the União das Misericórdias Portuguesas, and two years later was elected honorary president of the Confederação Internacional das Misericórdias, based in Rio de Janeiro; both groups are Catholic charities. After becoming a full member of the European Economic and Social Committee in 1998, the following year he was appointed a national commissioner to support the political transition from Indonesian occupation to the independence of East Timor.

Parallel to these activities, Melícias has been a professor of canon law, teaching legal philosophy who has taught at Lisbon's Seminário da Luz, at Lisbon's Instituto Superior de Estudos Eclesiásticos (Institute of Ecclesiastical Studies, ISEE), at the Instituto Superior de Teologia (Évora Theological Institute) and at the Catholic University of Portugal. He has also taught ethics and management courses at the private Instituto Superior das Novas Profissões (Higher Institute for New Professions).

Melícias was awarded the Grand Cross of the Order of Merit (Portugal) in 1993.
