= List of international trips made by António Guterres as Secretary-General of the United Nations =

This is a list of international trips made by UN Secretary–General António Guterres. The list includes all travels outside of the Headquarters of the United Nations in New York City, United States. Guterres assumed office on January 1, 2017. He has visited 104 countries.

== Summary ==
Numbers of visits by Secretary–General Guterres per country, as of 16 March 2025
| No. of visits | Countries | |
|---|---|---|
| 1 | 53 | Afghanistan, Algeria, Angola, Antigua and Barbuda, Armenia, Bahamas, Bahrain, Burundi, Cabo Verde, Cambodia, Cameroon, Central African Republic, Costa Rica, Cyprus, Democratic Republic of the Congo, Dominica, Dominican Republic, Fiji, Finland, Ghana, Israel, Ivory Coast, Jamaica, Laos, Lebanon, Lesotho, Libya, Mali, Mongolia, Mozambique, Nepal, Netherlands, Niger, Nigeria, Norway, Palestine, Papua New Guinea, Saint Lucia, Saint Vincent and the Grenadines, Samoa, Senegal, Singapore, Suriname, Syria, Tanzania, Thailand, Timor-Leste, Togo, Tonga, Trinidad and Tobago, Tunisia, Tuvalu, Vanuatu |
| 2 | 22 | Argentina, Azerbaijan, Bangladesh, Barbados, Canada, Chile, Cuba, Denmark, Haiti, Malaysia, Moldova, Morocco, New Zealand, Pakistan, Philippines, Somalia, South Korea, Tajikistan, Uganda, Uzbekistan, Vatican City, Vietnam |
| 3 | 11 | Austria, Colombia, Kazakhstan, Kyrgyzstan, Indonesia, Iraq, Kuwait, Oman, South Africa, Sweden, Turkmenistan |
| 4 | 5 | Brazil, Jordan, Poland, Ukraine, United Arab Emirates |
| 5 | 4 | India, Kenya, Saudi Arabia, Spain |
| 6 | 2 | Russia, Turkey |
| 7 | 2 | Belgium, Japan |
| 8 | 3 | Egypt, Italy, United Kingdom |
| 9 | 2 | China, Qatar |
| 10 | 3 | Ethiopia, France, Portugal |
| 11 | 1 | Germany |
| 16 | 1 | United States |
| 32 | 1 | Switzerland |
| 288 | 105 | Total |

== 2017 ==
| Date | Countries | Places visited | Narrative |
|---|---|---|---|
| 11–13 January | Switzerland | Geneva | Participated in a conference on Cyprus. |
| 17–19 January | Switzerland | Geneva; Davos | Met with the president of the International Olympic Committee, Thomas Bach, Swiss Vice–President Alain Berset, and President & CCP General Secretary Xi Jinping of China. Attended the World Economic Forum, where he met with UK prime minister Theresa May, Nawaz Sharif, Prime Minister of Pakistan, Petro Poroshenko, President of Ukraine, and Mark Rutte, Prime Minister of the Netherlands. |
| 27–31 January | Ethiopia | Addis Ababa | Attended the African Union Summit, where he met with several heads of state in bilateral meetings. |
| 9–11 February | Turkey | Istanbul | Met with Turkish president Recep Tayyip Erdoğan and Prime Minister Binali Yıldırım. |
| 10–12 February | Saudi Arabia | Riyadh | Met with King Salman of Saudi Arabia and Deputy Crown Prince Mohammad bin Salman. |
| 12–14 February | United Arab Emirates | Dubai; Abu Dhabi | Attended the World Government Summit; met with UAE prime minister Mohammed bin Rashid Al Maktoum. |
| 14 February | Oman | Muscat | Met with Omani Deputy Prime Minister Fahd bin Mahmoud al Said. |
| 14–15 February | Qatar | Doha | Met with Sheikh Tamim bin Hamad Al Thani, Emir of Qatar. |
| 15–16 February | Egypt | Cairo | Met with Egyptian president Abdel Fattah el–Sisi and with Ahmed Aboul Gheit, Secretary General of the Arab League; delivered remarks at Cairo University. |
| 16–18 February | Germany | Bonn; Munich | Attended the meeting of foreign ministers of the G20; met with Federica Mogherini, High Representative of the Union for Foreign Affairs and Security Policy and held several bilateral meetings. Guterres then attended the Munich Security Conference, met with German chancellor Angela Merkel and held several bilateral meetings with heads of state. |
| 27 February | Switzerland | Geneva | Attended the opening of the opening session of the Human Rights Council, where he participated in several bilateral meetings and met with the president of the International Committee of the Red Cross, Peter Maurer. |
| 7 March | Somalia | Mogadishu; Baidoa | Met with President Mohamed Abdullahi Mohamed, and the president of the South West State of Somalia, Sharif Hassan Sheikh Aden He also visited a refugee camp. |
| 7–9 March | Kenya | Nairobi | Met with Kenyan President Uhuru Kenyatta; visited the Mathare slums. |
| 9 March | Tanzania | Dar es Salaam | Met with Tanzanian foreign minister Augustine Mahiga. |
| 27–30 March | Jordan | Amman | Visited Zaatari refugee camp and met with King Abdullah II of Jordan. He then attended the Summit of the Arab League. |
| 30–31 March | Iraq | Baghdad; Erbil | Met with Iraqi prime minister Haider al-Abadi. He then flew to Erbil where he met with the President of Kurdistan Region, Masoud Barzani and visited a refugee camp. |
| 4–5 April | Belgium | Brussels | Participated in a summit on supporting the future of Syria and the region. |
| 20–22 April | United States | Washington, D.C. | Met with President Donald Trump and attended the spring meeting of the International Monetary Fund. He also met with World Bank Group President Jim Yong Kim |
| 24–27 April | Switzerland | Zürich; Bern; Geneva; Montreux | Met with Swiss foreign minister Didier Burkhalter, President Doris Leuthard and Vice–President Alain Berset. |
| 6 May | United States | Columbia; North Charleston | Delivered the commencement address at University of South Carolina. He also met with Governor Henry McMaster and visited Boeing South Carolina. |
| 10–12 May | United Kingdom | London | Attended a conference on the situation in Somalia. |
| 13–16 May | China | Beijing | Attended the Belt and Road Forum for International Cooperation; met with Chinese premier Li Keqiang. |
| 16–17 May | France | Paris; Strasbourg | Met with French president Emmanuel Macron; addressed the European Parliament. |
| 17–16 May | Switzerland | Mont Pèlerin | Attended a conference. |
| 26–27 May | Italy | Taormina | Attended the 43rd G7 summit. |
| 1–3 June | Russia | Saint Petersburg | Attended the St. Petersburg International Economic Forum; met with Russian president Vladimir Putin. |
| 8–9 June | Kazakhstan | Astana | Attended the Shanghai Cooperation Organisation Heads of State Council; met with Kazakh president Nursultan Nazarbayev. |
| 9–10 June | Uzbekistan | Samarkand; Mo‘ynoq; Nukus | Met with President Shavkat Mirziyoyev and visited the Aral Sea and the Nukus Museum of Art. |
| 10–11 June | Kyrgyzstan | Bishkek; Osh | Met with President Almazbek Atambayev. |
| 11–12 June | Tajikistan | Dushanbe; Sarez Lake | Met with President Emomali Rahmon. He then flew to Sarez Lake where he addressed the threats due to the impacts of climate change. He also visited Darvoz District on the border to Afghanistan. |
| 12–14 June | Turkmenistan | Ashgabat | Met with President Gurbanguly Berdimuhamedow. |
| 14 June | Afghanistan | Kabul | Met with President Ashraf Ghani and chief executive Abdullah Abdullah. |
| 20–23 June | Uganda | Entebbe; Kampala; Arua District | Met with President Yoweri Museveni and visited the Imvepi Refugee Settlement. |
| 27–29 June | United States | Washington, D.C. | Met with members of the United States House of Representatives and members of the United States Senate. |
| 30 June – July 2 | Switzerland | Crans–Montana | Attended the Conference on Cyprus. |
| 3–4 July | Portugal | Lisbon | Attended a conference. |
| 6–7 July | Switzerland | Crans–Montana | Attended the Conference on Cyprus. |
| 7–8 July | Germany | Hamburg | Attended the 2017 G20 Hamburg summit |
| 8–10 July | Ukraine | Kyiv | Met with Ukrainian prime minister Volodymyr Groysman and President Petro Poroshenko. |
| 26–27 August | Kuwait | Kuwait City | Met with the Emir of Kuwait, Sabah Al-Ahmad Al-Jaber Al-Sabah. |
| 27–30 August | Israel | Jerusalem; Nahal Oz; Tel Aviv | Met with Prime Minister Benjamin Netanyahu and President Reuven Rivlin; visited the Yad Vashem memorial and the kibbutz Nahal Oz. |
| 29–30 August | Palestine | Ramallah; Gaza City; Beit Lahia | Met with Prime Minister Rami Hamdallah. |
| 7–8 October | Antigua and Barbuda | Saint John's; Cordington | Met with Prime Minister Gaston Browne and visited areas that were affected by Hurricane Irma. |
| 8 October | Dominica | Roseau | Met with Prime Minister Roosevelt Skerrit and visited areas that were affected by Hurricane Maria. |
| 19–20 October | United States | Washington, D.C. | Met with President Donald Trump. |
| 23–28 October | Central African Republic | Bangui; Bangassou | Met with President Faustin–Archange Touadéra and local politicians; visited MINUSCA. |
| 28 October | Cameroon | Yaoundé | Met with President Paul Biya. |
| 6 November | Portugal | Lisbon | Attended the Web Summit |
| 11–14 November | Philippines | Manila | Attended the ASEAN Summit. |
| 15–16 November | Germany | Bonn | Attended the 2017 United Nations Climate Change Conference. |
| 16–17 November | United Kingdom | London | Gave a lecture at SOAS University of London and met with UK officials. |
| 27–30 November | Ivory Coast | Abidjan | Attended the African Union–European Union Summit and met with President Alassane Ouattara. |
| 12 December | France | Paris | Attended the One Planet Summit. |
| 13–14 December | Japan | Tokyo | Met with Japanese prime minister Shinzō Abe. |
| 20–22 December | Netherlands | The Hague | Attended the closing ceremony of the International Criminal Tribunal for the former Yugoslavia; met with Prime Minister Mark Rutte and King Willem–Alexander of the Netherlands. |

== 2018 ==
| Date | Countries | Places visited | Narrative |
|---|---|---|---|
| 13–15 January | Colombia | Bogotá; Mesetas | Met with President Juan Manuel Santos and representatives of FARC. |
| 25 January | Togo | Lomé | Met with President Faure Gnassingbé. |
| 25–29 January | Ethiopia | Addis Ababa | Met with the Chairperson of the African Union Commission, Moussa Faki, and Ethiopian prime minister Hailemariam Desalegn; he also visited the African Union and held several bilateral meetings. |
| 6–10 February | South Korea | Seoul; Gangneung | Met with President Moon Jae-in; met his predecessor Ban Ki-moon at Yonsei University; visited the 2018 Winter Olympics. |
| 13–15 February | Kuwait | Kuwait City | Attended a conference on the reconstruction of Iraq, and met with Sheikh Sabah Al-Ahmad Al-Jaber Al-Sabah, Emir of Kuwait. |
| 15–16 February | Germany | Munich | Attended the Munich Security Conference. |
| 19 February | Portugal | Lisbon | Received a title of honorary doctor from the University of Lisbon. |
| 25–28 February | Switzerland | Geneva | Attended the opening session of the Human Rights Council and a segment of the Conference on Disarmament; held several bilateral meetings. |
| 15 March | Italy | Rome | Attended a conference for the financing UNRWA and a conference for support of Lebanon; met with Italian prime minister Paolo Gentiloni. |
| 16 March | Portugal | Lisbon | |
| 2–4 April | Switzerland | Geneva | Attended an event for the humanitarian crisis in Yemen. |
| 7–10 April | China | Beijing; Bo'ao | Met with President & CCP General Secretary Xi Jinping and Premier Li Keqiang; attended the Boao Forum for Asia. |
| 15–18 April | Saudi Arabia | Riyadh | Met with King Salman of Saudi Arabia and Crown Prince Mohammad bin Salman. |
| 20–23 April | Sweden | Backåkra; Uppsala; Stockholm | Visited Backåkra, the farm of former UN secretary-general Dag Hammarskjöld; met with Swedish prime minister Stefan Löfven and Crown Princess Victoria. |
| 2–4 May | United Kingdom | London | Met with UK prime minister Theresa May and Foreign Secretary Boris Johnson. |
| 7–8 May | Cuba | Havana | Met with President Miguel Díaz-Canel and the First Secretary of the Communist Party, Raúl Castro; attended the session of the United Nations Economic Commission for Latin America and the Caribbean; visited Old Havana. |
| 14–15 May | Austria | Vienna | Met with Chancellor Sebastian Kurz and President Alexander Van der Bellen. |
| 15–16 May | Belgium | Brussels | Met with the president of the European Council, Donald Tusk, the president of the European Commission, Jean-Claude Juncker, and with Belgian prime minister Charles Michel. |
| 16–19 May | United States | Washington, D.C. | Met with President Donald Trump and US legislators. |
| 24–25 May | Switzerland | Geneva | Visited the University of Geneva. |
| 29 May | Portugal | Lisbon | Addressed the Council of State. |
| 29–31 May | Mali | Bamako; Mopti | Visited troops from the MINUSMA; met with President Ibrahim Boubacar Keïta. |
| 9 June | Canada | La Malbaie | Attended the 44th G7 summit |
| 18 June | Finland | Helsinki | Attended the Kultaranta talks and met with President Sauli Niinistö. |
| 18–19 June | Norway | Oslo | Met with Norwegian prime minister Erna Solberg and Somalian prime minister Hassan Ali Khaire. |
| 19–21 June | Russia | Moscow | Audience with Patriarch Kirill of Moscow; attended the 2018 FIFA World Cup game between Portugal and Morocco; met with Russian president Vladimir Putin. |
| 23 June | United States | Washington, D.C. | Met with US Secretary of State Mike Pompeo. |
| 1–3 July | Bangladesh | Dhaka; Cox's Bazar | Visit in solidarity with the Rohingya refugees in Bangladesh; visited Kutupalong refugee camp; met with Prime Minister Sheikh Hasina. |
| 9 July | Ethiopia | Addis Ababa | Attended the United Nations–African Union conference; met with Ethiopian prime minister Abiy Ahmed. |
| 16–17 July | Costa Rica | San José | Met with President Carlos Alvarado Quesada. |
| 7–9 August | Japan | Tokyo; Nagasaki | Met with Prime Minister Shinzō Abe; met with the mayors of Nagasaki and Hiroshima; visited the Nagasaki Atomic Bomb Museum. |
| 2–4 September | China | Beijing | Met with Chinese president & CCP General Secretary Xi Jinping, the Chairperson of the African Union Commission, Moussa Faki, Angolan President João Lourenço, and Ivorian president Alassane Ouattara. |
| 12–13 September | Ghana | Accra | Attended the funeral of former UN secretary-general Kofi Annan; met with Ghanaian president Nana Akufo-Addo. |
| 16–17 September | Saudi Arabia | Jeddah | Met with King Salman of Saudi Arabia and Crown Prince Mohammad bin Salman. |
| 1–4 October | India | New Delhi; Amritsar | Laid a wreath in honour of Mahatma Gandhi; met with Prime Minister Narendra Modi and President Ram Nath Kovind; visited the Golden Temple. |
| 10–14 October | Indonesia | Denpasar; Palu | Met with President Joko Widodo; attended the World Bank–International Monetary Fund annual meeting; visited Sulawesi where an earthquake and tsunami had struck the region. |
| 23–24 October | United States | Washington, D.C. | Met with US Secretary of State Mike Pompeo. |
| 5–6 November | Portugal | Lisbon | Attended the Web Summit. |
| 10–12 November | France | Paris | Attended the commemorating events of Armistice Day and participated in the Paris Peace Forum; met with Turkish president Recep Tayyip Erdoğan, German chancellor Angela Merkel, and French president Emmanuel Macron, visited UNESCO headquarters. |
| 13–14 November | United States | Washington, D.C. | Attended the ceremony where the Templeton Prize was awarded to King Abdullah II of Jordan. |
| 29 November – 1 December | Argentina | Buenos Aires | Attended the 2018 G20 Buenos Aires summit. |
| 2–4 December | Poland | Katowice | Met with President Andrzej Duda; attended the 2018 United Nations Climate Change Conference. |
| 9–11 December | Morocco | Marrakesh; Rabat | Attended the Intergovernmental Conference to Adopt the Global Compact for Safe, Orderly and Regular Migration; met with King Mohammed VI of Morocco. |
| 11–12 December | Poland | Katowice | Attended the 2018 United Nations Climate Change Conference. |
| 12–13 December | Sweden | Rimbo | Attended the intra–Yemeni consultations. |
| 13–15 December | Poland | Katowice | Attended the 2018 United Nations Climate Change Conference. |
| 15–17 December | Qatar | Doha | Met with Sheikh Tamim bin Hamad Al Thani; spoke at Hamad Bin Khalifa University. |

== 2019 ==
| Date | Countries | Places visited | Narrative |
|---|---|---|---|
| 23–25 January | Switzerland | Davos | Attended the World Economic Forum. |
| 8–11 February | Ethiopia | Addis Ababa | Met with Chair of the African Union Commission Moussa Faki, Prime Minister of Norway Erna Solberg, President of Rwanda Paul Kagame, President of Egypt Abdel Fattah el–Sisi, Prime Minister of Ethiopia Abiy Ahmed Ali and other senior African leaders. |
| 24–26 February | Switzerland | Geneva | Attended the Human Rights Council, a Pledging Conference on Yemen and the Conference on Disarmament. Also met Swiss foreign minister Ignazio Cassis and Prime Minister of Yemen Maeen Abdulmalik Saeed. |
| 13–14 March | United States | Washington, D.C. | Met with National Security Adviser John Bolton and United States Secretary of State Michael Pompeo. |
| 20–21 March | Argentina | Buenos Aires | Attended the Second High–level United Nations Conference on South–South Cooperation and met with President of Argentina Mauricio Macri and President of Chile Sebastián Piñera |
| 30 March–1 April | Tunisia | Tunis | Met with Prime Minister of Tunisia Youssef Chahed, President of Iraq Barham Salih and President of Tunisia Beji Caid Essebsi. |
| 1–3 April | Egypt | Cairo | Met with President of Egypt Abdel Fattah el–Sisi and Egyptian foreign minister Sameh Shoukry. |
| 3–5 April | Libya | Tripoli; Tobruk; Benghazi | Met with Prime Minister of the Government of National Accord Fayez al–Sarraj and Chairman of the High Council of State of Libya Khalid al–Mishri. Also visited Ain Zara Detention Centre. Met with General Khalifa Haftar. |
| 5–7 April | Jordan | Amman | Met with King Abdullah II of Jordan, Queen Rania of Jordan, chief executive of Afghanistan Abdullah Abdullah and President of Armenia Armen Sarkissian. Also gave a speech at World Economic Forum on the Middle East and North Africa. |
| 25–27 April | China | Beijing | Spoke at second Belt and Road Forum for International Cooperation, met with President of Uzbekistan Shavkat Mirziyoyev, President of China & CCP General Secretary Xi Jinping and other senior Chinese leaders. |
| 7–10 May | Switzerland | Geneva | Attended the Chief Executives board of the United Nations system at the International Labour Organization. |
| 12–14 May | New Zealand | Auckland, Christchurch | Met with Prime Minister of New Zealand Jacinda Ardern and visited the Al–Noor Mosque where he respects to the victims of the Christchurch mosque shootings. |
| 14–18 May | Fiji | Suva | Attended the Pacific Islands Forum. Met with the president of Fiji, Jioji Konrote and Prime Minister Frank Bainimarama. |
| 17 May | Tuvalu | Funafuti | Met with Prime Minister Enele Sopoaga. |
| 18 May | Vanuatu | Port Vila | Met with President Tallis Obed Moses and Prime Minister Charlot Salwai. |
| 27–28 May | Austria | Vienna | Attended the 40th anniversary celebrations of the Vienna International Centre; met with Austrian president Alexander Van der Bellen. |
| 28–30 May | Germany | Aachen | Received the Charlemagne Prize and addressed students of RWTH Aachen University. |
| 30–31 May | Switzerland | Glion | Attended a retreat with special representatives. |
| 6–8 June | Russia | Saint Petersburg | Attended the St. Petersburg International Economic Forum and met with Russian president Vladimir Putin and other heads of state. |
| 21 June | Switzerland | Geneva | Attended a conference of the International Labour Organization. |
| 21–24 June | Portugal | Lisbon | Met with Prime Minister António Costa and attended the World Conference for Ministers Responsible for Youth. |
| 26–29 June | Japan | Osaka | Attended the 2019 G20 Osaka summit. |
| 29 June–1 July | United Arab Emirates | Abu Dhabi | Attended a meeting in preparation for the 2019 UN Climate Action Summit. |
| 3–4 July | Saint Lucia | Gros Islet Quarter; Praslin Quarter | Met with Prime Minister Allen Chastanet at Rodney Bay; attended the 40th CARICOM Heads of Government conference. |
| 8–11 July | Kenya | Nairobi | Attended a conference on counter–terrorism preventing violent extremism; met with Kenyan President Uhuru Kenyatta and with Moussa Faki, Chairperson of the African Union Commission. |
| 11–13 July | Mozambique | Maputo; Beira | Met with Mozambican president Filipe Nyusi; visited areas affected by Cyclone Idai. |
| 25–26 August | France | Biarritz | Attended the 45th G7 summit |
| 27–30 August | Japan | Yokohama | Attended the Tokyo International Conference on African Development; met bilateral meetings with Japanese prime minister Shinzo Abe, Nigerien President Mahamadou Issoufou, Kenyan President Uhuru Kenyatta, Burkinese president Roch Marc Christian Kaboré, Egyptian president Abdel Fattah el–Sisi, and Mauritian prime minister Pravind Jugnauth. |
| 30 August–2 September | Democratic Republic of the Congo | Goma; Beni; Kinshasa | Met with MONUSCO troops; visited an Ebola treatment center in the city of Mangina; met with President Félix Tshisekedi and Prime Minister Sylvestre Ilunga. |
| 13–14 September | Bahamas | Nassau; Marsh Harbour | Visited areas affected by Hurricane Dorian and met with Prime Minister Hubert Minnis. |
| 9–11 October | Denmark | Copenhagen | Visited UN City; attended the C40 World Mayor Summit; met with Danish prime minister Mette Frederiksen. |
| 19 October | United States | Washington, D.C. | Attended the annual meeting of the World Bank Group and the International Monetary Fund. |
| 30 October–1 November | Turkey | Istanbul | Met with Foreign Minister Mevlüt Çavuşoğlu and President Recep Tayyip Erdoğan and talked about Cyprus and Syria. |
| 2–4 November | Thailand | Bangkok | Met with Vietnamese prime minister Nguyễn Xuân Phúc, President Joko Widodo of Indonesia and Thai prime minister Prayut Chan–o–cha. |
| 11–12 November | France | Paris | Attended the Paris Peace Forum and met with President Emmanuel Macron. |
| 25–27 November | Germany | Berlin | Met with Greek and Turkish Cypriot Leaders, President Frank–Walter Steinmeier and Chancellor Angela Merkel. |
| 30 November–3 December | Spain | Madrid | Attended the 2019 United Nations Climate Change Conference and met Spanish prime minister Pedro Sánchez. |
| 11–15 December | Spain | Madrid | Attended the 2019 United Nations Climate Change Conference. |
| 15–17 December | Switzerland | Geneva | Attended the Global Refugee Forum; met with heads of states and other officials. |
| 17–20 December | Italy | Rome; Brindisi | Met with President Sergio Mattarella and Prime Minister Giuseppe Conte; visited the United Nations Global Service Centre. |
| 20 December | Vatican City | Vatican City | Had an audience with Pope Francis. |

== 2020 ==
| Date | Countries | Places visited | Narrative |
|---|---|---|---|
| 11 January | Portugal | Lisbon | Attended the kick–off ceremony for Lisbon's year as European Green Capital. |
| 13–14 January | France | Pau | Attended a summit with the leaders of France, Burkina Faso, Chad, Mali, Mauritania and Niger. |
| 18–20 January | Germany | Berlin | Attended the Libya Conference; met with Italian prime minister Giuseppe Conte, and German chancellor Angela Merkel. |
| 23–24 January | Switzerland | Davos | Attended the World Economic Forum annual meeting. |
| 6–10 February | Ethiopia | Addis Ababa | Attended several bilateral meetings with African heads of states. |
| 16–19 February | Pakistan | Islamabad; Lahore; Kartarpur | Met with refugees from Afghanistan and attended a conference on hosting Afghan refugees; met with Prime Minister Imran Khan; visited the Kartarpur Corridor. |
| 23–25 February | Switzerland | Geneva | Attended the opening of the 43rd Session of the Human Rights Council, and met with High Commissioner for Human Rights, Michelle Bachelet; met with WHO Director–General Tedros Adhanom. |
| 17–18 December | Germany | Berlin | Met with German foreign minister Heiko Maas and President Frank–Walter Steinmeier; delivered a speech to the Bundestag. |

== 2021 ==
| Date | Countries | Places visited | Narrative |
|---|---|---|---|
| 26–29 April | Switzerland | Geneva | Attended the 5+1 meeting on the Cyprus dispute. |
| 11–14 May | Russia | Moscow | Met with Russian president Vladimir Putin and Prime Minister Mikhail Mishustin. |
| 11–13 June | United Kingdom | London; Carbis Bay | Attended the 47th G7 summit; met with British prime minister Boris Johnson. |
| 22–25 June | Belgium | Brussels | Met with the president of the European Commission, Ursula von der Leyen and addressed the European Parliament; met with Belgian prime minister Alexander De Croo and had an audience with Philippe of Belgium. |
| 29 June–1 July | France | Paris | Met with President Emmanuel Macron and attended the Generation Equality Forum. |
| 1–2 July | Spain | Quart de Poblet; Valencia; Madrid | Visited the United Nations Information and Communications Technology Facility with Spanish foreign minister Arancha González Laya; held meetings with Prime Minister Pedro Sánchez and King Felipe VI. |
| 12–14 September | Switzerland | Geneva | António Guterres arrived in Geneva, Switzerland, on Sunday, 12 September, for a short trip during which he would chair the high‑level event on the humanitarian situation in Afghanistan that he had recently convened. |
| 2–4 October | Barbados | Bridgetown | António Guterres arrived in Barbados on Saturday, 2 October, for a two–day visit to take part in the opening ceremony of the fifteenth United Nations Conference on Trade and Development, known as UNCTAD15. |
| 28–31 October | Italy | Rome | Attended the G20 summit. |
| 31 October–4 November | United Kingdom | Glasgow; Cambridge | Attended the 2021 United Nations Climate Change Conference; visited the University of Cambridge. |
| 10–13 November | United Kingdom | Glasgow | Attended the 2021 United Nations Climate Change Conference |
| 22–24 November | Colombia | Bogotá; Dabeiba; Apartadó | Met with President Iván Duque |

== 2022 ==
| Date | Countries | Places visited | Narrative |
|---|---|---|---|
| 3–6 February | China | Beijing | Attended the opening ceremony of the 2022 Winter Olympics. |
| 17–18 February | Germany | Munich | Attended the Munich Security Conference. |
| 25 April | Turkey | Ankara | Met with President Recep Tayyip Erdoğan. |
| 25–26 April | Russia | Moscow | Met with President Vladimir Putin and Foreign Minister Sergey Lavrov to discuss the 2022 Russian invasion of Ukraine. |
| 26 April | Poland | Rzeszów | Met with President Andrzej Duda to discuss the 2022 Ukrainian refugee crisis. |
| 26–29 April | Ukraine | Kyiv; Borodianka; Bucha; Irpin | Visited three towns gravely affected by the 2022 Russian invasion of Ukraine, including the site of the Bucha massacre. Met with President Volodymyr Zelenskyy and Prime Minister Denys Shmyhal. |
| 30 April–1 May | Senegal | Dakar | Met with President Macky Sall. |
| 1–3 May | Niger | Niamey; Ouallam | Met with President Mohamed Bazoum, and visited Ouallam, a town where refugees from Mali live. |
| 3–4 May | Nigeria | Maiduguri; Abuja | Met with President Muhammadu Buhari. |
| 9–10 May | Moldova | Chișinău | Met with President Natalia Gavrilița and Prime Minister Maia Sandu. |
| 10–13 May | Austria | Vienna | Met with President Alexander Van der Bellen and Chancellor Karl Nehammer; Met with the director–General of the International Atomic Energy Agency, Rafael Grossi; Attended meetings at the United Nations Office at Vienna |
| 1–3 June | Sweden | Stockholm; Uppsala | Met with Prime Minister Magdalena Andersson and King Carl XVI Gustaf; Visited the gravesite of former UN Secretary–General Dag Hammarskjöld; Attended the Stockholm+50 conference |
| 9–10 June | United States | Los Angeles | Attended the 9th Summit of the Americas; Visited the gravesite of former UN Secretary–General Dag Hammarskjöld; Held bilateral meetings with the president of Costa Rica, Rodrigo Chaves Robles, and the president of Argentina, Alberto Fernández. |
| 24–28 June | Portugal | Lisbon | Attended the United Nations Ocean Conference; Met with Portuguese prime minister António Costa |
| 1–4 July | Suriname | Pierrekondre; Paramaribo; Weg naar Zee | Visited the indigenous village of Pierrekondre and met with the community of Kalina people; Visited the Anton de Kom University; Visited the mangrove rehabilitation site in Weg naar Zee; Met with the president of Suriname, Chan Santokhi; Attended he opening of the CARICOM conference |
| 21–22 July | Turkey | Istanbul | Attended the signing ceremony of the Black Sea Grain Initiative; Met with the Minister for Infrastructure of Ukraine, Oleksandr Kubrakov; Met with Russian Defense Minister Sergei Shoigu; Met with Turkish president Recep Tayyip Erdoğan |
| 5–8 August | Japan | Hiroshima; Tokyo | Met with Japanese prime minister Fumio Kishida and Foreign Minister Yoshimasa Hayashi; Met with the mayors of Hiroshima, Kazumi Matsui, and Nagasaki, Tomihisa Taue; Visited the Hiroshima Peace Memorial Museum; Had an audience with Emperor Naruhito |
| 8–11 August | Mongolia | Ulaanbaatar | Met with President Ukhnaagiin Khürelsükh and Foreign Minister Battsetseg Batmunkh; Attended a mini Naadam festival in his honour and met with a nomadic family |
| 11–12 August | South Korea | Seoul | Met with President Yoon Suk–yeol and Foreign Minister Park Jin |
| 17–19 August | Ukraine | Lviv; Vinnytsia; Odesa | Met with Ukrainian president Volodymyr Zelenskyy and Turkish president Recep Tayyip Erdoğan; Visited the University of Lviv; Met with Ukrainian Minister of Infrastructure Oleksandr Kubrakov in Odesa, and boarded a ship loading up wheat, only 19 days after the first ship was able to leave the port again due to the Black Sea Grain Initiative. |
| 19 August | Moldova | Chișinău | Met with President Maia Sandu |
| 19–20 August | Turkey | Istanbul | |
| 9–11 September | Pakistan | Islamabad, Balochistan, Larkana, Sukkur, Karachi | Met with Prime Minister Shehbaz Sharif und Foreign Minister Bilawal Bhutto Zardari; Visited areas impacted by the 2022 Pakistan floods |
| 18–20 October | India | Mumbai, Kevadia, Modhera | Participated in a United Nations Day Public Lecture.; Met with Prime Minister Narendra Modi, and also participated in the launch of the Lifestyles for the Environment initiative |
| 21–23 October | Vietnam | Hanoi | Met with State President, Nguyen Xuan Phuc and visited President Ho Chi Minh's stilt house.; Secretary–General met with General Secretary of the Communist Party, Nguyen Phu Trong, the top leader of Vietnam.; Secretary–General had a meeting with the president of the National Assembly, Vuong Dinh Hue and Prime Minister Pham Minh Chinh.; Visited the Vietnam's Meteorological and Hydrological Administration.; Participated in a dialogue with Vietnamese youth and student's representatives.; Visited the Temple of Literature, the Imperial Citadel of Thăng Long and Hoàn Kiếm Lake. |
| 1–2 November | Algeria | Algiers | Secratry had bilateral meetings with the Abdel Fattah al–Sisi (Egyptian president), Hassan Sheikh Mohamud (Somalian president) and Abdelmadjid Tebboune (Algerian president).; Guterres attended and addressed the opening session of the Summit of the League of Arab States. |
| 6–9 November | Egypt | Sharm El Sheikh | Attended the 2022 United Nations Climate Change Conference; Met with Shehbaz Sharif, Prime Minister of Pakistan, Giorgia Meloni, Prime Minister of Italy, Alexander Van der Bellen, Federal president of Austria, and Ulf Kristersson, Prime Minister of Sweden |
| 11–14 November | Cambodia | Phnom Penh | Guterres joined to the 12th Summit between the UN and the 10–member Association of Southeast Asian Nations (ASEAN).; Met with Lee Hsien Loong, Prime Minister of Singapore, Prayut Chan–o–cha, Prime Minister of Thailand, Joko Widodo, President of Indonesia, Hun Sen, Prime Minister of Cambodia, and Li Keqiang, Premier of China.; Had an audience with Cambodian King Norodom Sihamoni; Visited the Tuol Sleng Genocide Museum |
| 14 November | Malaysia | Kuala Lumpur | Held a virtual meeting with Malaysian foreign minister Saifuddin Abdullah |
| 14–16 November | Indonesia | Nusa Dua | Attended the 2022 G20 Bali summit; Met with Chinese president and CCP general secretary Xi Jinping |
| 17–19 November | Egypt | Sharm El Sheikh | Attended the 2022 United Nations Climate Change Conference; Met with Brazilian president–elect Luiz Inácio Lula da Silva |
| 19–20 November | Qatar | Doha, Al Khor | Attended the opening game of the 2022 FIFA World Cup |
| 21–23 November | Morocco | Fez, Rabat | Attended the ninth Global Forum of the United Nations Alliance of Civilizations; Met with King Mohammed VI of Morocco |
| 29 November–2 December | Ethiopia | Addis Ababa | Attended the sixth African Union–United Nations annual conference; Met with the Chairperson of the African Union, Moussa Faki; Met with the prime minister of Ethiopia, Abiy Ahmed |
| 5–7 December | Canada | Montreal | Attended the 2022 United Nations Biodiversity Conference; Met with Canadian prime minister Justin Trudeau |
| 13 December | United States | Washington, D.C. | Met with the chairman of the Senate Committee on Foreign Relations, Senator Bob Menendez; Met with Senator Jim Risch; Met with President pro tempore of the United States Senate, Senator Patrick Leahy |

== 2023 ==
| Date | Countries | Places visited | Narrative |
|---|---|---|---|
| 9 January | Switzerland | Geneva | Co–hosted the International Conference on Climate Resilient Pakistan with the prime minister of Pakistan, Shehbaz Sharif |
| 17–20 January | Switzerland | Davos, Yverdon–les–Bains | Attended the World Economic Forum; Met with Swiss president Alain Berset |
| 21–23 January | Cabo Verde | Mindelo, Santo Antão | Met with the prime minister of Cabo Verde, Ulisses Correia e Silva, and President José Maria Neves; Attended the Ocean Summit; Visited pavilions at the 2023 Ocean Race stopover |
| 16–19 February | Ethiopia | Addis Ababa | Attended the 36th session of the Assembly and Heads of State and Government of the African Union; Met with Rwandan President Paul Kagame, Namibian president Hage Geingob, South African president Cyril Ramaphosa, Burundian president Évariste Ndayishimiye, and Comorian president Azali Assoumani |
| 27–28 February | Switzerland | Geneva | Attended the 52nd session of the Human Rights Council; Met with the prime minister of Yemen, Maeen Abdulmalik Saeed, the president of Montenegro, Milo Đukanović, and the president of the Democratic Republic of the Congo, Félix Tshisekedi |
| 1–2 March | Iraq | Baghdad, Qayyarah, Erbil | Met with Iraqi prime minister Mohammed Shia' Al Sudani and Iraqi president Abdul Latif Rashid; Visited the Iraq Museum; Visited Jeddah Rehabilitation and Reintegration Centre, which houses Iraqis that have been repatriated from Al–Hawl refugee camp in Syria; Met with the president of the Kurdistan Region, Nechirvan Barzani |
| 3–5 March | Qatar | Doha | Attended the Summit of the least developed countries; Visited the Al Jazeera headquarters; Met with Deputy Qatari Prime Minister Mohammed bin Abdulrahman bin Jassim Al Thani and the emir of Qatar, Tamim bin Hamad Al Thani; Met with the prime minister of Bhutan, Lotay Tshering, the president of Malawi, Lazarus Chakwera, the president of Zambia, Hakainde Hichilema, the prime minister of Bangladesh, Sheikh Hasina, and the president of the Maldives, Ibrahim Mohamed Solih |
| 6–9 March | Ukraine | Kyiv | Met with President Volodymyr Zelenskyy |
| 23 March | Belgium | Brussels | Attended a session with members of the European Council; Met with the president of the European Council, Charles Michel |
| 11–12 April | Somalia | Mogadishu, Baidoa | Met with the president of Somalia, Hassan Sheikh Mohamud; Visited a refugee camp |
| 26–28 April | United States | Washington, D.C. | Met with United States Senators Patty Murray and Susan Collins; Met with United States Representative Mario Díaz–Balart, Rosa DeLauro, Gregory Meeks, Michael McCaul, and Chris Smith; Met with United States Secretary of State, Antony Blinken; Visited the National Museum of African American History and Culture |
| 1–2 May | Qatar | Doha | Hosted a meeting with special envoys on Afghanistan |
| 2–5 May | Kenya | Nairobi | Met with United Nations senior leadership in Nairobi; Met with Kenyan President William Ruto |
| 5–6 May | Burundi | Bujumbura | Attended the 11th high–level meeting of the Regional Oversight Mechanism of the Peace, Security and Cooperation Framework for the Democratic Republic of the Congo and the region; Met with Burundian president Évariste Ndayishimiye; Met with the president of the Democratic Republic of the Congo, Félix Tshisekedi |
| 7–9 May | Spain | Madrid, Cuacos de Yuste | Met with Spanish prime minister Pedro Sánchez; Attended a dinner hosted by Spanish King Felipe VI; Received the Charles V European Award |
| 10 May | United States | Washington, D.C. | Attended the Kuwait–America Foundation Annual Gala Dinner |
| 14–15 May | Jamaica | Kingston, Saint Ann Parish | Met with Jamaican prime minister Andrew Holness; Visited the Seville Great House and Heritage Park; Visited the Bob Marley Museum |
| 18–21 May | Japan | Hiroshima | Attended the 49th G7 summit; Held bilateral meetings with Fumio Kishida, Prime Minister of Japan, Justin Trudeau, Prime Minister of Canada, Luiz Inácio Lula da Silva, President of Brazil |
| 20–23 June | France | Paris | Met with French president Emmanuel Macron; Attended the Summit for a New Global Financing Pact; Met with the president of Sri Lanka, Ranil Wickremesinghe, Macky Sall, President of Senegal, Idriss Déby, President of Chad; Visited Sciences Po |
| 1 July | Haiti | Port–au–Prince | Met with Prime Minister Ariel Henry |
| 1–2 July | United States | Fort Lauderdale, Miami | Spent the night in Florida |
| 2–4 July | Trinidad and Tobago | Port of Spain, Arima | Visited the Asa Wright Nature Centre; Visited Maracas Bay; Met with the prime minister of Trinidad and Tobago, Keith Rowley; Met with the prime minister of the Republic of Korea, Han Duck–soo; Attended the 45th Regular Meeting of the Conference of the Heads of Government of the Caribbean Community |
| 13–14 July | Belgium | Brussels | Met with Prime Minister Alexander De Croo; Met with King Philippe of Belgium and Queen Mathilde of Belgium; Met with the president of the European Commission, Ursula von der Leyen |
| 24–25 July | Italy | Rome | Attended the UN Food Systems Summit; Met with the president of Sierra Leone, Julius Maada Bio, the prime minister of Nepal, Pushpa Kamal Dahal, the president of Armenia, Vahagn Khachaturyan, and Italian prime minister Giorgia Meloni; Met with Italian president Sergio Mattarella |
| 22–25 August | South Africa | Johannesburg | Attended the BRICS–Africa outreach; Met with South African president Cyril Ramaphosa; Met with the president of Burundi, Évariste Ndayishimiye; Met with Russian foreign minister Sergey Lavrov |
| 4–5 September | Kenya | Nairobi | Met with President William Ruto; Met with UN envoys in the region; Attended the Africa Climate Summit; Met with the president of the African Development Bank, Akinwumi Adesina, and the president of Ghana, Nana Akufo–Addo |
| 6–8 September | Indonesia | Jakarta | Attended the 2023 ASEAN Summit; Met with Indonesian president Joko Widodo, the premier of China, Li Qiang, and the prime minister of Malaysia, Anwar Ibrahim |
| 8–11 September | India | New Delhi | Attended the 2023 G20 New Delhi summit |
| 14–15 September | Cuba | Havana | Attended the G77+China Summit; Met with Cuban president and first secretary Miguel Díaz–Canel and former first secretary of the Communist Party Raúl Castro; Met with Venezuelan president Nicolás Maduro |
| 17–18 October | China | Beijing | Attended the 2023 Belt and Road Forum; Met with Chinese president and CCP general secretary Xi Jinping, director of the Foreign Affairs Wang Yi; Met with the president of Vietnam, Võ Văn Thưởng |
| 19–22 October | Egypt | Cairo, Arish, Rafah | Visited Egypt on a humanitarian mission and called for an immediate humanitarian ceasefire in the Gaza war; Visited El Arish International Airport, the main air hub for Gaza–bound humanitarian aid; Visited the Rafah Border Crossing; Met with Egyptian president Abdel Fattah el–Sisi and Foreign Minister Sameh Shoukry |
| 28 October | Qatar | Doha | Met with Egyptian president Abdel Fattah el–Sisi; Met with the prime minister of Qatar, Sheikh Mohammed bin Abdulrahman bin Jassim Al Thani |
| 28 October–1 November | Nepal | Kathmandu, Lalitpur | Met with Nepalese president Ram Chandra Poudel, Prime Minister Pushpa Kamal Dahal, and other state officials; Visited the historic area Patan Durbar Square; Flew over the Everest region, including Imja Lake; Visited Annapurna Base Camp; Visited Lumbini, the birthplace of The Buddha |
| 1–2 November | United Kingdom | London | Attended the Summit on Artificial Intelligence Safety; Met with UK prime minister Rishi Sunak; Met with US vice president Kamala Harris, German vice–chancellor Robert Habeck, and the president of the European Commission, Ursula von der Leyen |
| 21–26 November | Chile | Santiago, Punta Arenas; Magallanes Region | Visited the offices of United Nations Economic Commission for Latin America and the Caribbean; Met with Chilean foreign minister Alberto van Klaveren; Travelled to Antarctica with Chilean president Gabriel Boric; Visited Base Presidente Eduardo Frei Montalva and Base General Bernardo O'Higgins Riquelme |
| 29 November–4 December | United Arab Emirates | Dubai | Attended the 2023 United Nations Climate Change Conference and met with COP28 President Sultan Al Jaber; Met with Sheikh Mohamed bin Zayed Al Nahyan, President of the United Arab Emirates; Narendra Modi, Prime Minister of India; Ding Xuexiang, First Vice Premier of China; Luiz Inácio Lula da Silva, President of Brazil; Miguel Díaz–Canel, First Secretary and President of Cuba; Alexander Van der Bellen, President of Austria; Cyril Ramaphosa; Joko Widodo, President of Indonesia; Abdul Latif Rashid, President of Iraq; Hakainde Hichilema, President of Zambia. |
| 9–10 December | Qatar | Doha | Met with Moza bint Nasser, Chairperson of the Qatar Foundation; Attended the Doha Forum; Met the Emir of Qatar, Tamim bin Hamad Al Thani, and Prime Minister Mohammed bin Abdulrahman bin Jassim Al Thani |
| 10–13 December | United Arab Emirates | Dubai | Attended the 2023 United Nations Climate Change Conference |

== 2024 ==
| Date | Countries | Places visited | Narrative |
|---|---|---|---|
| 15–18 January | Switzerland | Davos | Attended the World Economic Forum; Met with Bisher Khasawneh, Prime Minister of Jordan; Najib Mikati, caretaker Prime Minister of Lebanon; Viola Amherd, President of Switzerland; Andrzej Duda, President of Poland; and Mohammed Shia' Al Sudani, Prime Minister of Iraq |
| 19–21 January | Uganda | Kampala | Attended the Summit of the Non–Aligned Movement; Attended the 3rd South Summit of the Group of 77 and China; Met with Kassim Majaliwa, Prime Minister of Tanzania; Yoweri Museveni, and President of Uganda |
| 14–16 February | Germany | Munich | Attended the Munich Security Conference; Visited the Ohel Jakob synagogue; Held bilateral meetings with the high representative of the European Union for foreign affairs and security policy, Josep Borrell, the president of the Kurdistan Region of Iraq, Nechirvan Barzani, and the prime minister of Slovenia, Robert Golob |
| 17–20 February | Qatar | Doha | Attended a meeting of Special Envoys on Afghanistan; Held a bilateral meeting with the prime minister and minister of foreign affairs of Qatar, Mohammed bin Abdulrahman bin Jassim Al Thani |
| 25–26 February | Switzerland | Geneva | Attended the opening of the High–level segment of the 55th session of the Human Rights Council; Met with the Foreign Ministers of Finland, Iran, Jordan, Kazakhstan, Kuwait and Vietnam |
| 29 February–4 March | Saint Vincent and the Grenadines | Kingstown, Mustique | Met with President Ralph Gonsalves; Attended the Summit of the Community of Latin American and Caribbean States; Held bilateral meetings with Luiz Inácio Lula da Silva, President of Brazil, and Javier González Olaechea, Minister of Foreign Affairs of Peru; Visited several sites of the 2021 eruption of La Soufrière volcano |
| 19–22 March | Belgium | Brussels | Met with the president of the European Commission, Ursula von der Leyen, the president of the European Council, Charles Michel, the president of the European Parliament, Roberta Metsola, and the president of Cyprus, Nikos Christodoulides; Attended a working lunch with Heads of State and Government of the European Union |
| 22–24 March | Egypt | Cairo, Arish, Rafah | Met with the Governor of North Sinai, Mohamed Abdel–Fadil; Visited a hospital where injured Palestinians were getting treatment; Visited the Rafah Border Crossing and met with humanitarian workers; Attended Iftar in Cairo with refugees from Sudan; Met with the Egyptian president Abdel Fattah el–Sisi |
| 24–25 March | Jordan | Amman | Visited the Al–Wehdat refugee camp; Met with King Abdullah II of Jordan, and Minister of Foreign Affairs, Ayman Safadi |
| 1–6 May | Chile | Santiago | Attended a biannual session meeting of the heads of UN systems, the Chief Executives Board for Coordination (CEB); Met with the president of Chile, Gabriel Boric |
| 9–11 May | Kenya | Nairobi | Attended the United Nations Civil Society Conference in Support of the Summit of the Future; Met with Kenyan President William Ruto |
| 12–13 May | Kuwait | Kuwait City | Met with Emir Mishal Al–Ahmad Al–Jaber Al–Sabah and Prime Minister Ahmad Al–Abdullah Al–Sabah; Visited the Al Salam Palace Museum |
| 13–15 May | Oman | Muscat, Ad Dakhiliyah | Met with Sultan Haitham bin Tariq; Visited the National Museum; Visited the Jebel Akhdar Mountains |
| 15–17 May | Bahrain | Manama | Attended the Arab League Summit; Met with the Secretary–General of the Arab League, Ahmed Aboul Gheit; Held bilateral meetings with the prime minister of Lebanon, Najib Mikati, the crown prince of Saudi Arabia, Mohammed bin Salman, King Abdullah II of Jordan, King Hamad bin Isa Al Khalifa of Bahrain, and the president of the Presidential Council of Libya, Mohamed al–Menfi |
| 10–11 June | Jordan | Amman, Sweimeh | Attended the conference on humanitarian aid for Gaza at the King Hussein Bin Talal Convention Centre; Met with the prime minister of Spain, Pedro Sánchez, the president of the European Council, Charles Michel, the prime minister of Slovenia, Robert Golob, the president of Cyprus, Nikos Christodoulides, King Abdullah II of Jordan, and the president of Mozambique, Filipe Nyusi |
| 11–12 June | Switzerland | Geneva | Attended the celebrations marking the 60th anniversary of UN Trade and Development |
| 12–15 June | Italy | Brindisi, Fasano | Attended the celebrations for the 30th anniversary of the United Nations Global Service Centre; Attended the 50th G7 summit at Borgo Egnazia |
| 30 June–1 July | Uzbekistan | Tashkent | Visited the Hazrati Imam Complex and laid a wreath at the Monument to the Independence of Uzbekistan; Met with President Shavkat Mirziyoyev, Foreign Minister Bakhtiyor Saidov, and the Chairwoman of the Senate, Tanzila Norbaeva |
| 1–3 July | Kyrgyzstan | Tamchy, Cholpon–Ata | Met with President Sadyr Japarov and Foreign Minister Jeenbek Kulubayev; Visited the cultural center Rukh Ordo |
| 3–4 July | Kazakhstan | Almaty, Astana | Visited an exhibition on the melting of glaciers in the region; Met with Kazakh president Kassym–Jomart Tokayev; Attended the Shanghai Cooperation Organisation Summit; Held bilateral meeting with the president of Mongolia, Ukhnaagiin Khürelsükh, the president of Belarus, Alexander Lukashenko, and the president of China & CCP General Secretary, Xi Jinping |
| 4–5 July | Tajikistan | Dushanbe | Met with President Emomali Rahmon; Visited the National Museum of Antiquities of Tajikistan |
| 5–7 July | Turkmenistan | Ashgabat | Met with President Serdar Berdimuhamedow; Met with Gurbanguly Berdimuhamedow, Chairman of the People's Council of Turkmenistan |
| 26–27 July | France | Paris | Attended the opening ceremony of the 2024 Summer Olympics; Met with the president of the International Olympic Committee, Thomas Bach; Held bilateral meetings with the foreign minister of France, Stéphane Séjourné, and the president of the European Council, Charles Michel |
| 21–23 August | Samoa | Apia | Met with Prime Minister Fiamē Naomi Mataʻafa; Visited the Aleipata Islands which are impacted by climate change |
| 23–24 August | New Zealand | Auckland | Met with Prime Minister Christopher Luxon |
| 24–27 August | Tonga | Nukuʻalofa, Kanokupolu | Met with Baron Waqa, Secretary General of the Pacific Islands Forum Secretariat, and attended the Pacific Islands Forum; Held bilateral meetings with the prime minister of Fiji, Sitiveni Rabuka, the president of the Federated States of Micronesia, Wesley Simina, the prime minister of the Cook Islands, Mark Brown, the prime minister of Tonga, Siaosi Sovaleni, the prime minister of Tuvalu, Feleti Teo, the president of the Marshall Islands, Hilda Heine, the prime minister of Vanuatu, Charlot Salwai, the prime minister Papua New Guinea, James Marape, and the prime minister of the Solomon Islands, Jeremiah Manele; Visited communities from Kanokupolu that were impacted by a tsunami |
| 28–31 August | Timor-Leste | Dili | Met with President José Ramos–Horta and Prime Minister Kay Rala Xanana Gusmão, reaffirming the UN’s commitment to Timor–Leste's development, democracy, and climate action.; Addressed the National Parliament, recognizing Timor–Leste's global influence and partnership with the UN, and was granted Timorese citizenship.; Held bilateral meetings with Sahrawi President Brahim Ghali and Fretilin party leader Mari Alkatiri.; Participated in the 25th–anniversary commemoration of the Popular Consultation, reaffirming UN support for Timor–Leste's independence and democracy.; Laid a wreath at the UN House in honor of fallen UN staff and met with the UN country team. |
| 31 August–2 September | Singapore | Singapore | Visited key sustainability sites, including Marina Barrage and the Sustainable Singapore Gallery, to learn about Singapore's water management, green transportation, and climate adaptation efforts.; Attended a lunch with the Minister of Sustainability and Environment, Grace Fu Hai Yien.; Toured the City Gallery at the Urban Redevelopment Authority and received a briefing on Singapore's land use planning.; Visited Punggol Library, Singapore's first library designed for persons with disabilities, and learned about digital inclusion programs.; Held bilateral meetings with President Tharman Shanmugaratnam, Prime Minister Lawrence Wong, and Senior Minister Lee Hsien Loong at the Istana Villa.; Visited the National Orchid Garden, where a hybrid orchid species was named after him |
| 2–5 September | China | Shanghai, Beijing | Spoke at the AI capacity–building workshop, emphasizing the need for international cooperation to bridge the AI gap and prevent worsening inequalities.; Met with Chen Jining, Secretary of the Shanghai Municipal Committee of the Chinese Communist Party and Ding Xuexiang the Vice Premier of the People's Republic of China, to discuss regional and global issues.; Attended the Forum on China–Africa Cooperation Summit, calling for financial system reforms, debt relief, and stronger China–Africa partnerships in renewable energy, food systems, and digital connectivity.; Met with President & CCP General Secretary Xi Jinping, recognizing China's contributions to the UN and discussing global cooperation, including the Summit of the Future. |
| 9–12 October | Laos | Vientiane | Met with Jin Liqun, President of the Asian Infrastructure Investment Bank. They discussed the reform of the international financial architecture.; Addressed the ASEAN–UN Summit in Vientiane.; Held bilateral meetings with the President & General Secretary of Laos, Thongloun Sisoulith, with the Prime Minister of Laos, Sonexay Siphandone, and with the Prime Minister of Vietnam, Phạm Minh Chính.; Visited an art exhibit made from unexploded ordnance, sponsored by the UN Development Programme (UNDP). |
| 20–22 October | Ethiopia | Addis Ababa | Took part in the eighth African Union–United Nations annual conference.; Went to the UN Economic Commission for Africa, where he took part in a ceremony for the inauguration of Africa Hall.; Held bilateral meetings with the Prime Minister of Ethiopia, Abiy Ahmed, and the President of Ethiopia, Taye Atske Selassie. |
| 22–26 October | Russia | Kazan | Addressed the sixteenth BRICS Summit.; Attended a welcome luncheon hosted by the Government of Tatarstan. Also visited the Kazan Kremlin, Annunciation Cathedral, Kul Sharif Mosque and the Kazan Federal University Museum.; Spoke briefly with Recep Tayyip Erdoğan, Abdel Fattah el-Sisi, Mahmoud Abbas, and Vikram Misri. Met with Serdar Berdimuhamedow and Alexander Lukashenko. |
| 28–30 October | Colombia | Cali | Attended the high-level segment of the sixteenth meeting of the Conference of Parties to the Convention on Biological Diversity (COP16); Met with President of Colombia Gustavo Petro Urrego. |
| 11–15 November | Azerbaijan | Baku | Attended the 2024 United Nations Climate Change Conference (COP29) |
| 16–19 November | Brazil | Rio de Janeiro | Attended the annual Group of 20 (G20) meeting |
| 21–23 November | Azerbaijan | Baku | Returned to the 2024 United Nations Climate Change Conference (COP29) |
| 23 November – 3 December | Portugal | Cascais, Lisbon | Attended the Global Forum of the UN Alliance of Civilizations; Met with the president of Portugal, Marcelo Rebelo de Sousa and with the prime minister of Portugal, Luís Montenegro |
| 11–12 December | South Africa | Johannesburg, Pretoria | Attended a meeting of the G20 sherpas and finance deputies; Met with South African president Cyril Ramaphosa |
| 12–14 December | Lesotho | Maseru | Met with King Letsie III and addressed a joint sitting of Parliament |

== 2025 ==
| Date | Countries | Places visited | Narrative |
|---|---|---|---|
| 8–9 January | United States | Washington DC | Attended the State Funeral for President Jimmy Carter. |
| 16–19 January | Lebanon | Beirut | Met with caretaker Prime Minister of Lebanon, Najib Mikati; Met with French president Emmanuel Macron. who was also on a visit.; Met with President Joseph Aoun, Prime Minister Designate Nawaf Salam |
| 20–24 January | Switzerland | Davos | Attended the annual World Economic Forum |
| 10–12 February | France | Paris | Attended the Artificial Intelligence Summit, co-hosted by French president Emmanuel Macron and Prime Minister Narendra Modi of India; Visited the headquarters of Reporters Sans Frontières (Reporters without Borders) |
| 13–17 February | Ethiopia | Addis Ababa | Attended the thirty-eighth African Union Summit |
| 19–20 February | Barbados | Bridgetown | Attended the forty-eighth Regular Meeting of the CARICOM |
| 23–24 February | Switzerland | Geneva | Attended the fifty-eighth session of the Human Rights Council |
| 2–5 March | Egypt | Cairo | Attended the Extraordinary Arab Summit on the situation in the Middle East/Gaza; Met with João Lourenço, President of Angola and Chair of the African Union, Joseph Aoun, President of Lebanon, Ahmed al-Sharaa, President of Syria, António Costa, President of the European Council |
| 13–16 March | Bangladesh | Dhaka; Cox's Bazar | Met with the Chief Adviser, Muhammad Yunus; Met refugees from Myanmar |
| 16-18 March | Switzerland | Geneva | Held bilateral meetings with the two Cypriot leaders |
| 18-21 March | Belgium | Brussels | Met with European Union leaders and the prime minister of Belgium, Bart De Wever |
| 25 April | Vatican City | Vatican City | Attended the funeral of Pope Francis |
| 25 April | Italy | Rome | |
| 6–9 May | Denmark | Copenhagen | Chaired the biannual meeting of the Chief Executives Board of the United Nations; Met with Mette Frederiksen, Prime Minister of Denmark. |
| 13–15 May | Germany | Berlin | Attended the UN Peacekeeping Ministerial Meeting on the Future of Peacekeeping; Met with President of Germany Frank-Walter Steinmeier and Chancellor of Germany Friedrich Merz |
| 15–18 May | Iraq | Baghdad | Attended the League of Arab States Summit. |
| 8-10 June | France | Nice | Attended the 2025 United Nations Ocean Conference. |
| 11 June | Vatican City | Vatican City | Met with Pope Leo XIV. |
| 16-18 June | Canada | Kananaskis | Met with G7 leaders. |
| 29 June-1 July | Spain | Sevilla | Attended the Fourth International Conference on Financing for Development. |
| 05-09 July | Brazil | Rio de Janeiro | Attended the Seventeenth Summit of the BRICS . |
| 03 August | Kazakhstan | Almaty | Met with President Kassym-Jomart Tokayev. |
| 03-06 August | Turkmenistan | Awaza | Attended the Third UN Conference on Landlocked Developing Countries. |
| 19-23 August | Japan | Yokohama, Tokyo | Attended the International Conference on African Development and met with Prime minister Shigeru Ishiba. |
| 30 August-1 September | China | Tianjin | Attended the Shanghai Cooperation Organization Summit 2025. |
| 2-5 September | Papua New Guinea | Port Moresby | Met with Prime minister James Marape and took part in events to mark the fiftieth anniversary of Papua New Guinea's independence. |
| 13-14 October | Egypt | Sharm El-Sheikh | Attended the Gaza peace summit co-hosted by Abdel Fattah Al Sisi and Donald Trump. |
| 22-23 October | Switzerland | Geneva | Participated in a special session of the World Meteorological Congress. |
| 24-25 October | Vietnam | Hanoi | Attended an event marking the signature of the UN Convention against Cybercrime. |
| 26-28 October | Malaysia | Kuala Lumpur | Attended the 2025 ASEAN Summits. |
| 3-5 November | Qatar | Doha | Attended the Second World Summit for Social Development. |
| 5-8 November | Brazil | Belém | Attended the 2025 United Nations Climate Change Conference. |
| 17-20 November | Brazil | Belém | Attended the 2025 United Nations Climate Change Conference. |
| 21-23 November | South Africa | Johannesburg | Attended the 2025 G20 Johannesburg summit. |
| 23-25 November | Angola | Luanda | Addressed the Seventh African Union-European Union Summit. |
| 10-13 December | Saudi Arabia | Riyadh | Met with Crown Prince Mohammed bin Salman. |
| 13 December | Iraq | Baghdad | Met with president Abdul Latif Rashid. |
| 13-14 December | Saudi Arabia | Riyadh | Attended the Global Forum of the UN Alliance of Civilizations. |
| 14-15 December | Oman | Muscat | Met with Sultan Haitham bin Tariq. |

== 2026 ==
| Date | Countries | Places visited | Narrative |
|---|---|---|---|
| 16-18 January | United Kingdom | London | Met with Prime minister Keir Starmer. |
| 18-20 January | Switzerland | Geneva | Met with his Special Representatives and Envoys. |
| 5-7 February | Italy | Milan | Attended the 2026 Winter Olympics opening ceremony. |
| 12-15 February | Ethiopia | Addis Ababa | Attended the 39th Ordinary Session of the Assembly of the African Union. |
| 18-22 February | India | New Delhi | Attended the AI Impact Summit and met with Prime minister Narendra Modi. |
| 23 February | Switzerland | Geneva | Attended the 61st session of the UN Human Rights Council |
| 11-13 March | Turkey | Ankara | Met with Turkish President Recep Tayyip Erdoğan and received the Atatürk International Peace Prize. |
| 13-16 March | Lebanon | Beirut | Met with Lebanese President Joseph Aoun |
| 18-19 March | Belgium | Brussels | Attended informal discussions with members of the European Council and representatives of the European Union |
| 15 April | United States | Washington D.C. | Participated in the Spring Meetings of the World Bank and the International Monetary Fund. |
| 16-17 April | Netherlands | The Hague | Participated in the commemoration of the International Court of Justice's eightieth anniversary and met with Prime minister of the Netherlands Rob Jetten. |
| 10-12 May | Kenya | Nairobi | Attended the Africa Forward summit. |
| 13 May | Ethiopia | Addis Ababa | Attended the 10th African Union-United Nations Conference and met with President of France Emmanuel Macron. |
| 17-20 May | Japan | Tokyo | Attended the event "Celebrating 70: Japan-UN Cooperation, Expo 2025 & the Future of Multilateralism". |
| 15-17 June | Dominican Republic | Santo Domingo | Travelled to Haiti via the Dominican Republic. |
| 16 June | Haiti | Port-au-Prince | Met with Prime minister Alix Didier Fils-Aimé. |
| 16-17 July | China | Shanghai | Attended the World AI Conference. |
| 25-27 July | Syria | Damascus | Working visit. |
| 28-29 July | Cyprus | Nicosia | Working visit. |
| 31 August - 2 September | Kyrgyzstan | Bishkek | Attended the Shanghai Cooperation Organization meeting. |
| 11-13 September | India | New Delhi | Attended the 18th BRICS summit. |
| 15-16 October | Armenia | Yerevan | Attended the 17th meeting of the COP 17 for Biodiversity (CBD). |
| 16-18 November | Philippines | Manila | Attended the 49th ASEAN Summit and related meetings. |
