= United Nations Department of Field Support =

- Abbreviation: DFS
- Formation: 2007
- Dissolved: December 31, 2018; 6 years ago
- Headquarters: United Nations Headquarters
- Head: Under-Secretary-General for Field Support; Atul Khare
- Parent organization: United Nations Secretariat
- Subsidiaries: United Nations Global Service Centre; Regional Service Centre in Entebbe
- Website: https://peacekeeping.un.org/en/department-of-field-support

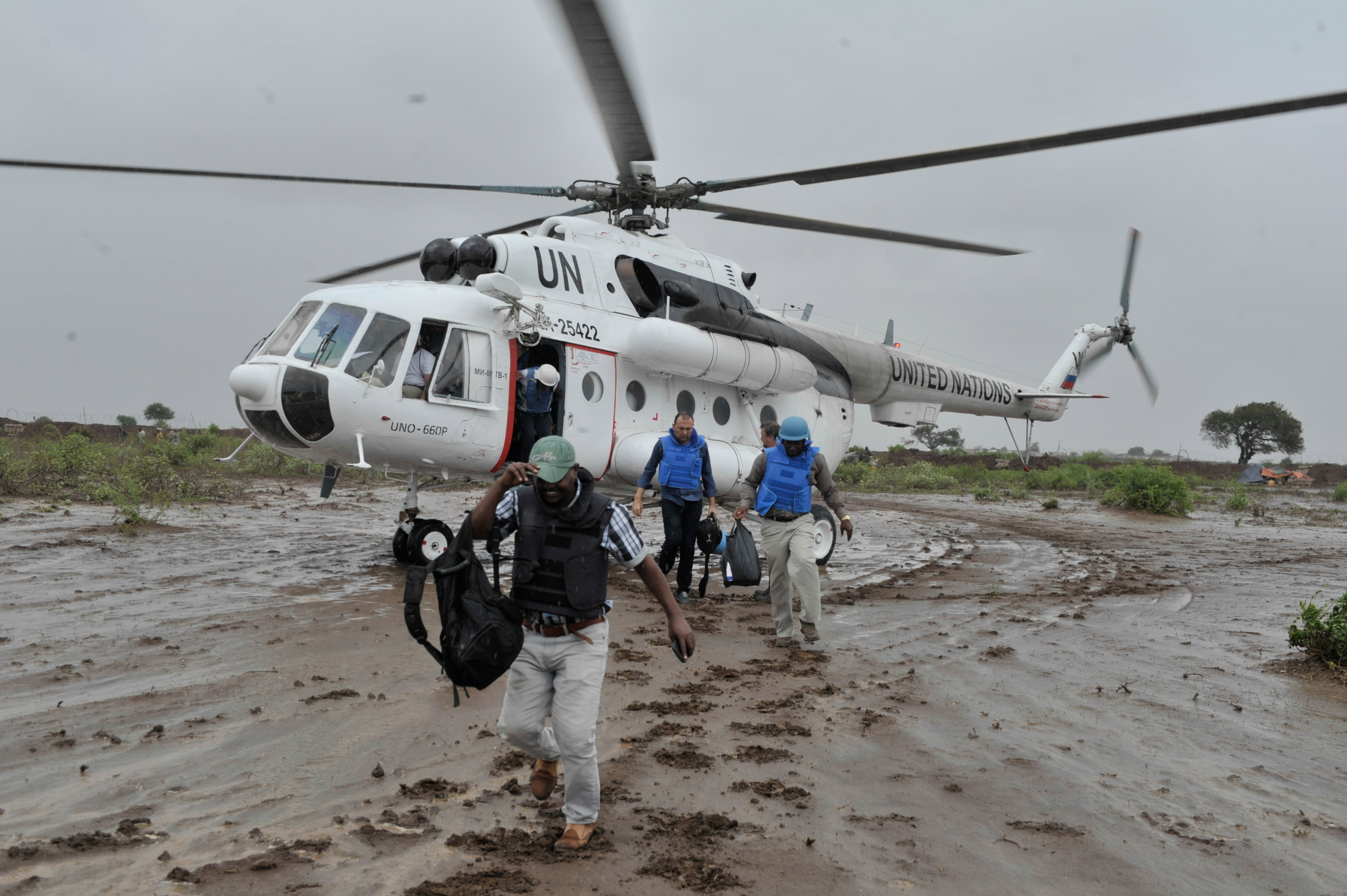
DFS officials in Somalia in November 2014.

The Department of Field Support (DFS) was a department of the United Nations dedicated to the support of peacekeeping field missions and political field missions. Following the UN Secretary-general's management reform, it ceased to exist on 31 December 2018. In January 2019, the new Department of Operational Support was created.

== Area of responsibility ==
United Nations General Assembly report A/64/633 (26 January 2010) states the following about the DFS' role:

"Protecting and nurturing a fragile peace is a critical role of the United Nations. This endeavour depends upon a coalition of will and action on the part of multiple actors: the Security Council, in terms of setting mandates; the Member States, in their commitment of personnel and financial and material resources; the host countries, and their consent and cooperation; and the Secretariat and its own ability to stand up, support and sustain operations. Within this framework, the Department of Field Support was created to be primarily responsible for the mobilization all human, material and support services necessary to ensure that United Nations field missions are largely self-sufficient and can succeed under a wide range of post-conflict conditions."

— UNGA Report 64/633

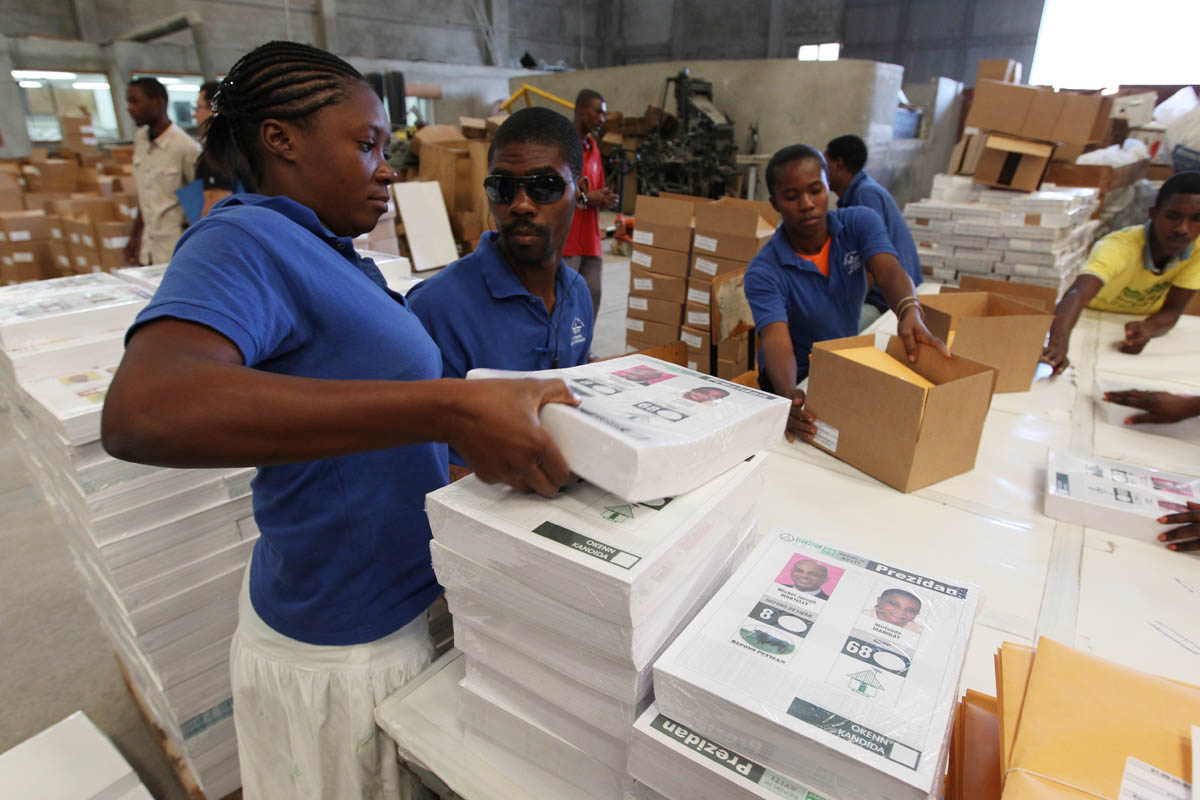
DFS workers packing Haiti election ballots in 2011.

== Organization ==
The Department of Field Support was headed by Mr. Atul Khare from 2 March 2015 to 31 December 2018, following the departure of Under-Secretary-General Ms. Ameerah Haq. The department has four main divisions:

- Field Personnel Division
- Field Budget and Finance Division
- Logistics Support Division
- Information & Communications Technology Division

It also runs bases in UN Global Service Center (UNGSC) in Brindisi (UNLB) and Valencia (UNSBV), as well as Regional Service Center in Entebbe (RSCE).

Founded in 2010, the UN Global Service Center's mandate is to "ensure efficient and effective peace operations through the core logistics, geospatial, information and telecommunications technology services it provides."

Founded in 2010 as part of the Global Field Support Strategy (GFSS) in UNGA Resolution 64/269, the Regional Service Center in Entebbe's mandate is to "transform service delivery to field missions through a fundamental shift in the existing division of labor and a relocation of functions to improve responsiveness and address the needs of the field missions."

== Personnel ==
Field Service Officers are civilians assigned to support UN peacekeeping and political missions in the field. DFS provides support in the areas of security, finance, administration, human resources, logistics and technology.

== History of the DFS ==
The origins of the Field Service go back to the beginning of the history of the UN's peacekeeping operations in 1948 when the Security Council authorized the deployment of UN military observers to the Middle East. The mission's role was to monitor the Armistice Agreement between Israel and its Arab neighbours – an operation which became known as the United Nations Truce Supervision Organization (UNTSO). The office was created in 2007 to provide dedicated support to peacekeeping field missions and political field missions.

== See also ==
- United Nations Peacekeeping
- United Nations Department of Peacekeeping Operations
- List of United Nations Peacekeeping Missions
