= Rukh Ordo =

- Культурный Центр «Рух Ордо» им. Ч. Айтматова
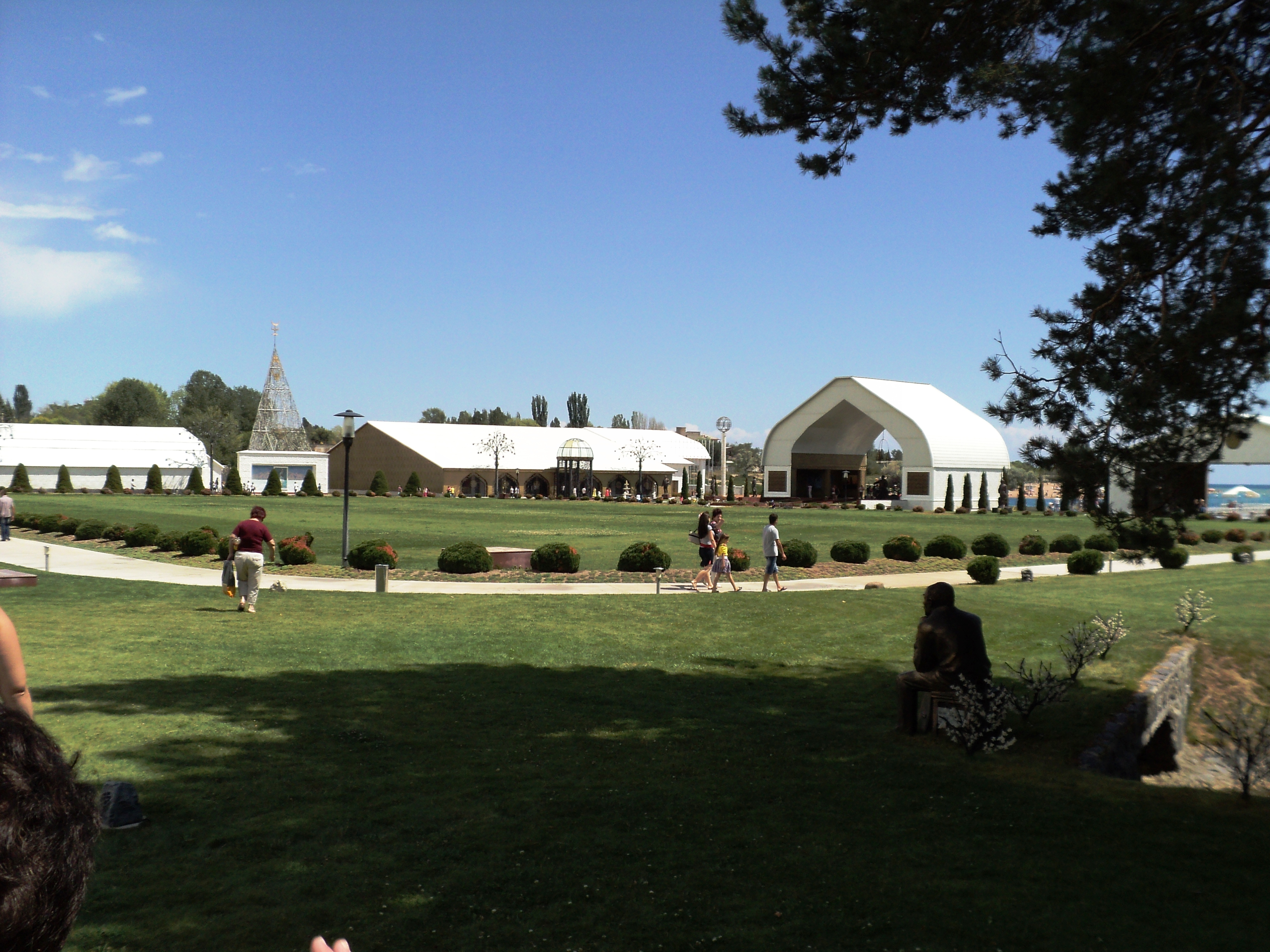
- Established: 2002
- Location: Cholpon-Ata, Kyrgyzstan
- Coordinates: 42.648085°N 77.095029°E
- Type: Cultural museum
- Website: rukhordo.kg/en

The Rukh Ordo (Kyrgyz and Russian: Рух Ордо) is a cultural complex and open-air museum in Cholpon-Ata, Kyrgyzstan. The name of the complex means in Kyrgyz, "The Spirits' Center". The cultural complex is located near the shore of Issyk-Kul Lake and occupies 4.5 hectares.

== History ==
The founder of the cultural complex was Tashkul Kereksizov, who founded this cultural complex as well as the Aalam Ordo cultural center in the Issyk-kul region. The cultural complex was established in 2002 and opened for the first time in 2007. In 2018, the 12th President of Turkey, Recep Tayyip Erdoğan, visited the cultural complex during a visit to Kyrgyzstan. In 2021, the complex was visited by Fuat Oktay, the first vice president of Turkey. In May 2021, the annual Kyrgyz tourism exhibition was presented at the cultural complex, this exhibition included classes by artisan masters for the creation of handicrafts and souvenirs, in addition to a theatrical show and demonstration of hunting games, the exhibition was funded by the Ministry of Economy and Finance of Kyrgyzstan, Kyrgyz Community Based Tourism Association, Kyrgyz Association of Tour Operators and Kyrgyz Resorts Association. In July 2021, a world nomadic fashion festival was organized in the cultural complex, where public figures and designers from Uzbekistan, Turkey, Russia, Iran, China, France, Korea and Italy were present. In August 2021, the cultural complex organized the debut concert of the singer Fatima Serazieva and the musical ensemble "Melodia". In October 2021, the creation of a monument to Tashkul Kereksizov was initiated by the secretary general of Chingiz Aitmatov Issyk-Kul Forum, Assol Moldokmatova.

== Collections ==
The cultural complex contains statues of Kyrgyz khans, also the cultural complex contains information about the family tree of Turkic tribes. The exhibits of the cultural complex are about the traditions of the Kyrgyz people. The museum contains Sayakbai Karalaev, Manaschi, Chinghiz Aitmatov and Mustafa Kemal Atatürk monuments. The cultural complex consists of 10 mini-museums, including House-Museum of Chinghiz Aitmatov, Photo Gallery, Hall of Kyrgyz Art and Culture, Sayakbay Karalaev's Gazebo, Treasury of Knowledge, and five chapels representing different religions, namely Islam, Judaism, Catholicism, Orthodoxy and Buddhism.

== Gallery ==
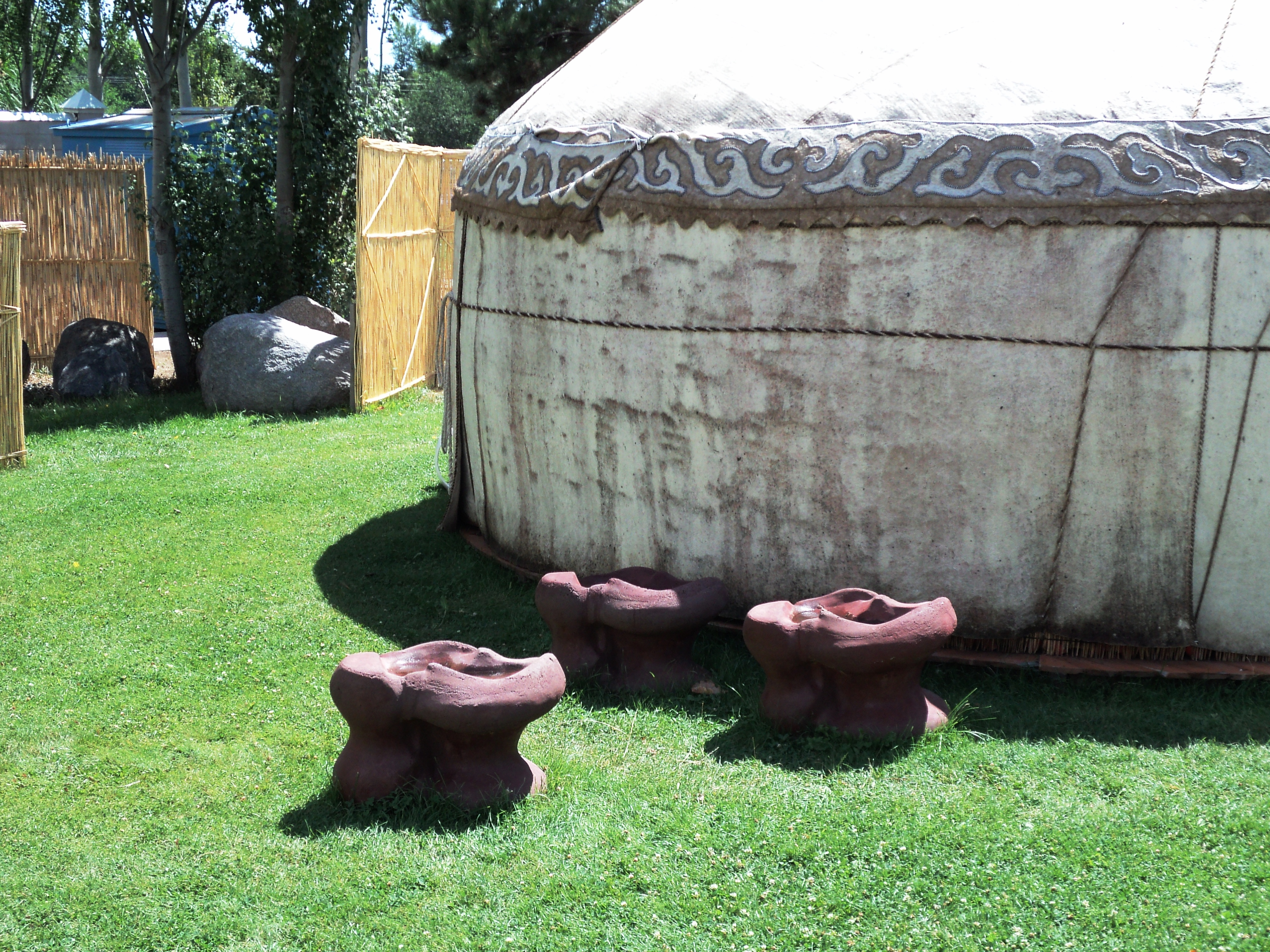

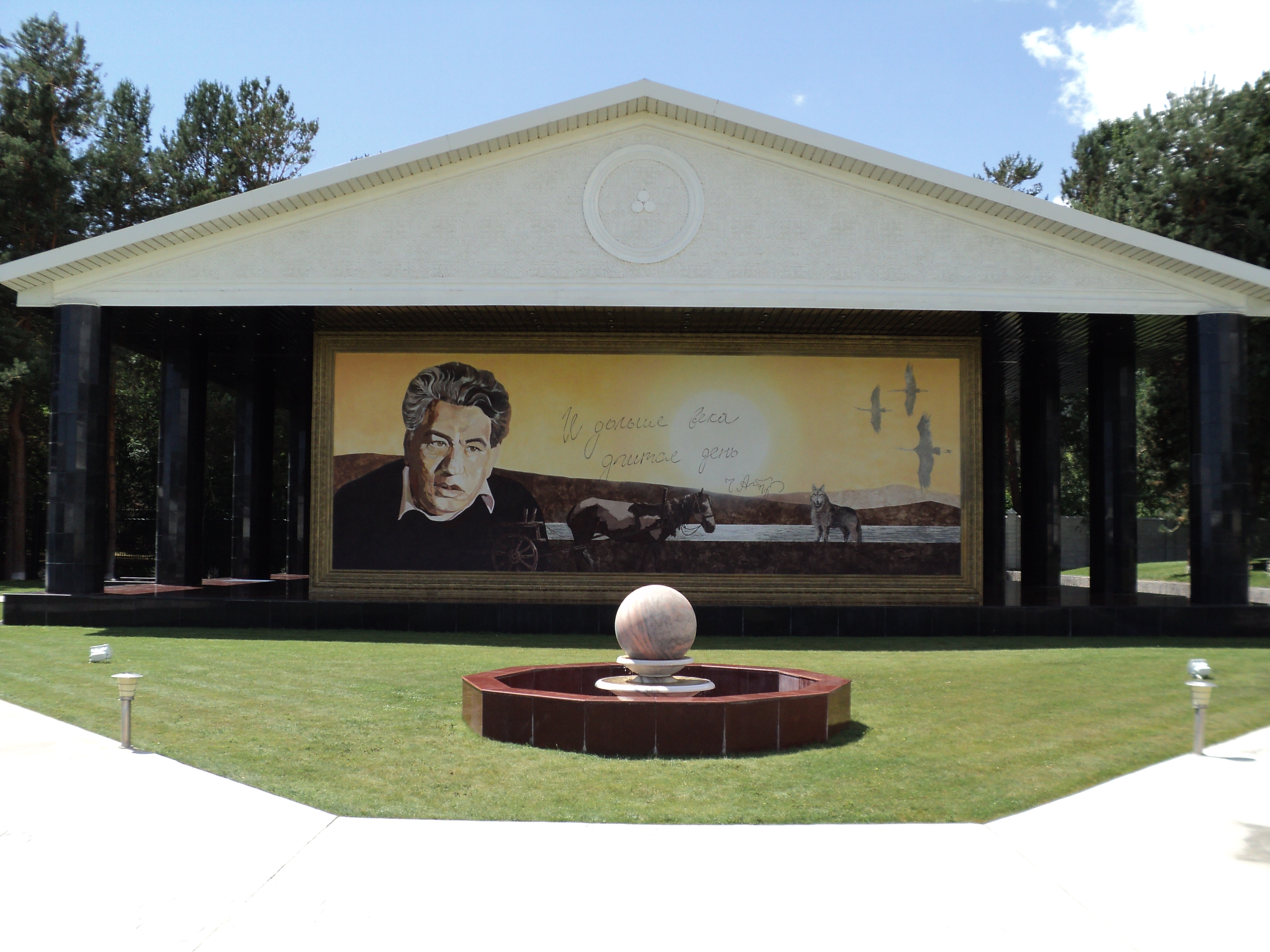

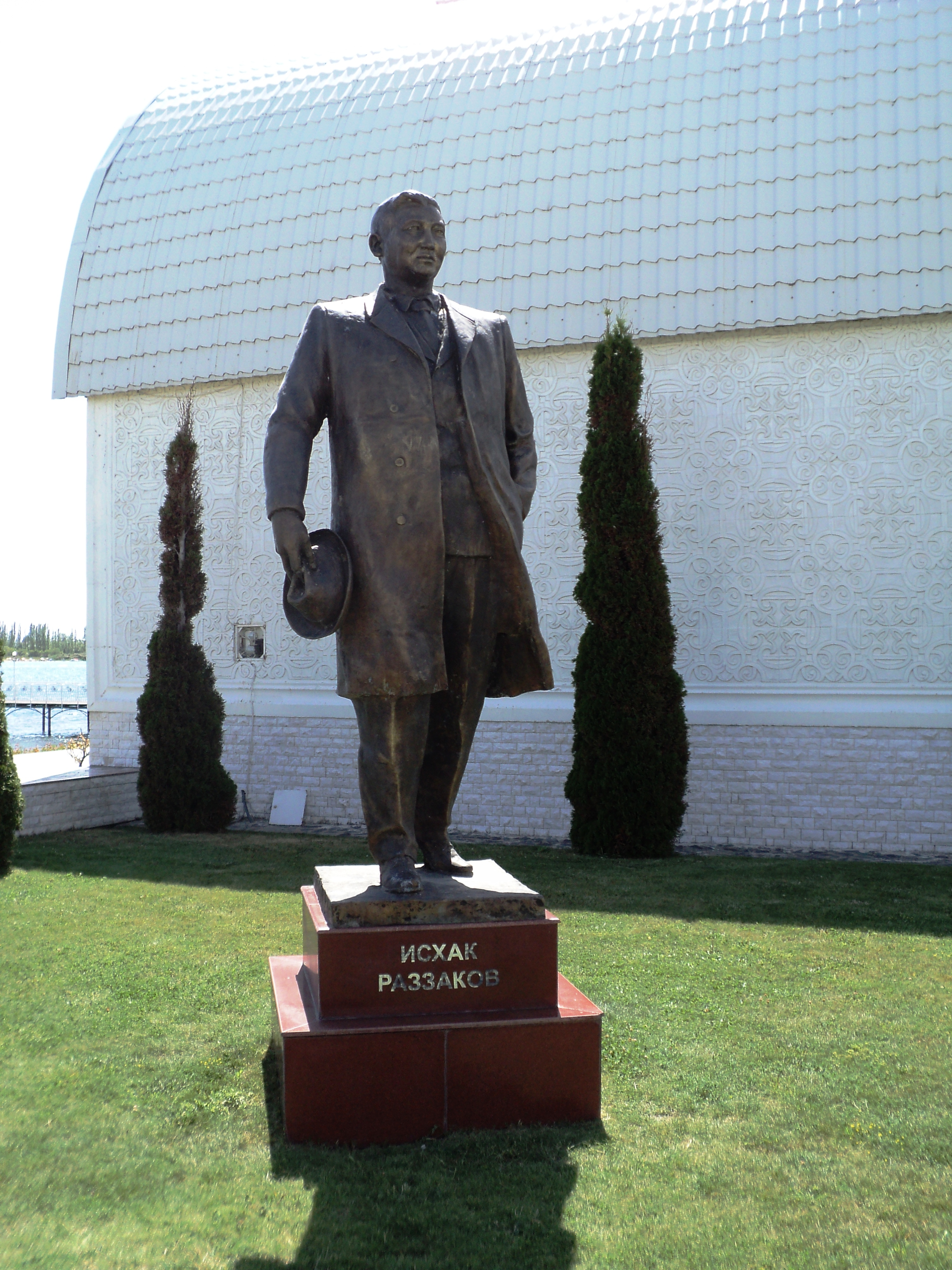

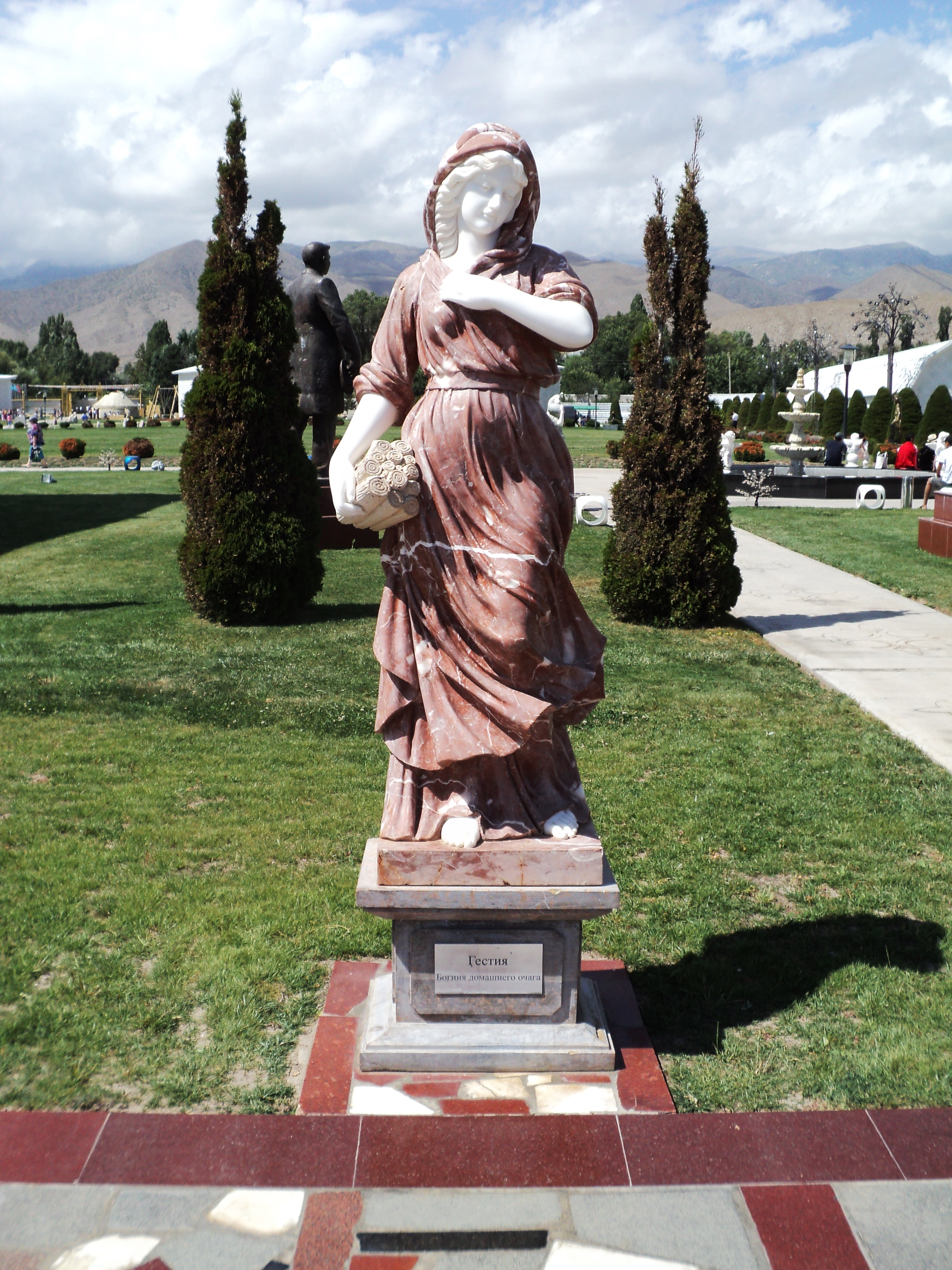
