= United Nations Global Service Centre =

United Nations Peacekeeping office based in Brindisi, Italy, and Valencia, Spain

- Abbreviation: UNGSC
- Formation: 1994; 31 years ago
- Legal status: Active
- Headquarters: Brindisi, Italy; Valencia, Spain
- Parent organization: United Nations Department of Field Support
- Website: ungsc.org

The United Nations Global Service Centre (UNGSC) is United Nations Peacekeeping office based in Brindisi, Italy, as well as Valencia, Spain that provides logistics, geospatial intelligence, IT services and training to peacekeeping and special political missions around the world.

== History and mandate ==
THE UNGSC traces its roots back to the United Nations Logistics Base (UNLB), which was formed in 1994, and is currently based in Brindisi, Italy. The UNLB was formed due to the fact that the previous storage depot for United Nations Department of Peacekeeping Operations (DPKO), the United Nations Supply Depot (UNSD), had become too small to handle the DPKO's surplus equipment. The UNLB's primary functions were to provide: logistic support, strategic and global information and communications technology support services and training.

In 2009, the UN Support Base in Valencia (UNSBV) was formed in Valencia, Spain to assist with information and telecommunications of UN missions around the world. The base works in conjunction with UNLB to enhance the UN's capacity to respond efficiently to crises around the world.

On 24 June 2010 the General Assembly passed Resolution 64/269, which created the Global Field Support Strategy (GFSS) which merged the UNLB and UNSBV into one organization called the "Global Service Centre." The mandate of the UNGSC is "to ensure efficient and effective peace operations through the core logistics, geospatial, information and telecommunications technology services it provides."

== Services provided ==
The UNGSC consists of three main core service areas. Some of their duties include:

Supply Chain Service

- Act as focal point for Missions and HQ,
- Asset and Resource Management,
- Developing designs, statement of requirements and technical specifications for field missions.

Field Technology Service

- Provide various global and centralized geospatial services for field operations, the secretariat and agencies,
- Provide highly available wide area satellite service connectivity for all its internal and external clients,
- Provide hosting of centralized applications, messaging and collaborative applications, backup and archiving, cloud and mobile computing and disaster recovery infrastructure.

Central Service

- Administrative support, including: administering finances and budgets, proving human resources and procurement of goods and services for the UNGSC,
- Occupational health and safety for all UN Field Mission, other UN Agencies and International Organizations,
- Management of training and other learning activities hosted at the GSC.
