= United Nations Regional Service Centre in Entebbe =

Creating Regional Service Centre in Entebbe

- Abbreviation: RSCE
- Formation: 2010; 16 years ago
- Legal status: Active
- Headquarters: Entebbe, Uganda
- Head: Director Regional Service Centre Entebbe; Paulin Djomo
- Parent organization: United Nations Department of Operational Support
- Website: rsce.unmissions.org

The United Nations Regional Service Centre in Entebbe (RCSE) is a shared service centre based in Entebbe, Uganda that provides services, such as administrative, logistics and information and communications technology to various United Nations missions in Africa.

== History and mandate ==
The RSCE was created on 24 June 2010 as part of General Assembly Resolution 64/269, which created the Global Field Support Strategy (GFSS). The mission of the GFSS was to "transform service delivery to field missions through a fundamental shift in the existing division of labor and a relocation of functions to improve responsiveness and address the needs of the field missions."

The RSCE currently provides a full range of administrative, logistics and information and communications technology services to seventeen Client Missions in Africa, representing over 62% of all United Nations peacekeeping and special political missions worldwide.

The General Assembly, through its resolution 69/307 decided to give the RSCE operational and managerial independence as of 1 July 2017. The refreshed governance structure of the Centre is in the form of a shared Steering Committee headed by the Assistant Secretary-General for Support Operations, the Director of the Human Resources Services Division in Department of Operational Support, a representative from the Department of Management Strategy, Policy and Compliance, the Director of the Centre, the Chief of the Kuwait Joint Support Office, the Chairperson of the Centre Client Board and the Chairperson of the Kuwait Joint Support Office Client Board.

In May 2018 a U.N. Advisory Committee recommended closing the Centre and relocating it to Nairobi, Kenya, a proposal which faced opposition in the Parliament of Uganda.

== Services provided ==
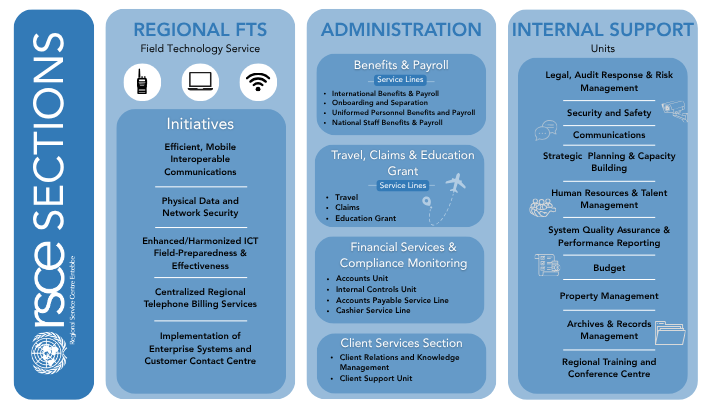

The RSCE provides a wide range of services to UN Missions, primarily those located in East and Central Africa. Including, but not limited to the following:

Administrative Services:

- Performs the Treasury/Cashier role for all RSCE client missions.
- Processes of entitlements and benefits for international civilian staff of RSCE mission clients.
- Processes all education grant requests for civilian staff members serving RSCE and field missions in Africa.
- Processes travel requests (family visits, education, R&R, etc.) of RSCE mission client's staff members.
- Provides human resources and finance services to national staff of 17 client missions/offices in Africa.
- Processes travel requests from RSCE client missions for official travel.
- Handles all of the logistics for International Uniformed Personnel (IUPs) in RSCE Client Missions.
- Deals in with external vendors, who provide the United Nations with services and supplies.

Regional Field Technology Services (RFTS):

- Provide efficient, mobile and interoperable communications.
- Improve safety and standardized physical, data and network ICT security.
- Enhance and harmonize regional civilian and signals ICT field-preparedness and effectiveness.
- Provide efficient, centralized regional telephone billing services.
- Implement standard enterprise systems for missions in the region.

Regional Training and Conference Centre

- Training hub for Department of Operational Support (DOS) and UN field missions.

== Missions served ==
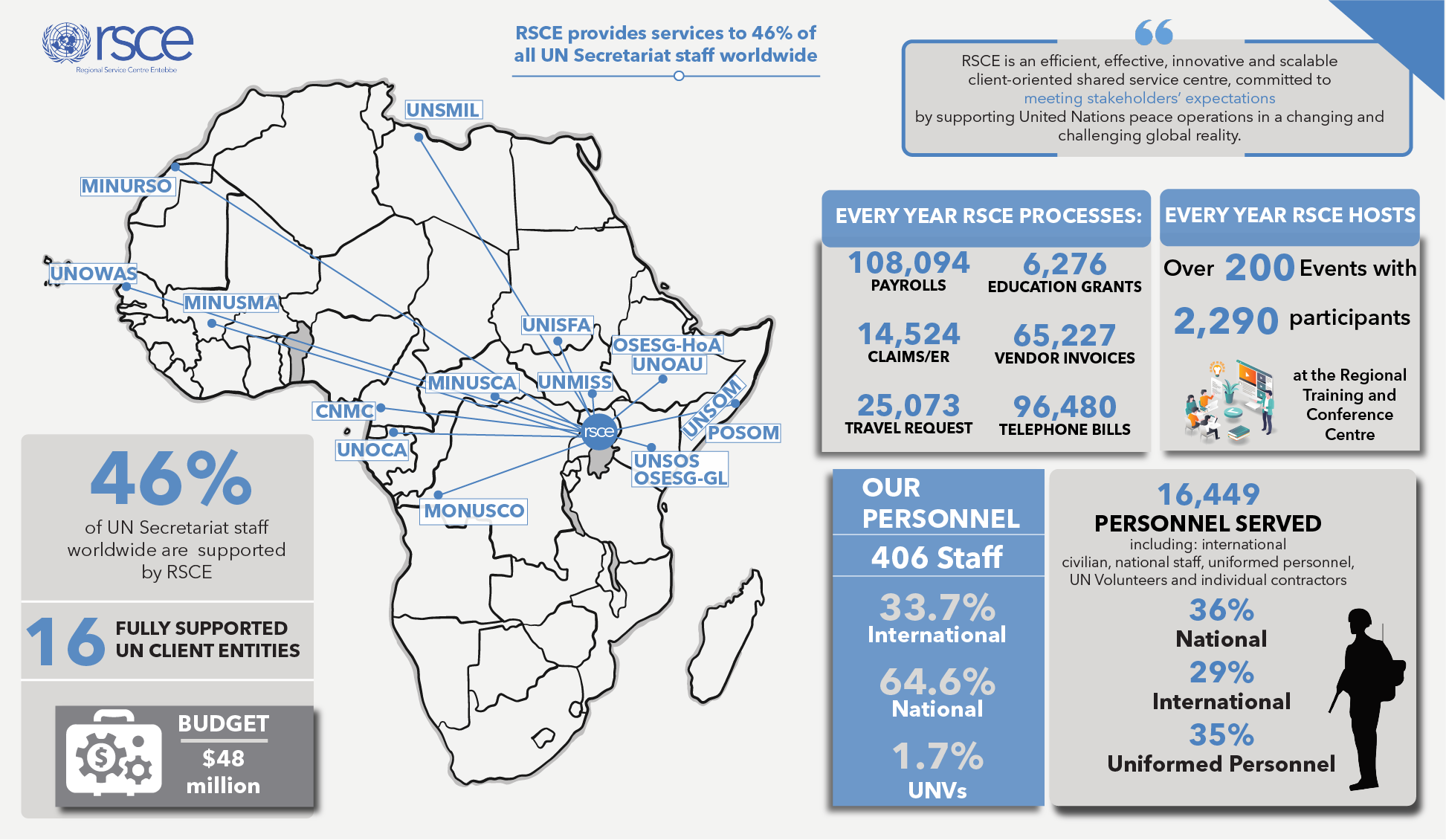

THE RSCE Provides services to the following missions:

- United Nations Multidimensional Integrated Stabilization Mission in the Central African Republic (MINUSCA)
- United Nations Organization Stabilization Mission in the Democratic Republic of Congo (MONUSCO)
- United Nations Interim Security Force for Abyei (UNISFA)
- United Nations Mission in South Sudan (UNMISS)
- United Nations Support Office in Somalia (UNSOS)
- United Nations Regional Office for Central Africa (UNOCA)
- United Nations Assistance Mission in Somalia (UNSOM)
- United Nations Mission for the Referendum in Western Sahara (MINURSO)
- Office of the Special Envoy of the Secretary-General for the Great Lakes (OSESG - GL)
- United Nations Office to the African Union (UNOAU)
- Office of the Special Envoy of the Secretary-General for Horn of Africa (OSESG-HoA)
- United Nations Support Office in Libya (UNSMIL)
- United Nations Office for West Africa and Sahel (UNOWAS)
- Cameroon-Nigeria Mixed Commission (CNMC)
- Panel of Experts Somalia (POSOM)
- Personal Envoy of the Secretary-General for Sudan (PESGS)
- Regional Service Centre Entebbe (RSCE)
