= Chen Ter-shing =

Taiwanese politician

- 陳德新

Chairman of Straits Exchange Foundation (acting)
- In office 20 May 2016 – 12 September 2016
- Preceded by: Lin Join-sane
- Succeeded by: Tien Hung-mao

Vice Minister of Science and Technology
- In office 3 March 2014 – September 2017
- Minister: Chang San-cheng; Lin Yi-bing (acting); Shyu Jyuo-min; Yang Hung-duen; Chen Liang-gee
- Deputy: Chiu Jeng-jiann, Tsai Mi-ching
- Succeeded by: Tsou Yu-han

Personal details
- Education: National Chung Hsing University (LLB); Chinese Culture University (LLM, PhD)

Chen Ter-shing (Chinese: 陳德新; pinyin: Chén Déxīn) is a Taiwanese lawyer. He was the Vice Minister of Science and Technology in 2014–2017.

== Education ==
Chen graduated from National Chung Hsing University with a Bachelor of Laws (LL.B.) in 1974. He then earned a Master of Laws (LL.M.) in 1976 and a Ph.D. in law in 1994, both from Chinese Culture University.

== Early career ==
Chen passed the civil service senior examination for legal affairs in 1975 and special civil service level A examination for legal affairs in 1988.

== See also ==
- Ministry of Science and Technology (Taiwan)
