= Michael Honig =

American electrical engineer (born 1955)

Michael L. Honig (born 1955) is a professor of electrical engineering and computer science at Northwestern University. He is the recipient of a Humboldt Research Award for Senior U.S. Scientists, and the co-recipient of the 2002 IEEE Communications Society and Information Theory Society Joint Paper Award and the 2010 IEEE Marconi Prize Paper Award. He is an Institute of Electrical and Electronics Engineers (IEEE) Fellow. He is an Editor for the IEEE Transactions on Information Theory (1998-2000) and the IEEE Transactions on Communications (1990-1995), and as a guest editor for the Journal on Selected Topics in Signal Processing, European Transactions on Telecommunications, and Wireless Personal Communications. He also served as a member of the Digital Signal Processing Technical Committee for the IEEE Signal Processing Society and as a member of the Board of Governors for the Information Theory Society (1997-2002). He holds 11 patents and has given over 14 invited distinguished lectures. His research interests include wireless channels with feedback, resource allocation, and spectrum markets.

He holds a bachelor of science in electrical engineering from Stanford University and a master of science and PhD in electrical engineering from the University of California, Berkeley.
