= Tsai Mi-ching =

Taiwanese physicist and engineer

- 蔡明祺

Deputy Minister of Science and Technology
- In office 20 May 2016 – February 10, 2017
- Minister: Yang Hung-duen
- Vice: Chen Ter-shing

Personal details
- Born: 1955 (age 70–71) Taiwan
- Education: National Taiwan University of Science and Technology (BS, MS); University of Oxford (DPhil)
- Scientific career
- Fields: Engineering science
- Thesis: Super-optimal control system design for multivariable plants (1989)

Tsai Mi-ching (Chinese: 蔡明祺; pinyin: Cài Míngqí; born 1955) is a Taiwanese physicist and engineering scientist. He was the Deputy Minister of Science and Technology from 20 May 2016 to 10 February 2017.

== Education ==
Tsai graduated from the National Taiwan University of Science and Technology with a bachelor's degree and a master's degree in electrical engineering in 1981 and 1983, respectively. He then completed doctoral studies in England, where he earned his Doctor of Philosophy (D.Phil.) in engineering science from the University of Oxford in 1989. His doctoral dissertation, completed under professor Ian Postlethwaite, was titled, "Super-optimal control system design for multivariable plants".

== Career ==
In August 1990, Tsai was appointed Associate Professor in the Department of Mechanical Engineering at National Cheng Kung University (NCKU), and was promoted to full Professor in August 1995. From November 1998 to July 2003, he served as Head of the Research and Development Department at NCKU. Concurrently, he was Director of the Motor Technology Research Center at the NCKU Research Center from April 1999 to July 2007. Between January 2001 and December 2003, he also served as Director of Control Science in the Engineering Technology Development Division of the National Science Council, Executive Yuan. In August 2002, he was named Distinguished Professor of Mechanical Engineering at NCKU. From August 2003 to August 2004, he was a Visiting Professor in the Department of Engineering at the University of Cambridge in the UK. He later directed the Metal Processing Technology Center at the NCKU Research Center from August 2005 to July 2007. From September 2007 to July 2010, he was Director of the Engineering Department of the National Science Council, Executive Yuan.

In August 2008, he became Chair Professor of Mechanical Engineering at NCKU, a position he continues to hold. He returned as Director of the Motor Technology Research Center from August 2010 to June 2011 and again from February 2015 to the present. From February 2011 to January 2015, he served as Director of the National Cheng Kung University Research Center. Additionally, he directed the Technology Transfer and Incubation Center of NCKU from August 2012 to March 2013. From January 2014 to December 2015, he was President of the IEEE Tainan Chapter. Between July 2015 and June 2016, he served as Chairman of the Metal Industry Research and Development Center. From May 2016 to February 2017, he held the position of Deputy Minister of Science and Technology for the Republic of China.

== See also ==
- Ministry of Science and Technology (Taiwan)
