= TMCM =

TMCM may refer to:

- Taiwan Metal Creation Museum, a museum in Tainan, Taiwan
- Too Much Coffee Man, an American satirical superhero
