= Lin Minn-tsong =

Taiwanese physicist

Lin Minn-tsong (Chinese: 林敏聰) is a Taiwanese physicist.

== Education and academic career ==
Lin graduated from National Taiwan University with a Bachelor of Science in physics in 1985. He moved to Germany for advanced study in the subject, completing a Master's of Science at Heidelberg University in 1993, followed by a Dr. rer. nat. at the University of Halle in 1996. In August 1997, he returned to Taiwan to establish the Nano–Magnetism Laboratory at NTU and eventually became a distinguished professor. Lin was jointly appointed to an associate research fellowship at the Institute of Atomic and Molecular Sciences of Academia Sinica in 2004 and became a full research fellow in 2008.

== Political career ==
Lin is a past president of the Taiwan Democracy Watch. Prior to succeeding Hsu Yu-chin as deputy minister of science and technology in May 2020, Lin had been director-general of its Natural Sciences and Sustainable Development Department. Throughout his tenure as deputy minister, Lin was sought for comments on maritime research, space research, and disaster response. Lin also led a number of scientific exchanges between Taiwan and European nations. Concurrent with his deputy ministerial position between 2020 and 2024, Lin chaired the National Synchrotron Radiation Research Center.

== Honors and awards ==
In 2025, National Taiwan University had three of its academic staff elected to fellowship of the American Physical Society within the same class: Lin, Kao Ying-jer, and Chiang Cheng-wei. Lin's citation acknowledged him, "[f]or leadership in the advancement of physical sciences in Taiwan, global partnerships, and science advocacy while performing exceptional foundational research into the interaction in low-dimensional or nano-scaled magnetic systems."
