= Lin Yi-bing =

Taiwanese computer scientist (born 1961)

- 林一平

Minister of Science and Technology (acting)
- In office 8 December 2014 – 23 February 2015
- Preceded by: Chang San-cheng
- Succeeded by: Shyu Jyuo-min

Deputy Minister of Science and Technology
- In office 3 March 2014 – 7 December 2014
- Minister: Chang San-cheng
- Preceded by: Position established

Deputy Minister of the National Science Council of the Executive Yuan
- In office January 2014 – 2 March 2014
- Minister: Cyrus Chu
- Preceded by: Hocheng Hong
- Succeeded by: Position abolished

Personal details
- Born: October 26, 1961 (age 65)
- Education: National Cheng Kung University (BS); University of Washington (PhD)
- Scientific career
- Fields: Computer science
- Thesis: Understanding the limits of optimistic and conservative parallel simulation (1990)

Lin Yi-bing (Chinese: 林一平; pinyin: Lín Yīpíng; born October 26, 1961), also known by his English name Jason Lin, is a Taiwanese computer scientist who was a minister at the National Science and Technology Council from 2014 to 2015. He has been the Winbond Chair Professor of Computer Science and Information Engineering at National Yang Ming Chiao Tung University since 1995 and a chair professor of computer science at Providence University since 2002.

== Education ==
Lin graduated from National Cheng Kung University with a Bachelor of Science (B.S.) in electrical engineering in 1983. He then completed doctoral studies in the United States, where he earned his Ph.D. from the University of Washington in 1990 under computer scientist Ed Lazowska. His doctoral dissertation was titled, "Understanding the limits of optimistic and conservative parallel simulation".

== Career ==
His research interests include personal communications, mobile computing, intelligent network signaling, computer telephony integration, and parallel simulation. He has developed an Internet of Things (IoT) platform called IoTtalk. This platform has been used for sustainable applications including AgriTalk for intelligent agriculture, EduTalk for intelligent education, CampusTalk for intelligent university campus, and so on.

From 1983 to 1985, he served as a second lieutenant instructor at the Communication and Electronics School of the ROC Army in Taiwan. From 1990 to 1995, he worked as a research scientist in the Applied Research Area at Bell Communications Research in Morristown, New Jersey. Between 1995 and 1996, he was a TRB review committee member for the Telecommunication Laboratories (TL) of Chunghwa Telecom Co., Ltd. Since 1995, he has been a professor in the Department of Computer Science and Information Engineering at National Chiao Tung University. In 1996, he served as deputy director of the Microelectronics and Information Systems Research Center (MIRC) at NCTU, and from 1996 to 1997, he was a consultant for the Computer & Communication Research Laboratories at the Industrial Technology Research Institute (CCL/ITRI). From 1997 to 1999, he was chairman of the Department of Computer Science and Information Engineering at National Chiao Tung University. Since 1999, he has also been an adjunct research fellow at Academia Sinica. Beginning in 2002, he has served as chair professor in the Department of Computer Science and Information Management at Providence University in Shalu, Taiwan. From 2004 to 2006, he was dean of the Office of Research and Development at National Chiao Tung University, and from 2006 to 2011, he served as dean of the College of Computer Science at NCTU. He has been a member of the International Advisory Board of the Alpine Research and Development Lab for Networks and Telematics at the University of Trento in Italy. Since 2009, he has been a member of the Board of Directors of Chunghwa Telecommunications, and since 2011, he has served as vice president of National Chiao Tung University.

== Publications ==
- Lin is the co-author of three books Wireless and Mobile Network Architecture (co-author with Imrich Chlamtac; published by John Wiley, 2001), Wireless and Mobile All-IP Networks (co-author with Ai-Chun Pang, John Wiley, 2005), and Charging for Mobile All-IP Telecommunications (John Wiley, 2008).
- Chiou, T., Tsai, S., & Lin, Y. (2014). Network security management with traffic pattern clustering. SOFT COMPUTING.
- Yang, S., Lin, Y., Gan, C., Lin, Y., & Wu, C. (2014). Multi-link Mechanism for Heterogeneous Radio Networks. Wireless Personal Communications.
- Lin, Y., Liou, R., Sung, Y. Coral, & Cheng, P. (2014). Performance Evaluation of LTE eSRVCC with Limited Access Transfers. IEEE Transactions on Wireless Communications.
- Lin, P., & Lin, Y. (2014). An IP-Based Packet Test Environment for TD-LTE and LTE FDD. IEEE Communications Magazine.
- Hung, H., Lin, Y., & Luo, C. (2014). Deriving the distributions for the numbers of short message arrivals. Wireless Communications and Mobile Computing.
- Liou, R., Lin, Y., Chang, Y., Hung, H., Peng, N., & Chang, M. (2013). Deriving the Vehicle Speeds from a Mobile Telecommunications Network. IEEE Transactions on Intelligent Transportation Systems.
- Lin, Y., Liou, R., Chen, Y., & Wu, Z. (2013). Automatic event-triggered call-forwarding mechanism for mobile phones. Wireless Communications and Mobile Computing.
- Fu, H., Lin, P., & Lin, Y. (2013). Reducing Signaling Overhead for Femtocell/Macrocell Networks. IEEE Transactions on Mobile Computing.
- Sanchez-Esguevillas, A., Carro, B., Camarillo, G., Lin, Y., Garcia-Martin, M. A., & Hanzo, L. (2013). IMS: The New Generation of Internet-Protocol-Based Multimedia Services. Proceedings of the IEEE.
- Yang, S., Cheng, W., Hsu, Y., Gan, C., & Lin, Y. (2013). Charge scheduling of electric vehicles in highways. Mathematical and Computer Modeling.
- Lin, Y., Huang-Fu, C., & Alrajeh, N. (2013). Predicting Human Movement Based on Telecom's Handoff in Mobile Networks. IEEE Transactions on Mobile Computing.
- Lin, Y., Lin, P., Sung, Y. Coral, Chen, Y., Chen, W., Alrajeh, N., Lin, B. Paul, & Gan, C. (2013). Performance Measurements of TD-LTE, Wimax and 3G Systems. IEEE Wireless Communications.
- Chuang, C., Lin, Y., & Ren, Z. Julie (2013). chapter preloading mechanism for e-reader in mobile environment. Information Sciences.
- Yang, S., Wang, H., Gan, C., & Lin, Y. (2013). Mobile charging information management for smart grid networks. International Journal of Information Technology.
- Liou, R., & Lin, Y. (2013). Mobility management with the central-based location area policy. Computer Networks.
- 鄭., Cheng, P., 林., 陳., Lin, Y., & Chen, R. (2013). 長期演進技術之加強單一無線語音通話連續性的限制通話轉移次數研究.
- 林., Lin, P., 林., 陳., Lin, Y., & Chen, W. (2013). 行動電信網路之IP封包量測.
- 劉., Liou, R., 林., & Lin, Y. (2013). LTE 移動管理及其對通話控制影響之研究.
- 羅., Luo, C., 林., 蘇., Lin, Y., & Sou, S. (2013). 簡訊傳送模型之研究.
- 吳., Wu, C., 林., & Lin, Y. (2013). 以多重無線存取技術強化高速列車無線傳輸之研究.

== Awards ==
- 1997, 1999 and 2001 Distinguished Research Awards from National Science Council
- 1998 Outstanding Youth Electrical Engineer Award from CIEE
- 2003 IEEE Fellow for contributions to the design and modeling of mobile telecommunications networks and leadership in personal communications services education.
- 2003 ACM Fellow
- 2004 AAAS Fellow
- 2004 K.-T. Li Outstanding Award
- 2005 IET/IEE Fellow
- 2005 Pan WY Distinguished Research Award
- 2005 Teco Award
- 2005 Medal of Information, IICM
- 2006 Best Impact Award, IEEE Taipei Section
- 2006 ISI Highly Cited Scholar (Author Publication Number: A0096-206-L)
- 2006 Academic Publication Award of The Sun Yat-Sen Cultural Foundation
- 2006 Academic Award of the Ministry of Education
- 2007 KT Hou Honored Award
- 2007 HP Technology for Teaching Higher Education Grant Award
- 2007 YZ Hsu Technology Cathedra Award
- 2008 Award for Outstanding contributions in Science and Technology, Executive Yuan
- 2009 IBM Shared University Research Award
- 2010 IBM Faculty Award
- 2010 IEEE Region 10 Academia-Industry Partnership Award
- 2010 IEEE Vehicular Technology Society "Top Associate Editor"
- 2011 TWAS Prize in Engineering Sciences
- 2011 National Chair Award, Ministry of Education
