= Henry Sun =

Taiwanese politician

Sun Yi-han
- 孫以瀚

Deputy Minister of National Science Council
- In office 20 May 2012 – 2 March 2014
- Minister: Cyrus Chu
- Preceded by: Chang Ching-fong
- Succeeded by: Position abolished

Personal details
- Education: National Taiwan University (BS); California Institute of Technology (PhD)

Sun Yi-han (Chinese: 孫以瀚; pinyin: Sūn Yǐhàn), also known by his English name Henry Sun, is a Taiwanese molecular biologist. He was the Deputy Minister of the National Science Council (now Ministry of Science and Technology) of the Executive Yuan from May 2012 until March 2014.

== Education ==
After graduating from National Hsinchu Senior High School, Sun studied botany at National Taiwan University and graduated with his Bachelor of Science (B.S.) in 1978. He then won a scholarship to complete doctoral studies in the United States at the California Institute of Technology, where he earned his Ph.D. in molecular biology in 1986. His doctoral dissertation was titled, "Organization and Evolution of the Class I Genes in the Murine Major Histocompatibility Complex," and was completed under biology professor Leroy Hood. From 1986 to 1988, Sun was a postdoctoral researcher at Yale University.

== Early career ==
Prior to and after his appointment as the NSC Deputy Minister, Sun was a researcher at the Institute of Molecular Biology of the Academia Sinica, Taiwan's national research institute.
