= Mou Chung-yuan =

Taiwanese politician

- 牟中原

Deputy Minister of National Science Council of the Republic of China
- In office 20 May 2012 – 2 March 2014
- Minister: Cyrus Chu
- Preceded by: Chen Cheng-hong
- Succeeded by: Position abolished

Personal details
- Born: 1949 (age 76–77)
- Education: National Taiwan University (BS); Washington University in St. Louis (PhD)

Mou Chung-yuan (Chinese: 牟中原; pinyin: Móu Zhōngyuán; born 1949) is a Taiwanese chemist. He was the Deputy Minister of the National Science Council (NSC) of the Executive Yuan in May 2012 until March 2014.

== Career ==
Mou earned a bachelor's degree from National Taiwan University in 1970 and pursued graduate study in the United States, completing his Ph.D. in chemistry at Washington University in St. Louis in 1975 under professor Ronald Lovett. Before assuming his role at the National Science Council, Mou was a professor of chemistry at National Taiwan University. He was elected a member of The World Academy of Sciences in 2013, and the Academia Sinica in 2016.
