= Yang Hung-duen =

Taiwanese physicist

- 楊弘敦
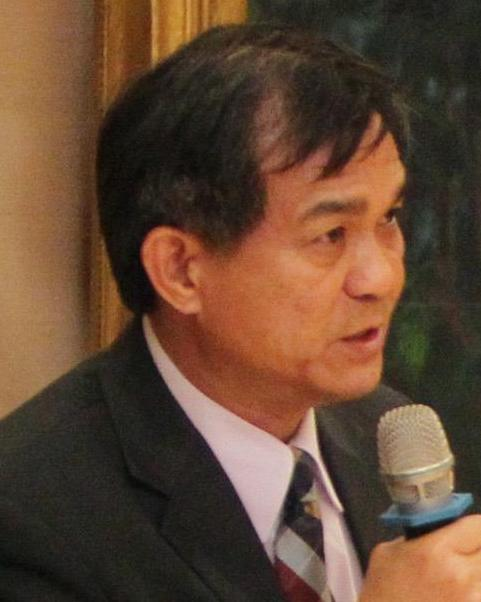
- Yang in 2014

Minister of Science and Technology
- In office 20 May 2016 – 7 February 2017
- Deputy: Tsai Mi-ching, Chiu Jeng-jiann
- Vice: Chen Ter-shing
- Preceded by: Shyu Jyuo-min
- Succeeded by: Chen Liang-gee

President of National Sun Yat-sen University
- In office October 2008 – 19 May 2016
- Preceded by: Chang Tsung-jen (張宗仁)
- Succeeded by: Wu Chi-hua (吳濟華)

Deputy Minister of National Science Council of the Republic of China
- In office 2006–2008
- Minister: Maw-Kuen Wu; Chen Chien-jen; Lee Lou-chuang
- Preceded by: Liao Chun-cheng (廖俊臣)
- Succeeded by: Lih-Juann Chen

Personal details
- Born: 3 September 1965 (age 60) Meinong, Kaohsiung County, Taiwan
- Education: National Taiwan Normal University (BS); Iowa State University (PhD)

Yang Hung-duen (traditional Chinese: 楊弘敦; simplified Chinese: 杨弘敦; pinyin: Yáng Hóngdūn; born 3 September 1965) is a Taiwanese physicist. Yang was the president of National Sun Yat-sen University from 2008 to 2016, when he was selected to lead the National Science and Technology Council.

== Education ==
Yang graduated from National Taiwan University with a Bachelor of Science (B.S.) in physics, then completed doctoral studies in the United States at Iowa State University, where he earned his Ph.D. in physics in 1987. His doctoral dissertation, completed under physicist Robert N. Shelton, was titled, "Superconductivity, magnetism, and charge density wave formation in ternary compounds with the scandium(5)cobalt(4)silicon(10)-type structure".

== Academic career ==
After receiving his doctorate, he returned to Taiwan for a teaching position at National Sun Yat-sen University. He was a visiting professor at Wayne State University from 1999 to 2000.

Yang led the Division of Natural Sciences and Mathematics at the National Science Council from 2001 to 2004, when he left for the Academia Sinica. He rejoined the NSC in 2006 as a deputy minister. In 2008, Yang was named President of National Sun Yat-sen University. In April 2016, he was appointed Minister of Science and Technology.

== Works ==
- Yang, Hung-Duen (1987). "Superconductivity, magnetism, and charge density wave formation in ternary compounds with the Sc5Co4Si10-type structure". Iowa State University. (Dissertation)
