= Chiang Cheng-wei =

Chiang Cheng-wei (Chinese: 蔣正偉) is a Taiwanese physicist.

Chiang earned a Bachelor of Science at National Tsing Hua University in 1993, and completed a PhD at Carnegie Mellon University in 2000. He then conducted postdoctoral research at the Enrico Fermi Institute, Argonne National Laboratory, and the University of Wisconsin–Madison before returning to Taiwan for an adjunct associate research fellowship at Academia Sinica, and an academic staff position at National Central University. He began as an assistant professor in 2004, became an associate professor in 2007, advanced to a full professorship in 2011, and was named to a distinguished professorship in 2013. In 2016, he joined the National Taiwan University faculty as a distinguished professor.

Alongside colleagues Kao Ying-jer and Lin Minn-tsong, Chiang was elected a fellow of the American Physical Society in 2025, the first time in National Taiwan University's history that three faculty members had been honored as part of the same class of fellows. Chiang's citation acknowledged him "[f]or significant contributions to phenomenology in rare decay processes, CP violation, and proposals in searching for new physics beyond the Standard Model, as well as for outstanding leadership in strengthening Asia-Pacific and international collaboration in particle physics research and education."
