= Wu Cheng-chung =

Wu Cheng-chung may refer to:

- John Baptist Wu (1925–2002), Chinese-born Roman Catholic prelate
- Wu Tsung-tsong (born 1955), Taiwanese politician
