= Chiu Jeng-jiann =

Taiwanese engineer

- 裘正健

Deputy Minister of Science and Technology of the Republic of China
- Incumbent
- Assumed office 20 May 2016
- Minister: Yang Hung-duen
- Vice: Chen Ter-shing

Personal details
- Education: Chung Yuan Christian University (BS); National Cheng Kung University (PhD)

Chiu Jeng-jiann (Chinese: 裘正健; pinyin: Qiú Zhèngjiàn) is a Taiwanese engineer. He has been the Deputy Minister of Science and Technology since 20 May 2016.

== Education ==
Chiu graduated from Chung Yuan Christian University with a bachelor's degree in mechanical engineering in 1986 and earned his Ph.D. in aeronautics and astronautics from National Cheng Kung University in 1992. His doctoral dissertation was titled, "Calculation of flow field in a three-dimensional manifold using a covariant velocity calculation program and a regional grid method" (利用協變速度計算程序及區域式格點法於三維分歧管流場之計算研究).
