= Ai-Chun Pang =

Taiwanese computer scientist

Ai-Chun Pang (Chinese: 逄愛君) is a Taiwanese computer scientist specializing in mobile networks, edge computing, and the artificial intelligence of things. She is a professor in the Department of Computer Science and Information Engineering of National Taiwan University.

== Education and career ==
Pang was a student of computer science and information engineering at National Chiao Tung University, where she earned a bachelor's degree in 1996, master's degree in 1998, and Ph.D. in 2002. Her doctoral dissertation, Wireless Voice over IP, was supervised by Lin Yi-bing.

Since completing her doctorate in 2002, she has been a member of the Department of Computer Science and Information Engineering at National Taiwan University, where she is a full professor, and associate dean of the College of Electrical Engineering and Computer Science.

As well, she co-founded startup company OmniEyes, Inc., in 2017.

== Book ==
Pang is a coauthor of the book Wireless and Mobile All-IP Networks (with Lin Yi-bing, Wiley, 2005).

== Recognition ==
Pang was a distinguished lecturer of the IEEE Vehicular Technology Society for 2018–2020. In 2020 she became the inaugural recipient of the Vehicular Technology Society's Women's Distinguished Career Award, recognized "for resource management and service development for mobile edge/fog networks". She was named an IEEE Fellow, in the 2021 class of fellows, "for contributions to resource management and service provisioning for mobile edge networks".
