= Daqiao railway station =

Railway station in Tainan, Taiwan

Daqiao 大橋
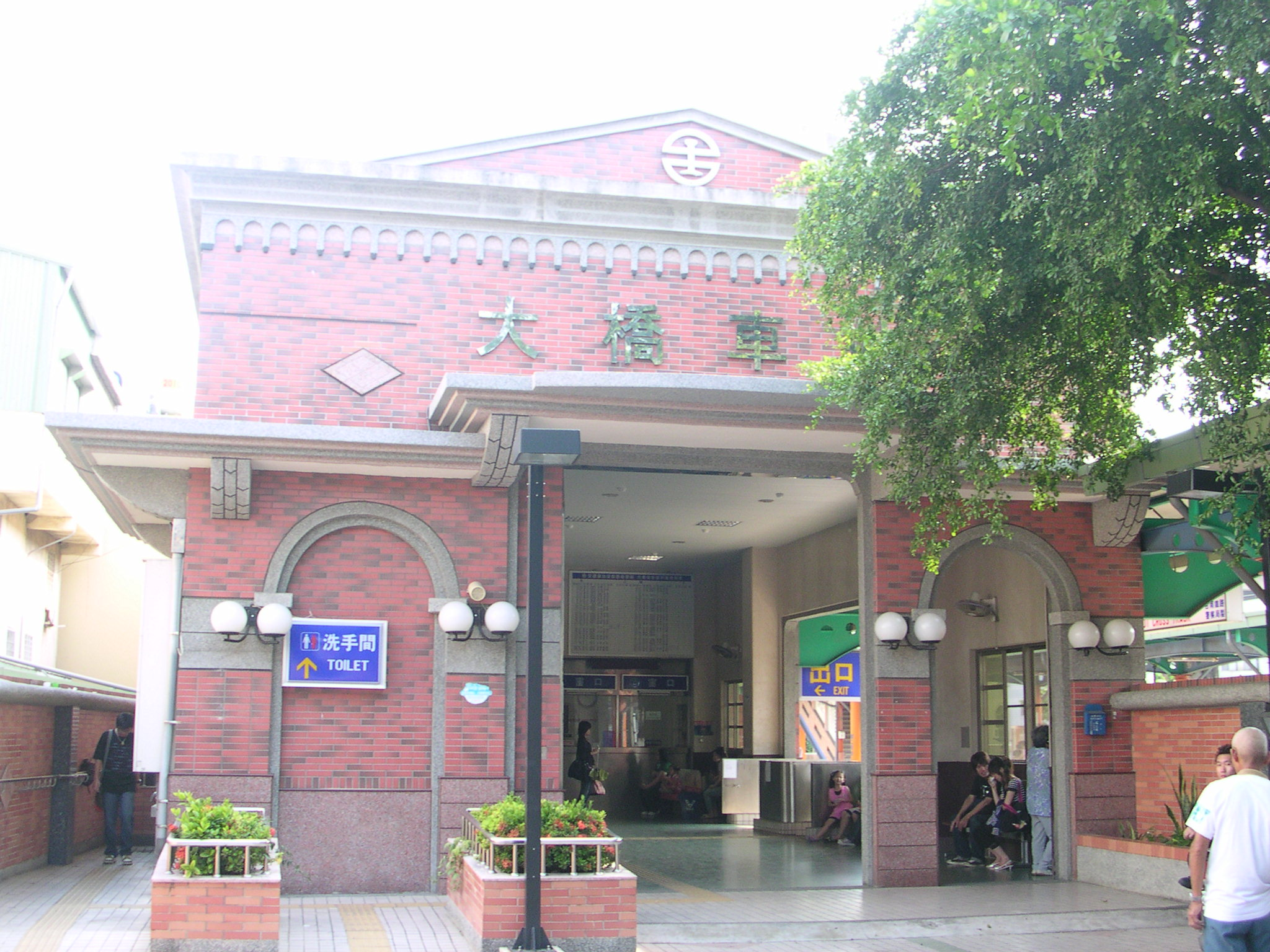

General information
- Location: Yongkang, Tainan, Taiwan
- Coordinates: 23°01′08″N 120°13′27″E
- Operated by: Taiwan Railway Corporation
- Line: Western Trunk line
- Distance: 350.5 km from Keelung

Construction
- Structure type: Surface

Other information
- Station code: 4210
- Classification: 簡易站 (Taiwan Railways Administration level)

History
- Opened: 4 October 2002
Location

Daqiao (Chinese: 大橋車站; pinyin: Dàqiáo Chēzhàn) is a railway station of the Taiwan Railway West Coast line located in Yongkang District, Tainan, Taiwan.

== Around the station ==
- Chi Mei Medical Center
- Southern Taiwan University of Science and Technology
- National Tainan Industrial High School

== See also ==
- List of railway stations in Taiwan

Preceding station	Taiwan Railway	Following station
Yongkang towards Keelung	Western Trunk line	Tainan towards Pingtung
