= Hou Sheng-mao =

Taiwanese physician-scientist

- 侯勝茂
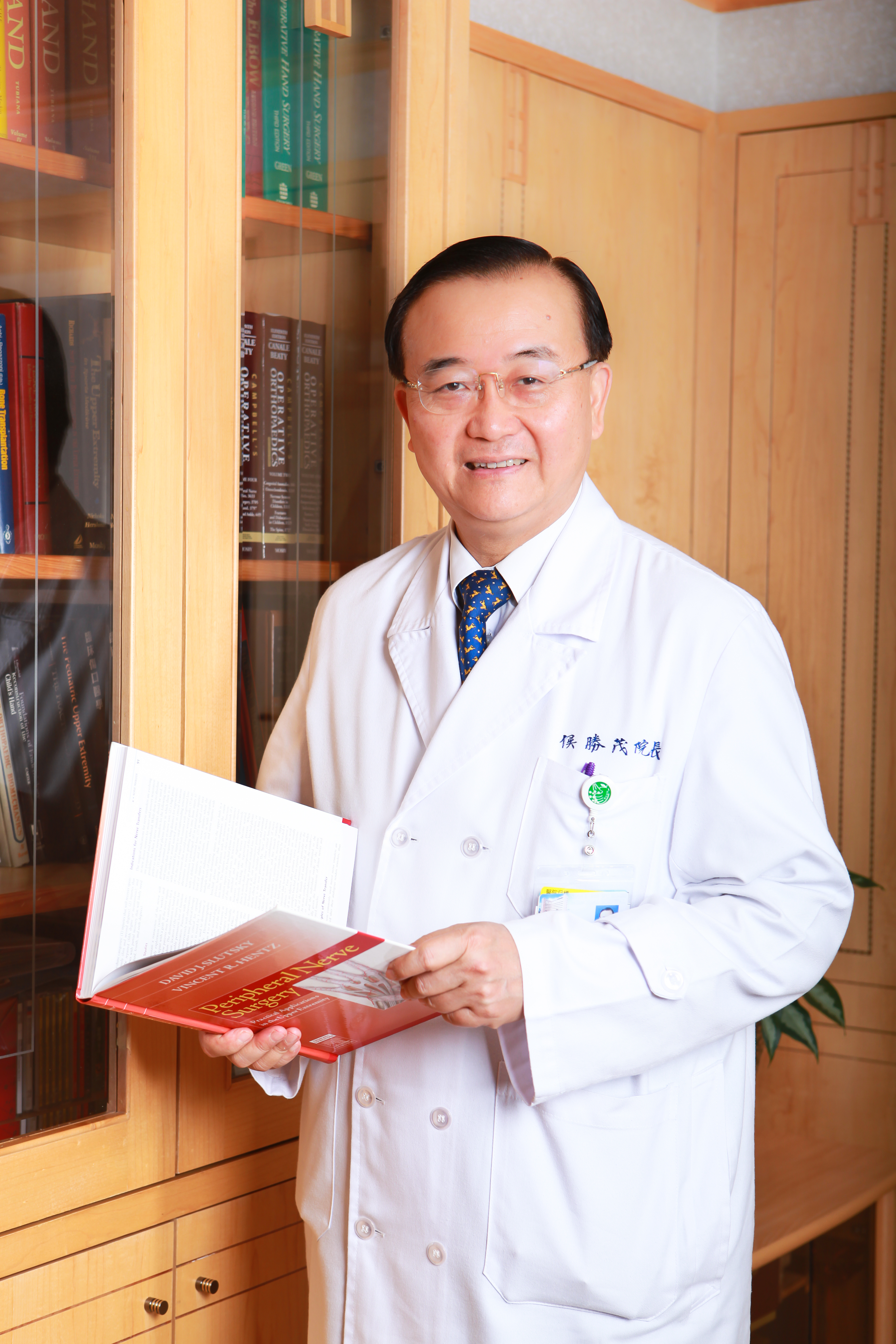

Minister of Department of Health of the Republic of China
- In office 17 February 2005 – 19 May 2008
- Preceded by: Chen Chien-jen; Wang Hsiu-hong (acting)
- Succeeded by: Lin Fang-yue

Personal details
- Born: 1 July 1950 (age 75) Taiwan
- Education: National Taiwan University (MD, PhD); Johns Hopkins University (MPH)

Hou Sheng-mao (Chinese: 侯勝茂; pinyin: Hóu Shèngmào) is a Taiwanese physician-scientist. He was the Minister of Department of Health from 2005 to 2008.

== Education ==
After graduating from National Chiayi Senior High School in 1968, Hou attended medical school at National Taiwan University, where he earned his Doctor of Medicine (M.D.) in 1975 and earned his Ph.D. in clinical medicine in 1988. His doctoral dissertation, completed under Professor Liu Tang-gui (劉堂桂), was titled, "Factors affecting microsurgical success" (Chinese: 影響顯微手術成功因素之探討).

After receiving his doctorate, Hou completed advanced studies in the United States at Johns Hopkins University, where he earned a Master of Public Health (M.P.H.) from the Bloomberg School of Public Health in 1998.

== Early career ==
Hou was the vice superintendent of National Taiwan University Hospital, and director and professor of the School of Medicine of NTU.

== Department of Health ==
The nomination of Hou was announced by Premier Frank Hsieh in February 2005.
