= Yongkang railway station (Taiwan) =

Railway station in Tainan, Taiwan

Yongkang 永康
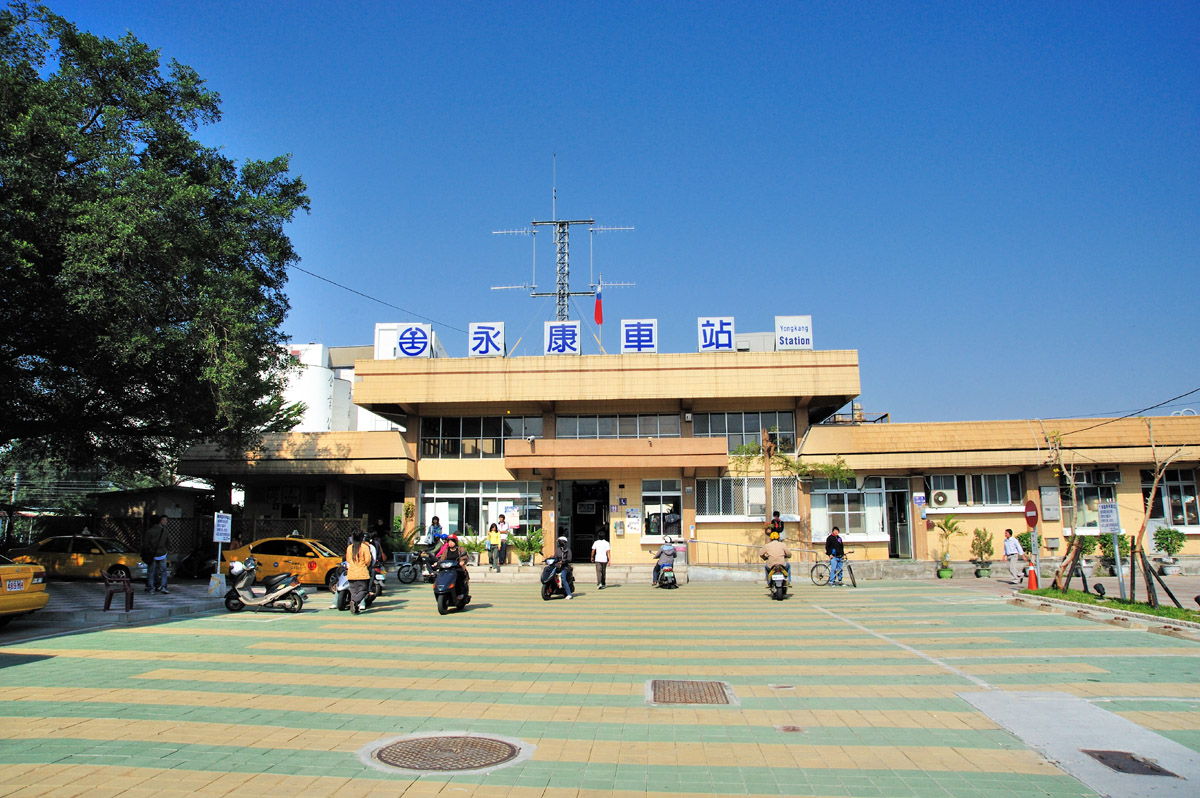

General information
- Location: No. 459, Jhongshan Rd., Yongkang, Tainan, Taiwan
- Coordinates: 23°02′19.1″N 120°15′12.3″E
- Operated by: Taiwan Railway
- Line: Western Trunk line (174)
- Distance: 346.8 km from Keelung
- Connections: Bus stop

Construction
- Structure type: Surface

Other information
- Classification: 二等站 (Taiwan Railways Administration level)

History
- Opened: 10 March 1903
- Rebuilt: 4 March 1991
- Previous names: (Japanese: 鳥松庄停車場)

Passengers
- 6,144 daily (2024)
Location

Yongkang (Chinese: 永康車站; pinyin: Yǒngkāng Chēzhàn) is a railway station of the Taiwan Railway West Coast line located in Yongkang District, Tainan City, Taiwan.

== Around the station ==
- Freeway 1
- Yongkang District Administration Center
- Tainan Municipal Yongkang Junior High School
- The Affiliated Senior High School of National University of Tainan
- Tainan University of Technology

== See also ==
- List of railway stations in Taiwan

Preceding station	Taiwan Railway	Following station
Xinshi towards Keelung	Western Trunk line	Daqiao towards Pingtung
