= Weng Cheng-yi =

Taiwanese mechanical engineer

- Education: University of Rochester (PhD)

Chinese name
- Traditional Chinese: 翁政義
- Hanyu Pinyin: Wēng Zhèngyì
- Hokkien POJ: Ong Chèng-gī
- Tâi-lô: Ong Tsìng-gī

Weng Cheng-yi (Chinese: 翁政義; pinyin: Wēng Zhèngyì; Pe̍h-ōe-jī: Ong Chèng-gī) is a Taiwanese mechanical engineer.

== Education and career ==
Weng earned a doctorate in mechanical engineering from the University of Rochester. He joined the National Cheng Kung University faculty in 1980. Weng became president of NCKU in 1997. He was the inaugural chairman of the Aviation Safety Council, serving from 25 May 1998 to 19 May 2000. He was minister of the National Science Council from 20 May 2000 to 6 March 2001. Days after taking office, Weng was criticized by members of the Legislative Yuan for being unaware of council proceedings. An anonymous legislator accused Weng of plagiarism in June 2000. Later that month, health department director Lee Ming-liang panned several government officials for smoking, including Weng.

As chair of the National Science Council, Weng was cautious of scientific exchanges with China, choosing to work with the Japanese government on a high-energy synchrotron radiation beamline installed in Hyogo Prefecture. Additionally, Weng commented on earthquake response and recovery, and attended the Industry Strategy Symposium 2000. Weng worked to establish the Tainan Science-based Industrial Park throughout his tenure. He was replaced by Wei Che-ho in March 2001, after the industrial park initiative proved unsuccessful. Weng later served as chairman of the Industrial Technology Research Institute. He returned to the Aviation Safety Council as acting chairman in 2005.
