= Order of Dr. Sun Yat-sen =

Civilian order of the Republic of China (Taiwan)

Order of Dr. Sun Yat-sen 中山勳章
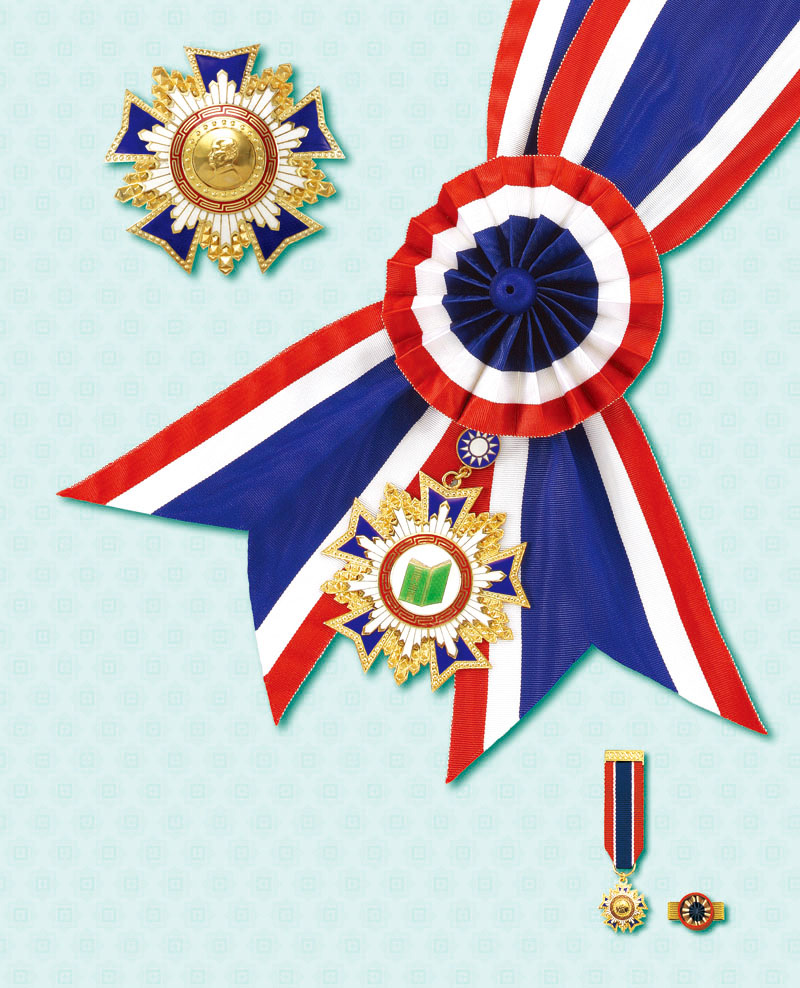
- Order of Dr. Sun Yat-Sen cordon, badge, star, medal and lapel pin
- Type: Single-grade Grand Cordon
- Awarded for: In commemoration of the Founding Father as well as a token of thanks to those who make very outstanding contributions to this country.
- Description: The main medal has a portrait of Sun Yat-sen, founding father of the ROC, and the accompanying medal has a picture of a volume of the Three Principles of the People, which is the guiding principle of the ROC's national development.
- Country: Republic of China (Taiwan)
- Presented by: President of the Republic of China (Taiwan)
- Eligibility: Civilian
- Status: Active
- Established: 1941
- First award: Cheng Chao
- Final award: Chen Chien-jen

Highlights
- Total: 4
- Ribband of the order

Precedence
- Next (higher): Order of Brilliant Jade
- Next (lower): Order of Chiang Chung-Cheng

The Order of Dr. Sun Yat-sen (Chinese: 中山勳章) is a civilian order of the Republic of China that was instituted in 1941. It is given in commemoration of Sun Yat-sen, and as a token of thanks to those who make outstanding contributions to the Republic of China. It has only been awarded six times: twice in 1944 to Cheng Chao and Chung Yu, associates of Sun Yat-sen, and subsequently to Vice Presidents of the Republic of China, Annette Lu in 2008, Chen Chien-jen in 2020, and William Lai in 2024, as well as TSMC founder Morris Chang in 2024.
