= Chen Chien-jen =

Taiwanese epidemiologist and politician (born 1951)

Chen Chien-jen OS KSG KHS
- 陳建仁
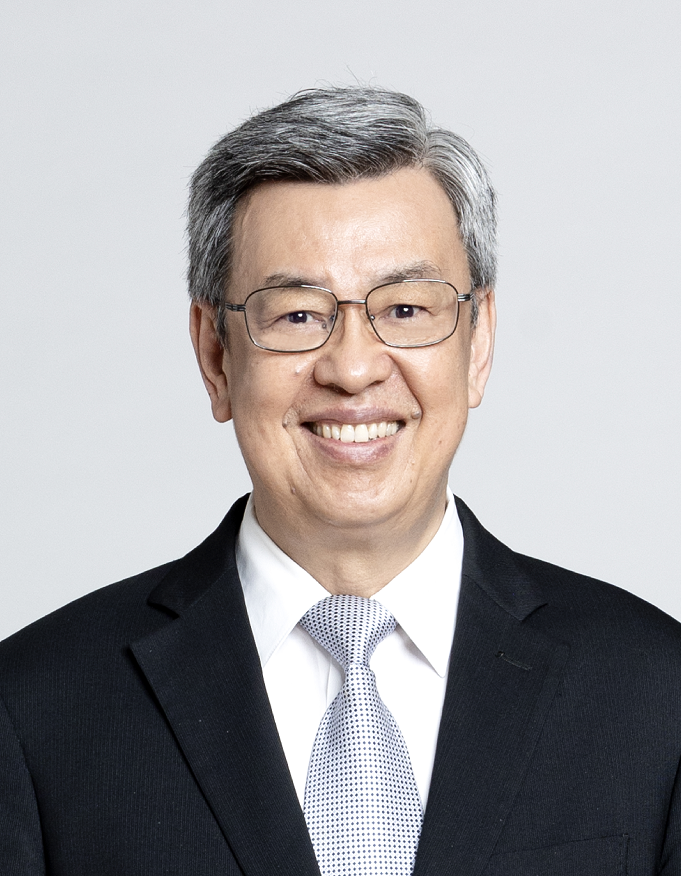
- Official portrait, 2023

10th President of Academia Sinica
- Incumbent
- Assumed office 21 June 2026
- Appointed by: Lai Ching-te
- Vice President: 1st Vice President; Peng Shin-kun; 2nd Vice President; Tsay Yi-Fang; 3rd Vice President; Chen Yu-ju
- Preceded by: James C. Liao

28th Premier of the Republic of China
- In office 31 January 2023 – 20 May 2024
- President: Tsai Ing-wen
- Vice Premier: Cheng Wen-tsan
- Preceded by: Su Tseng-chang
- Succeeded by: Cho Jung-tai

11th Vice President of the Republic of China
- In office 20 May 2016 – 20 May 2020
- President: Tsai Ing-wen
- Preceded by: Wu Den-yih
- Succeeded by: Lai Ching-te

Vice President of the Academia Sinica
- In office 18 October 2011 – 16 November 2015
- President: Chi-Huey Wong
- Preceded by: Andrew H. J. Wang
- Succeeded by: Andrew H. J. Wang
Ministerial offices
12th Minister of National Science
In office 25 January 2006 – 19 May 2008
Premier	Su Tseng-chang; Chang Chun-hsiung
Deputy	Wu Tsung-tsong; Yang Hung-duen
Preceded by	Maw-Kuen Wu
Succeeded by	Lee Lou-chuang
9th Minister of Health
In office 18 May 2003 – 1 February 2005
Premier	Yu Shyi-kun
Preceded by	Twu Shiing-jer
Succeeded by	Wang Hsiu-hong (acting); Hou Sheng-mao

Personal details
- Born: 6 June 1951 (age 75) Cishan, Taiwan
- Party: DPP (after 2022); Independent (before 2022)
- Education: National Taiwan University (BS, MPH); Johns Hopkins University (DSc)
- Scientific career
- Fields: Genetic epidemiology
- Thesis: A twin study of blood pressure, serum cholesterol and triglyceride levels in Chinese adolescents (1983)
- Doctoral advisor: Pien-Chien Huang

Chinese name
- Traditional Chinese: 陳建仁
- Simplified Chinese: 陈建仁
Transcriptions
Standard Mandarin
- Hanyu Pinyin: Chén Jiànrén
- Wade–Giles: Ch'ên^{2} Chien^{4}-jên^{2}
- Tongyong Pinyin: Chén Jiànrén
- IPA: [ʈʂʰə̌n tɕjɛ̂n.ɻə̌n]
Southern Min
- Hokkien POJ: Tân Kiàn-jîn

Chen Chien-jen OS KSG KHS (Chinese: 陳建仁; pinyin: Chén Jiànrén; born 6 June 1951) is a Taiwanese epidemiologist, geneticist, and politician who served as Vice President of the Republic of China from 2016 to 2020 and Premier of the Republic of China from 2023 to 2024. He has been the president of Academia Sinica since 2026.

After earning his doctorate from Johns Hopkins University, Chen was a professor of medicine at National Taiwan University and served as the head of the Ministry of Health from 2003 to 2005. He later headed the National Science Council between 2006 and 2008. Chen then served as a vice president of Academia Sinica from 2011 to 2015. Later that year, Chen joined Tsai Ing-wen on the Democratic Progressive Party presidential ticket and served as the vice president of the Republic of China from 2016 to 2020. Chen joined the DPP in 2022 and was appointed premier in January 2023.

He was a member of the Board of Trustees of Fu Jen Catholic University before running for the presidential election and served as Fu Jen's Robert J. Ronald Chair Professor after leaving office.

== Early life and education ==
Chen was born in Cishan, Kaohsiung County, on June 6, 1951. He was the seventh child in a family of eight children; he has six older siblings and one younger brother. His father, Chen Hsin-an (陳新安; 1911–1988), was a Kuomintang official who served as Kaohsiung County Magistrate from 1954 to 1957. His mother, Chen Wei Lien-chih, was the manager of a daycare.

After graduating from Taipei Municipal Chien Kuo High School, Chen studied forestry at National Taiwan University (NTU). In his sophomore year, he transferred departments to study zoology instead and graduated with his Bachelor of Science (B.S.) in zoology in 1973. As an undergraduate, he was the president of a mountaineering club and founded a Salesian student society. In 1977, he obtained a Master of Public Health (M.P.H.) from the university. He then worked as a teaching assistant in public health at NTU from 1977 to 1979 and was a lecturer there from 1982 to 1983.

After receiving his master's degree, Chen completed advanced studies in the United States at Johns Hopkins University, where he studied under molecular biologist Pien-Chien Huang and epidemiologist Bernice H. Cohen. He earned his Doctor of Science (D.Sc.) in human genetics and epidemiology from the Johns Hopkins Bloomberg School of Public Health in 1983. His doctoral dissertation was titled, "A twin study of blood pressure, serum cholesterol and triglyceride levels in Chinese adolescents".

== Academic career ==
He began his medical career by researching hepatitis B, and helped raise awareness about vaccination for the disease in Taiwan. Chen further researched on the liver cancer risk of people with hepatitis B. Chen also discovered a link from arsenic to blackfoot disease. The arsenic research lead to the revision of international health standards for arsenic exposure. Between 2011 and November 2015, Chen was a vice president of Academia Sinica.

In January 2026, Chen was named the next president of Academia Sinica. A handover ceremony was conducted on 18 June, with Chen's term formally beginning on 21 June.

== Political career ==
Chen served as Minister of Health from 2003 to 2005. As health minister, he was praised for effectively managing the SARS epidemic through quarantine and screening procedures, despite Taiwan's non-membership in the World Health Organization complicating the coordination of research efforts. His successor Hou Sheng-mao credited Chen with reforming the National Health Insurance program. Chen led the National Science Council from 2006 to 2008.

=== Vice presidency (2016–2020) ===
On 16 November 2015, Chen was confirmed as the running mate for Tsai Ing-wen in the 2016 Taiwanese presidential election after media speculation earlier in the month. During the campaign, Chen became known by the nickname Brother Da-jen (大仁哥), after a character portrayed by Chen Bolin on the romantic drama In Time with You. Chen is the first Catholic vice presidential nominee in Taiwan. On 16 January 2016, Tsai and Chen won the presidential election in a landslide. Chen took up his post as Vice President on 20 May 2016.

In March 2019, Chen announced that he would not seek a second term as vice president alongside Tsai. Chen received international attention for his role in leading Taiwan's response to the COVID-19 pandemic due to his unique position as both vice president and his epidemiologist background. Days before he stepped down from the vice presidency, Chen stated that he would return to the Academia Sinica as a research fellow and thus forgo the pension connected to his political office.

=== Support for same-sex marriage ===
On May 17, 2019, the Legislative Yuan approved the same-sex marriage bill, Chen supported it by writing "The Executive Yuan has courageously assumed its responsibility, exercised its utmost wisdom and patience, and continuously communicated and coordinated with the pro and con sides in an effort to reduce social disagreements, proposing a bill that is consistent with the conclusion of the Justice's interpretation of the Constitution and responsive to the majority opinion of the referendum. In the face of the tensions between the pro and con sides, the legislators still uphold the democratic spirit of accommodating diverse opinions and complete the legislative work of the bill smoothly".

=== Premiership (2023–2024) ===
In December 2021, Chen applied to join the Democratic Progressive Party, and formally became a member in February 2022. In January 2023, he rejoined the Tsai administration as premier of Taiwan, taking office on 31 January. Chen and the members of his cabinet submitted their joint resignations on 18 January 2024.

== Personal life ==
Chen is a devout Catholic who was baptized in 1979. He is married to Lo Fong-ping, whose family is from Nanjing. Chen and his wife were invited to visit the Vatican several times by Popes John Paul II, Benedict XVI, and Francis. He has been invested as a Knight of the Equestrian of the Holy Sepulchre of Jerusalem (2010) and a Knight of the Pontifical Equestrian Order of St. Gregory the Great (2013). He has also served on the board of trustees of Fu Jen Catholic University. In April 2025, Chen was chosen to represent Taiwan at the funeral of Pope Francis, and at the Papal Inauguration of Leo XIV in May.

== Honours and awards ==
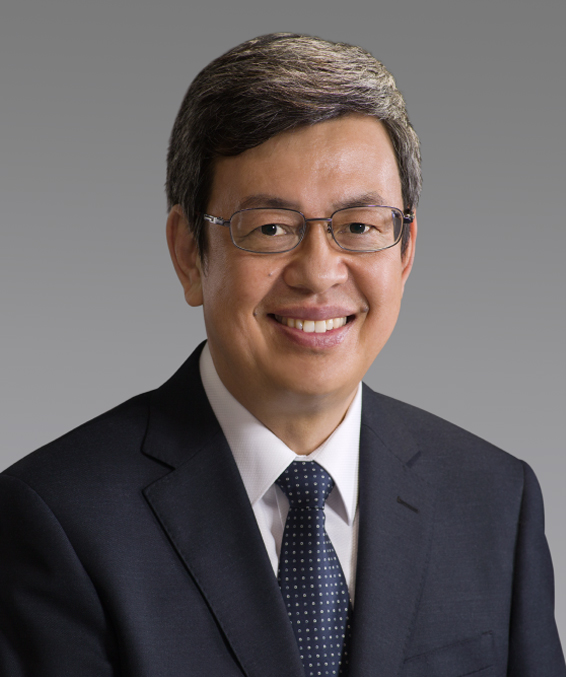
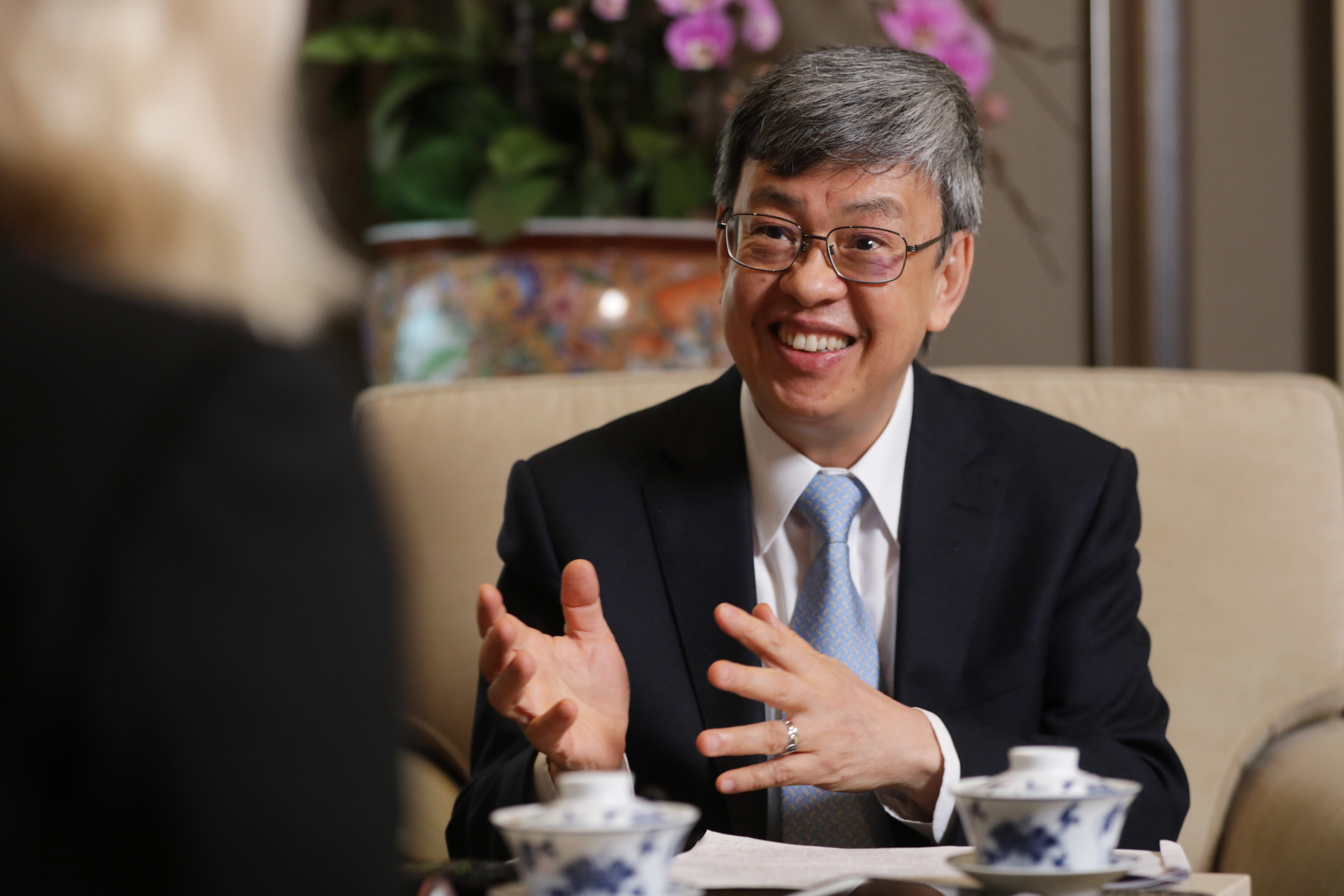
Official vice presidential portrait, 2016 (left)
Chen in an interview with The Telegraph, 2020 (right)
- 2005 Presidential Science Prize (Life Sciences)
- 2009 Officier of the Ordre des Palmes académiques (France)
- 2010 Knight of the Order of St. Gregory the Great (Vatican)
- 2013 Knight of the Order of the Holy Sepulchre (Vatican)
- 2017 Foreign associate of the National Academy of Sciences (USA)
- 2020 Order of Dr. Sun Yat-sen with Grand Cordon
- 2020 Honorary Doctorate from National Sun Yat-sen University
- 2021 Member of the Pontifical Academy of Sciences (Vatican)
- 2024 Order of Propitious Clouds with Special Grand Cordon

== See also ==
- Chen Chien-jen cabinet

Political offices
Preceded by Twu Shiing-jer	Minister of Health; 2003–2005	Succeeded by Hou Sheng-mao
Preceded by Maw-Kuen Wu	Minister of the National Science Council; 2006–2008	Succeeded by Lee Lou-chuang
Preceded by Wu Den-yih	Vice President of Taiwan; 2016–2020	Succeeded by Lai Ching-te
Preceded by Su Tseng-chang	Premier of Taiwan; 2023–2024	Succeeded by Cho Jung-tai
Party political offices
Preceded by Su Jia-chyuan	DPP nominee for Vice President of Taiwan; 2016	Succeeded by Lai Ching-te
