= Cyrus Chu =

Taiwanese economist (born 1955)

- 朱敬一

Taiwanese Representative to the WTO
- In office July 2016 – 31 August 2019
- Preceded by: Lai Shin-yuan
- Succeeded by: Vivian Lien (acting)

Minister of the National Science Council
- In office 6 February 2011 – 2 March 2014
- Deputy: Hong Ho-cheng, Lin Yi-bing, Mou Chung-yuan, Henry Sun
- Preceded by: Lee Lou-chuang
- Succeeded by: Chang San-cheng as Minister of Science and Technology

Minister without Portfolio
- In office March 2011 – February 2012

Personal details
- Born: 29 October 1955 (age 70) Taipei, Taiwan
- Education: National Taiwan University (BA); University of Michigan (MA, PhD)

Chu Chin-yi (Chinese: 朱敬一; pinyin: Zhū Jìngyī; born 29 October 1955), also known by his English name Cyrus Chu, is a Taiwanese economist.

== Early life and education ==
Chu was born in Taipei, Taiwan, on 29 October 1955. He graduated from National Taiwan University with a Bachelor of Arts (B.A.) in commerce in 1978. Chu then completed advanced studies in the United States, where he earned a Master of Arts (M.A.) in 1983 and a Ph.D. in economics from the University of Michigan in 1985 on a scholarship awarded by the Population Council. His doctoral dissertation, completed under professors John A. Laitner and Hal Varian, was titled, "Two Essays on Stochastic Income Theory".

== Academic career ==
After receiving his doctorate, Chu became an associate professor at the Department of Business Administration and Economics of National Taiwan University and was promoted to a full-time professorship in 1989. He also was a researcher at Academia Sinica. In 1998, Chu was the Olin Visiting Professor of Law and Economics at the University of Chicago.

Chu has published 2 monographs on demography and family economics, respectively, both published by Oxford University Press, and more than 100 professional articles in journals including American Economic Review and Journal of Political Economy.

Chu was Vice President of Academia Sinica (2000–2003) and Chairman of Board at Chung-Hwa Institution for Economic Research (2008-2011), and has been a Distinguished Research Fellow at the Institute of Economics, Academia Sinica since 2000. He was elected as an Academician of Academia Sinica (1998), a Member of The World Academy of Sciences (2010), Foreign Associate of the National Academy of Sciences in the United States (2017). He recently joined the WID team of Thomas Piketty, analysing the taxation and wealth-registration individual data of Taiwan. From 2011 to 2019, he served as Minister without Portfolio, supervising science and technology, then Minister of National Science Council (renamed the Ministry of Science and Technology) of Executive Yuan of Republic of China (Taiwan), then Ambassador and Permanent Representative of the Separate Customs Territory of Taiwan, Penghu, Kinmen and Matsu to the World Trade Organization in Geneva.

== National Science Council Ministry ==
Chu took office in February 2011.

=== Taiwan brain drain crisis ===
During an August 2012 conference, Chu commented on the growing brain drain in Taiwan, stating that more and more Taiwanese move to Mainland China due to better job offers and benefits. He added that due to the conservative nature of Taiwanese society, most foreign workers in Taiwan are blue-collar workers, and the remaining white-collar workers typically teach English, and are not leaders of big companies.

The National Science Council was later renamed the Ministry of Science and Technology, and in March 2014, Chu stepped down to be replaced by Chang San-cheng.

== Representative to the World Trade Organization ==
Chu succeeded Lai Shin-yuan as Taiwan's representative to the World Trade Organization in July 2016. He was sworn in a month later, on 2 August. In March 2017, Chu was elected a member of the United States National Academy of Sciences. Chu submitted his resignation on 23 August 2019, and it became effective on 31 August 2019.

== Selected publications ==
- Population Dynamics: A New Economic Approach, Oxford University Press, 1998.
- Population and Economic Change in East Asia: a supplement to Population and Development Review, edited with Ronald Demos Lee, 2000.
- Understanding Chinese Families: A Comparative Study of Taiwan and Southeast China, with Ruoh-Rong Yu, foreword by James J. Heckman, Oxford University Press, 2009.
