= Wu Tsung-tsong =

Taiwanese mechanical engineer and academic (born 1955)

- 吳政忠
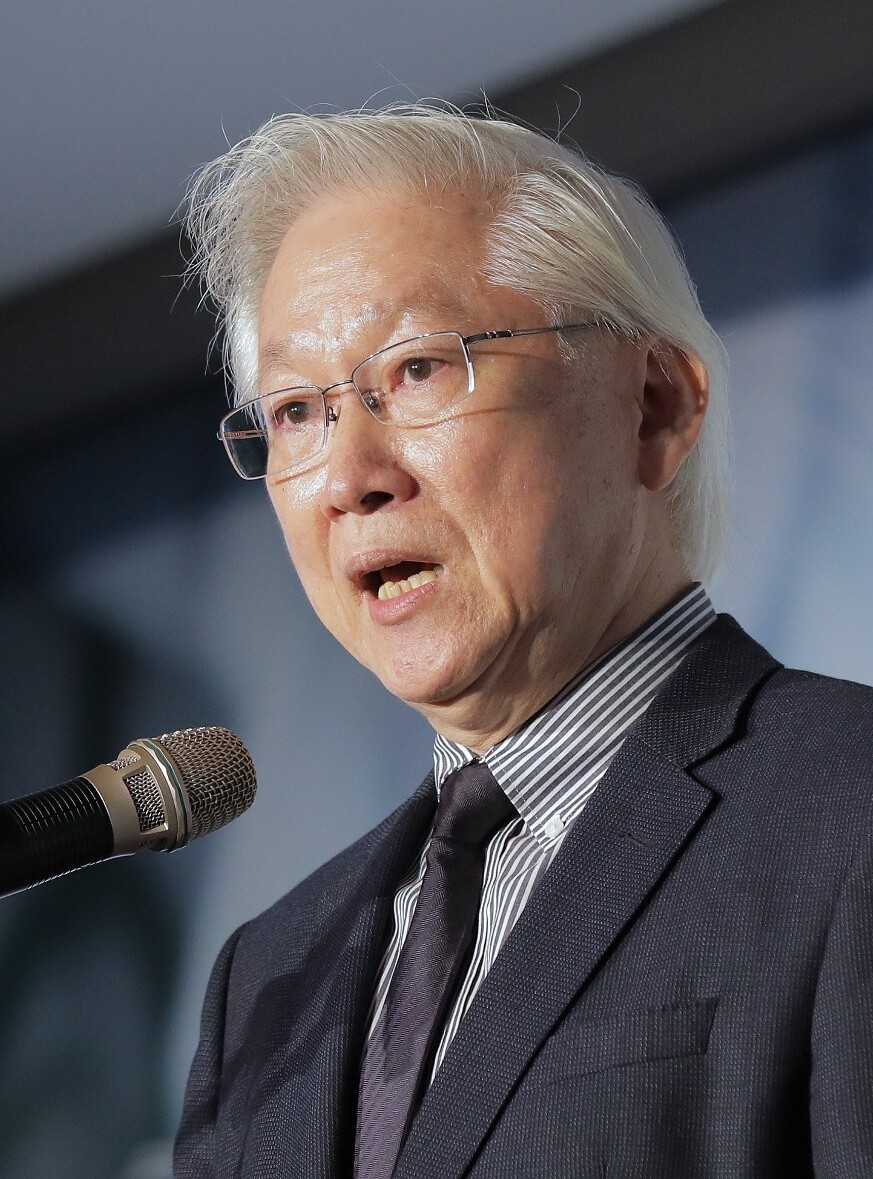
- Wu in 2019

5th Minister of Science and Technology
- In office 20 May 2020 – 20 May 2024 (Note: After 26 July 2022, as National Science and Technology Council)
- Premier: Su Tseng-chang; Chen Chien-jen
- Preceded by: Chen Liang-gee
- Succeeded by: Wu Cheng-wen
Additional cabinet offices
Minister without Portfolio
In office 27 July 2022 – 20 May 2024
Premier	Su Tseng-chang; Chen Chien-jen
In office 20 May 2016 – 19 May 2020
Premier	Lin Chuan; Lai Ching-te; Su Tseng-chang
Deputy Minister of the National Science Council
In office 25 January 2006 – 19 May 2008

Personal details
- Born: March 7, 1955 (age 71)
- Party: Independent
- Education: National Taiwan University (BS); Cornell University (MS, PhD)

Wu Tsung-tsong (Chinese: 吳政忠; pinyin: Wú Zhèngzhōng; born March 7, 1955) is a Taiwanese mechanical engineer and academic who served as Minister of Science and Technology from 2020 to 2024.

== Early life and education ==
Wu was born in Taiwan on March 7, 1955. After graduating from National Tainan First Senior High School, he attended National Taiwan University (NTU) and graduated from NTU with a Bachelor of Science (B.S.) in 1977 in civil engineering. He completed two years of military service in the Republic of China Armed Forces and then became a teaching assistant in the NTU Department of Civil Engineering.

In June 1981, Wu went to the United States to complete graduate studies in the wave theory of light and acoustic emission at Cornell University in Ithaca, New York. He earned his Master of Science (M.S.) and his Ph.D. in analytical mechanics and applied mechanics from Cornell in 1983 and 1987, respectively. His doctoral dissertation was titled, "Theory of Acoustoplasticity and Ultrasonic Measurements of Residual Stress," and was supervised by professors Wolfgang Sachse and Yih-Hsing Pao.

== Academic career ==
After receiving his doctorate, Wu became a professor at the Institute of Applied Mechanics of National Taiwan University.

Wu currently serves as Chairman of ITRI (July 2024–present) and has been an Honorary Professor at National Taiwan University since July 2020. From January 2023 to May 2024, he was Chairman of the Board of Directors of the National Space Center. Concurrently, from July 2022 to May 2024, he held dual roles as Chairman of the National Science and Technology Commission and Minister of State Affairs of the Executive Yuan. Between September 2020 and May 2024, he also served as Director of Taishan Investment Management Consulting Co., Ltd., and from May 2020 to May 2024, as Chairman of the Board of Directors of the National Laboratory Research Institute. From May 2020 to July 2022, he was Minister of Science and Technology.

Previously, he was Chairman of ITRI from July 2016 to October 2017 and served as Deputy Convener of the Executive Yuan Science and Technology Bulletin from June 2016 to March 2023. He also held the position of Minister of State Affairs in the Executive Yuan from May 2016 to May 2020. From May 2012 to May 2016, he was Convener of the Technology Group of the New Horizon Think Tank. Earlier, he served as Vice Chairman of the National Science Council from November 2006 to May 2008, and from January 2006 to January 2008, he was Chairman of the Chinese Society of Mechanics. He held the position of Distinguished Professor at the Institute of Applied Mechanics, National Taiwan University from August 2006 to March 2020, having previously served as Professor from July 1993 to August 2006 and Associate Professor from August 1987 to July 1993. He was also Director of the Institute of Applied Mechanics at National Taiwan University from August 1997 to July 2000 and served as Deputy Executive Secretary of the Science and Technology Advisory Group in the Executive Yuan from June 2004 to August 2005.

== Political career ==
Wu served as deputy minister of the National Science Council under Chen Chien-jen. He returned to public service as minister without portfolio specializing in technology-related policy upon the presidential inauguration of Tsai Ing-wen in 2016. From this position, Wu commented on several aspects of digital infrastructure, including the implementation of 5G telecommunications and the proliferation of fake news online. He served concurrently on the governmental Board of Science and Technology as a deputy convenor. Wu was retained in his post when William Lai assumed the premiership in September 2017. He remained as Su Tseng-chang replaced Lai in January 2019. Wu succeeded Chen Liang-gee as minister of science and technology at the start of Tsai Ing-wen's second presidential term.
