= Chen Liang-gee =

Taiwanese engineer and politician

- 陳良基
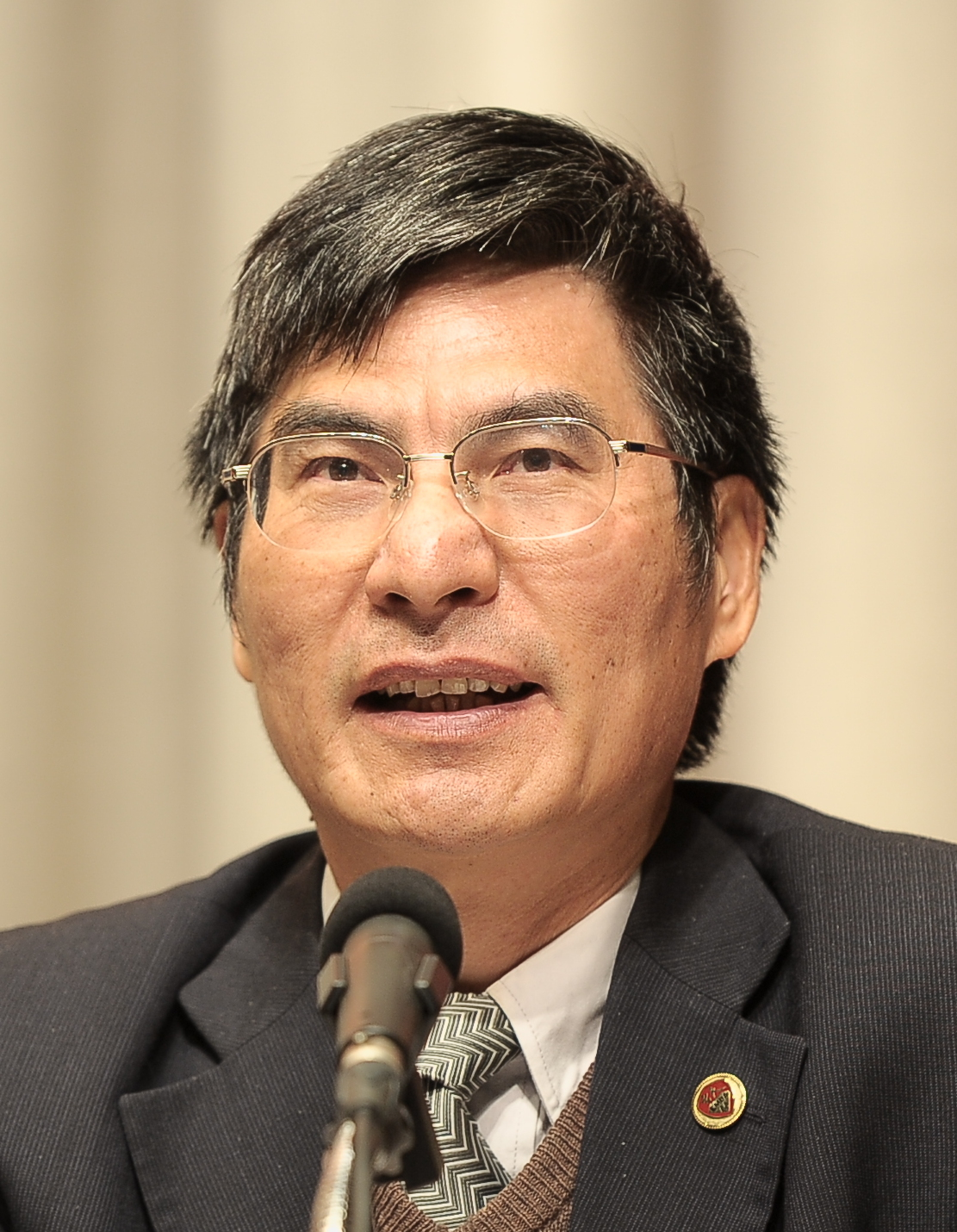

4th Minister of Science and Technology
- In office 8 February 2017 – 19 May 2020
- Prime Minister: Lin Chuan; William Lai; Su Tseng-chang
- Deputy: See list: Chen Ter-shing Tsou Yu-han
- Preceded by: Yang Hung-duen
- Succeeded by: Wu Tsung-tsong

Political Deputy Minister of Education
- In office 20 May 2016 – 7 February 2017
- Minister: Pan Wen-chung

Personal details
- Born: 23 September 1956 (age 69) Baozhong, Yunlin, Taiwan
- Education: National Cheng Kung University (BS, MS, PhD)

Chen Liang-gee (Chinese: 陳良基; pinyin: Chén Liángjī; born 23 September 1956) is a Taiwanese engineer who served as Minister of Science and Technology from 8 February 2017 to 20 May 2020.

== Early life and education ==
Chen was born in September 1956. He comes from a rural, peanut-farming family. Chen earned his bachelor's degree, master's degree, and Ph.D., all in electrical engineering from National Cheng Kung University in 1979, 1981, and 1986, respectively.

== Academic career ==
Chen is a professor of electrical engineering at National Taiwan University. He does research on video coding, circuits, chips, algorithms, and signal processing. From 2009 to 2012, he was deputy dean of college of EECS. From 2013 to 2016, he was the EVP of academic and research at National Taiwan University. Chen is a Fellow of the Institute of Electrical and Electronics Engineers from 2001.

== Political career ==
Chen was appointed deputy minister of education on 20 April 2016 by Premier-designate Lin Chuan. In February 2017, Chen was named Minister of Science and Technology. As technology minister, Chen supported the Tsai Ing-wen administration's Forward-looking Infrastructure Development Program, and sought to expand the use of educational technology and artificial intelligence in Taiwan. Chen remained technology minister under Lin and his successors William Lai and Su Tseng-chang. Chen resigned his post on 14 May 2020.
