= Wu Cheng-wen (engineer) =

Taiwanese engineer and computer scientist (born 1958)

- 吳誠文
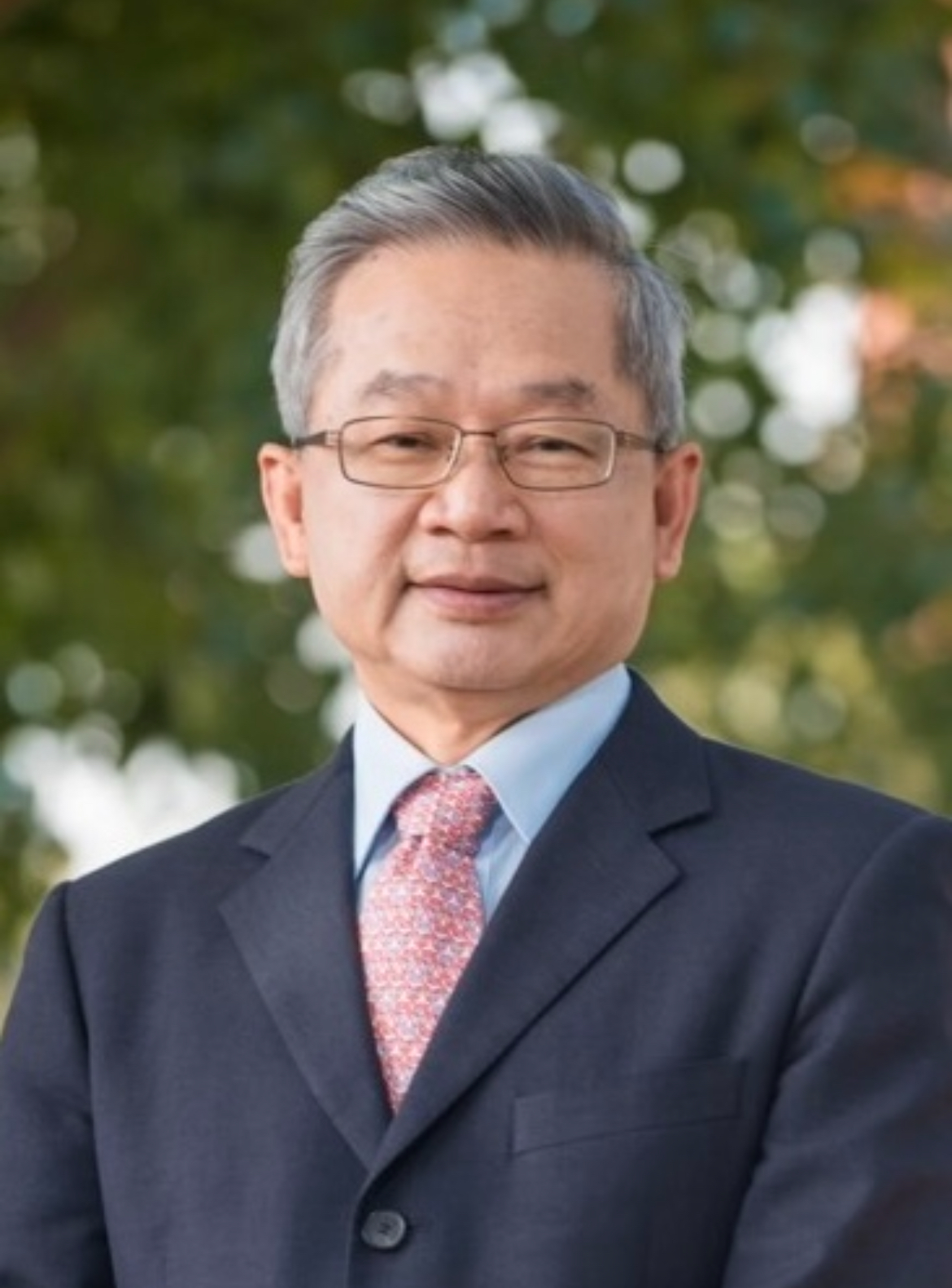
- Official portrait, 2024

6th Minister of Science and Technology
- Incumbent
- Assumed office 20 May 2024
- Premier: Cho Jung-tai
- Preceded by: Wu Tsung-tsong

Minister without Portfolio
- Incumbent
- Assumed office 20 May 2024
- Prime Minister: Cho Jung-tai
- Preceded by: Wu Tsung-tsong

President of the Southern Taiwan University of Science and Technology
- In office 2023 – 20 May 2024
- Preceded by: Lu Deng-maw
- Succeeded by: Chou De-kuang

Personal details
- Born: September 18, 1958 (age 67) Tainan, Taiwan
- Education: National Taiwan University (BS); University of California, Santa Barbara (MS, PhD)
- Scientific career
- Fields: Computer engineering
- Thesis: Computer-aided design of high-throughput digital filters and testing of iterative logic arrays (1987)

Wu Cheng-wen (Chinese: 吳誠文; born September 18, 1958) is a Taiwanese electrical engineer, computer scientist, and academic who has served as the minister of the National Science and Technology Council since 20 May 2024.

== Early life and education ==
Wu was born on September 18, 1958, in Tainan. He was an outfielder and pitcher for the Tainan Giants, representing Taiwan in the 1971 Little League World Series. He graduated from National Tainan First Senior High School.

After high school, Wu attended National Taiwan University (NTU) and graduated with his Bachelor of Science (B.S.) in electrical engineering in 1981. From 1981 to 1983, he served in the Republic of China Navy as an ensign stationed on Zuoying District. He was then a system programmer at the Ministry of Environment from 1983 to 1984.

Wu completed graduate studies in the U.S. at the University of California, Santa Barbara, where he earned his Master of Science (M.S.) and his Ph.D. in electrical engineering and computer engineering in 1985 and 1987, respectively. His doctoral dissertation was titled, "Computer-aided design of high-throughput digital filters and testing of iterative logic arrays".

== Academic career ==
After receiving his doctorate, Wu joined the National Tsing Hua University faculty in 1987. Wu later became vice president of National Tsing Hua University. In this role, Wu attended the 2016 ceremony marking the establishment of an office for the China-funded Cross-Strait Tsinghua Research Institute at NTHU. In 2017, Wu was one of eight candidates during the initial round of voting for the presidency of National Taiwan University. After education minister Pan Wen-chung drew attention to a "flawed" selection process that saw the election of Kuan Chung-ming to the post, Wu announced his intention to withdraw from further votes if interference took place in the selection of Kuan.

Wu has been affiliated with the Industrial Technology Research Institute as head of its Information and Communications Research Laboratories, as well as its vice president, and later, senior vice president.

== Political career ==
At the time of his appointment as leader of the Executive Yuan's National Science and Technology Council on 16 April 2024, Wu was president of the Southern Taiwan University of Science and Technology.

In June 2024, Wu announced the government's proposal to extend the third phase of Taiwan's space development program.

Wu undertook a trip to Silicon Valley in the United States in September 2024. The trip included a visit to Stanford University's Taiwan Science and Technology Hub and Nvidia. In November 2024, Wu referenced in an interview that the Taiwanese government will spend NT$98 billion (about US$3 billion) over three years on artificial intelligence data centers and other upgrades, while working to strengthen cooperation with the United States' incoming Trump administration.

In December 2024, Wu stated that the Taiwanese government was in talks with Amazon about collaborating for the company's Kuiper broadband satellites. According to Wu, bandwidth for the country's existing Eutelsat OneWeb satellite service was too small, and Taiwan had also considered working with other European and Canadian companies. Wu also announced preparations for the "Chip Team Taiwan" initiative, which aimed to promote domestic production of drones, robotics, and other technologies and to reduce reliance on Chinese suppliers.

== Honors and awards ==
Wu was elected a fellow of the Institute of Electrical and Electronics Engineers in 2004.
