= Yongkang District =

District in Tainan, Taiwan

Yongkang 永康區
- District
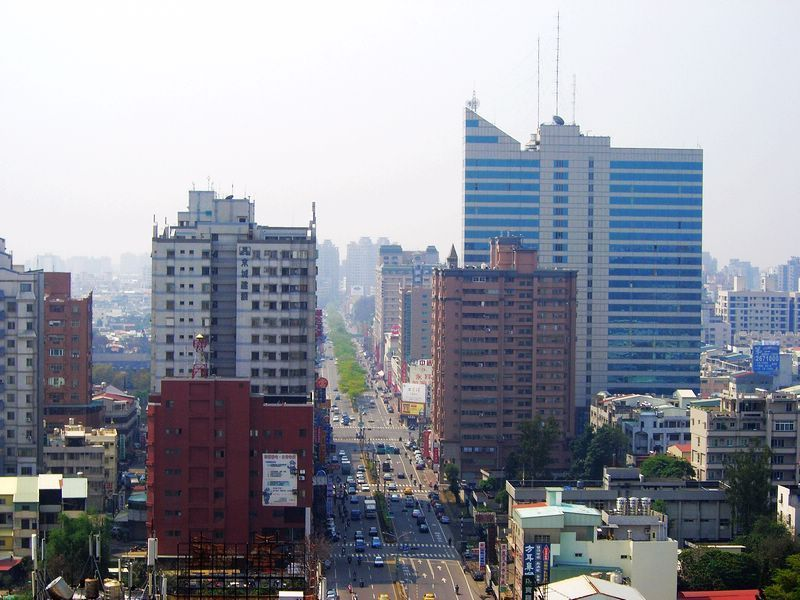

- Yongkang District in Tainan City

- Location within Taiwan
- Coordinates: 23°01′N 120°15′E
- Location: Tainan, Taiwan

Government
  - District Chief: Wang Jyun-ming (王峻明)

Area
  - Total: 40 km^{2} (15 sq mi)

Population (January 2023)
  - Total: 234,351
  - Density: 5,900/km^{2} (15,000/sq mi)
- Website: english.yongkangcity.gov.tw

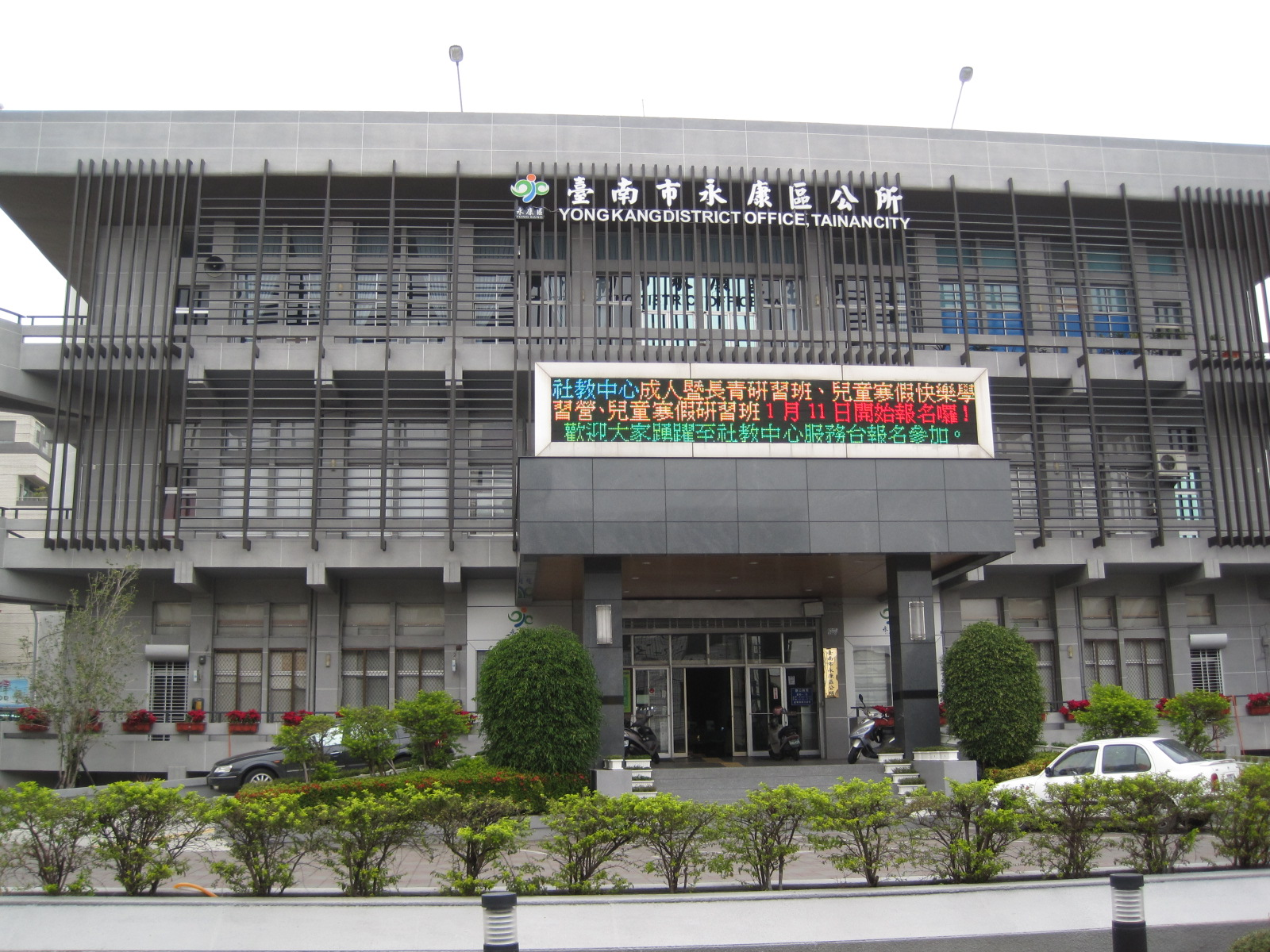
Yongkang District office

Yongkang District (Chinese: 永康區; pinyin: Yǒngkāng Qū; Pe̍h-ōe-jī: Éng-khong Khu) is a district home to 234,351 people in Tainan, Taiwan.

== History ==
Due to the development of manufacturing and food-processing industries, Yongkang has become a migrant city since the 1970s, attracting many people from neighboring cities who now work and live in the city. Its population experienced a large increase during the 1970s, and Yongkang became the largest city in Tainan County in 1977.

On 1 May 1993 Yongkang was upgraded from rural township to a county-administered city since its population exceeded 150,000. Yongkang was formerly the largest city of Tainan County until it merged with Tainan City to form the new Tainan municipality and became Yongkang District on 25 December 2010. Though the increase in population today is not as rapid as it was before, Yongkang still enjoys the steady growth envied by other cities or towns.

== Administrative divisions ==
The district consists of Wuwang, Wangliao, Yongkang, Puyuan, Daqiao, Wanghang, Wuzhu, Niaosong, Sanmin, Yanhang, Jiading, Dawan, Tungwan, Xiwan, Nanwan, Kunshan, Beiwan, Xinshu, Fuxing, Fuguo, Jianguo, Shenzhou, Xishi, Chenggong, Zhongxing, Shengli, Longtan, Guangfu, Yanzhou, Erwang, Liuge, Sange, Tungqiao, Ankang, Xiqiao, Shangding, Fuhua, Zhengjiang, Zhonghua, Beixing, Longpu, Yongming and Yanxing Village.

== Education ==
- Kun Shan University
- Southern Taiwan University of Science and Technology
- Tainan University of Technology

== Tourist attractions ==
- Jiyu Lake
- Taiwan Metal Creation Museum
- Yunshan Orchard

== Transportation ==
=== Rail ===
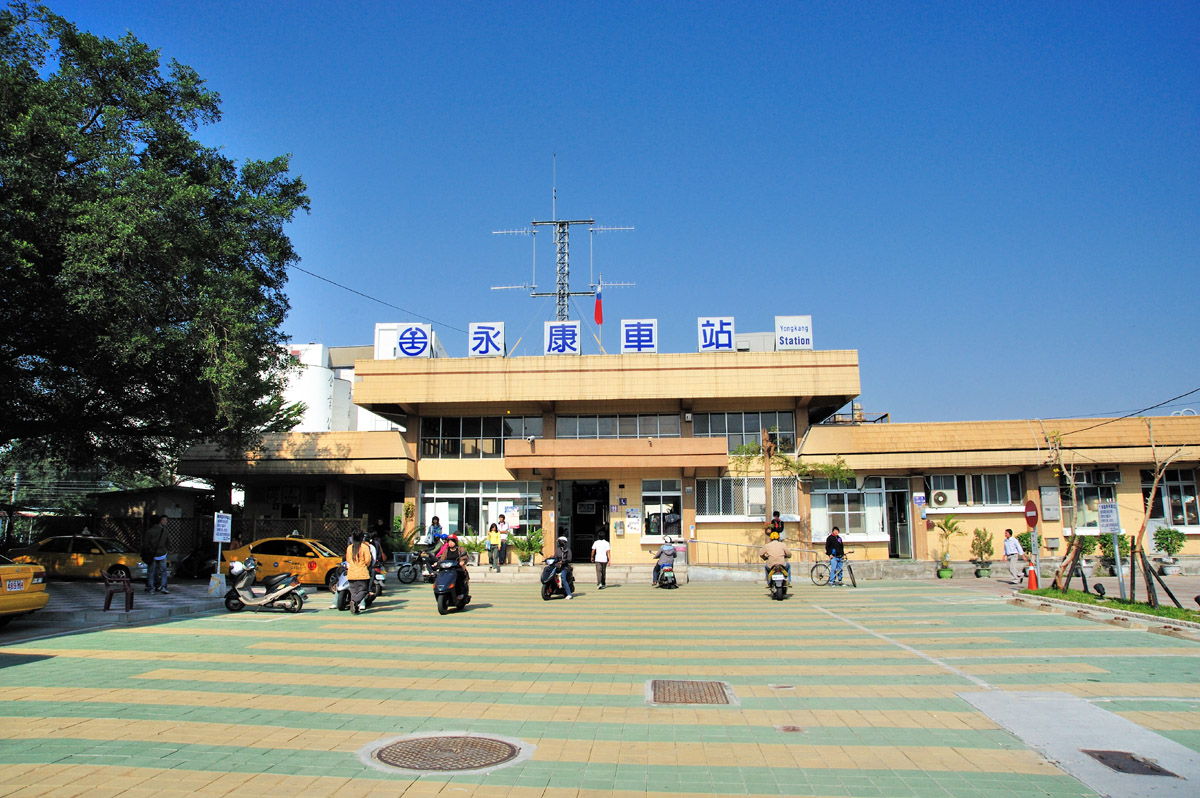
Yongkang Station

- Yongkang Station
- Daqiao Station

=== Road ===
- National Highway 1
- Provincial Highway 1
- Provincial Highway 19
- Provincial Highway 20

== Hospitals ==
- Chi Mei Medical Center
- Kaohsiung Veterans General Hospital Tainan Branch

== Notable natives ==
- Wei Te-sheng, film director and screenwriter
