= Southern Taiwan University of Science and Technology =

University in Tainan, Taiwan

- 南臺科技大學
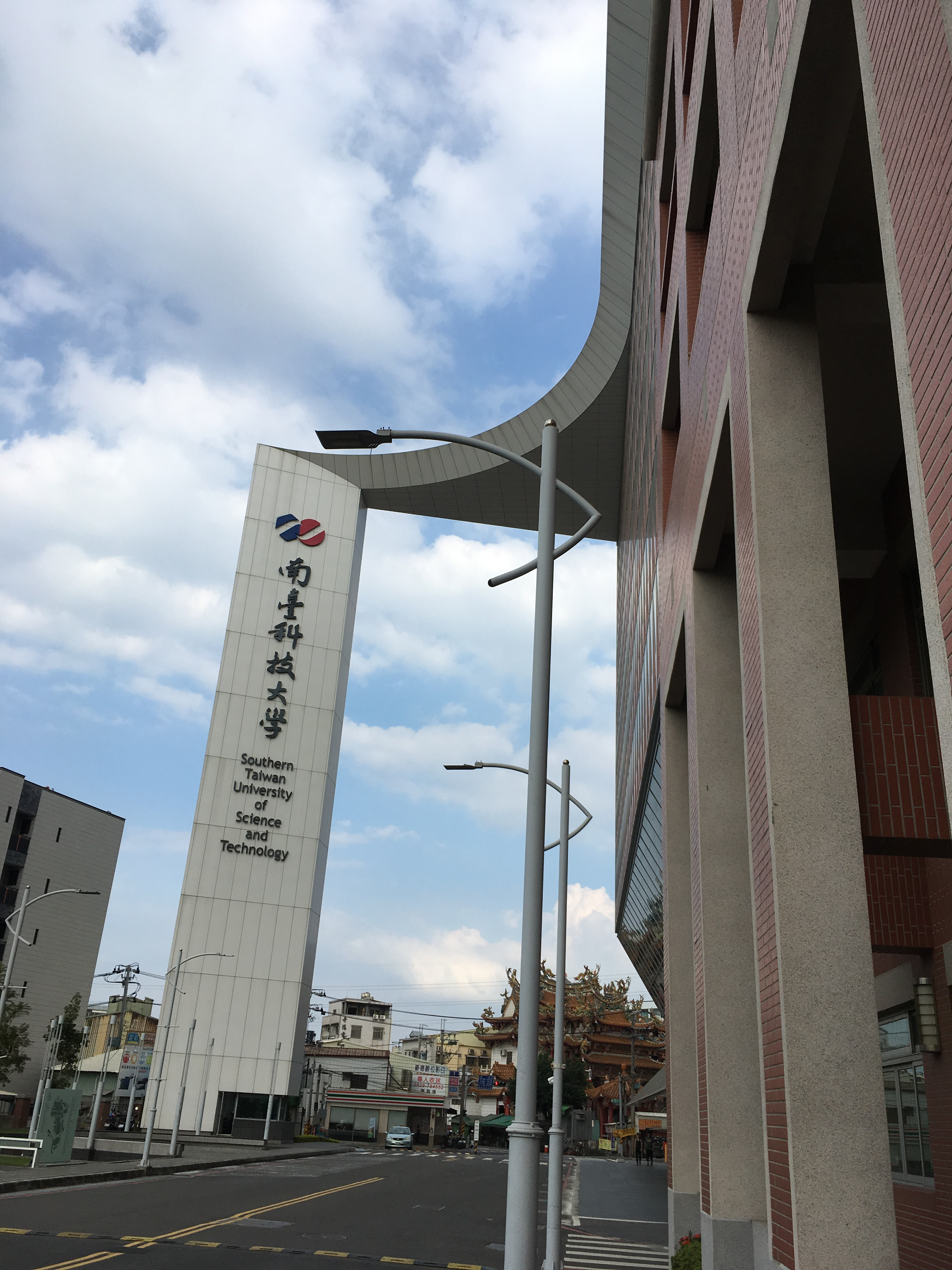
- Motto: Trust, justice, sincerity and honesty
- Type: Private
- Established: 1969
- President: Chou De-kuang (acting)
- Administrative staff: 550
- Students: 18,000
- Location: Yongkang, Tainan, Taiwan
- Website: www.stust.edu.tw

Southern Taiwan University of Science and Technology
- Traditional Chinese: 南臺科技大學
Transcriptions
Standard Mandarin
- Hanyu Pinyin: Nántái Kējì Dàxué
Southern Min
- Hokkien POJ: Lâm-tâi Kho-ki Tāi-ha̍k

Southern Taiwan University of Science and Technology (STUST; Chinese: 南臺科技大學; Pe̍h-ōe-jī: Lâm-tâi Kho-ki Tāi-ha̍k) is a private university in Yongkang District, Tainan, Taiwan.

== History ==
The university was originally founded in 1969 as Nan-Tai Junior College of Engineering. In 1990, it became Nan-Tai Junior College of Engineering and Business. In 1996 it was upgraded to Nan-Tai Institute of Technology and again to Southern Taiwan University of Technology in 1999. In 2007 it was upgraded to Southern Taiwan University and in 2012 it became Southern Taiwan University of Science and Technology.

== Administration ==
=== Chairmen ===
- Wu San-lien (1969–1988)
- Hsin Wen-bing (1988–1999)
- Kao Ching-yuen (1999–2014)
- Cheng Kao-huei (2014–2017)
- Chang Hsin-hsiung (since 2017)

=== Presidents ===
- Hsin Wen-bing (1969–1988)
- Chang Hsin-hsiung (1989–2007)
- Tai Chien (2007–2017)
- Lu Deng-maw (2017–2023)
- Wu Cheng-wen (2023–2024)
- Chou De-kuang (acting; 2024–present)

== Motto ==
The university's motto is Trust, justice, sincerity, honesty.

"Trust, justice, sincerity, and honesty are the basic principles of our lives. They are principles revered by ancient Eastern as well as by ancient Western sages. They are now regarded as our school motto. I hope all of us will strive to fulfill them." —Hsin Wen-bing, 1969

== Faculties ==
- College of Engineering
- College of Business
- College of Humanities and Social Sciences
- College of Digital Design

== Chinese Language Center ==
The Chinese Language Center at STUST was established for international students and visiting foreigners in Taiwan to help them learn Chinese as a foreign language.

Classes are offered depending on the learners' needs. Currently, the center offers beginner and basic classes to assist learners in developing the four essential language skills: speech, listening, writing, and reading.

== Campus ==
- = Buildings
- = Parking Lots
- = Pitches
- = Greenfield
- = Road in campus
- = Road outside campus

=== Buildings ===
Campus Map

1. Electrical Engineering Building I(A)
2. Electrical Engineering Building II(B)
3. Extension Education / Development Building(C)
4. Management & Information Technology Building(D)
5. Shin-Chi Building(E)
6. Information & Communication Building(F)
7. Chemical Engineering & Biotechnology Building(G)
8. Dormitory(H1,H2,H3,H5,H6)
9. Inter-school Alliance Industrial Technology & Practical Training Building(I)
10. Electronic Engineering Building II(J)
11. Mechanical Engineering Building(K)
12. Administration Building(L)
13. Humanities & Art Building(M)
14. Wen-Ping Building(N)
15. Electronic Engineering & Logistic Studies Building(P)
16. Electro-Optical Engineering Building(Q)
17. Automobile Engineering Building(R)
18. Automobile Workshop(R1)
19. Management Science Building(S)
20. Teaching & Research Building(T)
21. Yohas Center(U)
22. Energy Engineering Building(V)
23. Pang-Po Building(W)
24. Design Cube(X)
25. San-lian Gymnasium(Y)
26. Shim-Whai Memorial Hall(Z)
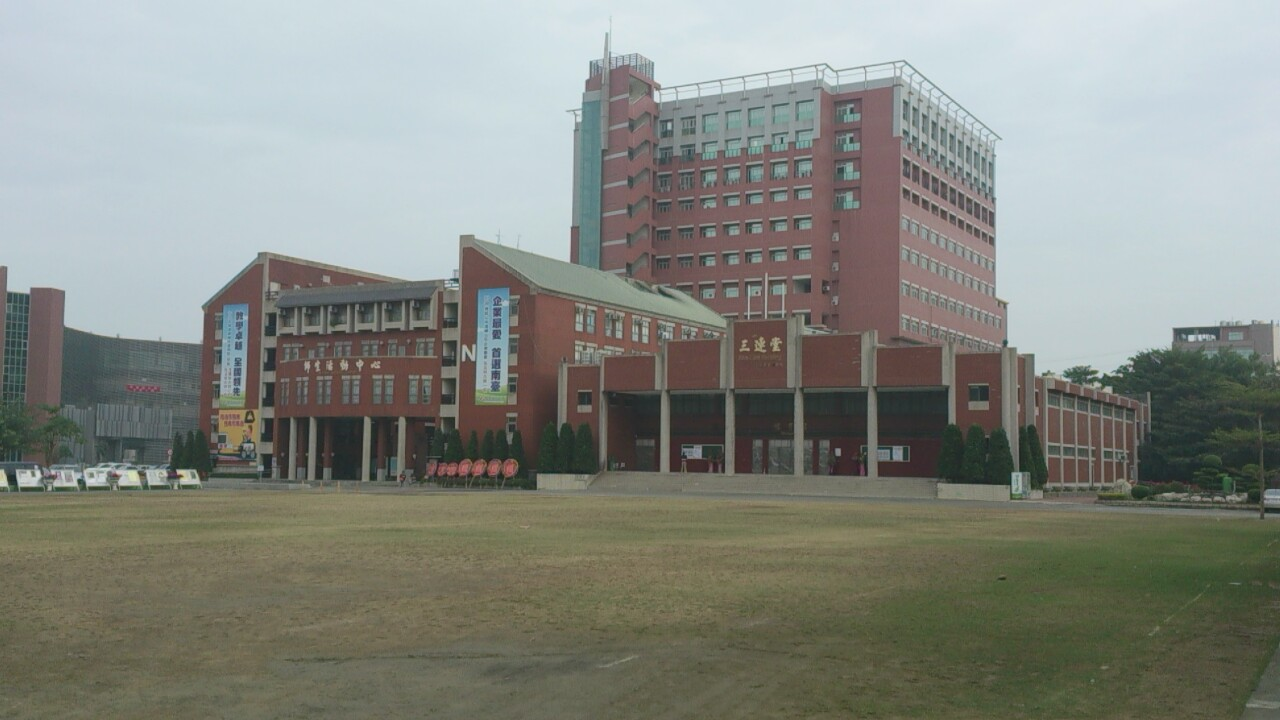
Activity center and San-Lian memorial Gymnasium

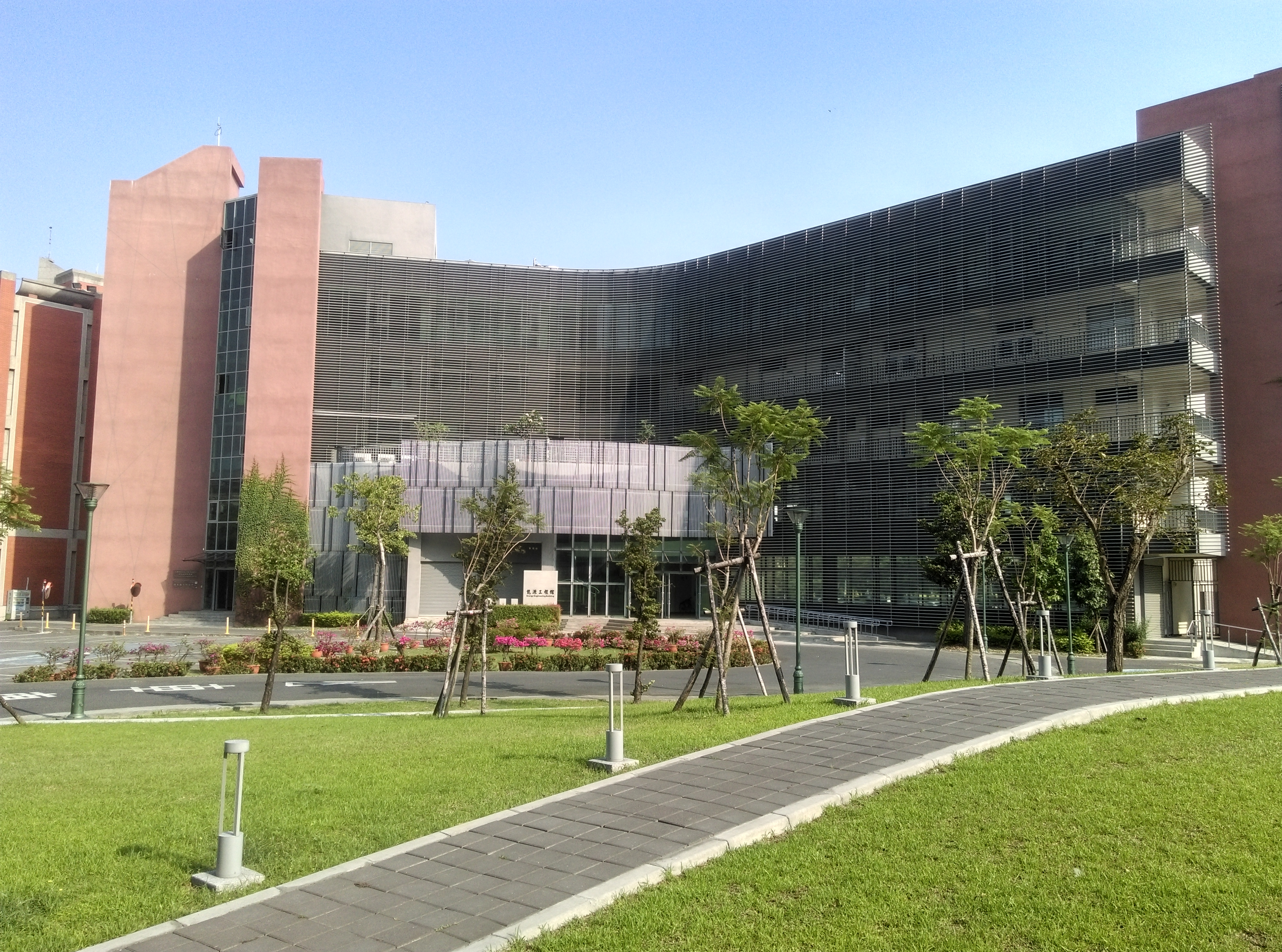
Energy Engineering Building

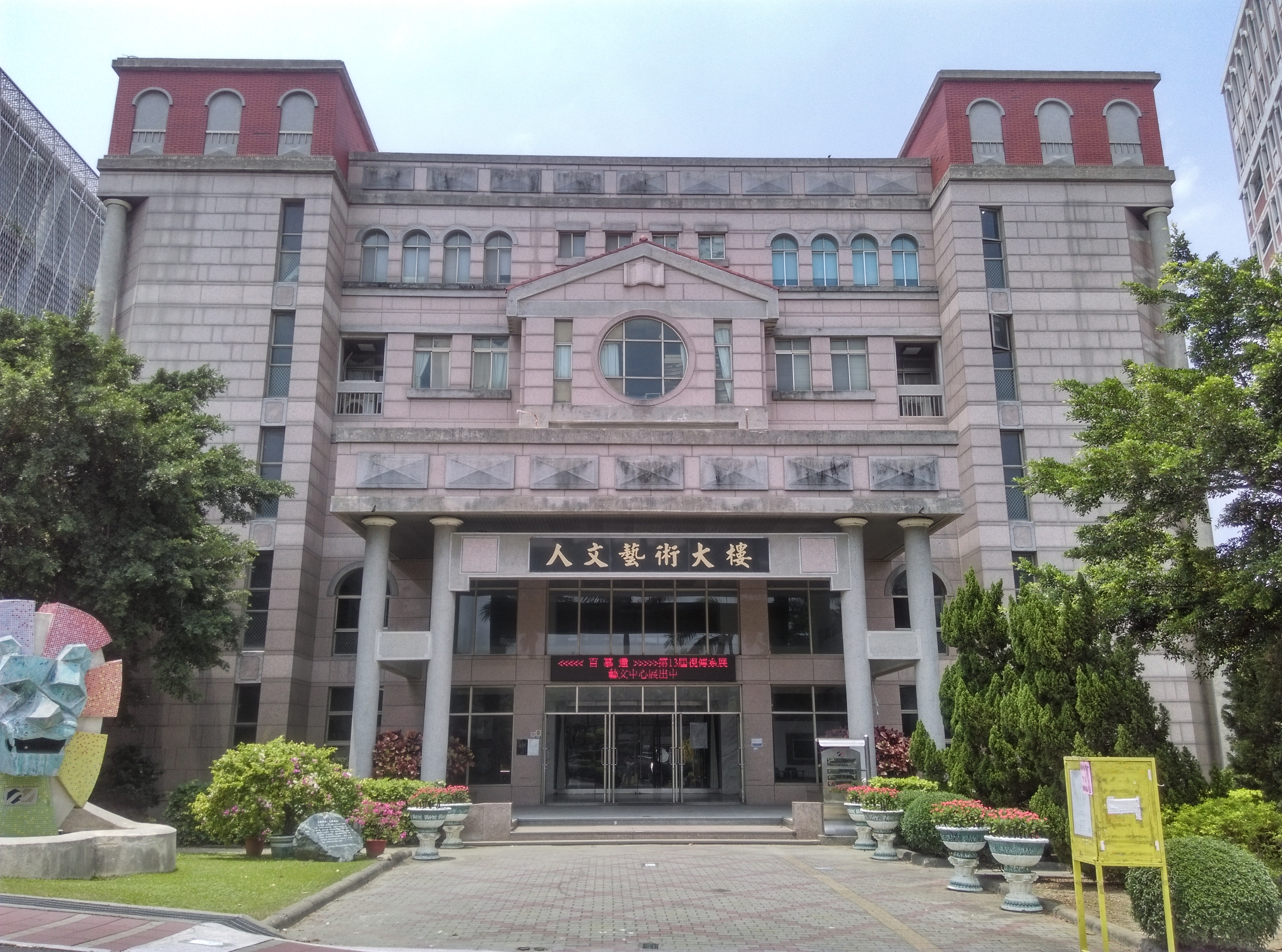
Humanities & Arts Building

== Transportation ==
The university is accessible from Daqiao Station of Taiwan Railway.

== See also ==
- List of universities in Taiwan
