= Wei Che-ho =

Taiwanese politician (born 1946)

Chinese name
- Traditional Chinese: 魏哲和
- Hanyu Pinyin: Wèi Zhéhé
- Hokkien POJ: Gūi Tiat-hô
- Tâi-lô: Guī Tiat-hô

Wei Che-ho (Chinese: 魏哲和; pinyin: Wèi Zhéhé; Pe̍h-ōe-jī: Gūi Tiat-hô; born 28 April 1946) is a Taiwanese engineer who served as minister of the National Science Council from 2001 to 2004.

== Career ==
Wei attended National Chiao Tung University (NCTU) in Taiwan alongside Stan Shih, before earning his doctorate from the University of Washington in the United States. He then began teaching at NCTU in 1976. In 1979, Wei and Lin Jung-sheng cofounded Wang Labs. Wei was later appointed vice president of National Chiao Tung University. Months after the Chen Shui-bian presidential administration took office, Wei was appointed leader of a secondary technology consultation task force in November 2000. On 6 March 2001, Wei succeeded Weng Cheng-yi as minister of the National Science Council (NSC). After taking his position at the NSC, Wei resigned several other positions, including his administrative post at National Chiao Tung University and the government-convened technology task force. Weeks after Wei assumed the NSC post, the Third Nuclear Power Plant in Pingtung was damaged by fire, and Wei led an independent task force to look into the matter. Wei's investigation ruled out electrical system design as a cause of the fire.

Like his predecessor Weng Cheng-yi, Wei struggled to establish the Tainan Science-based Industrial Park, due to noise concerns, as the site was near the proposed route of the Taiwan High Speed Rail. Due to this issue, NSC vice chairman Hsueh Hsiang-chuan resigned, and was replaced by Huang Wen-hsiung. In May 2001, Wei reached an agreement with the University Corporation for Atmospheric Research in the United States regarding ROCSAT-3. In July 2001, amendments to the Animal Protection Law took effect, offering stricter protections for animals used in laboratory research. Wei stated that enforcement of the amended law would improve Taiwan's international image. Wei was retained as National Science Council minister when the Yu Shyi-kun cabinet took office in February 2002.

As minister of the National Science Council, Wei expressed caution about commencing scientific exchanges with China, and supported the passage of laws that codified oversight of Taiwanese technology workers in China. He also sought to acquire land and expand science parks in Taiwan. A May 2003 survey run by the Humanistic Science, Cultural and Educational Foundation ranked Wei the fifth-best government minister. From October 2003 to March 2004, the National Science Council ran a science education radio program called Science 180. After French president Jacques Chirac expressed reservations about the 2004 Taiwanese cross-strait relations referendum, Wei cancelled a scheduled trip to France in January 2004.

Wei's resignation as minister of the National Science Council took effect on 20 May 2004. After leaving public service, Wei returned to National Chiao Tung University as an adjunct professor and served on the board of directors of several companies.
