= Taiwan Metal Creation Museum =

Museum in Yongkang, Tainan, Taiwan

- 台灣金屬創意館
- Established: 2013
- Location: Yongkang, Tainan, Taiwan
- Coordinates: 24°54′26″N 121°08′59″E
- Type: museum

The Taiwan Metal Creation Museum (TMCM; traditional Chinese: 台灣金屬創意館; simplified Chinese: 台湾金属创意馆; pinyin: Táiwān Jīnshǔ Chuàngyì Guǎn) is a sheet metal tourism factory museum in Yongkang District, Tainan, Taiwan.

== History ==
The museum was founded in 2013 by Chih Kang Material Co., Ltd.

== Architecture ==
The museum is divided into several thematic areas, which are culture and creation, education, experience, legacy and tourism.

== Transportation ==
The museum is accessible north east from Yongkang Station of Taiwan Railway.

== See also ==
- List of museums in Taiwan
