= Shyu Jyuo-min =

Taiwanese engineer

- 徐爵民

Minister of Science and Technology
- In office 23 January 2015 – 20 May 2016
- Preceded by: Chang San-cheng; Lin Yi-bing (acting)
- Succeeded by: Yang Hung-duen

Personal details
- Born: February 22, 1954 (age 72)
- Education: National Taiwan University (BS, MS); University of California, Berkeley (PhD)
- Scientific career
- Fields: Electrical engineering
- Thesis: Performance Optimization of Integrated Circuits (1988)
- Doctoral advisor: Alberto Sangiovanni-Vincentelli

Shyu Jyuo-min (Chinese: 徐爵民; pinyin: Xú Juémín; born February 22, 1954) is a Taiwanese electrical engineer and academic. He was the Minister of Science and Technology from 23 January 2015 until 20 May 2016.

== Education ==
Shyu graduated from National Taiwan University with a bachelor's degree and a master's degree in electrical engineering in 1977 and 1979, respectively. He then pursued doctoral studies in the United States, where he earned his Ph.D. in electrical engineering from the University of California, Berkeley, in 1988. His doctoral dissertation, completed under computer scientist Alberto Sangiovanni-Vincentelli, was titled, "Performance Optimization of Integrated Circuits".

== Early career ==
In 1981–1984, Shyu worked as a researcher at Matsushita Electric Industrial Co., Ltd. In 2000–2001, he became the director-general of the SoC Technology Center of Industrial Technology Research Institute (ITRI) and as director-general of Electronics Research and Service Organization of ITRI in 2000–2004. In 2003–2007, he became the executive vice president of ITRI. In 2007–2010, he was the dean of the College of Electrical Engineering and Computer Sciences of National Tsing Hua University and in 2009-2010 as the vice chancellor of University System of Taiwan.

== Minister of Science and Technology ==
=== Ministry appointment ===
On 23 January 2015, the Executive Yuan appointed Shyu to be the Minister of Science and Technology, replacing former Minister Chang San-cheng.
