= Tainan University of Technology =

University in Tainan, Taiwan

Coordinates: 23°02′20.1″N 120°14′21.4″E

- 台南應用科技大學
- Motto: Combine learning with thought.
- Type: Private
- Established: 1965
- Location: Yongkang, Tainan, Taiwan
- Campus: Urban
- Colors: Purple and White
- Nickname: Phoenix (symbol)
- Website: www.tut.edu.tw

Tainan University of Technology
- Traditional Chinese: 台南應用科技大學
Transcriptions
Standard Mandarin
- Hanyu Pinyin: Táinán Yìngyòng Kējì Dàxué
Southern Min
- Hokkien POJ: Tâi-lâm Èng-iōng Kho-ki Tāi-ha̍k

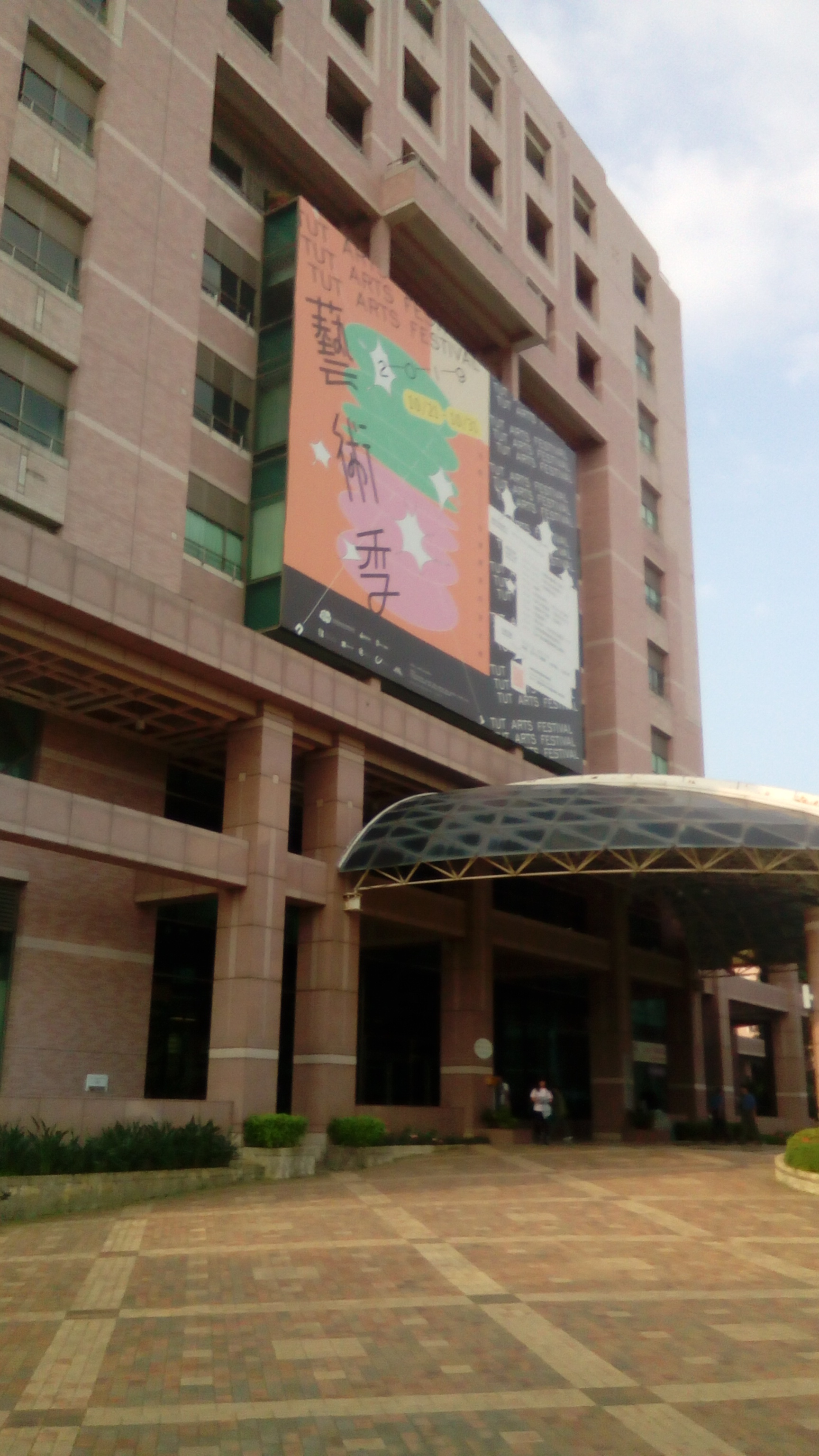
Tainan University of Technology

The Tainan University of Technology (TUT; Chinese: 台南應用科技大學; Pe̍h-ōe-jī: Tâi-lâm Èng-iōng Kho-ki Tāi-ha̍k), also known as Tainan Tech (台南科大; Pe̍h-ōe-jī: Tâi-lâm Kho-tāi; pinyin: Táinán Kēdà), is a private university serving approximately 10,000 students in the Tainan metropolitan area in southern Taiwan. The main campus sits in Yongkang District of Tainan.

== History ==
The school, founded in 1964 to provide professional training for women, opened its doors in 1965 as the Private Tainan Junior College of Home Economics. The school subsequently became the Tainan Women's College of Arts and Technology (1997–2006). As the Tainan University of Technology (2007) it graduated its first male students.

Tainan Tech is historically strong in the fields of music, visual art, arts technology, education, finance, product design and fashion design. Since 2002 the school has added graduate programs in music, business management, art and applied sciences.

The campus is famed for its international horticulture and outdoor art. The landscaping facilitates a commencement ritual: a circumnavigation of the campus by graduates, who process through a series of floral trellises and, finally, under a line of decorated arches held aloft by younger classmates.

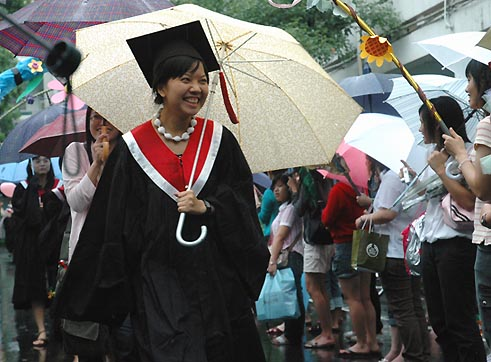
Tainan Tech commencement

== Faculties ==
- College of Arts
- College of Design
- College of Living Technology
- College of Management
- College of Tourism

== See also ==
- List of universities in Taiwan
