= Louis Lee =

Taiwanese astrophysicist, mathematician, and astronomer

Lee Lou-chuang
- 李羅權
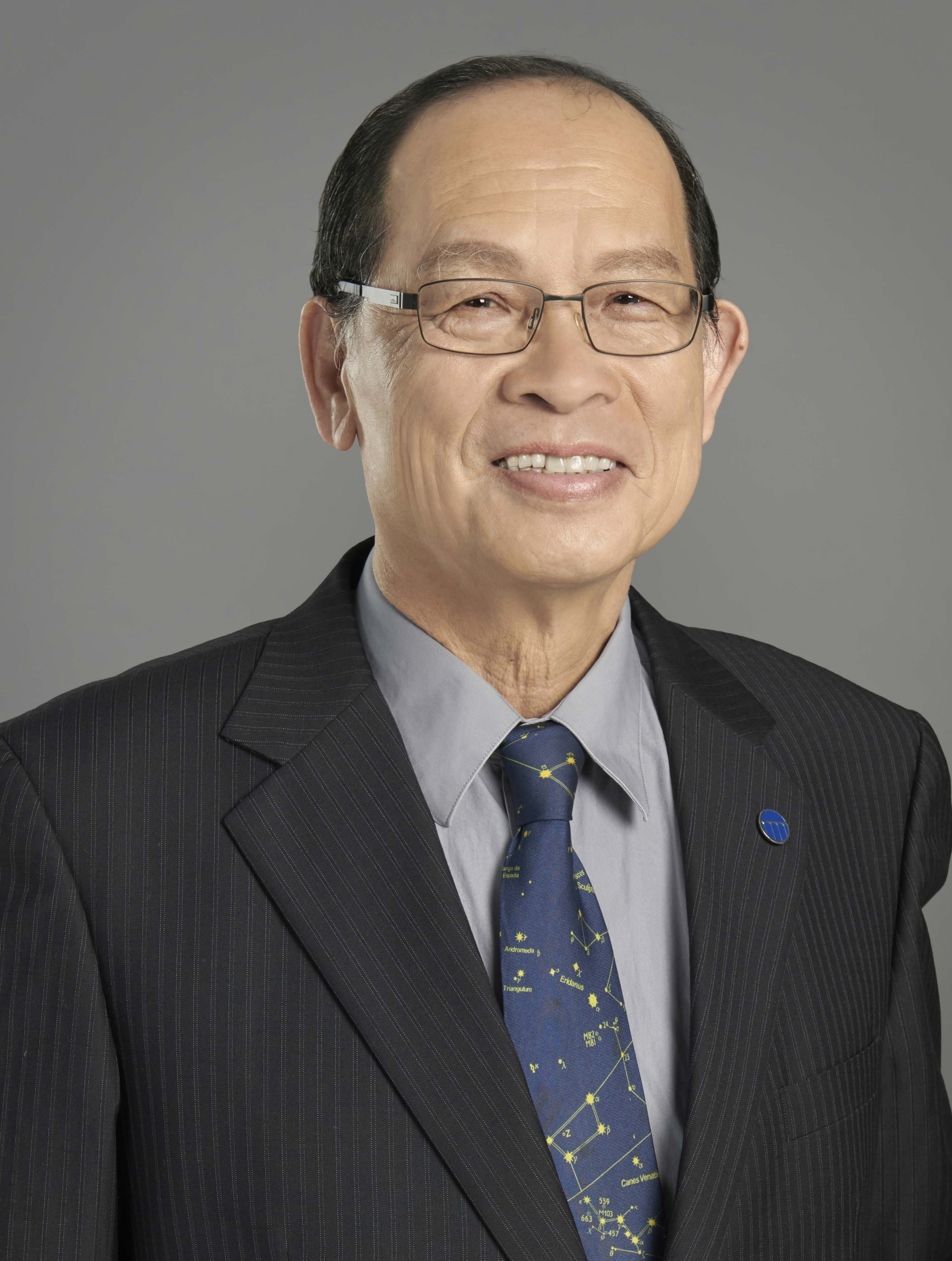

Minister of National Science Council
- In office 20 May 2008 – 5 February 2011
- Preceded by: Chen Chien-jen
- Succeeded by: Cyrus Chu

Personal details
- Born: 20 April 1947 (age 79) Tianwei, Changhua, Taiwan
- Education: National Taiwan University (BS); California Institute of Technology (MS, PhD)
- Scientific career
- Fields: Astrophysics
- Thesis: A Theory of Strong and Weak Scintillations with Applications to Astrophysics (1975)
- Doctoral advisor: J. Randolph Jokipii, Jon Mathews, and Gerald B. Whitham

Lee Lou-chuang (Chinese: 李羅權; born 20 April 1947), also known by his English name Louis Lee, is a Taiwanese astrophysicist, mathematician, and astronomer.

== Early life and education ==
Lee was born in Tianwei, Changhua, on April 20, 1947. After high school, he graduated from National Taiwan University with a Bachelor of Science (B.S.) in physics in 1969, then completed graduate studies in the United States at the California Institute of Technology, where he earned his Master of Science (M.S.) in 1972 in physics and his Ph.D. in physics, mathematics, and astronomy in 1975. His doctoral dissertation was titled, "A Theory of Strong and Weak Scintillations with Applications to Astrophysics," and was completed under professors J. Randolph Jokipii, Jon Mathews, and Gerald B. Whitham on a fellowship awarded by IBM and a grant by the National Science Foundation.

== Academic career ==
After receiving his doctorate, Lee worked at the Goddard Space Flight Center and taught at the University of Maryland before joining the University of Alaska faculty.

Lee returned to Taiwan and began teaching at National Cheng Kung University in 1995. He has served as the director of the National Applied Research Laboratories and the National Space Program Office (NSPO). As leader of the NSPO, Lee presided over the launch of the satellite ROCSAT-2 and the development of ROCSAT-3. Lee also helped conduct research on thunderclouds and the ionosphere.

Lee later became president of National Central University and was named minister of the National Science Council in April 2008. Lee was replaced by Cyrus Chu in February 2011.

== Honors ==
Lee was elected a member of Academia Sinica in 2002, and a foreign member of the United States National Academy of Engineering in 2018.
