= Information Sciences (journal) =

- Discipline: Information science
- Language: English
- Edited by: Witold Pedrycz

Publication details
- History: 1968–present
- Publisher: Elsevier (United States)
- Frequency: Bimonthly
- Impact factor: 8.233 (2021)

Standard abbreviations
- ISO 4: Inf. Sci.
- MathSciNet: Inform. Sci.

Indexing
- CODEN: ISIJBC
- ISSN: 0020-0255 (print); 1872-6291 (web)
- LCCN: 70005412
- OCLC no.: 898000956

Links
- Journal homepage; Online archive

Information Sciences is a bimonthly peer-reviewed academic journal covering information science. It was established in 1968 and is published by Elsevier. The editor-in-chief is Witold Pedrycz (University of Alberta). According to the Journal Citation Reports, the journal has a 2021 impact factor of 8.233.
