= Wolfgang Sachse =

German-born American mechanical engineer (born 1942)

Wolfgang Sachse (born 22 March 1942) is a German-born American mechanical engineer.

Sachse is a native of Berlin. He earned a Bachelor of Science degree in physics from Pennsylvania State University, followed by a master's of science in engineering and a doctorate at Johns Hopkins University in 1970, advised by Robert E. Green. He then pursued postdoctoral research as a Humboldt Fellow at RWTH Aachen University. Sachse subsequently joined the Cornell University faculty, where he was later named Meinig Family Professor of Engineering.

Sachse began serving as a member of the international advisory board for the academic journal Ultrasonics from the January 1988 issue through at least the February 1998 issue. He succeeded Moshe Rosen as chief editor of the journal in 1999, and stepped down from the position in 2014.
