= Kao Ying-jer =

Taiwanese physicist

Kao Ying-jer (Chinese: 高英哲) is a Taiwanese physicist.

Kao earned a PhD from the University of Chicago in 2001 and conducted postdoctoral research at the University of Waterloo and the University of Toronto before joining the faculty of National Taiwan University in 2005 as an assistant professor. He was promoted to associate professor in 2009 and full professor in 2013. He previously served as chair of the Taiwan Physical Society.

Kao was elected a fellow of the American Physical Society in 2025 “[f]or contributions to numerical methods to study emergent phenomena in quantum many-body systems, while tirelessly promoting experimental and theoretical sciences within Asia and developing stronger ties with the U.S.
