= Wireless Personal Communications =

- Discipline: Engineering
- Language: English
- Edited by: Ramjee Prasad

Publication details
- History: 1994-present
- Publisher: Springer Science+Business Media
- Frequency: Biweekly
- Impact factor: 1.20 (2017)

Standard abbreviations
- ISO 4: Wirel. Pers. Commun.

Indexing
- ISSN: 0929-6212 (print); 1572-834X (web)
- OCLC no.: 38267297

Links
- Journal homepage; Online archive

Wireless Personal Communications is a peer-reviewed scientific journal published by Springer Science+Business Media. It covers mobile communications and computing and investigates theoretical, engineering, and experimental aspects of radio communications, voice, data, images, and multimedia. This includes propagation, system models, speech and image coding, multiple access techniques, protocols performance evaluation, radio local area networks, and networking and architectures. The editor-in-chief is Ramjee Prasad (Aalborg University).

== Abstracting and indexing ==
The journal is abstracted and indexed in the Science Citation Index Expanded and Scopus. According to the Journal Citation Reports, the journal has a 2020 impact factor of 1.671.
