= National Science and Technology Council (Taiwan) =

Statutory agency of the Republic of China

Coordinates: 25.0247°N 121.5422°E

- 國家科學及技術委員會
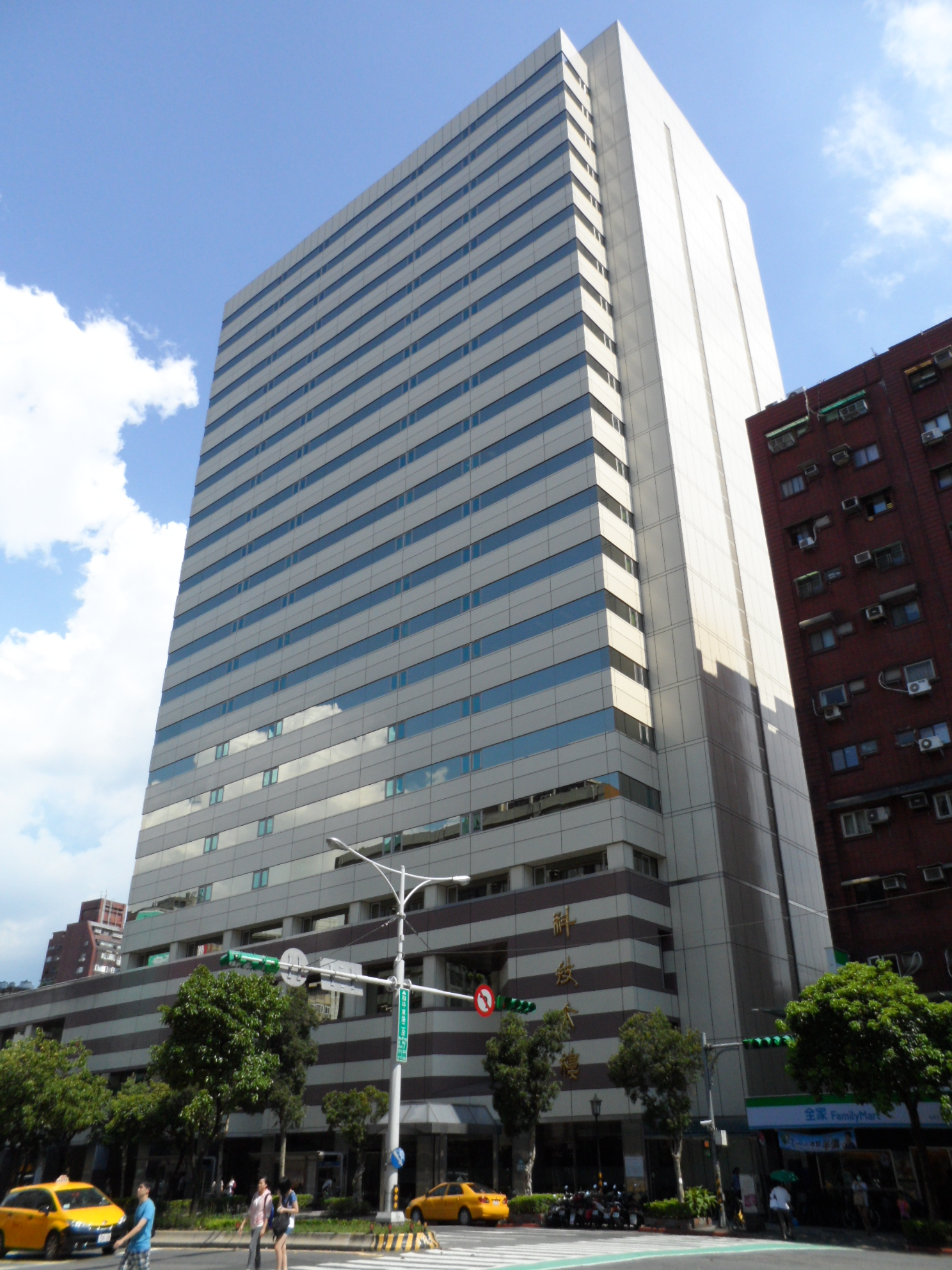
- Technology Building

Agency overview
- Formed: 1 February 1959 (as NSC); 3 February 2014 (as MOST); 26 July 2022 (as NSTC)
- Preceding agencies: National Council on Science Development; Ministry of Science and Technology
- Jurisdiction: Taiwan (Republic of China)
- Headquarters: Da'an, Taipei
- Agency executives: Wu Cheng-wen, Minister; Lin Minn-tsong, Deputy Minister
- Parent agency: Executive Yuan
- Website: www.nstc.gov.tw

The National Science and Technology Council (NSTC; 國家科學及技術委員會) is a statutory agency of Executive Yuan of the Republic of China (Taiwan) for the promotion and funding of academic research, development of science and technology and science parks. NSTC is a member of Belmont Forum.

== History ==
The NSTC was originally established as the National Council on Science Development on 1 February 1959.

In 1967, it was renamed to National Science Council (NSC; Chinese: 國家科學委員會; pinyin: Guójiā Kēxué Wěiyuánhuì; Pe̍h-ōe-jī: Kok-ka Kho-ha̍k Úi-oân-hōe).

The NSC became the Ministry of Science and Technology on 3 February 2014.

Pursuant to the Act for Adjustment of Functions and Organizations of the Executive Yuan, as proposed by the Executive Yuan in March 2021, and approved by the Legislative Yuan in December 2021, the Ministry of Science and Technology was reorganized as a ministry-level council named National Science and Technology Council starting 26 July 2022.

== Organizational structure ==
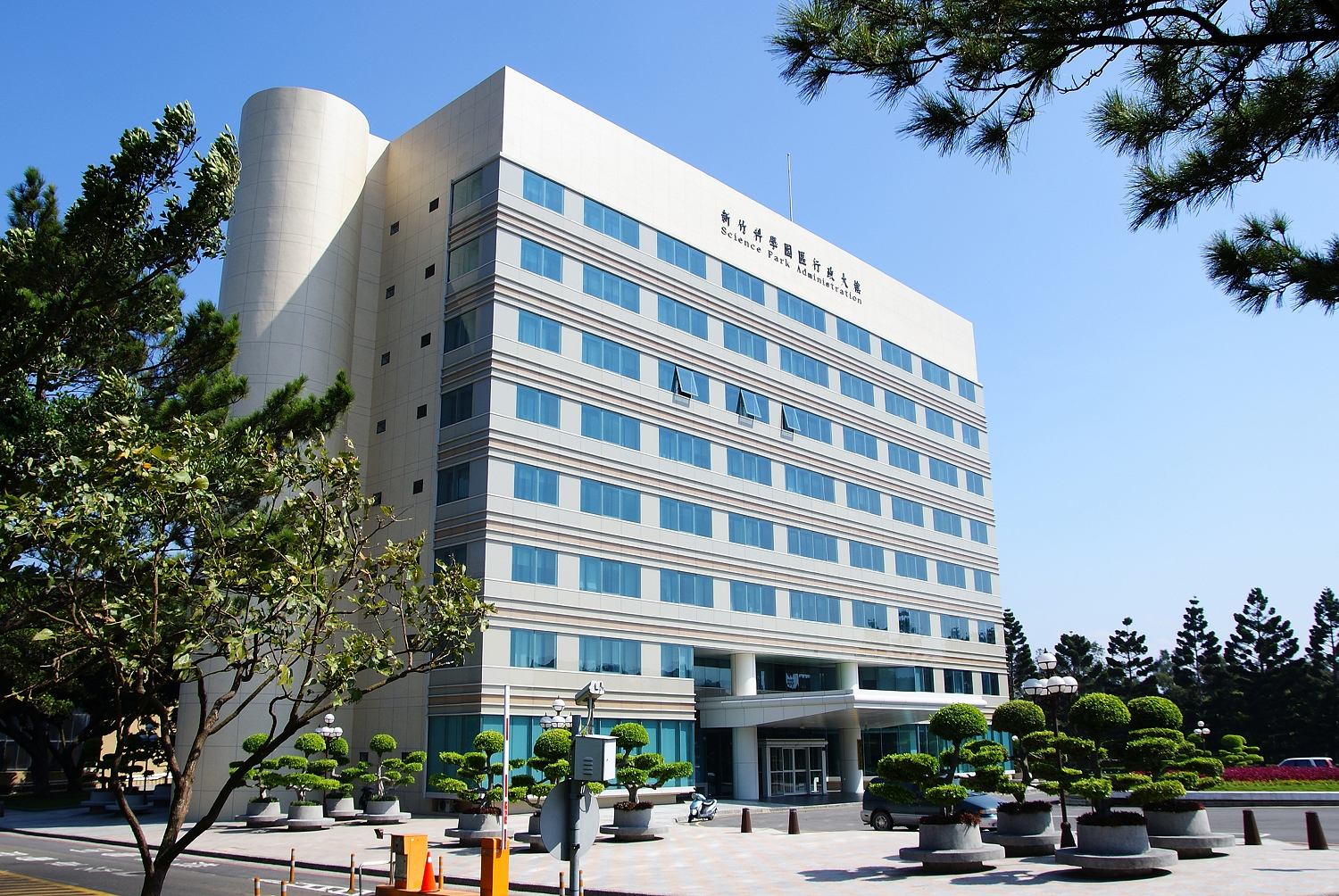
Hsinchu Science Park Bureau

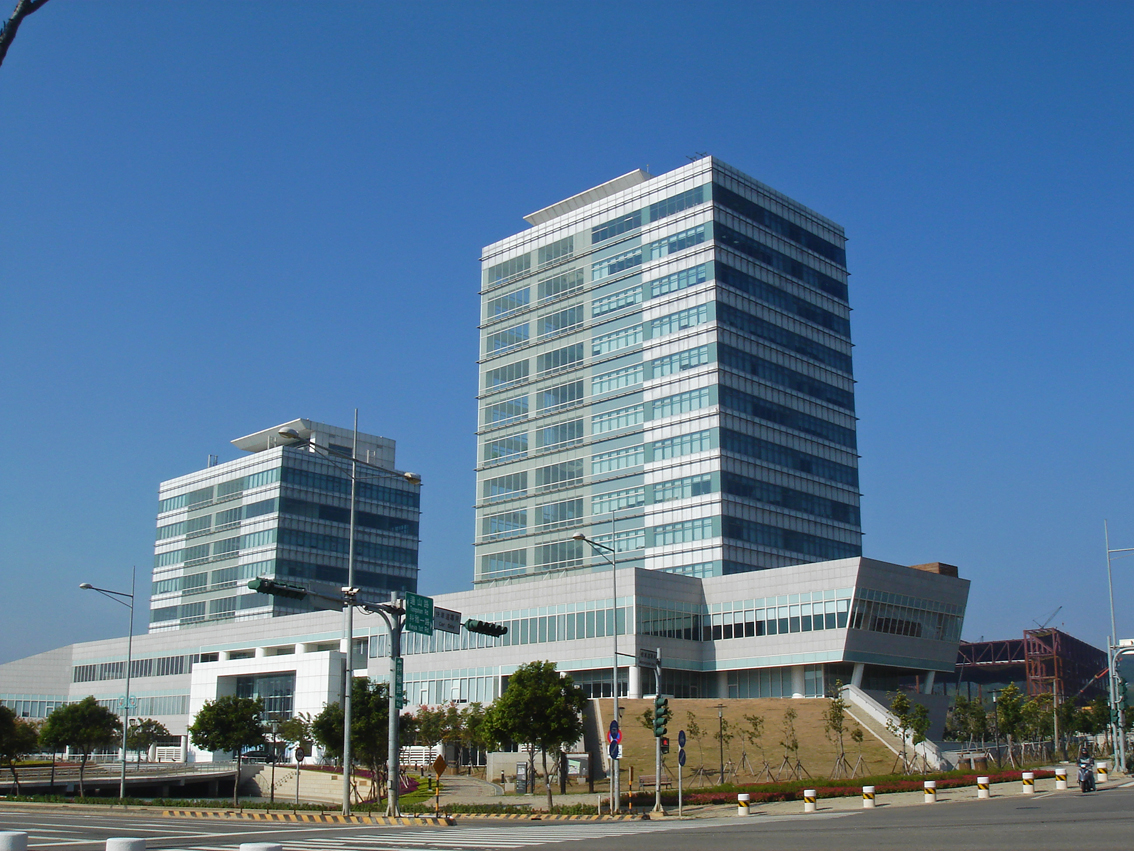
Central Taiwan Science Park Bureau

=== Departments ===
- Department of Planning
- Department of Natural Sciences and Sustainable Development
- Department of Engineering and Technologies
- Department of Life Sciences
- Department of Humanities and Social Sciences
- Department of International Cooperation and Science Educations
- Department of Foresight and Innovation Policies
- Department of Academia-Industry Collaboration and Science Park Affairs

=== Offices ===
- Department of General Affairs
- Department of Personnel
- Department of Budget, Accounting and Statistics
- Department of Government Ethics
- Department of Information Services
- Legal Affairs Committee (Petitions and Appeals Committee)
- Office of Congressional Relations

=== Bureau and agencies ===
- Hsinchu Science Park Bureau
- Central Taiwan Science Park Bureau
- Southern Taiwan Science Park Bureau
- National Science and Technology Center for Disaster Reduction
- National Applied Research Laboratories
- National Synchrotron Radiation Research Center
- Taiwan Space Agency

=== Schools ===
- National Experimental High School At Hsinchu Science Park
- National Experimental High School At Central Taiwan Science Park
- National Nanke International Experimental High School
- National Experimental High School At Chiayi Science Park
- National Experimental High School At Pingtung Science Park
- National Experimental High School At Kaohsiung Science Park

== List of ministers ==
Political party: Kuomintang Non-partisan/ unknown Democratic Progressive Party

No.	Name	Term of office		Days	Party	Cabinet
Minister of the National Council on Science Development
1	Hu Shih (胡適)	1 February 1959	February 1962		Independent	Chen Cheng II
2	Wang Shijie (王世杰)	May 1962	August 1967			Chen Cheng II; Yen Chia-kan
Minister of the National Science Council
1	Wu Ta-You (吳大猷)	August 1967	June 1973			Yen Chia-kan; Chiang Ching-kuo
2	Shu Shien-Siu (徐賢修)	June 1973	March 1981			Chiang Ching-kuo; Sun Yun-suan
3	Chang Ming-che (張明哲)	March 1981	31 May 1984			Sun Yun-suan
4	Chen Li-an (陳履安)	1 June 1984	21 July 1988	1511	Kuomintang	Sun Yun-suan; Yu Kuo-hua
5	Hsia Han-ming (夏漢民)	22 July 1988	26 February 1993	1680		Yu Kuo-hua; Lee Huan; Hau Pei-tsun; Lien Chan
6	Guo Nan-hung (郭南宏)	27 February 1993	10 June 1996	1199		Lien Chan
7	Liu Chao-shiuan (劉兆玄)	10 June 1996	4 February 1998	604	Kuomintang	Lien Chan; Vincent Siew
8	Huang Chen-tai (黃鎮台)	5 February 1998	19 May 2000	834	Kuomintang	Vincent Siew
9	Weng Cheng-yi (翁政義)	20 May 2000	6 March 2001	291		Tang Fei; Chang Chun-hsiung I
10	Wei Che-ho (魏哲和)	7 March 2001	19 May 2004	1169		Chang Chun-hsiung I Yu Shyi-kun
11	Maw-Kuen Wu (吳茂昆)	20 May 2004	24 January 2006	614		Yu Shyi-kun; Frank Hsieh
12	Chen Chien-jen (陳建仁)	25 January 2006	19 May 2008	845	Independent	Su Tseng-chang I Chang Chun-hsiung II
13	Louis Lee (李羅權)	20 May 2008	5 February 2011	991		Liu Chao-shiuan; Wu Den-yih
14	Cyrus Chu (朱敬一)	6 February 2011	2 March 2014	1120		Wu Den-yih; Sean Chen; Jiang Yi-huah
Minister of Science and Technology (since 3 March 2014)
1	Chang San-cheng (張善政)	3 March 2014	8 December 2014	280	Independent	Jiang Yi-huah
—	Lin Yi-bing (林一平)	8 December 2014	23 January 2015	46		Mao Chi-kuo
2	Shyu Jyuo-min (徐爵民)	24 January 2015	19 May 2016	481		Mao Chi-kuo; Chang San-cheng
3	Yang Hung-duen (楊弘敦)	20 May 2016	7 February 2017	263		Lin Chuan
4	Chen Liang-gee (陳良基)	8 February 2017	20 May 2020	1197		Lin Chuan; William Lai; Su Tseng-chang II
5	Wu Tsung-tsong (吳政忠)	20 May 2020	26 July 2022	797		Su Tseng-chang II
Minister of the National Science and Technology Council (since 26 July 2022)
1	Wu Tsung-tsong (吳政忠)	26 July 2022	20 May 2024	664		Su Tseng-chang II; Chen Chien-jen
2	Wu Cheng-wen (吳誠文)	20 May 2024	Incumbent	811		Cho Jung-tai

== Budget ==
The 2014 budget for NSTC is NT$44.043 billion, in which 79.6% is dedicated for support for academic research, 12.5% for promotion of national science and technology development and 7.9% for development of science parks.

== Transportation ==
The NSTC building is accessible within walking distance South West from Technology Building Station of the Taipei Metro.

== Previous logos ==
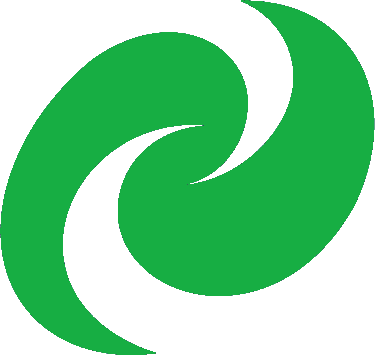
Logo of National Science Council (Before 2 March 2014)

Logo of Ministry of Science and Technology (Between 3 March 2014 and 6 November 2017)

Logo of Ministry of Science and Technology (Between 7 November 2017 and 26 July 2022)

== See also ==
- Tsinghua Big Five Alliance
- Executive Yuan
- Taiwan Ocean Research Institute
- Economy of Taiwan#Science
