= List of Taiwanese scientists =

This is a list of Taiwanese scientists sorted in alphabetical order by surname.

== Astronomers ==
- Liu Caipin
- Hsiao-Wen Chen
- Wing-Huen Ip
- Kao Ping-tse
- Typhoon Lee
- Ma Chung-pei
- Shen Chun-shan

== Atmospheric scientists, meteorologists ==
- Yuei-An Liou, atmospheric scientist
- Liu Shaw-chen
- Jen Li-yu, meteorologist
- Kuo-Nan Liou, meteorologist
- Pao K. Wang, meteorologist
- Peng Chi-ming

== Biologists ==
- Nancy T. Chang, biochemist
- Tse Wen Chang, biotechnologist and immunologist
- Yuan Chang, pathologist and virologist
- Chen Lan-bo, biotechnologist
- Chen Wen-yu, horticulturist
- Yuan-Tsong Chen, geneticist
- Cheng Soo-chen, biochemist
- Chiang Ann-shyn, neuroscientist
- Chou Chang-hung, botanist
- Louise Chow, biochemist
- De-Maw Chuang, neuroscientist
- Cheng-Ming Chuong, molecular biologist, ornithologist and pathologist
- Ying-Hui Fu, molecular biologist and biochemist
- Ya-Chi Ho, virologist
- Hsu Su-ming, pathologist
- Pien-Chien Huang, molecular biologist
- Ru-Chih Chow Huang, biochemist
- Daisy L. Hung, neuroscientist
- Mien-Chie Hung, molecular biologist
- Lily Jan, neuroscientist
- Kao Cheng-yan, bioinformatician
- George Kuo, virologist
- Michael M. C. Lai, virologist
- Yuan-Chuan Lee, biochemist
- Lee Chin-lung, horticulturist
- Eva Y.-H. P. Lee, molecular biologist
- Lee Ming-liang, geneticist
- Lee Sung-yang, entomologist
- Wen-Hwa Lee, molecular biologist
- Wen-Hsiung Li, molecular evolutionist
- Edgar Lin, biologist and ecologist
- Leroy Liu, molecular biologist
- Lo Tung-bin, biochemist
- Horace Loh, biochemist
- Shang Fa Yang, botanist
- Chiaho Shih, immunologist and virologist
- Jean Chen Shih, biochemist
- Shin-Ru Shih, virologist
- Tang K. Tang, geneticist and molecular biologist
- Tang Shui Liu, botanist
- Teng Huo-tu, ichthyologist
- Ming-Jer Tsai, cell biologist
- George Tseng, bioinformatician
- Andrew H. J. Wang, biochemist
- Wang Chang-yi, immunologist
- Kuan Wang, biochemist
- Teresa Wang, pathologist
- Chi-Huey Wong, biochemist
- Wu Cheng-wen (biochemist), biochemist
- Chung-I Wu, biologist
- Denise Hsien Wu, neuroscientist
- Yu Su-may, phytopathologist

== Chemists ==
- George Chang, chemical engineer
- Yet-Ming Chiang, material scientist
- Chung-Hsuan Winston Chen, chemist
- Chen Wen-chang, chemical engineer
- Chen Yu-chie, chemist
- Hai-Lung Dai, chemist
- Benjamin Hsiao, chemist and chemical engineer
- Wei-Shou Hu, chemical engineer
- Bor-ming Jahn, geochemist
- Typhoon Lee, geochemist
- Yuan T. Lee, chemist
- Yuan-Pern Lee, chemist
- James C. Liao, chemical engineer
- Lin Ming-chang, chemist
- Ming-Fa Lin, material scientist
- Yu-Shan Lin, chemist
- Kopin Liu, chemist
- Mao Kao-wen, chemical engineer
- Mou Chung-yuan, chemist
- Ding Yu Peng, chemical engineer
- Shie-Ming Peng, chemist
- Shen-su Sun, geochemist
- Alice Y. Ting, chemist
- Peter Tsai, material scientist
- Wang Chung-yu, chemical engineer
- Frederick E. Wang, chemist
- Ying-Nan Chiu, chemist

=== Pharmacologists ===
- Chang Chuan-chiung
- Chen-Yuan Lee

== Computer scientist ==
- Shaowen Bardzell
- Shi-Kuo Chang
- Shih-Fu Chang
- Hsinchun Chen
- Chen Tze-chiang
- Chen Wen-tsuen
- Ed Chi
- Chu Bong-Foo
- Aja Huang
- Mei-Yuh Hwang
- Kao Cheng-yan
- H. T. Kung
- Der-Tsai Lee
- Lin-Shan Lee
- R. C. T. Lee
- Mark Liao
- Chih-Jen Lin
- Ming C. Lin
- Lin Yi-bing
- Chung Laung Liu
- Wei-Ying Ma
- Ai-Chun Pang
- Mei-Ling Shyu
- S.Y.H. Su
- Audrey Tang
- Jing-Pha Tsai
- Eugene Wong
- I-Chen Wu
- Bo-Yin Yang
- Stephen Sik-Sang Yau

== Geologists ==
- Chang Jen-hu, geologist
- Chung Sun-lin, geologist
- Juhn G. Liou, geologist
- Kuo-Fong Ma, seismologist
- Teng Ta-liang, seismologist
- Wei Kuo-yen, oceanographer

== Physicians ==
- Chang Ching-wen, public health doctor
- Chang Mei-hwei, physician and hepatologist
- Ding-Shinn Chen, hepatologist
- Chen Pei-jer, hepatologist
- Chen Yung-hsing, psychiatrist
- Yuan-Tsong Chen, physician
- Shang-Yi Chiang, physician
- Chuang Shu-chi, radiologist
- Robert Lai, engineer
- Geng Long Hsu, physician
- Nancy Y. Lee, radiologist
- Yu-Chuan Jack Li, dermatologist
- Liaw Yun-fan, hepatologist
- Lin Chieh-liang, toxicologist
- Lin Chin-hsing, physician
- Lin Ching-yi, gynaecologist and obstetrician
- Lin Fang-yue, physician
- Hui-Kuan Lin, physician
- Jaung-Geng Lin, gynaecologist and obstetrician
- Lin Ruey-shiung, public health doctor
- Lin Tsung-yi, psychiatrist
- Fu-Tong Liu, dermatologist
- Susan Shur-Fen Gau, psychiatrist
- Shen Meng-ru, physician
- Shen Fu-hsiung, physician
- Su Ching-chuan, physician
- Huey-Kang Sytwu, physician
- Ming T. Tsuang, psychiatrist
- Tu Tsung-ming, toxicologist
- Wang King-ho, general practitioner

== Physicists ==
- Chia-Seng Chang
- Leroy Chang
- Yia-Chung Chang
- Alexander Wu Chao
- Li-Chyong Chen
- Sow-Hsin Chen
- Margaret S. Cheung
- Chia Chih-ta
- Mei-Yin Chou
- Chu Kwo-ray
- Shun Lien Chuang
- Guang-Yu Guo
- Lan-Hsuan Huang
- Leaf Huang
- Che-Ming Ko
- Louis Lee
- Ting-Kuo Lee
- Chii-Dong Lin
- Ching-Liang Lin
- Ming-Fa Lin
- Chen-Yu Liu
- Keh-Fei Liu
- Ni Wei-tou
- Ci-Ling Pan
- Shen Chun-shan
- Chih-Kang Shih
- Lee C. Teng
- Jaw-Shen Tsai
- Kang L. Wang
- Wu Jong-shinn
- Maw-Kuen Wu
- Wu Ta-You
- Yang Hung-duen
- Horng-Tzer Yau
- Chien-Peng Yuan
- Jian-Min Yuan (physicist)

== Philosophers ==
- Bo Yang
- Chung-ying Cheng
- Hung Chi-sheng
- Thomé H. Fang
- Chungliang Al Huang
- Lin Yu-sheng
- Lin Yutang
- Mou Zongsan
- Vincent Shen
- Su Yu-chang
- Yin Haiguang

== Other scientists ==
- Yang Jih-sung, forensic scientist
- Yun Yen, cancer researcher

== See also ==
- List of Taiwanese mathematicians
- List of Taiwanese people
