= Fellow of the American Association for the Advancement of Science =

Award and fellowship

Fellowship of the American Association for the Advancement of Science (FAAAS)
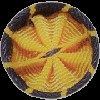
- AAAS Fellow Rosette Pin
- Awarded for: For meritorious contributions to science
- Date: 1848
- Location: Washington, D.C.
- Country: United States
- Website: www.aaas.org/elected-fellows

Fellowship of the American Association for the Advancement of Science (FAAAS) is an honor accorded by the American Association for the Advancement of Science (AAAS) to distinguished persons who are members of the Association. Fellows are elected annually by the AAAS Council for "efforts on behalf of the advancement of science or its applications [which] are scientifically or socially distinguished".

Examples of areas in which nominees may have made significant contributions are research; teaching; technology; services to professional societies; administration in academe, industry, and government; and communicating and interpreting science to the public. The association has awarded fellowships since 1874. AAAS publishes annual update of active Fellows list, which also provides email address to verify status of non-active Fellows.

== AAAS Fellows ==
AAAS Fellows include Nobel Prize winners Michael W. Young and Michael Rosbash, ACM Turing Award winner David Patterson, IEEE Medal of Honor winner Irwin M. Jacobs, American Physical Society Fellow Natalie Roe, cancer researcher Yun Yen, human growth researcher Michelle Lampl, plant biologist Katayoon Dehesh, and many more. Maria Elena Zavala, who is a recipient of the Presidential Award for Excellence in Science, Mathematics, and Engineering Mentoring, is also a Fellow.

Other fellows includes Jiaxing Huang, and Duan Xiangfeng, a materials scientist who received the Beilby Medal and Prize in 2013.

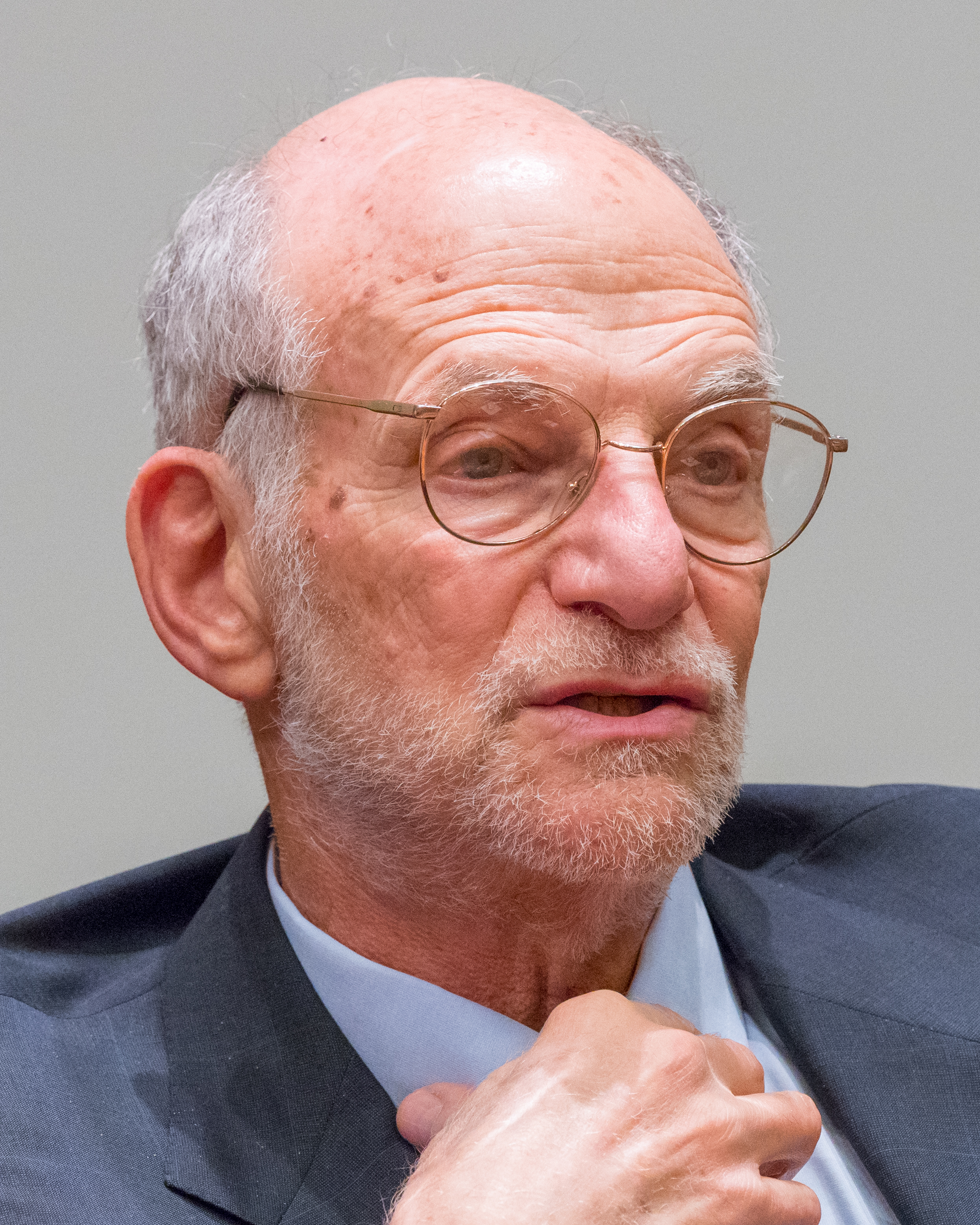
Nobel Prize:
Michael Rosbash

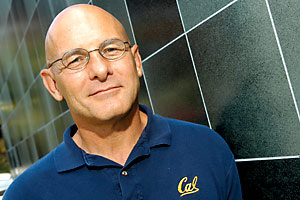
ACM Turing Award: David Patterson

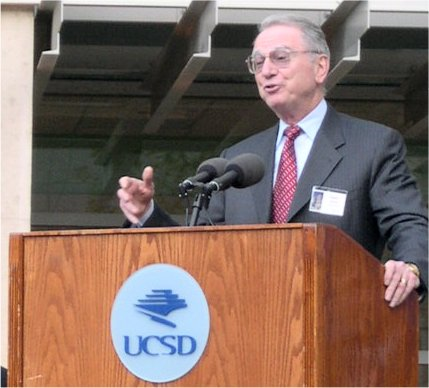
IEEE Medal of Honor: Irwin Jacobs

== Revocation for harassment ==
Starting 15 October 2018, the status of a Fellow can be revoked "in cases of proven scientific misconduct, serious breaches of professional ethics, or when the Fellow in the view of the AAAS otherwise no longer merits the status of Fellow". This is to limit the effects and tolerance of sexual harassment, which Margaret Hamburg, the president of the AAAS said "has no place in science".

This ruling has allowed AAAS to sanction Francisco Ayala, formerly of University of California, Irvine; Thomas Jessell, formerly of Columbia University; Lawrence Krauss, of Arizona State University, Tempe; and Inder Verma, formerly of the Salk Institute for Biological Studies in San Diego, California.
