= List of Taiwanese mathematicians =

This is a list of notable Taiwanese mathematicians.

== C ==
- Chen Wen-chen: b. 1950
- Ching-Li Chai: b. 1956
- Bang-Yen Chen: b. 1943
- Goong Chen: b. 1950

== D ==
- Naihua Duan: b. 1949

== H ==
- Hsin-Cheng Huang
- Li-Shan Huang
- Lan-Hsuan Huang

== K ==
- Chiu-Yen Kao: b. 1974
- Frances Kuo

== L ==
- Tien-Yien Li: b. 1945
- Winnie Li: b. 1948
- Chang-Shou Lin: b. 1951
- Chiu-Chu Melissa Liu: b. 1974
- Tai-Ping Liu: b. 1945

== N ==
- Wei-Ming Ni: b. 1950

== S ==
- Mei-Chi Shaw: b. 1955
- Shu Shien-Siu: b. 1912

== T ==
- Chuu-Lian Terng: b. 1949

== W ==
- Mu-Tao Wang: b. 1966
- Jang-Mei Wu: b. 1949

== Y ==
- Grace Yang
- Horng-Tzer Yau: b. 1959
- Shih-Hsien Yu: b. 1964

== See also ==
- List of Taiwanese scientists
