= De-Maw Chuang =

Taiwanese-American neuroscientist

De-Maw Chuang (Chinese: 莊德茂) is a Taiwanese-American neuroscientist.

== Education and career ==
After Chuang graduated from National Taiwan University in 1966, he took his father's advice to study abroad, subsequently completing his doctorate at Stony Brook University in 1971, where he was advised by Melvin Simpson. Chuang worked with Herbert Weissbach at the Roche Institute of Molecular Biology as a postdoctoral researcher. Weissbach advised Chuang to look for a position at the National Institute of Health. Chuang was a NIH researcher from 1973 to 2014.

Chuang was elected a member of Taiwan's Academia Sinica in 2006.
