= Andrew Le =

Andrew Le may refer to:

- Andrew Le (researcher)
- Andrew Le (chef)

== See also ==
- Andrew Lee (disambiguation)
