= Jerry Straka =

American atmospheric scientist

Jerry Michael Straka
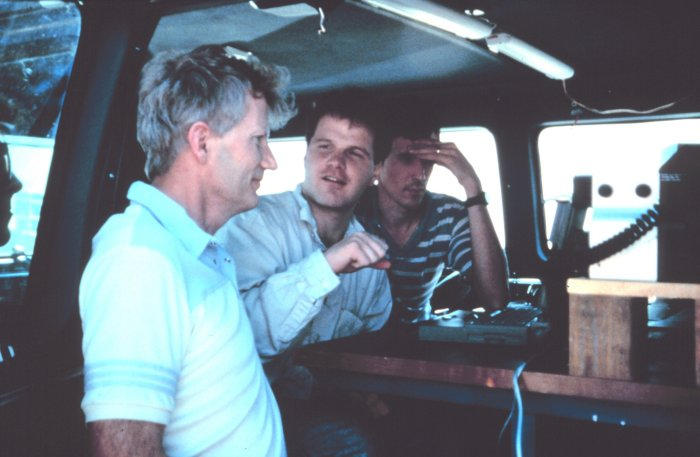
- Straka (center), Bob Davies-Jones (left), and Erik Rasmussen (right) during Project VORTEX on 14 April 1994.
- Education: University of Wisconsin–Milwaukee (B.S., 1984; M.S., 1986); University of Wisconsin–Madison (Ph.D., 1989)
- Known for: Severe convective storm field research and numerical modeling, model development, cloud and precipitation physics and observations, development and deployment of mobile mesonets and mobile Doppler radars
- Scientific career
- Fields: Meteorology
- Workplaces: University of Oklahoma
- Thesis: Hail Growth in a Highly Glaciated Central High Plains Multi-cellular Hailstorm (1989)
- Doctoral advisor: Pao K. Wang
- Other academic advisors: Robert Ballentine
- Doctoral students: Paul Markowski

Jerry Michael Straka is an American atmospheric scientist with expertise microphysics of clouds, cloud modeling, and dynamics of severe convection in conjunction with weather radar. He was in leadership roles in both the VORTEX projects and subsequent field research focusing on tornadogenesis.

Straka earned a B.S. and M.S. in 1984 and 1986, respectively, from the University of Wisconsin–Milwaukee. His masters dissertation was: A Mesoscale Numerical Study of Environmental Conditions Preceding the 08 June 1984 Tornado Outbreak over South Central Wisconsin. Straka earned a Ph.D. in meteorology from the University of Wisconsin–Madison in 1989 with the doctoral dissertation: Hail Growth in a Highly Glaciated Central High Plains Multi-cellular Hailstorm. He is a professor at the University of Oklahoma in Norman.

== See also ==
- Robert Davies-Jones
- Katharine Kanak
- Paul Markowski
- Erik N. Rasmussen
