= NCTS =

NCTS may refer to:

- NASCAR Canadian Tire Series, former name of the NASCAR Pinty's Series
- NASCAR Truck Series
- National Center for Theoretical Sciences
- National Center for Transportation Studies
- Northern Cheyenne Tribal School
