= Zhang Yazhong =

Zhang Yazhong may refer to:

- Chang Ya-chung (born 1954), Taiwanese political scientist
- Yia-Chung Chang, Taiwanese physicist
- Zhang Yazhong (politician, born 1965) (born 1964), Chinese People's Political Consultative Conference vice chairman and secretary general in Heilongjiang
