= Lee Ting-kuo =

Lee Ting-kuo may refer to:

- Ting-Kuo Lee, Taiwanese physicist
- Li Dingguo (1621–1662), general affiliated with the Southern Ming

== See also ==
- Li Kou-tin (born 1938), Taiwanese table tennis player
- Feng Ting-kuo (1950–2018), Taiwanese politician
