= Polydefkis =

Polydefkis is a given name and a surname. People with the name include:

- Michael Polydefkis, American neurologist
- Polydefkis Volanakis{born 2003), Greek footballer
