= Michael Polydefkis =

American neurologist

- Born: Chicago, Illinois, USA
- Spouse: Kelly Gebo

Academic background
- Education: BS, Biochemistry, 1988, Brown University; MD, 1993, Johns Hopkins University School of Medicine

Academic work
- Institutions: Johns Hopkins University School of Medicine

Michael James Polydefkis is an American neurologist. He is a professor of neurology at Johns Hopkins University School of Medicine and co-director of the Cutaneous Nerve Laboratory. Polydefkis' research focuses on treating hATTR amyloidosis and diabetic and HIV-associated peripheral neuropathy.

== Early life and education ==
Polydefkis was born and raised in Chicago, Illinois, to Greek immigrant Dimitri and Lee Carmichael Polydefkis. He attended Brown University for his Bachelor of Science degree in Biochemistry before accepting a Howard Hughes Medical Student Fellowship for three years. During his fellowship program, he worked in Robert F. Siliciano’s laboratory and studied pathways of antigen processing. After concluding his fellowship program, he enrolled at Johns Hopkins University School of Medicine for his medical degree.

== Career ==
Upon completing his MHS Graduate Training Program in Clinical Investigation, Polydefkis joined the faculty at Johns Hopkins University School of Medicine as an associate professor. During his tenure at Johns Hopkins, his research focused on developing novel measures of peripheral nerve disease and sensitive outcome measures for clinical trials. He was the lead author of a study in 2014 which found that patients with diabetic peripheral neuropathy have trouble on stairs, which can be aided by exercise. Polydefkis's research also found that "epidermal innervation is affected early in diabetes and pre‐diabetes and that novel measures of regeneration can be used in peripheral neuropathy trials."

During his tenure at Johns Hopkins, Polydefkis also specialized in treating hATTR amyloidosis and developed the first effective treatment for transthyretin amyloidosis. He collaborated with Phillip Zamore and his company Alnylam Pharmaceuticals to disperse an experimental drug aimed at silencing the chemical blueprint for protein. As word arose of new approaches to treat this disease, Polydefkis and members of Johns Hopkins faculty aided in completing trials of the drug. In his lab, Polydefkis developed a protocol to test for amyloid using punch skin biopsies which yielded positive results. As a result of his research, Polydefkis received the 2019 Donlin M. Long Award, given to those who "have served the Johns Hopkins community in advancing the standards of pain care and embodied the institution’s dedication to alleviate suffering and pain associated with illness."

== Personal life ==
Polydefkis and his wife Kelly Gebo have two children together.
