= National Hsinchu Senior High School =

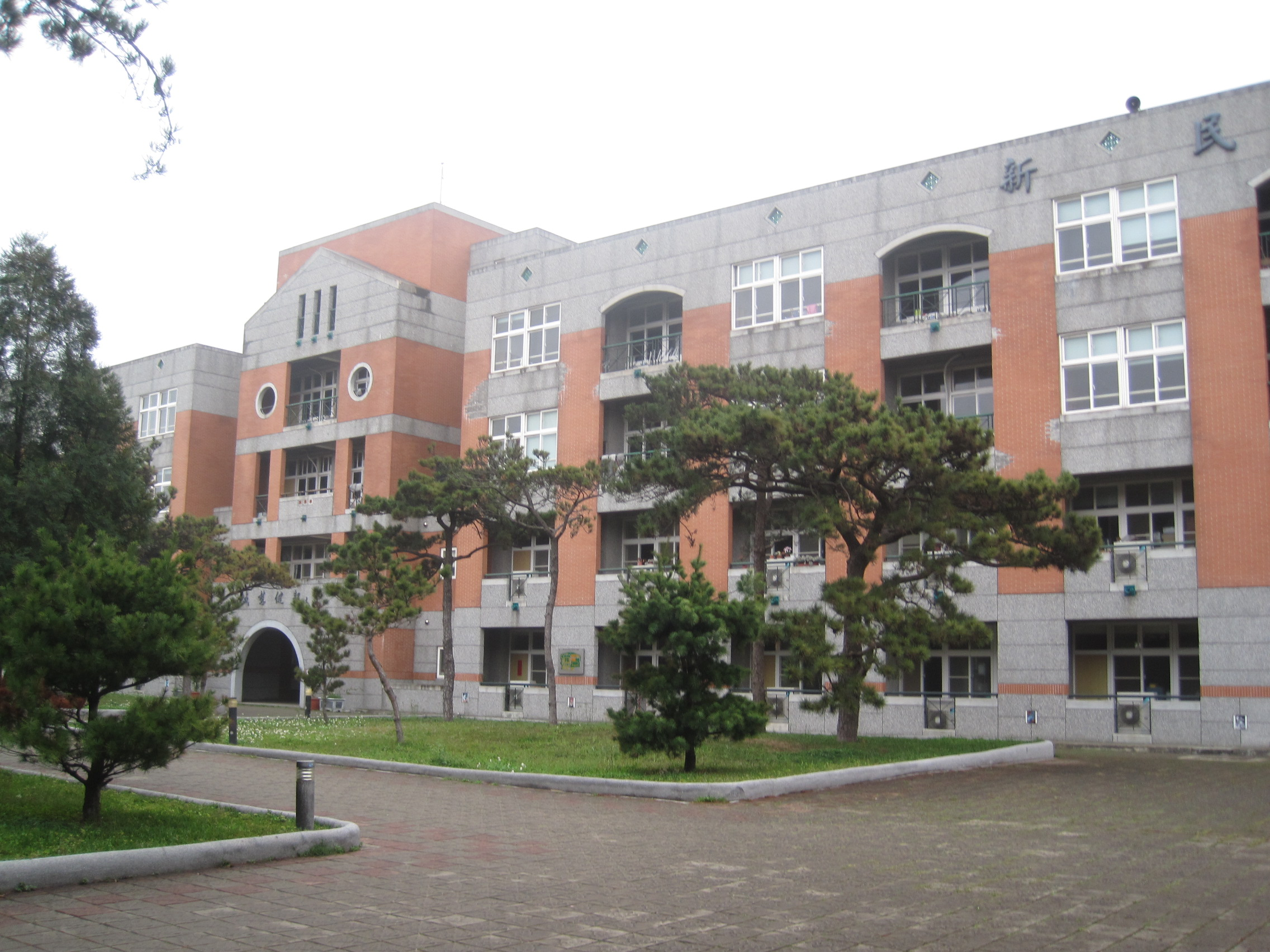

Location
- No.36, Xue-Fu Rd., East, Hsinchu City, Taiwan

Information
- Type: National High School
- Motto: Honesty, Wisdom, the Glorious Health and Perseverance
- Established: 1922
- Principal: Chen-Hsiang Guo
- Enrollment: Male：1846/Female：50 (2023~2024)
- Area: 9.47 ha (23.4 acres)
- Website: www.hchs.hc.edu.tw

National Hsinchu Senior High School (Chinese: 國立新竹高級中學) is a high school in East District, Hsinchu City, Taiwan. Student enrollment averages around 2200.

Although traditionally an all-boy institution, National Hsinchu Senior High School started admitting females into the music program in 1998.

== History ==
HCHS, originally called Shinchiku Prefectural Shinchiku Middle School (Japanese: 新竹州立新竹中學校), was established on 1 April 1922. After World War II in 1945, it was renamed Taiwan Provincial Hsinchu High School. In July 1968, after compulsory education was extended to nine years, it was renamed Taiwan Provincial Hsinchu Senior High School, and on 1 February 2000, renamed National Hsinchu Senior High School.

After the restoration in 1945, HCHS was a six-year high school, with a three-year Junior and a three-year Senior High division. However, the junior high division was suspended in 1957. In 1987, HCHS was directed to set up a math and science gifted class, in 1998, a music-gifted class, and in 2004 a language and literature gifted class.

== Buildings and facilities ==
HCHS covers an area of 10 hectares, well equipped with a students' activity center, gym, swimming pool, athletic field and sport courts. Besides, in buildings for teaching, such as Building of Science, Building of Arts and Crafts, and Resource Building, there are Science Lab, Home Economics Classroom, Automatized Lab for Life and Technology program, Art Classroom and Music Classroom, Computer Classroom and Multimedia Language Classroom. On the campus are male and female dormitories to house students living far away.

== Achievement ==
Every year, students participate in international science exhibitions and are constant winners in international Olympic Games for science.

The musical clubs such as the choir, the brass band, the harmonica club and the Chinese music club have a long history. They attend national musical contests and win many prizes every year.

=== Achievement of the Provincial Choir Competition ===
- 1960 to 1968 - HCHS got every year's championship of the provincial choir competition.
- 1970 - HCHS got the championship again.
- 1971 - HCHS had got 10 years' championship until 1970, the Ministry of Education claimed that HCHS would perform for pre-competition example, but wouldn't be allowed to participate in the competition.

=== Distinguished teachers ===
- Su Sen-yong - Prominent Taiwanese music educator

=== Distinguished alumni ===
- Yuan T. Lee: Nobel Prize laureate in Chemistry, 1986; National Medal of Science, 1986; Member of National Academy of Sciences, 1979; Fellow, American Academy of Arts and Sciences, 1975; Member of Academia Sinica, 1980; President of Academia Sinica, 1994–2006.
- Norden E. Huang: Member of National Academy of Engineering, 2000; Member of Academia Sinica, 2004.
- Chien-Fu Jeff Wu: Member of National Academy of Engineering, 2004; Member of Academia Sinica, 2000; Coca-Cola Professor, Georgia Institute of Technology.
- Burn-Jeng Lin: Member of National Academy of Engineering, 2008; Member of Academia Sinica, 2014; VP of Research & Development, TSMC.
- Sung Juei-low: Member of Academia Sinica, 1982; Presidential Science Prize, 2001.
- Shie-Ming Peng: Member of Academia Sinica, 1998; Fellow of the Royal Society of Chemistry, 2009; Presidential Science Prize, 2013; Professor Chemistry, National Taiwan University.
- Yuan-Chuan Lee: Member of Academia Sinica, 1994; Academy Professor and Research Professor, Johns Hopkins University.
- Yun-Fan Liaw: Member of Academia Sinica, 2000; Chair Professor of Chang Gung Medical School.
- Ming-Chang Lin: Member of Academia Sinica, 2000.
- Leo Ou-fan Lee: Member of Academia Sinica, 2002; Guggenheim Fellow; Chinese commentator and author.
- Kopin Liu: Member of Academia Sinica, 2004; Presidential Science Prize; Distinguished Research Fellow, Institute of Atomic and Molecular Sciences, Academia Sinica, 2002–Present; Distinguished Research Chair Professor, Department of Physics, National Taiwan University, 2010–Present.
- Yuan-Pern Lee: Member of Academia Sinica, 2008; Fellow of American Physical Society, 1999; Fellow of The Academy of Sciences for the Developing World, 2011; Chair Professor of National Chiao Tung University.
- Lih-Juann Chen: Member of Academia Sinica, 2006; Fellow of Materials Research Society, 2011; Distinguished Chair Professor, National Tsing Hua University, 2006–Present; President, National Tsing Hua University, 2010–2014.
- Bor-ming Jahn: Member of Academia Sinica, 2012; Fellow, Geochemical Society, 2006; Fellow, European Association for Geochemistry, 2006; Fellow, Geological Society of America, 2004; Chair Professor of Geosciences, National Taiwan University.
- Shi-Kuo Chang: IEEE Fellow, 1986; Professor of Computer Science, University of Pittsburgh.
- Bing Sheu: IEEE Fellow, 1996; Director of R&D, TSMC.
- Hsiao-Dong Chiang: IEEE Fellow, 1997; Presidential Young Investigator Award, 1989; Professor of Electrical and Computer Engineering, Cornell University.
- Wu-Tung Cheng: IEEE Fellow, 2000; Chief Scientist, Mentor Graphics Corporation.
- John Yen: IEEE Fellow, 2000; Presidential Young Investigator Award, 1992; Professor of Data Science, Penn State University.
- Steve S. Chung: IEEE Fellow, 2006; Chair Professor, National Chiao Tung University.

== Trivia ==
- Upon the award of Nobel Prize in 1986, Yuan T. Lee replicated the Nobel Prize medal and donated it to the school, due to his appreciation its influence on him.
- Like many other historic high schools, the library holds Japanese collections that date back to the Japanese period.

== Sisterly relationship ==
- In 2006, HCHS set up sisterly relationship with Gyeonggibuk Science High School in South Korea.
- In 2009, HCHS set up sisterly relationship with Miyoshi High School of Hiroshima in Japan.

== See also ==
- Education in Taiwan
