= Su Sen-yong =

Sen-Yong Su

Sen-Yong Su/Su Sen-Yong (蘇森墉) (8 July 1919 - 18 May 2007) was a prominent music educator at the Hsinchu Senior High School, in Taiwan. He was born in Taipei, Taiwan, and spent his adolescent years in the city of Zhangzhou, Fujian, where he attended the Longxi middle and high schools.

At the age of 19, at the outbreak of the war against Japan, Su moved to Yongding county in Fujian, where he was a teacher of arts, music and gymnastics at the Yongding Provincial Middle School. A year later he attended the National Fujian Academy of Music, majoring in vocal music.

In 1946, Sen-Yong was appointed as music teacher at the Hsinchu Junior High School. Su's music was selected to become the official school song, accompanying lyrics written by school principal Hsin Chih-Ping (辛志平). In the 1960s and early 70s Sen-Yong led the Hsinchu School Choir to many repeated championships of the province-wide chorus competitions, and also directed the Taipei Women's Normal High School Choir. He retired in 1973 from Hsinchu Senior High School.

After spending several years residing in Brazil, Su returned to Taiwan where he continued to be active in the music world as the conductor of the Industrial Technology Research Institute Chorus and the Hsinchu Science Park Chorus, and also being honored for his musical contributions through concerts and compilations of his chorus compositions.

Sen-Yong was diagnosed with Parkinson's disease. He died at the age of 88.

== Musical Compositions ==
Most of Sen-Yong's compositions were written for the choruses that he conducted over the years. But he has also composed for the piano and for a string quartet.

In 1967, under the influence of Professor De-Yi Liu (劉德義), German composer Paul Hindemith, and the traditional Chinese five-notes scale, Sen-Yong was able to create a more distinctive and modern style.

Here is a list of his choral arrangements and compositions:

1938-1945 新中國的空軍, 龍崗頌 (Longgang Chung), 遙寄個思念

1946-1967 新竹中學校歌，野玫瑰 (Heidenroslein)，菩提樹 (Der Lindenbaum)，花，農村曲 (A Rural Song)，故鄉 (Hometown)，大江東去 (The River Goes East)，踏雪尋梅，上山 (Up the Mountain)，拉縴行，東山四季、採茶歌、魔王，

1968-1977 青春舞曲 (Dance of Youth), 謊歌 (Song about a Lie), 春曉 (Spring Dawn), 只要你早回家 (Only If You Return Home Early), 愁 (Sorrow), 日月潭 (Sun Moon Lake), 谷關之夜, 西湖秋泛, 征曲, 彎彎的垂柳青青的山

1977-2000 天使報信 (Message from an Angel), 白牡丹 (White Peony), 滿山春色 (Spring in the Mountains), 園丁頌, 月舞曲, 新竹市讚歌 (Paean to Hsinchu)，牧童情歌, 合唱頌

2000-2007 感恩道歌, 良心光明真是好, 慈母常在我心, 父親吶父親, 大自然頌
