= James F. Bonner =

American molecular biologist

- Born: September 1, 1910; Ansley, Nebraska, U.S.
- Died: September 13, 1996 (aged 86)
- Education: University of Utah (BA); California Institute of Technology (PhD)
- Known for: Devising a better way to collect natural rubber from trees; discovering histones control gene activity
- Scientific career
- Fields: Molecular biology
- Institutions: California Institute of Technology
- Notable students: Ru Chih C. Huang

James Frederick Bonner (September 1, 1910 – September 13, 1996) was an American molecular biologist and plant physiologist, a member of the National Academy of Sciences, known for his work in plant biochemistry and gene regulation. He was professor and professor emeritus of biology at the California Institute of Technology.

Bonner developed improved methods for collecting natural rubber from trees, an advance that contributed to substantial increases in production. He also contributed to methods for mechanical harvesting of oranges. One of his notable findings was the role of histone proteins in regulating gene activity.

== Life and career ==
Bonner was born in Ansley, Nebraska in 1910. Bonner grew up in a family with strong scientific interests; several of his siblings later pursued scientific careers, including his younger brother, the biochemical geneticist David M. Bonner, who was also subsequently elected to the National Academy of Sciences. During a family sabbatical year at the California Institute of Technology in 1929, James Bonner worked as a research assistant to Theodosius Dobzhansky.

Bonner graduated from the University of Utah in 1931 with B.A. degree in chemistry and mathematics. He received the Ph.D. in biology at California Institute of Technology in 1934. Bonner spent the year after his Ph.D. in Europe on a National Research Council fellowship at Utrecht, Leiden and ETH in Zurich. He was a postdoctoral fellow at California Institute of Technology after his return from Europe, then joined the faculty in 1936.

=== Plant Physiology ===
Early in his career, he invented a method for collecting rubber tree exudate (natural rubber) that greatly improved the efficiency of the process. He also invented a mechanical method for harvesting oranges. He studied the timing of processes in plants.

=== Histones ===
In the dawn of molecular biology in the 1960s, his interest turned to gene expression, in particular the regulation of production of RNA from genes. Experiments in his laboratory in collaboration with his postdoctoral fellow Ru Chih C. Huang showed that histone, a protein associated with the genes, shuts off gene activity. If the histone fraction is extracted from isolated chromatin, more RNA is made whereas if histone is added back, the transcription of RNA is greatly decreased. In the course of these experiments, Huang and Bonner discovered DNA-dependent RNA polymerase, but Bonner noted in a biographical article that several other groups discovered the enzyme simultaneously. They decided to focus on regulation rather than simply RNA production. Bonner continued to work on histones, establishing methods reproducibly to isolate each type of histone, along with graduate student Douglas Fambrough. Eventually they purified individual histones from pea plants and from calf thymus and showed, in collaboration with Emil Smith at UCLA, that the amino acid compositions and sequences of the same type of histone (histone H4) isolated from these widely disparate organisms were virtually identical.

Bonner wrote over 500 scientific papers on all aspects of plant physiology as well as 10 textbooks.

He was elected to the National Academy of Sciences in 1950 in the field of Plant Biology, the American Academy of Arts and Sciences in 1960, and the American Philosophical Society in 1966.

James F. Bonner died on September 13, 1996.
