= Herbert Weissbach (biochemist) =

American biochemist (born 1932)

- Born: March 16, 1932; Bronx, New York City
- Education: Bronx High School of Science
- Alma mater: City College of New York (B.S.); George Washington University (Ph.D.)
- Scientific career
- Fields: Biochemistry; Molecular Biology
- Workplaces: Roche Institute of Molecular Biology; Florida Atlantic University
- Thesis: Studies on 5-Hydroxyindole Metabolism (1957)
- Academic advisors: Horace Barker

Dr. Herbert Weissbach NAS NAI AAM (born 16 March 1932) is an American biochemist/molecular biologist.

He was born in the Bronx, New York City, where he spent his childhood. He is one of 3 children, having a younger sister Carol and an older brother Arthur, also a biochemist. He obtained his high school diploma from the Bronx High School of Science and a B.S. degree, majoring in chemistry, from the City College of New York (1953).

Upon graduation, he was recruited by Dr. Sidney Udenfriend to the National Heart Institute of National Institutes of Health (NIH) to enter a new joint graduate program between the NIH and George Washington University. He received his Ph.D. from George Washington University based on research done at the NIH in the Udenfriend laboratory. In 1958, the NIH supported his postdoctoral studies with Dr. H.A. Barker at the University of California at Berkeley, where he was involved in the discovery of the coenzyme form of vitamin B12.

In 1959, he returned to the NIH as an independent investigator where he continued his studies on the role of vitamin B12 in methionine biosynthesis, research that helped to elucidate the known inter-relationship among vitamin B12, folic acid and one-carbon metabolism. The studies on methionine synthesis led to his collaboration with the Nirenberg laboratory at the NIH shortly after the genetic code was cracked.

By 1967, the Weissbach laboratory was deeply involved in protein synthesis (translation) at which time he helped found the Roche Institute of Molecular Biology (RIMB) with Sidney Udenfriend. In 1983 he became director of the RIMB and a vice-president of research at Hoffmann-La Roche, Nutley, NJ. The RIMB was involved in the very early days of the emergence of the biotechnology industry and was instrumental in helping Roche enter this field. Weissbach described this period at Roche in a 2016 book he co-authored titled "A Camelot of the Biomedical Sciences: The Story of the Roche Institute of Molecular Biology".

After the RIMB closed in 1997, he accepted a position as distinguished research professor at Florida Atlantic University (FAU), where he founded, and was director of, the Center for Molecular Biology and Biotechnology for 20 years. In 2017, he was appointed Distinguished Research Professor Emeritus at FAU. His most recent work has involved understanding the mechanisms that cells use to protect against oxidative damage, based on the observation that cells have a mechanism to protect against oxidative damage to methionine residues in proteins.

== Notable awards ==
- Election to the National Academy of Sciences (1982–Present)
- 300 most cited authors (1961-1976), Current Content July 10, 1978
- Superior Service Award of the Department of Health Education and Welfare (1968)
- Pfizer Award in Enzyme Chemistry(1970)
- Townsend Harris Medal of the City College of New York Alumni Association (1988)
- George Washington University Distinguished Alumni Award (1994)
- Member of the American Academy of Microbiology (1997)
- Charter Fellow of the National Academy of inventors (2012)
- BioFlorida Lifetime Achievement Award
