= Kelly Gebo =

American epidemiologist (born 1970)

- Born: 1970 (age 55–56); New York City, USA
- Spouse: Michael Polydefkis
- Children: 2

Academic background
- Education: BS, 1992, MPH, Johns Hopkins Bloomberg School of Public Health; MD, 1995, Johns Hopkins University School of Medicine

Kelly Anne Gebo (born 1970) is an American epidemiologist and infectious disease specialist. She was the inaugural Vice Provost for Education at Johns Hopkins University and served as the Chief Medical and Scientific Officer for the All of Us Research Program at the National Institutes of Health.

Gebo was recognized by the American Society for Clinical Investigation for her research in health care disparities, access to care, health care utilization, and errors in medicine.

== Early life and education ==
Gebo was born and raised in New York by parents Patricia and Robert Gebo. During her senior year of high school, Gebo applied for early decision at Harvard University where she was deferred and eventually rejected. After graduating high school in 1988, Gebo applied to numerous colleges including Johns Hopkins Bloomberg School of Public Health where she eventually accepted her placement. She completed her medical degree in 1995 and conducted her medical residency and fellowship at Johns Hopkins University School of Medicine.

== Career ==
Gebo completed an infectious diseases fellowship with the Robert Wood Johnson Clinical Scholars Program and joined the faculty at Johns Hopkins Hospital in 2001. During her tenure at Johns Hopkins, Gebo has continued to focus on research in health care disparities, access to care, health care utilization, and errors in medicine. In 2003, she co-led a study with George Siberry in researching why children, as opposed to adults, access HIV-related health care services more often. She also was the co-investigator of the HIV Research Network, a longitudinal clinical cohort study of high-volume HIV sites caring for over 20,000 persons with HIV across the country. Two years later, she became the director of Johns Hopkins Zanvyl Krieger School of Arts and Sciences's Undergraduate Public Health Studies Program.

In her role as director and associate professor, Gebo continued to advocate for HIV health services research and study clinical outcomes of persons with HIV. She was also the senior author of a study which found that delayed treatment for patients with HIV resulted in tens of thousands of dollars more in care. In 2013, Gebo was recognized by the American Society for Clinical Investigation for her research in health care disparities, access to care, health care utilization, and errors in medicine. That same year, she published data from a research project with Baligh R. Yehia in which they studied 36,845 patients from 13 clinics within the HIV Research Network from 2001 to 2011. The result of their research found that there was no difference in the treatment or care of HIV-positive transgender people with other men and women living with the disease. In 2014, Gebo became Johns Hopkins inaugural Vice Provost for Education.

In 2018, Gebo accepted a position as the Chief Medical and Scientific Officer for the All of Us Research Program at the National Institutes of Health. The program focuses on advancing precision medicine by building a national research cohort in the United States.

== Personal life ==
Gebo and her husband, neurologist Michael Polydefkis, have two children together.
