= Andrew Le (researcher) =

American medical researcher

Andrew Le is an American medical researcher. He research and publishes his work on AI use in healthcare and brain cancer.

== Life and education ==
He was born in the United States to Vietnamese immigrants who escaped Vietnam by boat in 1979. He attended Taylor High School, where he actively participated in charity work, raising funds for shelters after Hurricane Katrina.

He pursued higher education at Harvard College, graduating magna cum laude and Phi Beta Kappa. He then earned his doctorate of medicine from Harvard Medical School, specializing in neurosurgery.

== Career and research ==
During his medical training, he observed patients frequently resorting to online symptom searches, leading to misinformation and potential harm to their health. While a third-year medical resident at Harvard Medical School in 2014, Le co-founded Buoy Health with his colleague Eddie Reyes. He developed an AI-powered digital health tool that would function as a health-specific search engine, offering patients information and guidance.

Le and his colleagues gathered enough data to educate the algorithm by hand-reading the 18,000-plus articles, then developing an algorithm to crunch the figures in real-time for everyone.

He looked at 100 standardized cases with 33 varied diagnoses, ranging from a harmless cough to a potentially fatal pulmonary embolism, as well as the incidence of uncommon illnesses like histoplasmosis and the common cold.

He has led Buoy through two successful investment rounds, raising over $67 million with healthcare investors like Optum, Cigna, Humana, and WR Hambrecht + Co, since establishing the firm out of Harvard Innovation Labs in 2014.

== Selected publications ==
- Le, Andrew; Reinshagen, Clemens; Redjal, Navid; Walcott, Brian P.; McDonnell, Erin; Dietrich, Jorg; Nahed, Brian V. (May 2016). "Valproic acid, compared to other antiepileptic drugs, is associated with improved overall and progression-free survival in glioblastoma but worse outcome in grade II/III gliomas treated with temozolomide". Journal of Neuro-Oncology. 127 (3): 505–514. doi:10.1007/s11060-016-2054-8. PMID 26830093.
- Le, Andrew; Tsimelzon, Anna; Long, Weiwen; Foulds, Charles E.; Tsai, Sophia Y.; Tsai, Ming-Jer; O'Malley, Bert W. (1 May 2010). "Research Resource: Expression Profiling Reveals Unexpected Targets and Functions of the Human Steroid Receptor RNA Activator (SRA) Gene". Molecular Endocrinology. 24 (5): 1090–1105. doi:10.1210/me.2009-0427. PMC 2870939. PMID 20219889.
- Le, Andrew; Walcott, Brian P.; Redjal, Navid; Coumans, Jean-Valery (October 2014). "Cervical osteophyte resulting in compression of the jugular foramen: Case report". Journal of Neurosurgery: Spine. 21 (4): 565–567. doi:10.3171/2014.6.SPINE13908.
- Le, Andrew; Barkauskas (August 2014). "Repair and Regeneration of the Respiratory System: Complexity, Plasticity, and Mechanisms of Lung Stem Cell Function". Cell Stem Cell. 15 (2): 123–138. doi:10.1016/j.stem.2014.07.012. PMC 4212493. PMID 25105578.
