= Pien-Chien Huang =

Chinese-American molecular biologist (1931–2020)

Pien-Chien Huang (Chinese: 黃秉乾; pinyin: Huáng Bǐngqián; 13 July 1931 – 3 August 2020) was a Chinese-American molecular biologist.

== Life and career ==
Huang was born in Shanghai on 13 July 1931. He graduated from National Taiwan University in 1952 with a bachelor's degree in agriculture. Huang then earned a master's degree at Virginia Tech in 1956, followed by a doctorate from Ohio State University in 1960. He was elected to the Academia Sinica in 1986, and taught at National Tsing Hua University in Taiwan from 1993 to 1996, concurrently serving as dean of the College of Life Sciences at NTHU. Huang taught at Johns Hopkins University's Bloomberg School of Public Health for five decades, where he was professor of biochemistry and molecular biology. Huang was also a correspondence research fellow at Academia Sinica. He was married to Ru-Chih Chow Huang from 1956 to his death in 2020.
