= Hui-Kuan Lin =

Cancer Biology researcher

Hui-Kuan Lin is a Taiwanese physician specializing in cancer biology.

== Education and career ==
Lin completed bachelor's and master's degrees in medicine at National Taiwan University, in 1993 and 1995, respectively. He completed a doctoral degree in cancer biology at the University of Rochester in 2002, and pursued postdoctoral research at Memorial Sloan-Kettering Cancer Center. From 2007, Lin taught at the M. D. Anderson Cancer Center, a part of the University of Texas System, as an assistant professor. In 2011, he became an associate professor. Lin moved to the Wake Forest Baptist Medical Center in 2015, as Anderson Professor for Cancer Research, Endowed Professor of Cancer Biology, and director of the Prostate Cancer Center of Excellence. In 2018, Lin was named director of the Signaling and Biotechnology Program.

In 2022 he was elected to the Academia Sinica.
