= Teresa Wang =

Taiwanese pathologist

Teresa Shu-Fong Wang (born November 16, 1937) is a Taiwanese-American biochemist. She is a professor emeritus at Stanford University, and the K. Bensch Endowed Chair Professor in Experimental Pathology of Department of Pathology at the Stanford University School of Medicine. Her scientific pursuit focuses on the biochemical mechanisms of chromosome replication proteins, and molecular mechanisms of their involvement in maintaining genome integrity during chromosome replication.

== Early life and education ==
Teresa S. Wang was born in China but later moved to Taiwan after 1949. She earned her Bachelor of Science (B.S.) degree in biochemistry from National Taiwan University in 1960, then earned her Ph.D. in chemistry from the University of Texas at Austin in 1965 under the supervision of Joanne Ravel.

== Work ==
=== Academic positions ===
From 1967 to 1968, Wang was a postdoctoral researcher at the Georgetown University School of Medicine. She joined Stanford University in 1969 as a research associate and senior research associate, and then appointed associate professor in 1986, and professor in 1990 of the Department of Pathology Stanford University School of Medicine. Wang was appointed the Klaus-Bensch Professor of Pathology in 2004 and later retired as professor emeritus in 2012.

=== Awards and honors ===
- The K. Bensch Endowed Chair Professorship in Experimental Pathology in 2004
- Fellow of American Association for the Advancement of Science (AAAS) in 2006
- Distinguish Scientist Lecture Recipient of National Institute of Environmental Health Science of National Institutes of Health (NIH) in 2009
- Asian American Faculty Award of Stanford University in 2010.
- Wang was a member of several professional organizations, including the American Society for Biochemistry and Molecular Biology, the American Society for Microbiology, the American Society for Cell Biology, and the American Association for Cancer Research Inc. She had served as the principal investigator of three National Institute of Health/ National Cancer Institute supported programs. She was the director of Tumor Biology postdoctoral training program for MD/PhD fellows of Stanford School of Medicine.
- Wang had served as an editorial board member of several scientific journals and was study section committee member of two National Institute of Health scientific grant reviewing boards from 1997 to 1999. Between 2005-2008, she served on the Board of Scientific Counselors for the National Cancer Institute. In 2006, Wang was elected a fellow of the American Association for the Advancement of Science. She had published more than 100 articles on her research in Nature, Genes & Development, Molecular Cell Biology, Genetics, Molecular Biology of Cell, Journal of Biological Chemistry, Biochemistry, Proceeding National Academic Science. Annual Reviews of Biochemistry, and Encyclopedia of Molecular Medicine.

She authored four U.S. patents:

- 6,008,045, issued 12/28/99 (serial number 07/792,600) with Patent Title: AcHDP or Compositions and Methods for Template-Dependent Enzymatic Synthesis of Nucleic Acid (r-human DNA polymerase alpha expressed in baculovirus).
- U.S. patent: 6,103,473, issued 8/15/00 (divisional of 07/792,600). Patent Title: Drug Screening
- U.S. patent: 6,100,023, issued 8/8/00 (divisional of 07/,792,00). Patent Title: Drug Design Assay
- U.S. patent: 6,670,161, issued 12/30/03 (divisional of 09/157,021, now pat. no. 6,100,023). Patent Title: Compositions and Methods for Template-dependent Enzymatic Synthesis of Nucleic Acid.
