= Keh-Fei Liu =

Physicist

Keh-Fei Frank Liu is a Chinese-born American physicist.

Liu was born in 1947 and graduated from the department of physics at Tunghai University with a Bachelor of Science degree in 1968. He then pursued graduate study at the State University of New York, Stony Brook, where he was advised by Gerald E. Brown. Liu completed his Master of Science degree in 1971, followed by his doctorate in 1975. Liu held an adjunct assistant professorship at the University of California, Los Angeles, between 1979 and 1980, when he joined the University of Kentucky faculty. In 1986, Liu was promoted to a full professorship in 1986. In 1997, Liu was elected a fellow of the American Physical Society "[f]or pioneering work in lattice gauge calculations which checked nuclear models quantitatively".
