= Jaung-Geng Lin =

- 林昭庚
- Born: Taiwan
- Education: China Medical University
- Scientific career
- Fields: Traditional Chinese medicine, acupuncture and moxibustion
- Workplaces: China Medical University; Academia Sinica

Jaung-Geng Lin (Chinese: 林昭庚) is a Taiwanese physician and professor of Traditional Chinese Medicine at China Medical University. The main topics of his research include acupuncture evidence-based medicine, acupuncture analgesia and acupuncture safety.

== Career ==
He graduated from the College of Medicine at China Medical University and holds qualifications as a surgeon, obstetrician-gynecologist, and traditional Chinese medicine doctor in Taiwan.

He is a graduate and Chair Professor at the China Medical University, Taiwan.

In 2022 he was elected to the Academia Sinica.
