= Tang Shui Liu =

Chinese botanist

Tang Shui Liu (Chinese: 劉 棠瑞, 1911–1997), biologist, botanist, and forestry researcher. Born in Anfu County, Jiangxi, China, in 1910, he died in Los Angeles, United States in 1997. Liu made significant contribution through his extensive publications, and he is one of the editors for the inaugural edition of Flora of Taiwan.

== Biography ==
Tang Shui Liu, born on November 30, 1910 (with alternative sources suggesting 1911) in Anfu, Jiangxi, China, died in Los Angeles, California, US in 1997, at the age of 87. His family has resided in Yantian Township for generations. Liu's father, Yu-Feng Liu, and older brother Hsi-Liang Liu, practices traditional Chinese medicine. Liu started his education in a private school before transferring to Yangming Middle School at the age of 15. At the age of 16, He traveled to Tokyo accompanied by Ta-Tsai Lee, a fellow native from his village, where he received tutoring in Japanese, English, mathematics, physics and chemistry. In 1929, Liu was admitted to Tokyo Higher Normal School, and received scholarship from the Jiangxi provincial government. Following his graduation, he was immediately accepted by the Department of Botany, College of Science, Kyoto Imperial University (now Kyoto University) in 1933, and received Bachelor of Science degree in 1936. Liu returned to China upon completing his studies and assumed the position of professor and the director of biology at various colleges and universities in Guangdong and Guangxi.

In 1948, Liu accepted the invitation from Chian-Shan Chen, who was then the curator of the Taiwan Provincial Museum (now the National Taiwan Museum), and traveled to Taiwan to assume the position of a researcher and the head of the botany unit for the museum. At the same time, he also served as a professor at the Department of Botany at both National Taiwan University and Taiwan Provincial Normal University (now National Taiwan Normal University). He later accepted the invitation from Dr. Shih-Liang Chien, who was then the President of National Taiwan University, for a full-time position as a professor in the Department of Forestry, and as a part-time professor in the Department of Botany, as well as the Director of the Department of Forestry from the same institution. He eventually became the Dean of the School of Agriculture in 1972 before leaving in 1977. Besides teaching at National Taiwan University, Liu also served as a professor in the Department of Botany and the Department of Forestry at National Chung Hsing University. While fulfilling his teaching responsibilities, he also continued with his higher education, and by leveraging his research findings, he was awarded the Doctor of Science degree from Tokyo University in 1970. Liu immigrated to the United States after retiring from National Taiwan University in 1982 and died in Los Angeles in 1997

== Studies ==
Liu actively participated in scientific expedition teams composed of members from the academic community (including geology, meteorology, animal, plants, geography, and other scientific fields) while being a researcher for the Taiwan Provincial Museum in 1947. The team conducted botanical investigations and collections at sites in Penghu, Yushang, and Lanyu, with Liu committing his efforts in taxonomic research.

Liu dedicated 50 years of his life to education and academic research, focusing on the botanical taxonomy of plants in Taiwan and southern China. He published 83 academic studies in total.

In 1963, The US Department of Agriculture (USDA) invited Liu to conduct a year-long study on the taxonomy and distribution of the Abies genus in Europe, the US, and Japan. He spent 8 years analyzing and researching the data after returning from the trip and published A Monograph of the Genus Abies (English Monograph). The work not only studied the taxonomy and distribution of the Abies genus in the world but also described cultivation methods and use in the forestry industry. The work received awards from the USDA. Liu applied for a doctoral degree from Tokyo University by leveraging this work and his other research findings and was awarded the Doctor of Science degree.

Liu used Tang Shui Liu in academic publications, but he occasionally used Tung Shui Liu.

== Bibliography ==
Liu served one of the editors for the English version of Flora of Taiwan from 1973 to 1979 and was one of the major contributors。

- Illustrations of Native and introduced Ligneous Plants of Taiwan (Note: [鄭淑芬，2007]，本書為二大冊，介紹了木本植物1,109種，並附上精美形態解剖圖，此乃由陳建鑄、郭秋成等先生耗時數年繪製而成。)
- Cheng Chung Botanical Dictionary (co-authored with Liang-Gong Li)
- Forest Plant Ecology (co-authored with Hong-Jie Su)
- Dendrology (co-authored with Ri-Jing Liao)
- Plant Taxonomy (Note: [鄭淑芬，2007]，原本計畫將涵蓋所有分類群，以最新分類思想及技術，預計出版六分冊(6000頁)的鉅著，但只寫到被子植物的一部份便過世，共計出版本書4冊。)
- A Monograph of the Genus Abies
- A Monograph of the Genus Picea
- List of Economic Plants in Taiwan
- Dendrology
- Taxonomy of Woody Plants
- Flora of Nantou County

A two-volume Dendrology received the Golden Tripod Award from the Government Information Office, Executive Yuan.

== Teaching and mentorship ==
Liu taught courses in dendrology and plant taxonomy at the National Taiwan University, National Taiwan Normal University, and National Chung Hsing University. Many academics in Taiwan, such as Tseng-Chien Huang, Chien-Chang Hsu, Ri-Jing Liao, Hong-Jie Su, Fu-Yuan Lu, Chiu-Cheng Liao, Chern-Hsiung Ou, and Tsan-Iang Chuang studied under his guidance (Note: [鄭淑芬，2007]，鄭淑芬提到(李學勇口述)：「當年僅有(按：指台大植物學研究所)的碩士班學生，如耿煊、趙傳纓、黃增泉、許建昌、莊燦暘、莊清章、黃守先都是劉教授精心培植的臺灣第一代植物分類學家...」。)

Students who were mentored by him have made significant contributions to Taiwan's forestry industry after graduation.

== Other ==
In a documentary conducted by Shu-Fen Cheng on Hsueh-Yung Lee's comments on other plant taxonomist in 2007, he mentioned Liu's views on plant nomenclature: First, he discovered that the “moss plants” taught for many years must be renamed properly. Second, since gymnosperms have “strobili,” he believed that the species should be reclassified as “angiosperms.” Finally, after using the term Aceraceae for more than 40 years, he renamed the Chinese family name to Sapindaceae in volume 4 of his work Plant Taxonomy.
