= Typhoon Lee =

Taiwanese astrophysicist and geochemist

- 李太楓
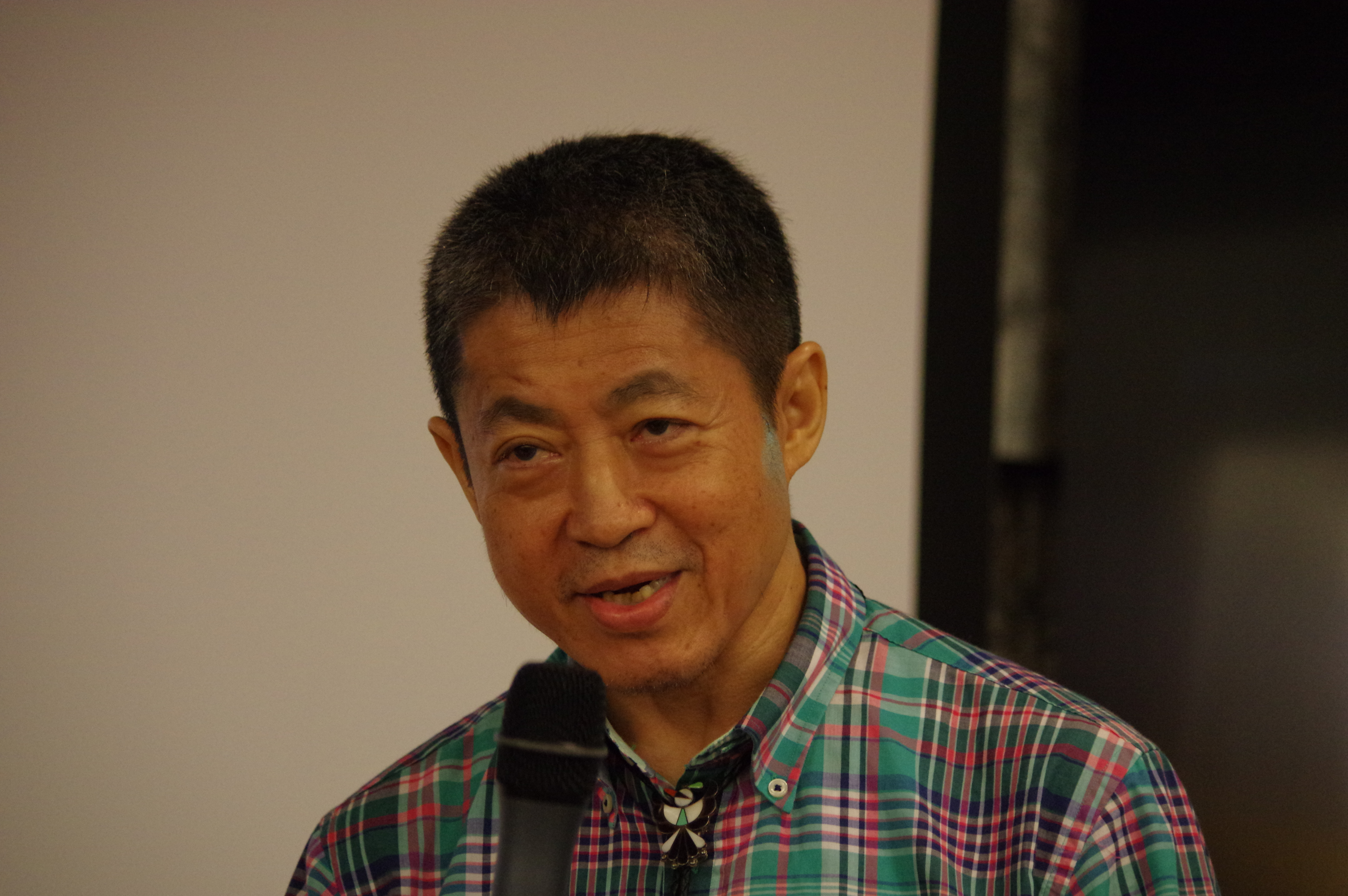
- Born: 1948 (age 77–78)
- Education: National Tsing Hua University (BS); University of Texas at Austin (PhD)
- Website: https://www.asiaa.sinica.edu.tw/people/cv.php?i=typhoon

Typhoon Lee (Chinese: 李太楓; pinyin: Lǐ Tàifēng; born 1948) is a Taiwanese astrophysicist and geochemist at Academia Sinica, Taiwan, where he specializes in isotope geochemistry and nuclear astrophysics.

== Education ==
Lee graduated from National Tsing Hua University with a Bachelor of Science (B.S.) in physics and then earned his Ph.D. in astronomy from the University of Texas at Austin in 1977.

== Career ==
He specializes in key research areas encompassing chondrules, mineralogy, Allende meteorite, chondrites, and astrophysics. Within mineralogy, his focus extends to subjects like seawater, directly linked to disciplines such as coral and Porites. Notably, his work delves into analytical chemistry, stable isotope ratios, and magnesium isotopes within the framework of Allende meteorite investigations.

His honors include the Robert J. Trumpler Award in 1978 from the Astronomical Society of the Pacific, and Outstanding Researcher Awards from the National Science Council in 1985-87 and once again 1988–90.

== Selected publications ==
- X-wind, Refractory IDPs and Cometary Nuclei, 1999, in Proc. IAU Colloquium 168, Astro. Soc. Pacific, San Francisco.
- Proto-stellar Cosmic Rays and Extinct Radioactivities in Meteorites, 1998, Ap. J. 506, 898–912.
- Coral Sr/Ca as a High Precision High Time-Resolution Paleo Thermometer for Sea Surface Temperature: Looking for ENSO Effects in Kuroshio near Taiwan, 1996, Proc. 1995 Nagoya ICBP-PAGES/PEP-II Symposium, 211–216.
- U-Disequilibrium Dating of Corals in Southern Taiwan by Mass Spectrometry, 1993, J. Geol. Soc. China. 36, 57–66.
- Model-Dependent Be-10 Sedimentation Rates for the Taiwan Strait and their Tectonic Significance, 1993, Geology, 21, 423–426.
- First Detection of Fallout Cs-135 and Potential Application of ^{137}Cs/^{135}Cs, 1993, Geochim. Cosmochim. Acta(Letters), 57, 3493–3497.
