= Liaw Yun-fan =

Taiwanese hepatologist

Liaw Yun-fan (Chinese: 廖運範; born 1942) is a Taiwanese hepatologist.

He attended Hsinchu Senior High School and earned his medical degree from the College of Medicine at National Taiwan University in 1967. Liaw completed his residency in internal medicine at National Taiwan University, where he became chief resident. After Liaw's residency, he began teaching as a clinical assistant professor at the National Defense Medical Center. He joined the Chang Gung University Medical College faculty in 1987, having served as director of the affiliated Department of Hepato-Gastroenterology and the Liver Research Unit at the Chang Gung Memorial Hospital since 1976. Liaw was named a member of the Academia Sinica in 2000. That same year, he helped compile a hepatitis B prevention guide for use across Asia after attending the International Liver Congress in Fukuoka, Japan. In 2012, Liaw was appointed distinguished chair professor, and was honored by the European Association for the Study of the Liver as the 2013 recipient of its International Recognition Award.

Liaw has been critical of Pan-Blue Coalition supporters and policies. In 2013, he signed a petition opposing the implementation of the Cross-Strait Service Trade Agreement. In 2017, he lent support to a petition advocating the protection of corals found near Guantang Industrial Park in Taoyuan. Liaw signed a petition in April 2019 calling for William Lai and Tsai Ing-wen, contestants in the 2019 Democratic Progressive Party presidential primary, to join forces and form the party's ticket for the 2020 presidential election. In the 2022 local elections, Liaw and Lee Ming-liang jointly organized a petition supporting Chen Shih-chung's bid for the Taipei mayoralty.
