= Ming-Fa Lin =

Taiwanese theoretical physicist

- 林明發
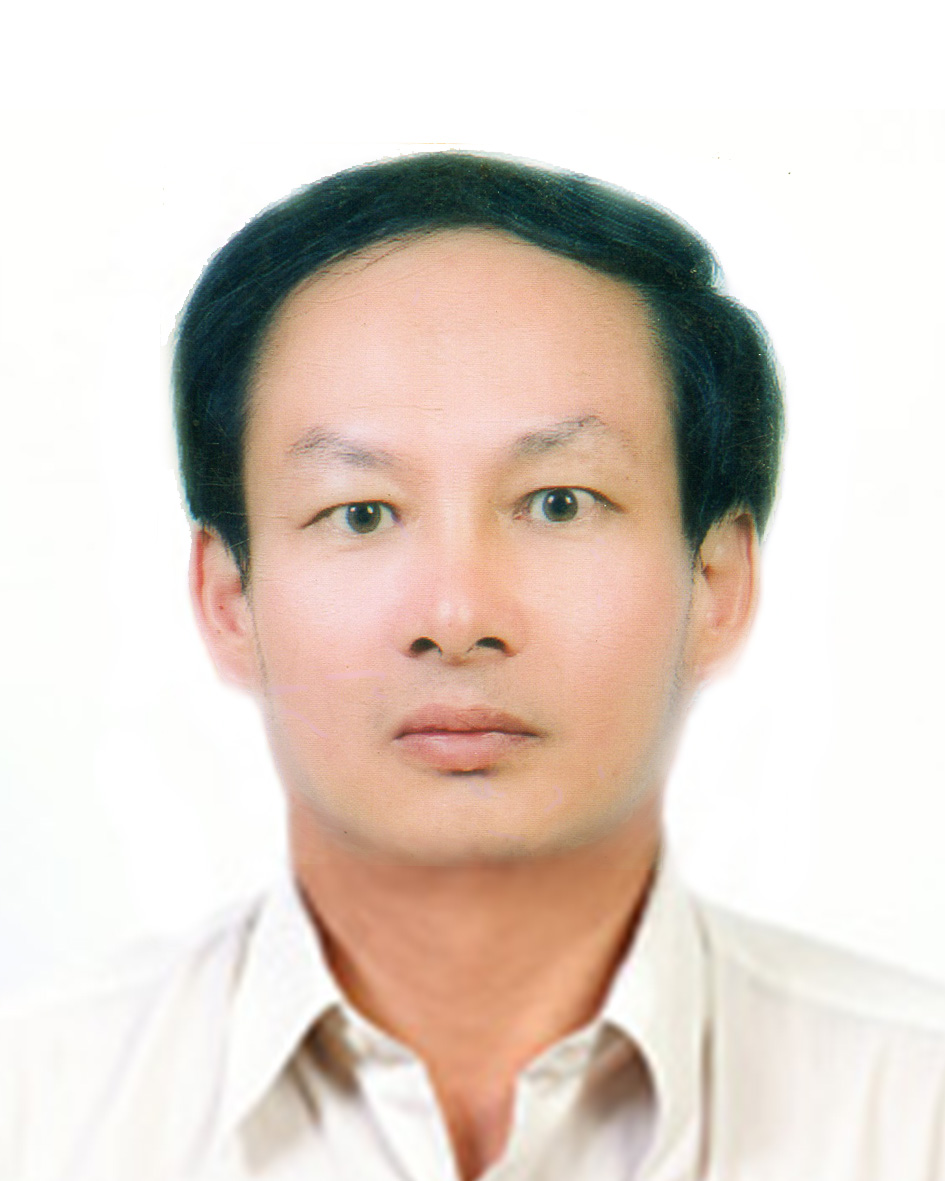
- Born: July 2, 1962; Tainan County, Taiwan
- Died: August 14, 2023 (aged 61); Tainan City, Taiwan
- Education: National Cheng Kung University (BS); National Tsing Hua University (PhD)
- Scientific career
- Fields: Theoretical physics
- Institutions: National Cheng Kung University
- Thesis: Many-Body Effects in Graphite Intercalation Compounds and Graphene Tubules (1993)
- Doctoral advisor: Kenneth Wen-Kai Shung

Ming-Fa Lin (Chinese: 林明發; Pe̍h-ōe-jī: Lîm Bîng-Huat; July 2, 1962 – August 14, 2023) was a Taiwanese theoretical physicist. He was a distinguished professor in the Department of Physics of National Cheng Kung University in Tainan, Taiwan. His main scientific interests focus on the essential properties of carbon-related materials and low-dimensional systems. He presided over more than 10 Ministry of Science and Technology research projects. He published more than 300 peer-reviewed articles and over 10 academic books. His research principles include innovation, uniqueness, diversity, completeness, and generalization.

== Education and career ==
He received a B.S. degree in physics from National Cheng Kung University in 1984. Later he received the M.S., and Ph.D. degrees in physics from National Tsing Hua University (Hsinchu, Taiwan) in 1986 and 1993, respectively.

As a postdoctoral fellow in physics from the National Tsing-Hua University, he stayed until 1995. After three years in the National Chiao Tung University (Hsinchu, Taiwan), 1995–1997, he became a professor in the National Cheng Kung University. M. F. Lin was a member of the American Physical Society, American Chemical Society, Physical Society of Taiwan, and Taiwan Association of University Professors.

== Professional experience ==
- 1986.08 - 1987.07: Lecturer of Physics Teaching and Research Center, Feng Chia University
- 1993.08 - 1995.07: Postdoctoral fellow of Physics, National Tsing Hua University
- 1995.08 - 1997.07: Postdoctoral fellow of Electrophysics, National Chiao Tung University
- 1997.08 - 1998.07: Assistant Professor of Physics, National Cheng Kung University
- 1998.08 - 2001.07: Associate Professor of Physics, National Cheng Kung University
- 2001.08 - 2006.07: Professor of Physics, National Cheng Kung University
- 2006.08 - 2023.08: Distinguished Professor of Physics, National Cheng Kung University

== Research fields ==
Professor Lin has performed research in the fields of solid-state physics, condensed matter physics, materials science, nano science, carbon nanotube, graphene, graphene nanoribbon, carbon-related materials, low-dimensional materials, semiconductor, and energy materials.

== Honors and awards ==
- 1997.08 - 1998.07: Research Award, National Science Council, Taiwan
- 1998.08 - 1999.07: Research Award, National Science Council, Taiwan
- 1999.08 - 2000.07: Research Award, National Science Council, Taiwan
- 2000.08 - 2001.07: Research Award, National Science Council, Taiwan
- 2023.10: Career-long top 2% of the world's top scientists in 2022, Elsevier Data Repository

== Research highlights ==
=== Optical properties of graphene nanoribbons ===
Absorption spectra of monolayer graphene nanoribbons with $N_y = 72$ (a) The zigzag graphene nanoribbons possess an optical selection rule of $\Delta J = odd$. (b) The armchair graphene nanoribbons possess an optical selection rule of $\Delta J = 0$.

In 2000, Lin cooperated with Shyu to calculate the optical properties of graphene nanoribbons numerically. The different selection rules for optical transitions in zigzag and armchair graphene nanoribbons were first reported. In 2007, these results were supplemented by a comparative study of zigzag graphene nanoribbons with single-wall armchair carbon nanotubes by Hsu and Reichl. In 2011, Lin conducted Chung et al. to analyze and report the edge-dependent optical selection rules analytically. In the meantime, Sasaki et al. also reported their theoretical prediction as a confirmation.

The selection rule in zigzag graphene nanoribbons differs from that in armchair graphene nanoribbons. Optical transitions between the edge and bulk states enrich the low-energy region absorption spectrum ($<$ 3 eV) with high-intensity absorption peaks. Analytical derivation of the numerically obtained selection rules was presented in 2011. The selection rule for the incident light polarized longitudinally to the zigzag nanoribbon axis is that $|\Delta J | = |J^c - J^v| = odd$, where $J^c$ and $J^v$ are index number for the conduction and valence energy subbands, respectively. For armchair graphene nanoribbons, the selection rule is $\Delta J = J^c - J^v = 0$.

== Research projects ==
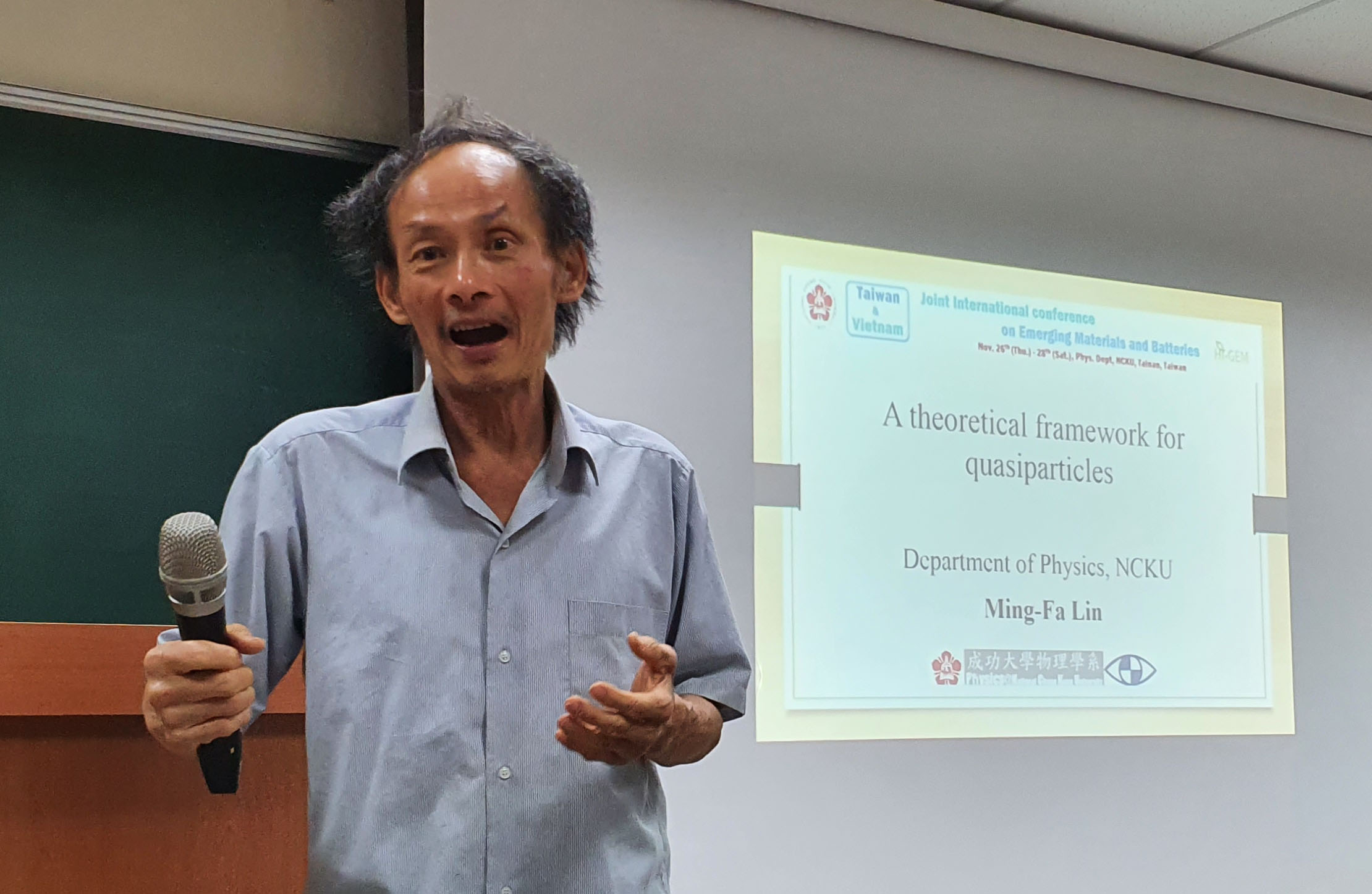
Distinguished Professor Ming-Fa Lin in ICMB-2020 Professor Lin explained his research topic, "A theoretical framework for quasiparticles," at the international conference ICMB-2020.

From 1997 to 2000, Prof. Lin's research projects focused on the theoretical investigation of carbon-based nanostructures, particularly carbon nanotubes and carbon toroids. The studies examined their physical properties, including electronic states, electronic excitations, magnetic properties, and optical properties. Over this period, the research expanded from carbon nanotubes alone to a comparative and integrated analysis of both nanotube and toroidal geometries, highlighting how structural topology influences the electronic and optical behavior of carbon nanomaterials.

From 2000 to 2003, a multi-year project was conducted, focusing on the physical properties of graphite-related systems and two-dimensional modulated electronic systems. From 2003 to 2006, a multi-year project was conducted, focusing on the many-body physical properties of carbon nanotubes.

From 2006 to 2008, research projects focused on the fundamental physical properties of low-dimensional carbon-based systems. The screened exchange self-energy approach is employed to investigate the many-particle properties of single-walled carbon nanotubes (SWCNTs), including Coulomb decay rates, quasiparticle energy dispersions, and carrier distribution functions. The combined effects of electron-electron Coulomb interactions and electron-phonon interactions are shown to induce novel collective excitation modes in SWCNTs and monolayer graphite, warranting detailed theoretical analysis.

The effects of a uniform transverse electric field on single-walled carbon nanotubes (SWCNTs), double-walled carbon nanotubes (DWCNTs), and single-walled BC_{3} nanotubes are also examined, with particular emphasis on changes in electronic structures and optical absorption spectra. In addition, band structures, electronic excitations, and optical properties are calculated for more complex carbon nanotube systems, including deformed and undeformed DWCNTs, carbon nanotube bundles and arrays, SWCNTs coupled with one-dimensional nanographite ribbons, and intercalated SWCNTs.

For few-layer graphite systems and zero-dimensional nanographite ribbons, the study investigates the influence of electric and magnetic fields, both with and without spatial modulation, demonstrating that external fields play a dominant role in determining their essential electronic properties.

From 2009 to 2013, a four-year project was conducted. The research projects focus on several classes of carbon-based and related low-dimensional systems: (1) three-dimensional bulk graphite, (2) few-layer graphene, (3) single-walled carbon nanotubes, (4) one-dimensional hybrid systems composed of graphene nanoribbons and carbon nanotubes, and (5) BC_{3} nanotubes and nanoribbons. Their electronic properties, both in the presence and absence of external fields, are systematically investigated.

For AA-, AB-, and ABC-stacked bulk graphite, a tight-binding model incorporating the Peierls phase is employed to calculate Landau levels and corresponding wave functions. The dependence of these states on uniform perpendicular magnetic fields and interlayer atomic interactions is examined. The resulting Landau-level characteristics are directly reflected in measurable physical quantities, including optical absorption spectra, heat capacity, magnetic susceptibility, and magnetoelectronic excitations.

In few-layer graphene systems, effective electron-electron interactions are evaluated using dielectric functions within the random-phase approximation (RPA). The resulting collective carrier excitations are found to depend on a variety of factors, including uniform and modulated electric or magnetic fields, composite external fields, and carrier doping density.

For single-walled carbon nanotubes, the screened exchange self-energy formalism is applied to analyze Coulomb decay rates, quasiparticle energy bands, and carrier distribution functions arising from many-body interactions. The effects of tube radius, chirality, parallel magnetic fields, and chemical potential are incorporated into the calculations.

In hybrid systems consisting of graphene nanoribbons and carbon nanotubes, interatomic interactions are shown to significantly influence the spatial symmetry of low-energy quasi-Landau levels, thereby strongly affecting magneto-optical excitations. Finally, the geometric and electronic structures of these hybrid systems, as well as BC_{3}-related nanotubes and nanoribbons, are examined in detail using first-principles calculations based on the Vienna Ab initio Simulation Package (VASP).

From 2013 to 2016, the research employs a generalized tight-binding model and electron-electron interaction theory, supplemented by first-principles numerical calculations. The work focuses on carbon-based systems with diverse dimensionalities, including three-dimensional graphite, two-dimensional few-layer and multilayer graphene, one-dimensional graphene nanoribbons, one-dimensional carbon nanotubes, zero- to two-dimensional all-carbon hybrid structures, and zero- to two-dimensional carbon compounds.

These systems are studied under a range of external field conditions, such as uniform electric and magnetic fields, spatially modulated electric and magnetic fields, and composite fields combining modulated fields with uniform magnetic fields. The investigations address a wide range of physical properties, including geometric structures, electronic band structures, optical spectra, electronic excitations, Coulomb decay rates, and magnetic properties, providing a comprehensive theoretical description of carbon-related materials across multiple length scales.

From 2016 to 2019, the projects developed a generalized tight-binding model to investigate the fundamental properties of two-dimensional group-IV systems (carbon (C), silicon (Si), germanium (Ge), tin (Sn), lead (Pb)), with particular emphasis on unique quantization phenomena. The approach simultaneously considers full orbital bonding, spin-orbit coupling, electron-electron interactions, and external electric and magnetic fields. Key focuses include electronic properties, optical spectra, and Coulomb excitations and de-excitations, with detailed analysis of their dependence on field strength, carrier density, stacking configuration, number of layers, and dimensionality. Systematic studies of magnetically quantized properties are ongoing.

Complementary first-principles calculations are employed to predict free carrier densities, tunable energy gaps, and stable nanostructures of adatoms in two-dimensional compounds, as well as hopping parameters in intrinsic systems. The effects of adatoms' distribution and concentration, buffer layers, and substrates are analyzed. The study further examines orbital hybridizations in various chemical bonds to explain significant changes in geometric structures and electronic properties, as evidenced by atom-dominated energy bands, charge distributions and their variations, and orbital-projected densities of states.

From 2019 to 2022, a three-year project was conducted. Theoretical models have been further developed and refined to investigate the fundamental properties of emerging two-dimensional (2D) materials, including group-IV and group-V elements and their related compounds. The study employs a variety of approaches: the generalized tight-binding model for analyzing novel magnetic quantization, the dynamic and static Kubo formulas for examining magneto-optical selection rules and Hall conductivities, the layer-dependent random-phase approximation for characterizing Coulomb excitations, and modified Matsubara Green's functions for evaluating inelastic electron-electron scattering rates.

The analyses consider multiple critical factors simultaneously, including geometric symmetries, planar and curved surfaces, doping effects, chemisorption, intra- and interlayer hopping integrals, spin-orbit couplings, external electric and magnetic fields, and intra- and interlayer Coulomb interactions. Particular attention is given to single- and multi-orbital hybridizations and intrinsic spin configurations, which are examined within a first-principles computational framework. The research provides concise chemical and physical interpretations to explain observed phenomena and includes detailed comparisons with high-resolution experimental measurements.

From 2022 to 2024, a two-year project was conducted. This project is a fundamental physics research program that explores the geometric, electronic, and phonon structures of novel layered materials and green energy materials, and is expected to have a positive impact on the development of basic science. The target materials studied cover the semiconductor and green energy industries and are indispensable for the future of electronics and sustainable industries. This fundamental research is expected to attract more forward-looking innovations, benefiting related industries and society.

=== Principal investigator (PI) ===
The following is a list of projects for which Prof. Lin serves as the Principal Investigator (PI).

1. 1997.11 - 1998.07: Physical Properties of Carbon Nanotubes (I)
2. 1998.08 - 1999.07: Physical Properties of Carbon Toroids (I)
3. 1999.08 - 2000.07: Physical Properties of Carbon Toroids and Carbon Nanotubes (III)
4. 2000.08 - 2001.07: Physical Properties of Graphite-Related Systems and Two-Dimensional Modulated Electronic Systems (I)
5. 2001.08 - 2002.07: Physical Properties of Graphite-Related Systems and Two-Dimensional Modulated Electronic Systems (II)
6. 2002.08 - 2003.07: Physical Properties of Graphite-Related Systems and Two-Dimensional Modulated Electronic Systems (III)
7. 2003.08 - 2004.07: Many-Body Physical Properties of Carbon Nanotubes (I)
8. 2004.08 - 2005.07: Many-Body Physical Properties of Carbon Nanotubes (II)
9. 2005.08 - 2006.07: Many-Body Physical Properties of Carbon Nanotubes (III)
10. 2006.08 - 2007.07: Physical Properties of Low-Dimensional Carbon-Related Systems (I)
11. 2008.08 - 2009.07: Physical Properties of Low-Dimensional Carbon-Related Systems (II)
12. 2007.08 - 2008.07: Physical Properties of Low-Dimensional Carbon-Related Systems (III)
13. 2009.08 - 2010.07: Electronic Properties of Layered Systems in the Presence of External Fields (I)
14. 2010.08 - 2011.07: Electronic Properties of Layered Systems in the Presence of External Fields (II)
15. 2011.08 - 2012.07: Electronic Properties of Layered Systems in the Presence of External Fields (III)
16. 2012.08 - 2013.07: Electronic Properties of Layered Systems in the Presence of External Fields (IV)
17. 2013.08 - 2014.07: Physical Properties of Graphene Systems (I)
18. 2014.08 - 2015.07: Physical Properties of Graphene Systems (II)
19. 2015.08 - 2016.07: Physical Properties of Graphene Systems (III)
20. 2016.08 - 2017.07: Essential Properties of IV-Group 2D Systems (I)
21. 2017.08 - 2018.07: Essential Properties of IV-Group 2D Systems (II)
22. 2018.08 - 2019.07: Essential Properties of IV-Group 2D Systems (III)
23. 2019.08 - 2020.07: Theoretical Frameworks for Essential Properties of Layered Systems (I)
24. 2020.08 - 2021.07: Theoretical Frameworks for Essential Properties of Layered Systems (II)
25. 2021.08 - 2022.07: Theoretical Frameworks for Essential Properties of Layered Systems (III)
26. 2022.08 - 2023.07: The Basic Science under the Quasi-Particle Framework (I)
27. 2023.08 - 2024.07: The Basic Science under the Quasi-Particle Framework (II)

=== Co-PI ===
The following is a list of projects for which Prof. Lin serves as the Co-Principal Investigator (Co-PI).

1. 2014.08 - 2015.07: MBE Growth, Electronic, Spintronic and Optical Studies on Topological Insulator Films and Advanced Applications (I)
2. 2015.08 - 2016.07: MBE Growth, Electronic, Spintronic and Optical Studies on Topological Insulator Films and Advanced Applications (II)
3. 2016.08 - 2017.07: MBE Growth, Electronic, Spintronic and Optical Studies on Topological Insulator Films and Advanced Applications (III)

== Publications ==
=== Regular articles ===
More than 300 peer-reviewed articles are published and listed in abstract and citation databases.

1. Ming-Fa Lin's publications indexed by the Scopus bibliographic database. (subscription required)
2. Ming-Fa Lin publications indexed by Google Scholar

=== Books ===
Lin's book publications primarily address theoretical condensed-matter physics and materials science, with a particular focus on low-dimensional and graphene-related systems. His works systematically examine the electronic, optical, magnetic, and quasiparticle properties of two-dimensional and layered materials, including graphene, graphite, silicene, germanene, and their nanostructures. Many of these volumes emphasize the roles of geometric structure, chemical bonding, external fields, and quantization effects in determining material properties.

A recurring theme in Lin's books is many-body and quasiparticle physics, covering topics such as Coulomb excitations, decay processes, and magnetoelectric phenomena, often investigated using first-principles and theoretical modeling approaches. These studies contribute to the fundamental understanding of emerging quantum and layered materials.

In addition to basic theory, Lin authored and edited several books on energy storage and conversion materials, with emphasis on lithium-ion batteries, battery components, and solar cell materials. These works connect fundamental physicochemical principles with applications in energy technology.

Collectively, his books represent a substantial contribution to the literature on carbon-related materials, low-dimensional systems, and energy materials, and are widely used as reference works in condensed-matter physics and materials research.

==== Book list ====
1. Optical Properties of Graphene in Magnetic and Electric Fields
2. Theory of Magnetoelectric Properties of 2D Systems
3. Structure- and Adatom-Enriched Essential Properties of Graphene Nanoribbons
4. Handbook of Green Energy Materials
5. Coulomb Excitations and Decays in Graphene-Related Systems
6. Diverse Quantization Phenomena in Layered Materials
7. Geometric and Electronic Properties of Graphene-Related Systems: Chemical Bonding Schemes
8. Silicene-Based Layered Materials
9. Electronic and Optical Properties of Graphite-Related Systems
10. Lithium-Ion Batteries and Solar Cells: Physical, Chemical, and Materials Properties
11. Rich Quasiparticle Properties of Low Dimensional Systems
12. First-Principles Calculations for Cathode, Electrolyte and Anode Battery Materials
13. Lithium-Related Batteries: Advances and Challenges
14. Diverse Quasiparticle Properties of Emerging Materials: First-Principles Simulations
15. Energy Storage and Conversion Materials: Properties, Methods, and Applications
16. Fundamental Physicochemical Properties of Germanene-related Materials: A Theoretical Perspective
17. Rich Quasiparticle Properties in Layered Graphene-Related Systems
18. Chemical Modifications of Graphene-Like Materials

=== Review articles ===
1. Magneto-electronic properties of multilayer graphenes
2. Electronic and optical properties of graphene nanoribbons in external fields
