= National Center for Theoretical Sciences, Physics =

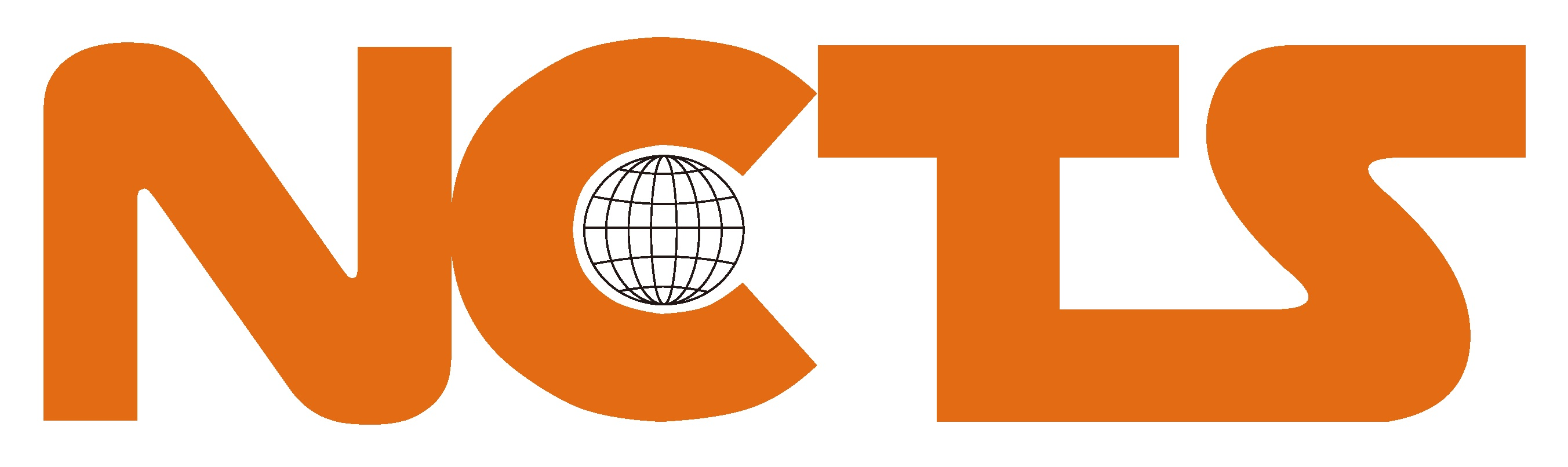
- Type: Research Institution
- Established: 1997, on Campus of National Tsing Hua University, Hsinchu City, Taiwan. The headquarters is relocated to National Taiwan University, Taipei in 2021.
- Director: Guang-Yu Guo
- Location: Taipei, Taiwan
- Website: http://www.phys.ncts.ntu.edu.tw/

National Center for Theoretical Sciences (NCTS) in Taiwan was established on August 1, 1997 and fully funded by the National Science Council (NSC), which is reorganized and became Ministry of Science and Technology (Taiwan) (MoST) in 2014, with strong endorsement from some of the most eminent scholars, including Yang Chen-Ning and Shing-Tung Yau. It is a national research center with the goal to contribute to the advancement of frontier research, and to promote interdisciplinary and international research cooperation in theoretical sciences.

NCTS was set up with a center in Theoretical Physics and one in Mathematics. For the first 18 years, NCTS was located on the campus of the National Tsing Hua University, Hsinchu. Since 2015, NCTS Mathematics has been relocated to the National Taiwan University, Taipei. NCTS Physics and NCTS Mathematics operate mostly independently to serve their separate communities and cooperate on some of their national programs and strategies. Tung-Mow Yan was the founder director of NCTS.

Previous directors of the Physics Division were Tung-Mow Yan, Ting-Kuo Lee, Darwin Chang, Tu-Nan Chang, Hsiang-Nan Li, Chung-Yu Mou, Ling-Fong Li, Xiao-Gang He, and Chong-Sun Chu. The current director is Guang-Yu Guo.

== Mission ==
NCTS Physics aims to act as a national multidisciplinary facility and platform envision to contribute to the advancement of frontier research in physics. Its academic programs and activities are operated with the goals: to act as an effective platform to stimulate and to enhance the interaction and collaboration among researchers; to empower talented students and postdoctoral researchers to make significant contributions in the frontier of research subjects; to serve as an efficacious channel to network the home researchers with other scholars and preeminent institutions abroad; and to explore new frontiers in physics research and innovation, and to enhance the extent and breadth of interdisciplinary researches as well as the collaboration with scientists in the experimental fields.

== Research ==
Scientists at NCTS work on the following major research subjects and research topics:

High Energy Phenomenology, String and Gravity: dark matter, dark energy, nature of electroweak symmetry breaking, neutrino physics, collider physics, holographic and quantum informatic property of gravity, scattering amplitudes, inflationary cosmology, quantum geometry and branes, exact results in QFT.

Condensed Matter Physics: first principle calculations of new quantum materials, topological materials, spintronics, strongly correlated system, DMRG and tensor network, emergent symmetry, quantum transport.

Atomic, Molecular and Optical Physics: many-body dynamics of ultracold atoms, long-range effects, light-atom interaction and quantum control, quantum steering and quantum information.

Soft Matters, Bio-Physics and Complex Systems: complex and biological network, complex dynamics and chaos, nonequilibrium statistical physics of driven/active soft matter, interplay of proliferation, utilization and feedback regulations in complex interacting system.

== Programs ==
NCTS operates a number of academic programs in order to engage researchers in creative scientific activities. Interdisciplinary interactions are encouraged. Programs include the NCTS Topic Programs whose purpose is to encourage collaboration and to foster the generation of new ideas and initiatives for breakthrough; Rapid Response Workshop whose purpose is to respond actively and quickly to any sudden development of the field which has a significant potential of impact; NCTS Distinguished Lecturer whose objective is to bring distinguished scholars to NCTS to give a lecture or lecture series on a specific topic of research or a topic of general interest. In addition, we have an active visitor program with both international and domestic scientists.

NCTS scientists are also involved in advancing a number of Thematic Research, Interdisciplinary Research and Experimental Collaboration Group. These groups have been the breeding ground for a number of PhD students and postdoctoral researchers who have gone on for a successful career in physics.

== Some of the representative programs ==
NCTS Annual Theory Meeting on Particles, Strings and Cosmology, Dec 9-12, 2015

Forum on Future of High Energy Physics, Dec 11, 2015

Israel-Taiwan Workshop on Quantum Optics, Quantum Electronics, and Quantum Matters, Dec 14-15, 2015

NCTS Annual Theory Meeting 2015: Condensed Matter Physics, Dec 16-19

Japan-Taiwan workshop on KAGRA, Dec 23, 2015

The 1st KEK-KIAS-NCTS Joint Workshop on Particle Physics Phenomenology, May 26-28, 2016

Public lecture by Prof. Jerome Friedman (1990 Nobel laureate in Physics), July 12, 2016

The 13th Taiwan International Symposium on Statistical Physics and Complex Systems (StatPhys-Taiwan-2016), Sep 6-8, 2016

The 19th Asian Workshop on First-Principles: Electronic Structure Calculations (ASIAN-19), Oct 31-Nov 2, 2016

9th Taiwan String Workshop, Nov 11-13, 2016

NCTS distinguished lecture, Nov 22-24,2016

NCTS Annual Theory Meeting 2016: Particles, Cosmology and String, Dec 06-09, 2016

NCTS Annual Theory Meeting 2016: Quantum Simulations and Numerical Studies in Many Bodies Physics, Dec 09-11, 2016

UNESCO talk on CERN, Apr 19, 2017

Searching for – and finding! Gravitational waves, May 24,2017

Public talks by Prof. Shing-Tung Yau and Prof.Takaaki Kajita, Aug 2, 2017

Symposium on Frontiers in Physics, Aug 3, 2017
