= Hung Chi-sheng =

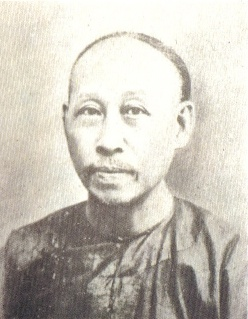
Portrait of Hung Chi-sheng.

Hung Chi-sheng (Chinese: 洪棄生; December 17, 1866 – 1928) was an important classical scholar, poet, and historian in Taiwan during the late Qing Dynasty and Japanese rule. He wrote works such as Ji He Zhai Poetry Collection (寄鶴齋詩矕), Ji He Zhai Essay Collection (寄鶴齋文矕), Taiwan War Chronicles (臺灣戰紀), and Zhongdong War Chronicles (中東戰紀).

== Biography ==
With ancestors from Nan'an, Fukien in China, Hung was a native of Lukang, Changhua in Taiwan.

During the Qing dynasty in Taiwan, Hong took part in the Imperial Examination and was promoted to the rank of xiucai in 1889. After Japan took control of Taiwan in November 1895, he withdrew from official examinations and devoted himself to poetry and classical Chinese literature. Depicting Taiwan's history and society in his poetry and prose, Hung expressed his opposition to Japanese rule. With his incisive writing style, he meticulously documented the Japanese rule of Taiwan, the resistance of volunteer armies against Japan, and the Japanese administration, influencing public opinion at the time.

He founded a classical poetry society, the Lu Yuan Poetry Society. By reciting poems, he expressed his thoughts on his lost homeland and the continuation of Han culture, while subtly harboring anti-Japanese sentiments. In 1919, he organized the "Taiwan Literary Society" with Taiwanese classical poets and literary figures. He also helped publish Taiwan's first classical Chinese magazine, the Taiwan Literary Arts Magazine (臺灣文藝叢誌).

=== Names ===
Hung had various names. He was listed in his family genealogy as Pan-kuei (攀桂), called I-chih (一枝) by the elders, with a courtesy name of Yueh-chiao (月樵). After the cession of Taiwan to Japan, he changed his name to Hsu (繻), courtesy name Chi-sheng (棄生), and went with his courtesy name. Hung Chi-sheng used the official name Hung Yueh-yao (洪曰堯) on his seal, and also had the pen names Hung Chi-fu (洪棄父) and Hung Chi-sheng Fu (洪棄生父).

== Works ==
In Taiwanese classical literature, Hung Chi-Sheng was adept at writing in various literary genres with rich and substantial content, focusing on social realism. His works also include historical commentaries, political discourses, travelogues, historical reflections, biographies, and scientific discussions. His writings truly reflect the times in which he lived. His writings are collected in The Posthumous Works of Hung Chi-sheng (洪棄生先生遺書), edited by Xu Duanfu (胥端甫). Before Japanese rule, his works were gentle and refined, elegant and simple. During the Japanese rule, however, they were transformed into expressions of acute and bleak bitterness, revealing his inner changes and thoughts, especially his longing for his homeland and his resentment of foreign rule.
