= Ru-Chih Chow Huang =

Chinese-American biochemist (1932–2026)

Ru-Chih Chow Huang (Chinese: 黃周汝吉; pinyin: Huáng Zhōu Rǔjí; April 2, 1932 – May 31, 2026) was a Taiwanese-American biology professor at Johns Hopkins University. She was a biochemist who worked with James F. Bonner and Doug Fambrough to characterize and discern functions for nuclear histones in the early 1960s when the field lacked a consensus on types and functions of individual histone proteins. Later she made discoveries about the molecular biology of cancer and of viral gene regulation.

== Early life and education ==
Ru-Chih Chow was born April 2, 1932, in Nanjing, Jiangsu, China. She moved to the US in 1954. She was inspired to become a scientist after reading a biography of Marie Curie. She received a B.S. from National Taiwan University in 1953, a M.S. from Virginia Tech in 1956, and her Ph.D. from Ohio State University in 1960. She was a postdoctoral fellow with James F. Bonner at California Institute of Technology from 1960 to 1965.

== Academic and research career ==
Ru-Chih Chow Huang joined the faculty at Johns Hopkins University in 1971. She was the first female science professor hired there. She was an Assistant Professor from 1965 to 1971, an Associate Professor from 1971 to 1975, and a Professor since 1975. Her title was McElroy Honorary Research Professor in 2018. She served as Chairman of a Gordon Research Conference in 1980, Chairman of the Board of Science Counselors of the National Institute on Aging, National Institutes of Health, from 1980 to 1984, a member of the Board of Directors of the Institute of Molecular Biology, Taiwan from 1987 to 1988, and a member of the Science Advisory Board of the National Cancer Institute.

In 1962, Huang and James Bonner published their finding that histone suppresses chromosomal RNA synthesis. That paper became a Citation Classic. In the interview recognizing her paper as a Citation Classic, Huang said, "The work ... was done when little was known about the molecular approach to gene expression. The term chromatin as an interphase state of chromosome was beginning to be accepted as a biochemical working usage. The isolation and purification of chromatin was still approached with more art than science, until the pea embryo was chosen." Bonner commented about the state of histone knowledge in the early 1960s when Huang began to work in his laboratory in a biographical article published in 1994, saying, "Study of the literature on histones made it clear that not much was known about how many kinds of histones there were or whether there were different histones in different creatures or in different specialized cells. Nobody knew what histones were for and no one had studied histones in plants." Bonner got funding from NSF and other places to organize a conference on histones, trying to include all known histone researchers. After the conference he summarized the overview they were left with as chaotic. Estimates of the number of histone types ranged up into the thousands and there was no consensus about homology of histones between different species or even between different cells within one species.

Huang showed that histone proteins inhibited transcription of pea embryo and calf thymus DNA and worked out repeatable methods for studying individual histones while she was a postdoctoral fellow with Bonner. Bonner's laboratory later purified and sequenced each histone type from peas in collaboration with Emil Smith. In the years that followed at Johns Hopkins, her research focused upon gene regulation in cancer, regulation of viral gene expression, expression of viral genome fragments in mammalian genomes, and molecular biology of aging cells.

He was co-founder and Chief Scientific Advisor of Erimos Pharmacueticals, LLC of Houston, TX. This firm is developing her recently discovered mutation-insensitive antiviral and anticancer compounds which are derivatives of the plant lignan NDGA. This work was somewhat controversial when she first took it up.

== Personal life and death ==
Ru-Chih Chow married Pien Chien Huang on June 10, 1956. In an article in 2001, her son is quoted about her wedding day at Virginia Tech as follows, '"The same day she received her degree, she changed into a wedding dress in a Shell gas station in Blacksburg, Va., and they got married in the university president's office, with just the president and two witnesses,"said Suber Huang."They knew literally no one in this country. But they survived through their wit, intelligence and drive."' She died in Baltimore on May 31, 2026, at the age of 94.

== Awards ==
- 2000, The World Journal Most Notable 100 North American Chinese of the Century
