= Roche Institute of Molecular Biology =

Research institute in Nutley, New Jersey, US

Coordinates: 40.8321°N 74.1540°W

The Roche Institute of Molecular Biology was created on July 14, 1967 when John Burns, then the vice president of research at Hoffman-La Roche, persuaded biochemist Sidney Udenfriend to leave the National Institutes of Health and help him create a basic science institute at the Hoffman-La Roche Nutley, New Jersey, facility. It lasted for 28 years and was associated with a number of well-known and well-regarded scientists. At one time, it was one of the largest post-doctoral training programs funded by industry with approximately 70 fellows. It was one of the first examples of a successful relationship between a basic biological research institute and biomedical company. Notable discoveries include Abuscreen, a product for detecting drug abuse, and Aferon, a recombinant alpha-interferon. Udenfriend claims that the decision of Roche to close the institute was despite the fact that the institute had been producing useful research for the company, and was very highly ranked in terms of independent research institutes. He does note that the scientists leaving the institute were in high demand and were given generous leave packages from Roche, including personal leave salaries, bridging grants and the allowance to keep all equipment in the laboratory. The building which formerly housed the Roche Institute of Molecular Biology now is the location of the Hackensack Meridian Health's Center for Discovery and Innovation.

== Notable scientists ==
- Anna Marie Skalka
- Herbert Weissbach
- Nahum Sonenberg, post doctoral fellow
- Sidney Udenfriend, Founding Director
- Aaron Shatkin
- H. Ronald Kaback
