= Michelle Lampl =

American academic and author

- Title: Charles Howard Candler Professor in Human Health; Samuel Candler Dobbs Professor in Anthropology

Academic background
- Education: B.A. Ph.D., Anthropology; M.D.
- Alma mater: University of Pennsylvania

Academic work
- Institutions: Emory University

Michelle Lampl is an American physician, scientist, academic, and author. She is a distinguished professor and the Director of Emory University’s Center for the Study of Human Health. She is also the co-director of the Emory-Georgia Tech Predictive Health Institute.

Lampl is internationally recognized for her work identifying normal human growth to be a pattern of saltation and stasis. Her research prompted a paradigm shift in the fundamental understanding of normal growth biology and launched further research into the mechanisms that control the sudden growth bursts experienced by healthy infants and developing children. Lampl has written and edited four books and over 130 scientific articles. Her work is featured in the 2020 Netflix documentary series Babies.

She was elected a Fellow of the American Association for the Advancement of Science in 2010.

== Education ==
Lampl earned a bachelor's degree and a doctorate in Anthropology from the University of Pennsylvania, Philadelphia. She earned her Doctor of Medicine degree from the Perelman School of Medicine.

== Career ==
On completing her Ph.D., Lampl began lecturing at the University of Pennsylvania, Rutgers University, and Princeton University before pursuing her medical degree. In 1994, she joined Emory University as an Assistant Professor in the Department of Anthropology and was advanced to Associate Professor in 1998, Full Professor in 2005, and was named the Samuel Candler Dobbs Professor of Anthropology in 2006. Lampl was awarded the Emory Williams Teaching Award in 2003 and the University Exemplary Teacher award in 2018.

Lampl was appointed co-director of the Emory University Predictive Health and Society Strategic Initiative in 2005, adding responsibility as Associate Director of the Center for Health Discovery and Well-Being in 2007. She has been the co-director of Emory University/Georgia Institute of Technology Predictive Health Institute since its inception in 2007.

In 2011, Lampl became the founding director of the Emory Center for the Study of Human Health, where she created educational programs that integrate university-wide faculty to teach and award degrees in human health, predictive health, nutrition science, and a collaborative degree program with the Goizueta Business School in Health Innovation. In 2018 she was endowed the Charles Howard Candler Professorship of Human Health.

== Research and work ==
=== Saltation and stasis processes in human growth ===
Lampl's primary research focus is the process of normal human growth and the physiological basis of health, from the first cell onwards. Lampl discovered that children grow by saltation and stasis, a process characterized by sudden jumps (saltare, Lat) in size abruptly interrupting days of unchanging size. Her work documented that more than 90% of the time healthy infants and children are not growing at all, a finding detected by measuring babies daily. Increasing size was found to occur as bones suddenly elongate and propel a baby’s length and child’s height by as much as a centimeter in one day, after not growing for days to weeks in infancy, and weeks to months among children and adolescents. Saltatory growth is a paradigm change in the understanding of normal growth with significant health implications.

Lampl collaborated with Michael Johnson to develop mathematical approaches to investigate and quantify discontinuous vs pulsatile biological signals. Their work initiated mathematical interrogation of the saltation and stasis model of growth in humans, permitting statistical comparisons between different biological models of growth by formal goodness-of-fit comparisons between continuous, pulsatile and discontinuous processes. Collaboration with Norman Wilsman and his team led to the identification of the cellular basis for saltatory bone elongation.

=== Fetal growth ===
Humans begin life as a single cell and grow in size and complexity into a functional body over the course of nine months. Lampl’s studies employing ultrasound images demonstrated the challenge for the developing fetus to bring together both the architectural elements and energy resources to build the new body. Recognizing that by the time of birth some organs have completed their development (e.g., the kidneys and heart), while others remain to be established (aspects of the immune system), Lampl investigated specific influences on growth patterns and the importance of individual variability. This work led to a collaboration with David Barker and the emerging science of developmental origins of health and disease (DOHaD).

== Publications ==
=== Books ===
- It’s Your Health (2015)

=== Selected articles ===
- Lampl, M., Johnston, F. E., & Malcolm, L. A. (1978). The effects of protein supplementation on the growth and skeletal maturation of New Guinean school children. Annals of Human Biology, 5(3), 219–227.
- Lampl, M., Veldhuis, J., & Johnson, M. (1992). Saltation and stasis: a model of human growth. Science, 258(5083), 801–803.
- Lampl, M., & Johnston, F. E. (1996). Problems in the aging of skeletal juveniles: Perspectives from maturation assessments of living children. American Journal of Physical Anthropology, 101(3), 345–355.
- Lampl, M., & Jeanty, P. (2003). Timing is everything: A reconsideration of fetal growth velocity patterns identifies the importance of individual and sex differences. American Journal of Human Biology, 15(5), 667–680.
- Lampl, M., Kuzawa, C. W., & Jeanty, P. (2003). Prenatal smoke exposure alters growth in limb proportions and head shape in the midgestation human fetus. American Journal of Human Biology, 15(4), 533–546.
- Lampl, M., & Jeanty, P. (2004). Exposure to maternal diabetes is associated with altered fetal growth patterns: A hypothesis regarding metabolic allocation to growth under hyperglycemic-hypoxemic conditions. American Journal of Human Biology, 16(3), 237–263.
- Lampl, M., Gotsch, F., Kusanovic, J. P., Gomez, R., Nien, J. K., Frongillo, E. A., & Romero, R. (2009). Sex differences in fetal growth responses to maternal height and weight. American Journal of Human Biology, 22(4), 431–443.
- Lampl M., Johnson, M.L. (2011). Infant growth in length follows prolonged sleep and increased naps. Sleep 34(5), 641-650.
- Thompson, A. L., Monteagudo-Mera, A., Cadenas, M. B., Lampl, M. L., & Azcarate-Peril, M. A. (2015). Milk- and solid-feeding practices and daycare attendance are associated with differences in bacterial diversity, predominant communities, and metabolic and immune function of the infant gut microbiome. Frontiers in Cellular and Infection Microbiology, 5.
