= Robert F. Siliciano =

- Education: Princeton University; Johns Hopkins University School of Medicine
- Known for: HIV research
- Scientific career
- Workplaces: Johns Hopkins University School of Medicine
- Doctoral students: Ya-Chi Ho

Robert F. Siliciano is a professor of medicine at the Johns Hopkins University School of Medicine and an investigator with the Howard Hughes Medical Institute. Siliciano (sill-ih-CAH-noh) has a joint appointment in the Department of Molecular Biology and Genetics at Johns Hopkins. Siliciano researches the mechanisms by which the human immunodeficiency virus (HIV) remains latent in the human body.

== Training and career ==
Siliciano had a childhood interest in chemistry fostered by his mother Ann, a professor of physiology at Elmira College, and studied chemistry as an undergraduate at Princeton University. He then studied medicine and immunology at Johns Hopkins, earning both MD and PhD degrees. Siliciano continued his training in immunology with Ellis Reinherz at Harvard University, investigating the response of CD4-positive T-cells to antigens.

Siliciano is a professor of medicine at the Johns Hopkins School of Medicine and a Howard Hughes Medical Institute (HHMI) investigator.

== Research ==
The problem of HIV latency is a focus of Siliciano's research. When HIV integrates into the genome of a host cell but remains transcriptionally silent in a state known as "latency," the immune system is unable to detect and destroy the infected cell and its virus. In 1995, Siliciano's lab provided the first demonstration that latently infected cells are present in persons living with HIV. They developed the methods that are widely used to study this reservoir. Working together with his wife Janet Siliciano, he demonstrated that the latent reservoir decays so slowly that lifetime persistence of HIV is guaranteed even in people taking effective combinations of antiretroviral drugs. Because the latent reservoir is the major barrier to curing HIV infection, it is subject of an intense international research effort. Antiretroviral drugs are highly effective at controlling virus replication, but they also have several drawbacks. Some people experience side effects when taking these medications, and if treatment is interrupted, HIV can emerge from this latent reservoir and begin replicating and spreading again. Therefore, HIV treatment must be continued for life.

== Honors and awards ==
- Doris Duke Charitable Foundation Distinguished Clinical Scientist Award
- HIV DART Achievement Award in HIV Therapeutics
- W. Barry Wood Jr. Award
- International Association of Physicians in AIDS Care Award
- Member, National Academy of Science
- Member, National Academy of Medicine
- Member, American Academy of Arts and Sciences
