= Ya-Chi Ho =

Taiwanese infectious disease researcher

- Education: National Cheng Kung University (MD); National Taiwan University (MS); Johns Hopkins University (PhD)
- Scientific career
- Fields: Virology
- Institutions: Yale University
- Thesis: Replication-Competent Non-Induced Proviruses in the Latent Reservoir Increase Barrier to HIV-1 Cure (2013)
- Doctoral advisor: Robert F. Siliciano
- Website: Research website

Ya-Chi Ho is a Taiwanese infectious disease researcher. She is an associate professor of microbial pathogenesis and medicine at Yale University. Her research centers on the interaction between HIV and the host's immune system with the ultimate goal of curing HIV/AIDS.

== Education and early career ==
Ho received her Doctor of Medicine degree at National Cheng Kung University in Taiwan in 2002. She performed her residency training in Internal Medicine before becoming a clinical fellow in infectious diseases. During her residency, she was among the first group of physicians to treat SARS-infected patients at the National Taiwan University Hospital. She then received her Master of Science degree in Clinical Medicine from National Taiwan University before moving to the United States to pursue her doctorate degree at Johns Hopkins School of Medicine. Her graduate work was supported in part by an International Student Research Fellowship awarded by the Howard Hughes Medical Institute.

At Johns Hopkins, she worked in the laboratory of Robert F. Siliciano studying the human immunodeficiency virus's (HIV) interactions with the CD4+ T cells the virus targets and infects. HIV is a retrovirus, which means it is an RNA virus that inserts a copy of itself in the genome of the T cells it infects; the integrated virus is known as a provirus. Ho worked to characterize the subset of HIV proviruses that remain in a dormant state within resting T cells, not producing virus particles; this subset is known as the latent reservoir. When host T cells are activated, the latent provirus can become induced to release active virus, though the vast majority of them do not due to mutation events while incorporated in the host genome. As a result, the latent reservoir has largely been thought to be defective. Using a combination of molecular and genetic techniques, however, Ho found that the latent HIV provirus reservoir persists at much higher levels than previously believed. Her finding presents an obstacle to anti-retroviral therapies currently used to treat HIV infection, which only target actively replicating virus rather than those proviruses laying dormant in host genomes, which have the potential to reseed infection.

Ho continued in Siliciano's laboratory between 2013 and 2017 as a postdoctoral researcher and then research associate. During that time, she continued to characterize proviruses in the latent reservoir. She found that proteins derived from mutant proviruses upon CD4+ T cell activation elicit an immune response from cytotoxic T cell. Previously, these mutant proviruses were thought to be defective and therefore harmless, but Ho and her colleagues demonstrated that at least some of these mutants produce proteins the host immune system recognizes as HIV. These mutant proteins can serve as a decoy, causing the immune system to attack non-infectious viral proteins, while leaving infectious ones to continue infection.

== Career ==
In 2017, Ho became an Assistant Professor in the departments of Infectious Diseases and Microbial Pathogenesis at Yale School of Medicine. Her research is supported by a National Institutes of Health R01 Research Grant awarded through the National Institute of Allergy and Infectious Diseases to study the clonal expansion of HIV-infected T cells, which can contribute to viral rebound if T cells containing intact provirus are activated, presenting an obstacle to HIV treatment. She has collaborated with Akiko Iwasaki's laboratory at Yale to uncover the molecular mechanisms underlying the maintenance of HIV latency. They found that the protein Apobec3A blocks HIV reactivation by binding to the region of HIV DNA that would otherwise allow the virus to replicate. Ho has an additional R61 grant from NIH's National Institute on Drug Abuse to understand how medication-assisted treatment for opioid use disorder impacts the reactivation of HIV provirus for those infected with HIV to reduce the likelihood of reseeding illness.

Ho has also contributed her expertise in the host immune response to further the research community's understanding of the novel coronavirus (2019-nCoV), which has led to the COVID-19 pandemic. She co-authored a perspective on a recent study that cited a fatal overreaction of the body's immune system known as a cytokine storm, rather than viral load, as the cause of respiratory failure in COVID-19 patients.

== Selected publications ==
- Pedersen, Savannah F.; Ho, Ya-Chi (13 April 2020). "SARS-CoV-2: a storm is raging". Journal of Clinical Investigation. 130 (5): 2202–2205. doi:10.1172/JCI137647. PMC 7190904. PMID 32217834. S2CID 214682472.
- Pollack, Ross A.; Jones, R. Brad; Pertea, Mihaela; Bruner, Katherine M.; Martin, Alyssa R.; Thomas, Allison S.; Capoferri, Adam A.; Beg, Subul A.; Huang, Szu-Han; Karandish, Sara; Hao, Haiping; Halper-Stromberg, Eitan; Yong, Patrick C.; Kovacs, Colin; Benko, Erika; Siliciano, Robert F.; Ho, Ya-Chi (April 2017). "Defective HIV-1 Proviruses Are Expressed and Can Be Recognized by Cytotoxic T Lymphocytes, which Shape the Proviral Landscape". Cell Host & Microbe. 21 (4): 494–506.e4. doi:10.1016/j.chom.2017.03.008. PMC 5433942. PMID 28407485.
- Ho, Ya-Chi; Shan, Liang; Hosmane, Nina N.; Wang, Jeffrey; Laskey, Sarah B.; Rosenbloom, Daniel I.S.; Lai, Jun; Blankson, Joel N.; Siliciano, Janet D.; Siliciano, Robert F. (October 2013). "Replication-Competent Noninduced Proviruses in the Latent Reservoir Increase Barrier to HIV-1 Cure". Cell. 155 (3): 540–551. doi:10.1016/j.cell.2013.09.020. PMC 3896327. PMID 24243014.

== Awards & honors ==
- Andy Kaplan Prize, Cold Spring Harbor Laboratory Meetings on Retroviruses, 2018
- Lois E. and Franklin H. Top, Jr. Yale Scholar Award, 2017
- Distinguished Alumni Award, National Cheng Kung University, 2016
