= Ci-Ling Pan =

Ci-Ling Pan from the National Tsing Hua University, was awarded the status of Fellow in the American Physical Society, after they were nominated by their Division of Laser Science in 2009, for pioneering studies of the physics and technology of ion-planted semiconductor and liquid-crystal devices for ultrafast and THz applications, and for significant contributions toward developing tunable and ultrafast laser systems for applications in communications, sensing, spectroscopy and materials diagnostics and processing.

== See also ==
- List of fellows of the American Physical Society (1998–2010)
