= Nancy Y. Lee =

Taiwanese radiation oncologist

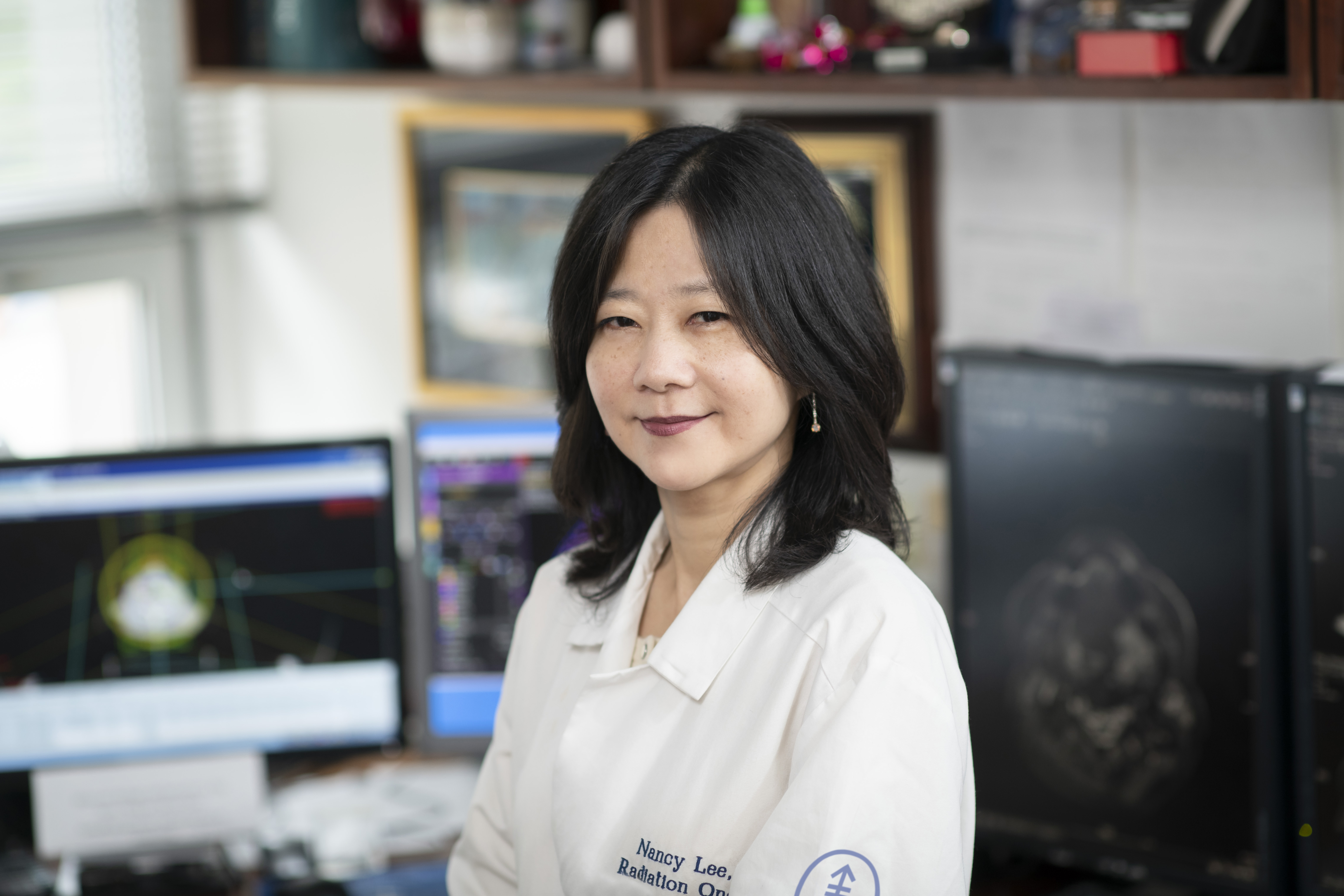
- Born: Taiwan
- Education: Barnard College; University of Medicine and Dentistry of New Jersey
- Medical career
- Profession: Physician
- Field: Radiation oncology
- Institutions: Memorial Sloan Kettering Cancer Center

Nancy Y. Lee is a Taiwanese-born American physician and the vice-chair of the Department of Radiation Oncology in Memorial Sloan Kettering's Department of Medicine.

== Biography ==
Lee was born in Taiwan and received her bachelor's degree from Barnard College, where she majored in chemistry. She earned her medical degree at the University of Medicine and Dentistry of New Jersey, and completed her residency in Radiation Oncology at the Columbia Presbyterian Medical Center.

Lee has two sons and her husband is an academic ENT surgeon.

== Career ==
Lee specializes in using intensity-modulated radiation therapy (IMRT) to treat thyroid and head and neck cancers. She served as the principal investigator for the Radiation Therapy Oncology Group (RTOG) in a national trial to refine the use of IMRT for treating nasopharyngeal cancer. She is also a member of the RTOG's Head and Neck Cancer Working Group.

Lee was a co-author of the Cancer Immunotherapy Guidelines for Head and Neck Cancer put forward by the Society for Immunotherapy of Cancer. She sits on the editorial board of the Journal of Radiation Oncology. She is also the series editor of the Practical Guides in Radiation Oncology. In 2017 the American Society for Radiation Oncology designated her as a fellow.

== Significant publications ==
- Beckham, TH; Romesser, PB; Groen, AH; Sabol, C; Shaha, AR; Sabra, M; Brinkman, T; Spielsinger, D; McBride, S; Tsai, CJ; Riaz, N; Tuttle, RM; Fagin, JA; Sherman, EJ; Wong, RJ; Lee, NY (2018). "Intensity-Modulated Radiation Therapy With or Without Concurrent Chemotherapy in Nonanaplastic Thyroid Cancer with Unresectable or Gross Residual Disease". Thyroid. 28 (9): 1180–1189. doi:10.1089/thy.2018.0214. PMC 6154443. PMID 30105947.
- Romesser, PB; Cahlon, O; Scher, ED; Hug, EB; Sine, K; DeSelm, C; Fox, JL; Mah, D; Garg, MK; Han-Chih Chang, J; Lee, NY (2016). "Proton Beam Reirradiation for Recurrent Head and Neck Cancer: Multi-institutional Report on Feasibility and Early Outcomes". Int J Radiat Oncol Biol Phys. 95 (1): 386–395. doi:10.1016/j.ijrobp.2016.02.036. PMC 4997784. PMID 27084656..
- Lee, NY; Zhang, Q; Pfister, DG; Kim, J; Garden, AS; Mechalakos, J; Hu, K; Le, QT; Colevas, AD; Glisson, BS; Chan, AT; Ang, KK (2012). "Addition of bevacizumab to standard chemoradiation for locoregionally advanced nasopharyngeal carcinoma (RTOG 0615): a phase 2 multi-institutional trial". Lancet Oncol. 13 (2): 172–80. doi:10.1016/S1470-2045(11)70303-5. PMC 4985181. PMID 22178121.
- Riaz, N; Hong, JC; Sherman, EJ; Morris, L; Fury, M; Ganly, I; Wang, TJ; Shi, W; Wolden, SL; Jackson, A; Wong, RJ; Zhang, Z; Rao, SD; Lee, NY (2014). "A nomogram to predict loco-regional control after re-irradiation for head and neck cancer". Radiother Oncol. 111 (3): 382–7. doi:10.1016/j.radonc.2014.06.003. PMC 5125394. PMID 24993329..
- de Arruda, FF; Puri, DR; Zhung, J; Narayana, A; Wolden, S; Hunt, M; Stambuk, H; Pfister, D; Kraus, D; Shaha, A; Shah, J; Lee, NY (2006). "Intensity-modulated radiation therapy for the treatment of oropharyngeal carcinoma: the Memorial Sloan-Kettering Cancer Center experience". Int J Radiat Oncol Biol Phys. 64 (2): 363–73. doi:10.1016/j.ijrobp.2005.03.006. PMID 15925451..
