= Ting-Kuo Lee =

Taiwanese physicist

Ting-Kuo Lee (Chinese: 李定國) is a Taiwanese physicist.

== Education and career ==
Lee earned a bachelor's degree in physics from National Taiwan University in 1971, and completed doctoral studies at Brown University in 1975. He pursued postdoctoral research at the City College of New York until 1979, then moved to the Institute for Theoretical Physics. From 1981 to 1997, he taught at Virginia Tech. Lee returned to Taiwan in 1996, as research fellow within Academia Sinica's Institute of Physics. From 1997, Lee led the National Center for Theoretical Sciences, Physics. He stepped down from the NCTS in 2003, and was named a distinguished research fellow at Academia Sinica in 2004. Lee held an adjunct professorship at National Taiwan University between 1998 and 2015, and a second adjunct professorship at National Tsinghua University from 2001. In 2019, he was appointed research chair professor at National Sun Yat-sen University.

In 2004, Lee was elected a fellow of the American Physical Society, "[f]or contributions to the theory of strongly correlated electrons especially the study of pairing correlations and single particle properties in generalized t-J models." This was followed in 2006 by an equivalent honor bestowed by the Institute of Physics of the United Kingdom, then the Physical Society of the Republic of China in 2010. In 2018, Lee was one of twenty-one scientists elected an academician of Academia Sinica.
