= Hsin-Cheng Huang =

Taiwanese statistician

Hsin-Cheng Huang (Chinese: 黃信誠) is a Taiwanese statistician.

== Biography ==
Huang earned his bachelor's degree in mathematics from National Taiwan University in 1989, followed by a master's degree and doctorate in statistics at Iowa State University. He completed his doctoral dissertation, Spatial Modeling Using Graphical Markov Models and Wavelets, in 1997, advised by Noel Cressie. He subsequently worked for the Academia Sinica's Institute of Statistical Science. In Taiwan, Huang has also held an adjunct appointment at National Central University, and a joint appointment at National Yang Ming Chiao Tung University. In 2016, Huang was elected a fellow of the American Statistical Association.
