= Leroy Liu =

Taiwanese molecular biologist (born 1949)

Leroy Fong Liu (Chinese: 劉昉; born 28 July 1949) is a Taiwanese molecular biologist.

== Education and career ==
Liu earned a Bachelor of Science degree in chemistry from National Taiwan University in 1971, and pursued doctoral study in the subject at the University of California, Berkeley, graduating in 1977. He conducted postdoctoral research at Harvard College until 1978, and moved to the University of California, San Francisco to continue postdoctoral studies. Between 1980 and 1992, Liu taught at the Johns Hopkins School of Medicine. He subsequently joined the faculty of Robert Wood Johnson Medical School at Rutgers University. In 2014, Liu returned to Taiwan for a position at Taipei Medical University.

== Honors ==
Liu was elected a member of Academia Sinica in 2000, and a fellow of The World Academy of Sciences in 2019.
