= Chung-Hsuan Winston Chen =

Taiwanese chemist

Chung-Hsuan Winston Chen (Chinese: 陳仲瑄) is a Taiwanese chemist.

== Education and career ==
Chen earned a degree in chemistry from National Taiwan University in 1969, then pursued further study in the United States. After he earned a master's degree in chemistry in 1971 and earned a Ph.D. in chemistry at the University of Chicago in 1974, Chen began working at Oak Ridge National Laboratory in 1976 as a research scientist. He was promoted to senior scientist in 1989 and remained in that role until 2005. Concurrently, Chen held adjunct professorships at Vanderbilt University from 1990, and the University of Tennessee–Knoxville from 1993. In 2005, Chen returned to Taiwan, for a position with Academia Sinica's Genomics Research Center. He became acting director of the Genomics Research Center in 2006, and was formally appointed to the role in 2007, serving through 2016. In 2018, Chen was appointed a distinguished visiting chair at the Genomics Research Center.

Chen was elected a fellow of the American Physical Society in 1994, "[f]or his fundamental contributions to chemical kinetics studies and the development of several ultra-sensitive detection methods by laser spectroscopy." This was followed in 2009, by an equivalently titled honor from the American Association for the Advancement of Science. In 2010, Chen was elected to membership within Academia Sinica.
