= Mark Liao =

Taiwanese computer scientist

- 廖弘源
- Born: Taiwan
- Education: National Tsing Hua University (BSc); Northwestern University (PhD, 1990)
- Known for: Object detection, YOLO (algorithm)
- Title: Distinguished Research Fellow, Academia Sinica
- Awards: IEEE Fellow (2013); TECO Award (2016); Ministry of Education Academic Award (2020)
- Scientific career
- Fields: Computer science, Computer vision, Image processing
- Workplaces: Academia Sinica

Hong-yuan Mark Liao (Chinese: 廖弘源) is a Taiwanese computer scientist specialized in the field of multimedia information processing and AI.

Liao studied physics at National Tsing Hua University and completed a master's and doctoral degree in electrical engineering at Northwestern University in 1990.

He became a distinguished research fellow at the Academia Sinica in Taiwan in 2012. Liao had previously served as deputy director of the Institute of Information Science from 1997 to 2000, acting director of the Institute of Applied Science and Engineering Research preparation office between 2001 and 2004, as well as director of the Institute of Information Science (2018 - ). During 2016-2019, Liao was named an adjunct chair professor of National Chiao Tung University. He previously held the same role at National Sun Yat-sen University from 2014 to 2016, and led multimedia information studies as chair professor at National Chung Hsing University during 2009-2012 and 2021-2024. His most famous work includes Cocktail Watermarking, Null-space LDA for small sample size face recognition, and Video Inpainting techniques for digitized vintage film repair. From 2019 to 2023, Dr. Liao, his colleague Dr. Chien-Yao Wang, and Alexey Bochkovskiy released CSPNet, YOLOv4, scaled YOLOv4, YOLOR, and YOLOv7, which became the state-of-the-art object detectors for a long while. Dr. Liao received the TECO award from TECO foundation in 2016, the distinguished research award from the National Science Council in 2003, 2010, and 2013. He was the recipient of the Academia Sinica Young Investigators' award in 1998, the Academia Sinica Investigator Award in 2010. In 2020, he received academic award from the Ministry of Education. He served as an associate editor of IEEE Transactions on Multimedia, IEEE Transactions on Image Processing, IEEE Transactions on Information Forensics and Security and ACM Computing Surveys.. Liao was named a Fellow of the Institute of Electrical and Electronics Engineers (IEEE) in 2013 for his contributions to image and video forensics and security.
