= Lin-Shan Lee =

Taiwanese computer scientist

Lin-Shan Lee (Chinese: 李琳山; born 23 September 1952) is a Taiwanese computer scientist.

== Education and career ==
Lee earned a bachelor's degree in electrical engineering from National Taiwan University in 1974, and pursued a doctorate in the same subject at Stanford University, graduating in 1977. He subsequently returned to Taiwan and joined the NTU faculty in 1982.

Lee is a 1993 fellow of the Institute of Electrical and Electronics Engineers, recognized "[f]or contributions to computer voice input/output techniques for Mandarin Chinese and to engineering education." The International Speech Communication Association elevated him to fellow status in 2010 "[f]or his contributions to Chinese spoken language processing and speech information retrieval, and his service to the speech language community." In 2016, Lee was elected a member of Academia Sinica.
