= Teng Ta-liang =

Taiwanese seismologist

Teng Ta-liang (Chinese: 鄧大量; born 3 July 1937), or Leon Teng, is a Taiwanese seismologist.

== Life and career ==
Teng was born on 3 July 1937, and is also known by the English name Leon Teng. He obtained a Bachelor of Science degree in geology from National Taiwan University in 1959, and completed a doctorate in geophysics and applied mathematics at Caltech in 1966. He remained at Caltech as a research fellow through 1967, and, later that year, joined the University of Southern California faculty as an assistant professor. Teng was promoted to an associate professorship of geophysics in 1970, and became a full professor in 1976. During his career at USC, Teng was also affiliated with the Southern California Earthquake Center. Upon retirement from USC in 2009, he was granted emeritus status. From 2005, Teng has held a distinguished chair professorship for research at National Taiwan University. In Taiwan, Teng has served as on the advisory committee for the Academia Sinica's Institute of Earth Sciences.

== Awards and honors ==
Teng was elected a member of Academia Sinica in 1990.
