= Chih-Kang Shih =

Physicist

Chih-Kang Shih (aka Ken Shih) is a physicist, currently the Dr. Arnold Romberg Endowed Chair and Jane and Roland Blumberg Professor at University of Texas at Austin.

== Education ==
In 1988, Shih earned a PhD from Stanford University.

== Career ==
In 1982, Shih's technical career began as a research assistant at Stanford Electronics Lab at Stanford University.

Shih is a Professor of Physics at University of Texas at Austin.
