= Shie-Ming Peng =

Taiwanese chemist

Shie-Ming Peng (Chinese: 彭旭明; born 2 March 1949) is a Taiwanese chemist.

Peng attended National Hsinchu Senior High School and graduated from National Taiwan University prior to completing a doctorate from the University of Chicago. He returned to teach at NTU in 1976, after two years as a postdoctoral researcher at Northwestern University. Peng was granted a Humboldt Fellowship in 1983, elected a member of Academia Sinica in 1998, and became a Fellow of the Royal Society of Chemistry in 2009. In 2016, Peng became a laureate of the Asian Scientist 100 by the Asian Scientist.
