= Liu Shaw-chen =

Taiwanese atmospheric scientist (born 1944)

- 劉紹臣
- Born: 26 April 1944 (age 82); Taiwan
- Education: National Cheng Kung University (BS); University of Pittsburgh (PhD)
- Scientific career
- Fields: Atmospheric physics
- Thesis: Collisionless Models of the Ion-Exosphere (1972)
- Doctoral advisor: Thomas Michael Donahue

Liu Shaw-chen (Chinese: 劉紹臣; born 26 April 1944) is a Taiwanese atmospheric scientist.

== Education and career ==
Liu obtained his bachelor's degree in physics at the National Cheng Kung University in 1966. He then attended the University of Pittsburgh from 1967 to 1972, and after completing his doctoral dissertation, Collisionless Models of the Ion-Exosphere under the direction of Thomas Michael Donahue, remained at Pitt through 1974 to conduct postdoctoral research. Subsequently, Liu moved to the Space Physics Research Laboratory at the University of Michigan, where he was an associate research scientist. In 1978, Liu joined the National Oceanic and Atmospheric Administration's Aeronomy Laboratory as a supervisory research physicist and, from 1980, headed the Aeronomy Laboratory's Theoretical Aeronomy Program. He left NOAA in 1996 for a Georgia Power/Georgia Research Alliance Eminent Scholar chair professorship at Georgia Tech, which he held until 1999.

Liu returned to Taiwan in 1999 for a distinguished research fellowship at Academia Sinica's Institute of Earth Sciences. The following year, he was an adjunct professor at National Central University and National Taiwan University in Taiwan, and Peking University in China. Liu founded the Academia Sinica-affiliated Research Center for Environmental Changes in 2004, and remained director of the research center until 2016, when he accepted a professorship at Jinan University in China.

== Awards and honors ==
Liu was elected a fellow of the American Geophysical Union in 1994, a member of Academia Sinica in 2012, and a fellow of The World Academy of Sciences in 2013.
