= Sidney Udenfriend =

Sidney Udenfriend (April 5, 1918 – December 29, 1999) was an American biochemist, pharmacologist, founding director of the Roche Institute of Molecular Biology, co-discoverer of a color test to detect an intestinal tumor often linked with diseased heart valves. Udenfriend was also a member of the National Academy of Sciences, a recipient of the Ames Award, Hillebrand Award, the Arthur S. Flemming award, Gairdner Award, the Van Slyke Award chief of the laboratory in the National Heart Institute, He was also a member the American Chemical Society, the American Society of Biological Chemists, American Society for Pharmacology and Experimental Therapeutics, and American Association for the Advancement of Science.

== Life and career ==
- April 5, 1918: born Brooklyn, New York
- 1939: graduated from City College of New York
- 1942: M.S., New York University
- 1948: Ph.D., New York University
- 1967: the Van Slyke Award
- 1967: Gairdner Foundation International Award
- 1969: The Ames Award
- December 29, 1999: died
