= Lee Ming-liang =

Taiwanese biochemist, molecular biologist, and geneticist

- 李明亮
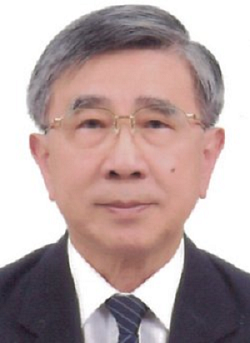

Minister of Department of Health of the Republic of China
- In office 20 May 2000 – 31 August 2002
- Preceded by: Steve Chan
- Succeeded by: Twu Shiing-jer

Personal details
- Born: 26 June 1936 (age 89) Kizin, Niitoyo, Tainan Prefecture, Taiwan, Empire of Japan (today Gueiren, Tainan, Taiwan)
- Party: Independent
- Education: National Taiwan University (MD); Duke University; University of Miami (PhD)
- Scientific career
- Fields: Medical genetics
- Thesis: Studies on prolyl transfer ribonucleic acid synthetase of escherichia coli (1969)
- Doctoral advisor: Karl H. Muench

Lee Ming-liang (Chinese: 李明亮; pinyin: Lǐ Míngliàng; born 26 June 1936) is a Taiwanese biochemist, molecular biologist, and geneticist who led the Department of Health from 2000 to 2002. After Lee left office, Taiwan was hit by the 2003 SARS outbreak, and he was named to a committee convened to research the disease.

== Education ==
After graduating from National Tainan First Senior High School, Lee studied medicine at National Taiwan University and received his Doctor of Medicine (M.D.) in 1962. He then pursued advanced studies in the United States, where he attended the University of Rochester, completed his pediatric residency at Duke University, and, in 1969, earned a Ph.D. in biochemistry and molecular biology from the University of Miami on a scholarship. His doctoral dissertation, completed under Karl H. Muench, was titled, "Studies on prolyl transfer ribonucleic acid synthetase of escherichia coli".

== Academic career ==
With the exception of two years spent researching and teaching at the University of Cambridge in England, Lee worked in New York until his return to Taiwan in 1992. Two years later, Cheng Yen established Tzu Chi University and named Lee president.

== Political career ==
Lee was appointed Director-General of the Department of Health in April 2000 and took office on 20 May. He launched a committee tasked with improving Taiwan's National Health Insurance, which was in severe debt at the time. Soon after Lee assumed his post, an outbreak of enterovirus 71 affected seven counties, during which Lee promoted hand hygiene. In June 2000, the Tobacco Hazards Act was revised. Lee promised proper enforcement of the new standards, including members of the Executive Yuan who smoked. In November, the Department of Health approved orlistat, and it became the first diet drug made without phenylpropanolamine to be marketed in Taiwan. The next month, a ban on mifepristone was lifted. During Lee's tenure, microchip health insurance cards were developed and distributed.

While he led the Department of Health, Lee worked to expand Taiwan's participation in the World Health Organization. In October 2000, Lee submitted a written protest to the agency for leaving Taiwan off a list of polio-free countries, stating that Taiwan should be listed separately from China, which had not yet succeeded in eradicating the disease. Following support from US Representative Sherrod Brown, Lee traveled to Geneva in April 2001 to petition for a larger Taiwanese presence at the World Health Assembly. Though publicly confident, Lee personally admitted that chances of Taiwan securing observer status were "minuscule" and the bid was unsuccessful, as it was never placed on the agenda for discussion. The government of the Republic of China announced its intention to donate US$1 million to a WHO health fund under the name Taiwan in April 2002. That year the United States again supported Taiwan's bid for WHA observer status. Though United States Secretary of Health and Human Services Tommy Thompson promised to support Taiwan prior to the 2002 World Health Assembly, it was difficult for him to meet Lee during the assembly itself. Lee again stated that it was unlikely for Taiwan to gain observer status in the WHO; though the government applied as a "health entity," it did so under the name Taiwan. Subsequently, Taiwan's sixth overall attempt to join the WHO was denied.

Lee, who had first expressed his desire to resign his position in February 2002, did so on 31 August for health reasons.

== Later career ==
After leaving the Department of Health, Lee continued efforts to admit Taiwan as a World Health Assembly observer. He also directed a government task force on SARS. In 2012, Lee met with Central Tibetan Administration health minister Tsering Wangchuk. He supported the Democratic Progressive Party ticket during the presidential election of 2016. Lee signed a petition in April 2019 calling for William Lai and Tsai Ing-wen, contestants in the 2019 Democratic Progressive Party presidential primary, to join forces and form the party's ticket for the 2020 presidential election. Following the formation of a Tsai–Lai ticket, Lee signed a second petition backing the Democratic Progressive Party in the 2020 election. In the 2022 local elections, Lee and Liaw Yun-fan jointly organized a petition supporting Chen Shih-chung's bid for the Taipei mayoralty.
