= Chen-Yu Liu =

Taiwanese physicist

- Born: 13 June 1975 (age 50); Taiwan
- Citizenship: Taiwanese
- Education: National Taiwan University (BS); Princeton University (PhD)
- Scientific career
- Fields: Nuclear physics
- Institutions: Indiana University Bloomington University of Illinois Urbana-Champaign
- Thesis: A superthermal ultra-cold neutron source (2002)
- Doctoral advisor: Albert Young

Chen-Yu Liu (born 13 June 1975) is a Taiwanese nuclear physicist. She is a professor at the University of Illinois Urbana-Champaign.

== Education and career ==
Chen graduated from National Taiwan University with a B.S. in physics in 1997, then earned her Ph.D. from Princeton University in 2002. Her doctoral dissertation, completed under physicist Albert Young, was titled, "A superthermal ultra-cold neutron source".

After receiving her doctorate, Chen completed a three-year postdoctoral research fellowship at Los Alamos National Laboratory. She began teaching at Indiana University Bloomington in 2005, and was appointed the James H. Rudy Professor of Physics there. She received a Sloan Research Fellowship in 2007, and was elected a fellow of the American Physical Society in 2018, for her research into experimental nuclear physics. In 2022, she became a professor of physics at the University of Illinois Urbana-Champaign.
