= Ming-Jer Tsai =

Taiwanese cell biologist

Ming-Jer Tsai (Chinese: 蔡明哲) is a Taiwanese cell biologist.

Tsai was born in Qingshui, Taichung, the third of six children, and lived there until the age of 10. He attended middle school in Kaohsiung, then moved to Taipei for high school and college, graduating from National Taiwan University in 1966. Subsequently, he relocated to the United States, earning a doctorate at the University of California, Davis in 1971. Tsai was a postdoctoral researcher at MD Anderson Cancer Center until 1973, when he began teaching at Baylor University. He held Baylor's Charles C. Bell Jr. Professorship in Cell Biology from 1998 until his retirement. Tsai was elected a member of Academia Sinica in 2010.
