= Guang-Yu Guo =

Taiwanese physicist

Guang-Yu Guo (Chinese: 郭光宇) from the National Taiwan University, was awarded the status of Fellow in the American Physical Society, after they were nominated by their Division of Computational Physics in 2005, for his contributions to our understanding of relativity-induced phenomena in magnetic solids and physical properties of materials including transition metal oxides and carbon nanotube structures, through first-principles electronic structure calculations.

== See also ==
- List of fellows of the American Physical Society (1998–2010)
