= Lan-Hsuan Huang =

Taiwanese-American mathematician

Lan-Hsuan Huang (Chinese: 黃籃萱) is a Taiwanese-American mathematician and mathematical physicist specializing in differential geometry, geometric analysis, and their applications in the theory of relativity. She is a professor of mathematics at the University of Connecticut. Huang serves on the editorial board of the Journal of Mathematical Physics.

== Education and career ==
Huang majored in mathematics at National Taiwan University, graduating in 2004. She went to Stanford University for graduate study in mathematics, and completed her Ph.D. there in 2009. Her doctoral dissertation, Center of Mass and Constant Mean Curvature Foliations for Isolated Systems, was supervised by Richard Schoen.

After three years at Columbia University as Joseph F. Ritt Assistant Professor of Mathematics, she joined the Department of Mathematics at the University of Connecticut in 2012 as a tenure-track assistant professor. She was promoted to associate professor in 2016, and to full professor in 2020.

== Recognition ==
In 2018, Huang was named a Simons Fellow in mathematics and a von Neumann Fellow at the Institute for Advanced Study. She was elected a Fellow of the American Mathematical Society in the 2024 class of fellows. She was awarded a Simons Fellowship again in 2025.
