= Yia-Chung Chang =

Taiwanese physicist

Yia-Chung Chang (Chinese: 張亞中) is a Taiwanese physicist.

Chang studied physics at National Cheng Kung University and completed a doctorate in the same field at the California Institute of Technology. Upon graduating, he joined the University of Illinois at Urbana–Champaign faculty. Chen was elected a fellow of the American Physical Society in 2001. He returned to Taiwan in 2005, as a research fellow at Academia Sinica.
