= Yun Yen =

Taiwanese scientist in cancer research

Yun Yen is a Taiwanese scientist, focusing in cancer research and translational medicine, currently at Taipei Medical University and an Elected Fellow of the American Association for the Advancement of Science.
