= Pao K. Wang =

Taiwanese atmospheric scientist

Pao-Kuan Wang (Chinese: 王寳貫; born 1949) is a distinguished Taiwanese atmospheric scientist.

Wang studied meteorology at National Taiwan University, then pursued advanced degrees in atmospheric science at University of California, Los Angeles, culminating in a doctorate completed in 1978. He taught at the University of Wisconsin–Madison starting in 1980, and was granted emeritus status in 2016. He is a fellow of the American Meteorological Society and the Meteorological Society of the Republic of China, which he was elected to in 2005 and 2008 respectively. He was president of the latter organization from 2013 to 2017. In 2018, Wang was elected an academician of Academia Sinica.

He has dedicated decades to atmospheric science research and received numerous international academic awards, making outstanding contributions - particularly in the fields of cloud physics and historical climatology. Wang utilizes remotely sensed imagery to detect overshooting top, such as cold rings, above-anvil cirrus plumes (AACP), and storm-top gravity waves and then develop very high-resolution numerical cloud models to simulate the processes at the top of convective storms. His contribution has been recognized by European Severe Storms Laboratory, ESSL, earned him one of the three recipients of Nikolai Dotzek Award in 2023.

Wang has written several college textbooks and popular science books in Chinese. His books serve as exemplary works for the dissemination of scientific knowledge; he was selected as one of the inaugural recipients of National Taiwan University, College of Science's Distinguished Alumnus Award in the academic category in 2024.
