= 2023 in Taiwan =

- Decades: 2000s; 2010s; 2020s
- See also: Other events of 2023; History of Taiwan • Timeline • Years

Events from the year 2023 in Taiwan, Republic of China. This year is numbered Minguo 112 according to the official Republic of China calendar.

== Incumbents ==
- President: Tsai Ing-wen
- Vice President: Lai Ching-te
- Premier: Su Tseng-chang, Chen Chien-jen
- Vice Premier: Shen Jong-chin, Cheng Wen-tsan

== Events ==
- 8 January – Taipei legislative by-election
- 4 March – Nantou legislative by-election.
- 26 March – Hondouras terminated diplomatic relations with the ROC.
- 27 March – Former Taiwanese President Ma Ying-jeou becomes the first Taiwanese leader to visit mainland China since the end of the Chinese Civil War in 1949, meeting with China's Taiwan Affairs Office deputy chair Chen Yuanfeng in Shanghai. Taiwan's ruling Democratic Progressive Party criticized this visit as "endorsing" China's position on Taiwan.
- 20 June – New Taipei City kindergarten druggings. Teachers at a kindergarten in New Taipei City are accused of sedating students with cough syrups containing drugs like benzodiazepines and phenobarbital. The scandal has sparked protests outside government buildings, with parents demanding answers. In May, parents at a private school in the area had accused staff of feeding their children ‘unknown drugs.’ This is after they noticed what appeared to be withdrawal symptoms in their children.
- 10 September – Taiwanese President Tsai Ing-wen restores the reputations of victims of the White Terror repression, which was carried out by the Republic of China government from the 1940s to the 1980s. The ceremony, held in Taipei, marked the first nationwide event that addresses crimes committed during the White Terror.
- 22 September – Six people are killed, more than 100 others are injured, and three are missing after a fire and subsequent explosions at a golf ball factory in Pingtung County.

== Deaths ==
- 1 January – Kuo Nan-hung, 86, Taiwanese politician, minister of transportation and communications (1987–1990) and president of the National Chiao Tung University (1979–1987).
- 6 January – Shen Lyu-shun, 73, Taiwanese diplomat.
- 27 January – Ting Chiang, 86, Taiwanese actor (Four Loves, The Bold, the Corrupt, and the Beautiful).
- 30 January – Ting Pang-hsin, 88, Taiwanese linguist.
- 5 February
  - Hsing Yun, 95, Taiwanese Buddhist monk (Fo Guang Shan).
  - Chu Yun-han, 67, Taiwanese political scientist, rectal cancer.
- 16 February – Chen Yu-an, 28, Taiwanese rower (Dragon boat at the 2018 Asian Games).
- 4 March – Chen Mei-yun, 72, Taiwanese opera singer, fall.
- 25 March – Yang Bing-yi, 96, Taiwanese restaurateur, (Din Tai Fung). (death announced on this date)
- 14 April – Hsu Su-yeh, 89, Taiwanese politician, MLY (1999–2002).
- 22 April – Ju Ming, 85, Taiwanese sculptor, suicide.
- 10 May – Lin Shu-ya, 52, Taiwanese legal scholar, crushed by train.
- 26 May – Lin Wenyue, 89, Taiwanese writer and translator.
- 9 May – Moon Fun Chin, 110, Taiwanese-American aviator and supercentenarian.
- 20 June – Phyllis Gomda Hsi, 85, Taiwanese lieder singer and music professor.
- 26 June – Liang Chao-chen (梁朝臣), 55, Taiwanese restaurateur.
- 3 August – Lin Shui-chuan 86, Taiwanese independence activist.
- 14 August – Lin Shu-chih, 77, Taiwanese independence activist.
- 3 September – Tsai Kun-lin, 92, Taiwanese publisher and activist.
- 4 September – Hsu Po-yun, 79, Taiwanese conductor, multiple organ failure.
- 27 September – Wang Wen-hsing, 84, Taiwanese writer.
- 1 November – Chen Wei-ling, 48, Taiwanese director (Autumn's Concerto, Year of the Rain, Mom, Don't Do That!).
- 6 November – Simon Sze, 87, Taiwanese–American electrical engineer (Floating-gate MOSFET).
- 18 November
  - Loïc Hsiao, 58, Taiwanese cartoonist, theater director, and television host.
  - Shi Wen-long, 95, Taiwanese company and museum founder (Chi Mei Corporation, Chimei Museum).
- 3 December – Ma Sen, 91, Taiwanese playwright and literary critic.
- 6 December – Yang Ching-shun, 45, Taiwanese pool player, cancer.
- 14 December
  - Liu Ho-chien, 97, Taiwanese admiral.
  - Chen Wen-hui, 80, Taiwanese politician, MLY (1996–1999), liver cancer.
- 28 December – Chok-Yung Chai, 96, Taiwanese physician, member of Academia Sinica.
