= TPASS =

TPASS is a public transportation commuter pass in Taiwan that offers unlimited travel on local buses, metro systems and the Taiwan Railway for a fee in 30 days. The plan also include rental bike ride free of charge for first 30 minutes.

== History ==
The card is available since 1 July 2023.

== List of Plan ==
TPASS can use in boundary within city or county, otherwise noted. Air travel, Taiwan HSR, Puyuma Express and Taroko Express are not part of the plan.

City or County	Price (in NT$)	Available.	Not available
Taipei City-New Taipei City-Keelung City-Taoyuan City	1200	Taipei Joint Bus System; Taipei Metro; New Taipei Metro; Taoyuan Metro	Maokong Gondola
Keelung City	288		
Taoyuan City-Hsinchu County-Hsinchu City-Miaoli County	1288	Taoyuan Metro	
Taoyuan City-Hsinchu County-Hsinchu City	799	Taoyuan Metro	
Hsinchu County-Hsinchu City-Miaoli County	699		
Hsinchu County-Hsinchu City	288		
Taichung City-Changhua County-Nantou County-Miaoli County	999	Taichung City Bus; Taichung Metro; YouBike bike rental for first 30 minutes; MOOVO bike rental for first 30 minutes	Highway Bus 6333D (Jiji route); Highway Bus 6883 (Xitou route); Changhua County route 15 (Xitou route)
Taichung City	599	Taichung City Bus; Taichung Metro; YouBike bike rental for first 30 minutes	
Changhua County	699	MOOVO bike rental for first 30 minutes	
Nantou County	699		
Tainan City-Kaohsiung City, Pingtung County	999		
Tainan City	299 (not include Taiwan Railway) ,399 (include Taiwan Railway), 799 (include Taiwan Railway station in Chiayi City and Chiayi County)		
Kaohsiung City	399		
Pingtung County	299 (not include Taiwan Railway) ,399 (include Taiwan Railway)		
Taipei City-New Taipei City-Yilan County	2300 (all service include), 1800 (cover all Yilan County but limited of discount in Taipei City and New Taipei City)	Taipei Joint Bus System; Taipei Metro; New Taipei Metro	Maokong Gondola
Yilan County	750， 299 （3 days）		
Hualien County	199, 399 (include intercity bus)		
Taitung County	299		
Yunlin County	199, 399 (include cross county of 7 stations of Taiwan Railway)		
Chiayi City, Chiayi County	399		
Penghu County	150 (bus only), 400 (bus and ferry)		

== See also ==
- Taipei Pass
- EasyCard
