= TianMu West Road =

Road in Taipei, Taiwan

TianMu West Road is an east–west direction main road in the Tianmu area of Taipei, Taiwan. A bridge on the road and the river it crosses, Huangxi, divides Shilin District and Beitou District. The road is important because it connects the two districts.

Its former name in the years when the American armies were still in Taiwan, was combined with Tianmu North Road now, became L-shaped road, and they have called it Tianmu Third Road. Now Tianmu North Road has a republic, and west side of Tianmu North Road, which continues the Tianmu West Road and was called Shipai Thirty-sixth Road in 1970, has combined in 1991 and became what it is now. This is a non-sectionized, two side, two way road, with a width of 28m, and length of 888m.

Roadsides are mainly the third sort of business land, which was the Tianmu shopping center before. Others, there is the third type of residential, market land, square land, parkland, and green space land.

== Sights along this road ==
(Note: Unmarked alleys are located on the road)

- Tianmu square (Tianmu creation market)
- PX mart Tianmu store (former MATSUSEI Tianmu)
- Jasons Market Place Tianmu store (former Wellcome Tianmu store)
- Kingstone Bookstore Tianmu store
- McDonald's Tianmu Store (closed on June 21, 2019, the first McDonald's with a drive-thru in Taiwan)
- China Trust Bank North Tianmu Branch
- Yuanda Commercial Bank Tianmu Branch
- Starbucks New Tianmu Store (closed on May 29, 2018, the first Starbucks coffee shop in Taiwan)
- Louisa Coffee Tianmu Direct Store
- Jiangjia Beef Noodle & Yonghe Soymilk (Lane 41)
- HSBC Tianmu Branch
- Seattle's coffee Tianmu shop
- Cathay United World Bank Tianmu Branch
- Red Apple Life Department Store
- Soho Children's Art Museum (Lane 50)
- Foundation for International Cooperation and Development (Lane 62)
- Embassy Special Zone (Lane 62)
- Tianshou Park (Lane 62)
- Tianmei Green Land (Lane 95)
- Huangxi Bridge (carway)
- Peer bridge (pedestrian bridge, in Chinese called "Tongxing Bridge", built by Tianshou Li)
- Zhengxing Park (Lane 101)
- Hongying Villa (Lane 117)
- Zhengde Temple (Lane 120)
- Louisa Coffee Tianmu Veterans General Hospital Store (Lane 130)
- Taipei Veterans General Hospital (end of road)

The Tianmu West Road is the main road for the contact with the Tianmu and the Shipai. It is often used as the dividing line for geographical division such as district and Li boundary.

== Inner boundary ==
Boundary of districts and Li
Beitou District		District division	Shilin District	
N	Yongxing Li	Huangxi	Tianyu Li	N
E	Tianmu West Road	Huangxi Bridge	Tianmu West Road	E
S	Ronghua Li	Huangxi	Tianshou Li	S

== Activity ==
- At the Taipei Tianmu Halloween Festival, Tianmu West Road has trick or treat events with local merchants.
- This road is the main thoroughfare connecting Zhongshan North Road and Taipei Veterans General Hospital. The Embassy Special Zone is also located in Lane 62 of this section. Therefore, there are often police officers conducting traffic control. It can be seen that the diplomat sedans exercise diplomatic immunity and accompany the escort guards.
- The Tianmu Creation Market has a creative market stall every Friday, Saturday and Sunday.

== Transportation ==
=== Buses ===
The routes that pass through this road (Taipei Joint Bus System)
Route number	Starting and ending	Bus stop on this road	Operator
224	Tianmu-MRT Shipai Station (pass by Tianmu North Road)	Qifu Huaxia	Guanghua Bus
267	Tianmu-MRT Dahu Park Station	Qixian Huaxia, Qifu Huaxia	Guanghua Bus
268	Tianmu-Dazhi	Qixian Huaxia, Qifu Huaxia	Guanghua Bus
602	Tianmu-Beitou	Qifu Huaxia	Zhongxing Bus Danan Bus
606	Taipei Veterans General Hospital-Wanfang Community	Zhengxing Park (only on the side to Wanfang Community), Qixian Huaxia, Qifu Huaxia	Metropolitan Transportation
612	Datong Home – Songde Stop	Qifu Huaxia	Southeast Bus
612shuttle	Songde Stop-Taipei Veterans General Hospital	Qixian Huaxia, Qifu Huaxia	Southeast Bus
645	MRT Shipai Station-Jiouzhuang	Zhengxing Park (only on the side to Jiouzhuang), Qixian Huaxia, Qifu Huaxia	Sanchung Bus
645sub	MRT Shipai Station－China University of Science and Technology	Zhengxing Park (only on the side to China University of Science and Technology), Qixian Huaxia, Qifu Huaxia	Sanchung Bus
902	MRT Shipai Station-Linguang	Zhengxing Park (only on the side to Linguang), Qixian Huaxia, Qifu Huaxia	Zhinan Bus
Dunhua Main Line (formerly 285)	Taipei Veterans General Hospital-Linguang New Village	Zhengxing Park (only on the side to Linguang New Village), Qixian Huaxia, Qifu Huaxia	Metropolitan Transportation
Chongqing Main Line (formerly 601)	Tianmu -Dongyuan	Qifu Huaxia	Metropolitan Transportation
R12	MRT Shipai Station-Astronomical Science Museum	Zhengxing Park (only on the side to Astronomical Science Museum), Qixian Huaxia, Qifu Huaxia	Zhongxing Bus
R19	MRT Shipai Station－Tianmu (pass by Tianmu West Road)	Zhengxing Park (only on the side to Tianmu), Qixian Huaxia, Qifu Huaxia	Guanghua Bus
S36	MRT Shipai Station – Lioucu	Qixian Huaxia only on the side to MRT Shipai Station	Danan Bus
Neihu Science and Technology Park internal commuter bus route 13	Tianmu-Neihu Science and Technology Park	Qixian Huaxia	Metropolitan Transportation
Neihu Science and Technology Park internal commuter bus route15	Tianmu -Neihu Science and Technology Park	Qixian Huaxia	Metropolitan Transportation
Nangang Software Park internal commuter bus Tianmu route	Tianmu -Nangang Software Park	Qixian Huaxia	Metropolitan Transportation

City buses that have passed through this section of the road before
Route number	Starting and ending	Bus stop on this road	Operator
290	Taipei Veterans General Hospital-Dapeng New Town	Qixian Huaxia	Shin-Shin Bus
646	Donghu-Taipei Veterans General Hospital	Qixian Huaxia, Qifu Huaxia	Shin-Shin Bus

- Although the Tianxi dispatching station is also known as the Tianmu West Station, the location is not at Tianmu West Road, just to distinguish the two stations of Guanghua Bus in the Tianmu area (Tiandong Dispatching Station).

=== Public bicycle rental station ===
- Ubike Zhongshan Tianmu Intersection Station (former sidewalk No. 3-55, Tianmu West Road)
