= Chen Wenhui =

Chen Wenhui may refer to:

- Chen Wen-hui (Chinese: 陳文輝; pinyin: Chén Wénhuī; 1943–2023), Taiwanese educator and politician
- Chan Man Fai (Chinese: 陳文輝; pinyin: Chén Wénhuī; born 1958), Hong Kong footballer
- Chen Wen-huei (Chinese: 陳玟卉; pinyin: Chén Wénhuì; born 1997), Taiwanese weightlifter
