= Shang-Yi Chiang =

Taiwanese ophthalmologist

- 江尚宜
- Born: April 30, 1972; Changhua County, Taiwan
- Education: National Defense Medical Center (MD, PhD)
- Scientific career
- Fields: Ophthalmology, Regenerative Medicine, Arts collector
- Workplaces: Tri-Service General Hospital

Chiang Shang-Yi (Chinese: 江尚宜; born 1972), also known as Ken S.Y. Chiang, is a Taiwanese ophthalmologist, scholar, public speaker, surgeon and contemporary art collector. He is known for his researches in the field of ophthalmology and regenerative medicine. He currently lives and works in Taipei, Taiwan.

== Education ==
Chiang received his M.D. degree at National Defense Medical Center in 2003, and his Ph.D. in Medicine in 2012.

== Career ==
Chiang's research centered on proteomic analysis and identification of aqueous humor proteins with a pathophysiological role in diabetic retinopathy. Chiang is a research scholar at National Defense Medical Center and a surgeon at Tri-Service General Hospital. Chiang is the co-founder of TeamLab Research that focuses on a series of researches related to eyes diseases and regenerative medicine. In Taiwan, Chiang's current initiative envisions a proposal, Taiwan Young Ophthalmologists Association, T.Y.O.A., for purpose of providing services and advice to young ophthalmologists, aged below 45, trained in Taiwan, and it serves as an exchange platform to facilitate communications regarding medical career planning, advanced education, professional training program, research opportunities, or scholarship funding.

== Publications in Chinese ==
- 臨床眼科工作手冊(第二版)(Manual of Clinical Ophthalmology) (江尚宜編著，2011年10月出版，合記圖書出版社)
- 拯救視力大作戰(江尚宜編輯，2010年8月出版，高寶書版集團)
- 圖解快速學習眼科學(Ophthalmology at a Glance)(江尚宜監修，李嘉宏，鄭仁豪，鍾春芳編譯，2010年出版，合記圖書出版社)
- 新編臨床醫學核心教材：(24)眼科醫學(閻中原主編，江尚宜等編輯，2005年出版，合記圖書出版社)
- 臨床眼科工作手冊 (Handbook of Clinical Ophthalmology) (江尚宜主編，張正忠監修，2003年出版，合記圖書出版社)
- Kanski全身性疾病之眼部表徵與鑑別診斷 (Systemic Diseases and the Eye Signs and Differential Diagnosis) (江尚宜等編譯，2003年出版，合記圖書出版社)
- 臨床醫學核心教材：(24)眼科醫學 (陳宏一主編，江尚宜等編輯，2002年出版，合記圖書出版社)
- 眼科學考試指引 (江尚宜主編，2001年出版，合記圖書出版社)
- 一般眼科學 (General Ophthalmology) (江尚宜編譯，2000年出版，合記圖書出版社)
