= Chin Tseng Jean-li =

Taiwanese nurse and politician (1933–2010)

Chin Tseng Jean-li (Chinese: 靳曾珍麗; 29 August 1933 – 13 May 2010) was a Taiwanese nurse and politician.

Tseng's father held a doctorate and conducted research on marine botany. She chose to study nursing at the publicly funded National Defense Medical Center, as her family were unable to pay tuition at other institutions. She later studied at Baker University in the United States and the Kuomintang-run Institute of Revolutionary Practice.

Chin Tseng was elected to two terms on the Legislative Yuan via the Kuomintang's party list for proportional representation, serving from 1996 to 2002. She was the first person with nursing experience elected to the Legislative Yuan in Taiwan. During her second term, the Kuomintang became the opposition party for the first time in Taiwanese history, and Chin Tseng observed in 2000, "I felt I was maybe a bit too ferocious," in questioning new officials appointed by the Chen Shui-bian presidential administration.

Chin Tseng headed several nursing organizations, including the Taichung City Nurses Association, the AIDS Prevention Foundation, the Taiwan Provincial Nurses Union, the Republic of China National Union of Nurses' Associations, and the Republic of China Nursing Society. After stepping down from the Legislative Yuan, she returned to the National Union of Nurses' Associations.

After her death in 2010, the Ma Ying-jeou presidential administration issued a commendation.
