= Huey-Kang Sytwu =

Medical researcher and administrator

Huey-Kang Sytwu (Chinese: 司徒惠康) is a Taiwanese medical researcher and administrator.

== Career ==
He is the President of the National Health Research Institutes (NHRI) and a Distinguished Investigator at the NHRI's National Institute of Infectious Diseases and Vaccinology.

He holds an M.D. (1987) from the National Defense Medical Center and a Ph.D. (1997) from the Stanford University School of Medicine.

In 2022 he was elected to the Academia Sinica.
