= EasyCard =

Contactless smart card used in Taiwan

EasyCard 悠遊卡
- Location: Taiwan
- Launched: June 2002
- Technology: MIFARE
- Manager: EasyCard Corporation
- Currency: New Taiwan dollar (NT$10,000 maximum load)
- Stored-value: Pay as you go
- Credit expiry: None (must reactivate after 2 years of inactivity)
- Validity: Taiwan Railway; High Speed Rail (credit cards only); Taipei Metro; New Taipei Metro; Taoyuan Metro; Taichung MRT; Kaohsiung Metro; Ferries; Buses
- Website: easycard.com.tw

EasyCard
- EasyCard logotype and brand
- Traditional Chinese: 悠遊卡
- Simplified Chinese: 悠游卡
Transcriptions
Standard Mandarin
- Hanyu Pinyin: Yōuyóukǎ
Southern Min
- Tâi-lô: Iu-iû-khah

The EasyCard (Chinese: 悠遊卡; pinyin: Yōuyóukǎ; lit. 'Easy Travel Card') is a contactless smartcard system operated by the EasyCard Corporation (previously the Taipei Smart Card Corporation) for payment on the Taipei Metro, buses, and other public transport services in Taipei since June 2002. Its usage has since expanded to other public transport services in major cities throughout Taiwan, as well as convenience stores, department stores, supermarkets, taxis, and other retailers since 1 April 2010. Like conventional electronic fare systems, the card employs RFID technology to operate without physical contact. They are available for purchase at all metro stations and all chain convenience stores.

== History ==
The Taipei Smart Card Corporation was established in 2000 with a total capitalization of NT$700 million. Shareholders include the Taipei City Government, the Taipei Rapid Transit Corporation, banks, bus companies, and other companies. Promotional trials of the card began in 2001, and the card was officially released in 2002. In 2008, the company changed its name to the EasyCard Corporation to increase branding and visibility.

By April 2016, the company had issued over 60 million cards. EasyCard transactions now account for 91% of Taipei Metro system transactions, 92% of bus transactions, and 71% of parking lot transactions. Daily transactions reached 3.1 million in 2009.

=== Brand ===
The name EasyCard was chosen in a contest where the general public was asked to propose names. The logo, designed by Y&P Design Group, is composed of four different colored logos radiating outward, each representing something different: technology and unhindered travel, sustainable development, commitment, and efficiency. In 2003, the EasyCard logo won the 20th American Corporate Identity Award of Excellence.

== Card usage ==
=== Taipei Metro ===
Users of the card on the Taipei Metro are required to pass the card over the EasyCard sensor area on fare gates both entering and exiting the stations; the first pass registers the start of the journey and the second as the end. Fares deducted from the card depend on the distance traveled and whether a public bus was used within a transfer time frame (currently, one hour).

Beginning in 2020, travelers using an IC Card such as EasyCard on Taipei MRT trains will receive a rebate of between 10 and 30% on all Taipei MRT fares, with the discount percentage based on the number of rides taken during the month. The rebate amount is deposited onto the IC card the next time the traveler uses the card on the Taipei MRT after the end of the respective month, but the rebate must be collected within six months. Prior to the current rebate scheme, IC card users were instead given an automatic 20% discount off every published fare.

The EasyCard can also be used for the Maokong Gondola without any discounts.

=== Taichung MRT ===
The EasyCard can be used on the Taichung MRT.

=== Taoyuan Metro ===
The EasyCard are available for each station of the Taoyuan Airport MRT.

Using the card to shuttle between the three stations from A12 station (Airport Terminal 1) to A14a station (Airport Hotel) is free.

=== Kaohsiung Metro ===
Users of the card can use the card on the Red and Orange Lines of the Kaohsiung Metro. Fares deducted from the card depend on the distance traveled and a 15% discount over single journey tokens, which is the same as iPASS.

The Circular light rail enabled EasyCard usage from February 2018.

The EasyCard can be topped up only at the information center of each station of Kaohsiung Metro. The add-value machines are scheduled to enable EasyCard add-value function in May 2018.

=== Taiwan Railway ===
The EasyCard is available for all stations of Taiwan Railway. Passengers holding the card can take all trains except Taroko Express, Puyuma Express, group trains, tourism trains, and specified operating trains.

There is a 10% discount if the travelling distance is less than 70km.

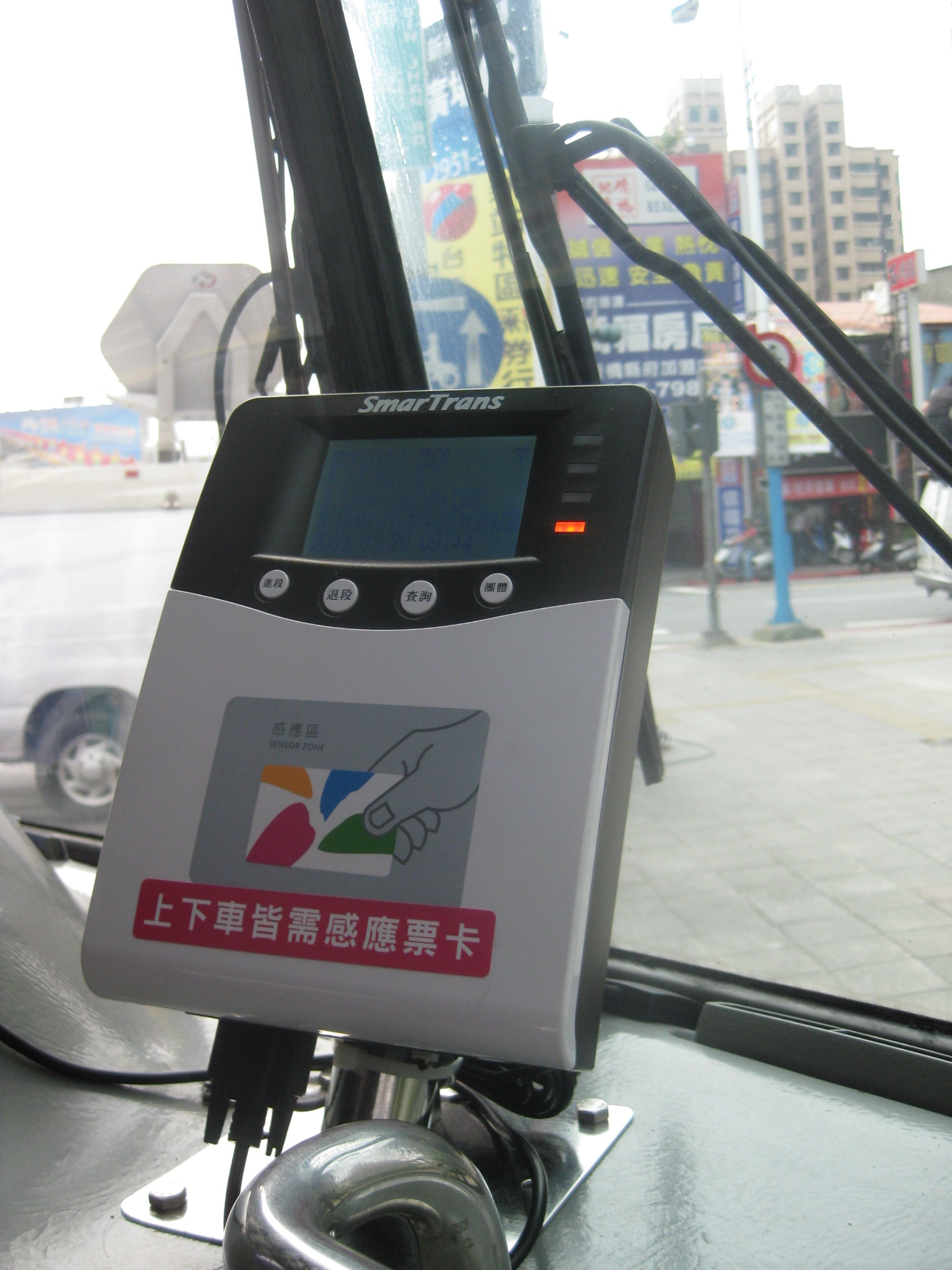
An EasyCard reader on a New Taipei City bus.

=== Buses ===
The EasyCard can be used on most city bus systems and several inter-city bus in Taiwan. The card might not be accepted on several routes.

In Taipei, passengers using Adult cards (including co-branded credit cards and debit cards), Student cards, or Concessionaire (Welfare) cards to transfer between Metro and bus within one hour, receive an NT$8, NT$6 and NT$4 discount respectively. The EasyCard machine prevents repeated transactions on the same card until the bus travels into the next paying section.

In Taichung, users can enjoy a 10-kilometer free ride.

=== Taxis ===
A trial allowing the payment of taxi fares with the card was carried out in 2005 but this payment option was not then implemented on a wider level for taxi journeys.

=== Parking ===
The EasyCard is accepted in government-run parking lots and some privately run parking lots. Parking meters accept Easy Cards exclusively, charged in quarter-hour increments, and expire in due time like a normal meter. In Taipei, EasyCard is also accepted at public garages adjacent to Taipei Metro stations and in other areas of Taipei. As of 2008, the EasyCard can be used to pay for boat rides in areas such as Tamsui.

=== Designated retailers ===
As of 1 April 2024, EasyCards can now be used to pay for purchases at a variety of stores across Taiwan including 7-Eleven, FamilyMart, Cosmed, OK Mart, Hi-Life, Starbucks, Muji, Daiso and Pacific SOGO. The EasyCard can now be used at over 10,000 retail outlets throughout Taiwan. In 2011, card usage is expected to be expanded to gas stations and fast food chains.

=== Other uses ===
In addition to payment, the EasyCard has also been used as a multifunctional card. At the 2010 World Model UN Conference held in Taipei, the card served as a ticket, meal coupon, and identification card (in addition to its regular uses). Limited edition cards have also been sold to raise money for charity.

=== Other areas of use ===
In addition to paying for public transit, parking, and select retailers, the EasyCard can also be used for:

- Most buses in multiple areas in Taiwan
- Ferries (Taipei Blue highway).
- Admission into the Taipei Zoo, and at some museums, festival activities and recreational areas.
- Library cards, allowing the user to borrow materials from Taipei or Yilan Public Libraries.
- Digital IDs, including Student ID Cards.
- YouBike bicycle sharing system. (Registration with the YouBike system with registered mobile telephone is required)

== Payment and recharge ==
EasyCards can be used for purchases of up to NT$1,000 at available stores once, up to a maximum of NT$3,000 per day. This limit does not apply to payment of government fees, public service charges, medical costs, transport services (including recreational services like the Maokong Gondola or bicycle rental), miscellaneous school expenses, and parking fees. Value can be recharged in multiples of NT$100 and each card can hold up to NT$10,000 of value.

For consumer safety, all money from EasyCard deposits are held in the EasyCard Prepaid Trust Fund managed by Cathay United Bank. All deposits are protected by a full refund guarantee issued by the managing bank.

If a card has not been used for over two years, a recharge must be made before the card will be reactivated. The balance on a card can be checked on the scanner unit whenever a transaction is made or using an EasyCard reader located at all Taipei Metro stations.

== Types of cards ==
- Adult: These standard fare cards cost NT$100. The card can be credited with an amount of your choice. Purchase and add-value are available at all Taipei Metro stations, bus stations, and most convenience stores. The card can be credited to a maximum of balance of NT$10,000. Unused fees and the deposit are refundable.
- Student: These cards cost the same amount (NT$100), but can only be purchased from station staff with appropriate student identification. The pricing model remains the same on the Metro but is discounted on public buses at NT$12 rather than NT$15. Cardholders after October 2015 will not receive the NT$3 discount on public buses according to EasyCard Corp.

Note: As of 1 May 2010, at certain convenience store chains (7-Eleven, FamilyMart, Hi-Life, OK Mart), Adult and Student cards may be purchased with NT$200 (NT$100 balance and NT$100 deposit).

- Concessionaire: These cards are reserved for children (under eligible legislation), seniors over 65 years of age, and disabled persons. It offers discounts depending on the service used.
- Taipei Pass: A special-purpose card that allows for unlimited travel on the Metro and associated bus services and unlimited trips on the Maokong Gondola. The pass is sold as a one-day, two-day, three-day, or five-day pass. It expires on midnight of the expiry date. Buses that accept the card will display a TaipeiPass identification sticker.

== Debit and co-branded credit cards ==
Joint-branded cards allow for an EasyCard to be linked with a credit or ATM account to automatically add value. This allows for consumers to pay for products, services, or government fees with the card. The option remains popular with users in spite of handling fees and a limit of how much money can be added per day (NT$500).

Auto-recharge applied to debit card to make up to 3 times of each NT$500 at all Designated retailers and value-adding machine at Metro stations

== Mobile device integration ==
Several attempts have been made to embed EasyCard radio chips into mobile devices, enabling "transactions by phone." Users are not billed by their telecommunications accounts; rather, they can read transaction records and check balance using a supported mobile phone.

== Security attacks ==
As the value of an EasyCard can be used for transactions of scarce services and products, security measures are important. EasyCard uses multiple encryption techniques to prevent illegal modification of values and hacking.

At the 27th annual German Chaos Communication Congress hacker conference ("27C3") in 2010, German free software programmer Harald Welte showed that it is possible to artificially change the amount of money stored on a first-generation EasyCard —based on the MIFARE Classic chip— using nothing more than a USB RFID reader and a laptop computer running open source software. Welte denounced the system for its poor choice of cipher and lack of user authentication. He was able to map out and manipulate the card's internal format in 2 days on a trip in Taiwan.

However, hacking the EasyCard remains illegal, and in September 2011 a 24-year-old engineer was arrested on suspicion of fraudulently using a hacked EasyCard.

EasyCard has since addressed several of the weaknesses in later card hardware revisions but remains vulnerable to several known attacks on the cryptography of MIFARE Classic that cannot be addressed without breaking backwards compatibility to existing infrastructure.

== Reception ==
The EasyCard has been very popular since its launch in 2002. By 2010, over 23 million cards had been issued. By 2014, more than 50 million cards have been issued.

Critics have called for stronger measures to promote name registration of EasyCards in order to protect consumer rights. Over NT$600 million is lost yearly in lost cards. As of 2009, fewer than 0.02% of cards had been registered.
