= Minnie Lee Maffett =

American physician and surgeon

Minnie Lee Maffett (September 9, 1882 – April 15, 1964) was an American physician and surgeon, known as the “Flying Doctor” for her many service trips to other countries. While studying for her degree, she taught in public schools, and in 1906 became principal of a school in Cleburne. Between 1907 and 1910, she acted as principal of the Corsicana State Orphan Home High School.

== Early life ==
Minnie Lee Maffett was born in Falls County, Texas on September 9, 1882, the daughter of Samuel Benton and Alice Clementine (Keller) Maffett. She attended public schools, and graduated in 1902 from Sam Houston State Teachers College.

== Medical career ==
In 1914, Maffett graduated from the University of Texas Medical Branch. She undertook an internship at the New York Infirmary for Women and Children, and subsequently she established an abdominal surgery practice in Dallas, in 1915. In the same year, she opened the health center at Southern Methodist University, only resigning as director in 1949.

Between 1926 and 1943, Maffett was associate professor of gynecology and obstetrics at Baylor University College of Medicine. When this moved from Dallas to Houston in 1943, she became professor of clinical gynecology at the Southwestern Medical Foundation in Dallas (now part of the University of Texas Southwestern Medical Center). Maffett worked across several Dallas-area hospitals, including Baylor, Parkland, and Medical Arts. She also completed postgraduate work at the University of Chicago, further training in urology at Johns Hopkins University, and studies in New York.

Maffett was the first president of the Texas Federation of Business and Professional Women's Clubs (1919–20), and later as president of its national affiliate (1939–44). She was active in a number of medical associations, including the American Medical Association, Southern Medical Association, Texas Medical Association, American Medical Women's Association, and the American College of Surgeons. In 1944, Maffett attended a White House conference on “How Women May Share in Post-War Policy-Making,” focused on encouraging more women to take an active role in positions of responsibility.

During World War II, Maffett was part of the National Civilian Advisory Committee to the War Department, and chaired the subcommittee that studied health and recreation in the Women's Army Corps. She was a member of the Chinese Relief Region and on the board of directors of the American Bureau for Medical Aid to China, leading the national Federation of Business and Professional Women's Clubs to assist Chinese nurses in 1941. A financial-aid program for the improvement of educational opportunities and facilities for Chinese nurses supported nurses in China through 1949, and nurses in Taiwan after 1950. Maffett was awarded the Rosette of the Order of the Brilliant Star, noted as being instrumental in enlisting the support of thousands of American women for China's first Army Nursing School.

In 1964, a residence for nurses' and students' was constructed at the National Defense Medical Center in Taipei, Taiwan. The Federation of Business and Professional Women's Clubs had raised more than $100,000 for the project, and the building was named for Maffett.

== Death and legacy ==
While traveling back from dedication ceremonies for the new facility in Taiwan, Maffett fell ill. She died in Honolulu, Hawaii, on May 26, 1964.

The Minnie L. Maffett Scholarship is awarded each year by the Texas Business & Professional Women's Foundation, "to assist women studying to enter the medical or nursing profession."
