= Taipei Pass =

Travel pass issued by the Traffic Bureau

The Taipei Pass (Chinese: 台北觀光護照; pinyin: Táiběi Guānguāng Hùzhào), or the Taipei Tourism Passport, is a travel pass issued by the Traffic Bureau commissioned EasyCard Corporation in Taipei. First issued in November 2006, it is available for periods of 1, 2, 3, or 5 days. Once a pass is purchased, the holder can have unlimited rides on the Taipei Rapid Transit System (MRT) and Taipei bus system within the specified time period since first use. The pass can be extended if an applicant's previous purchase is on record.

Prices of Taipei Pass NT$180 for one day, NT$310 for 2 days, NT$440 for 3 days, NT$700 for five days, and NT$250 for one day plus unlimited Maokong Gondola rides. (All in New Taiwan Dollar)

The Taipei Pass can be bought at the information desk in MRT stations and at the Easycard Taipei Main Station customer service center.

== See also ==
- EasyCard
- TPASS
