= Chih-Teh Loo =

Chinese physician, hospital administrator, and military officer

Chih-Teh Loo (Chinese: 盧致德; 1901–1979) was a Chinese physician, hospital administrator, and military officer who attained the rank of lieutenant general in the Republic of China Army.

Loo graduated from the Peking Union Medical College and the New York University College of Medicine, then returned to China to serve on the Peking Union Medical College faculty. He was also affiliated with the National Defense Medical Center, of which he served as president from 1953 to 1975, and with the Taipei Veterans General Hospital, of which he was the founding superintendent. Loo was elected member of Academia Sinica in 1968.
