= Ma Sen =

Taiwanese writer (1932–2023)

Ma Sen (Chinese: 馬森, 3 October 1932 – 3 December 2023) was a Taiwanese playwright, literary critic, and writer of fiction.

== Life and career ==
Ma Sen was born Ma Fu-hsing (馬福星) in China in 1932, and moved to Taiwan in 1949. He graduated from National Taiwan Normal University and subsequently pursued graduate studies in sociology at the University of British Columbia. He studied film and drama at the French Institute for Advanced Cinematographic Studies and the University of Paris starting in 1961. During his time in France, Ma was chief editor of Europe Magazine. He taught at several universities, while concurrently serving as editor-in-chief of the Unitas Publishing Company. Ma later donated the near-complete Europe Magazine collection, including its manuscripts and books, as well as his own early diaries and manuscripts, to the National Museum of Taiwan Literature. Ma died in Canada on 3 December 2023, at the age of 91.
