= Tri-Service General Hospital =

Hospital in Neihu, Taipei, Taiwan

Tri-Service General Hospital 三軍總醫院

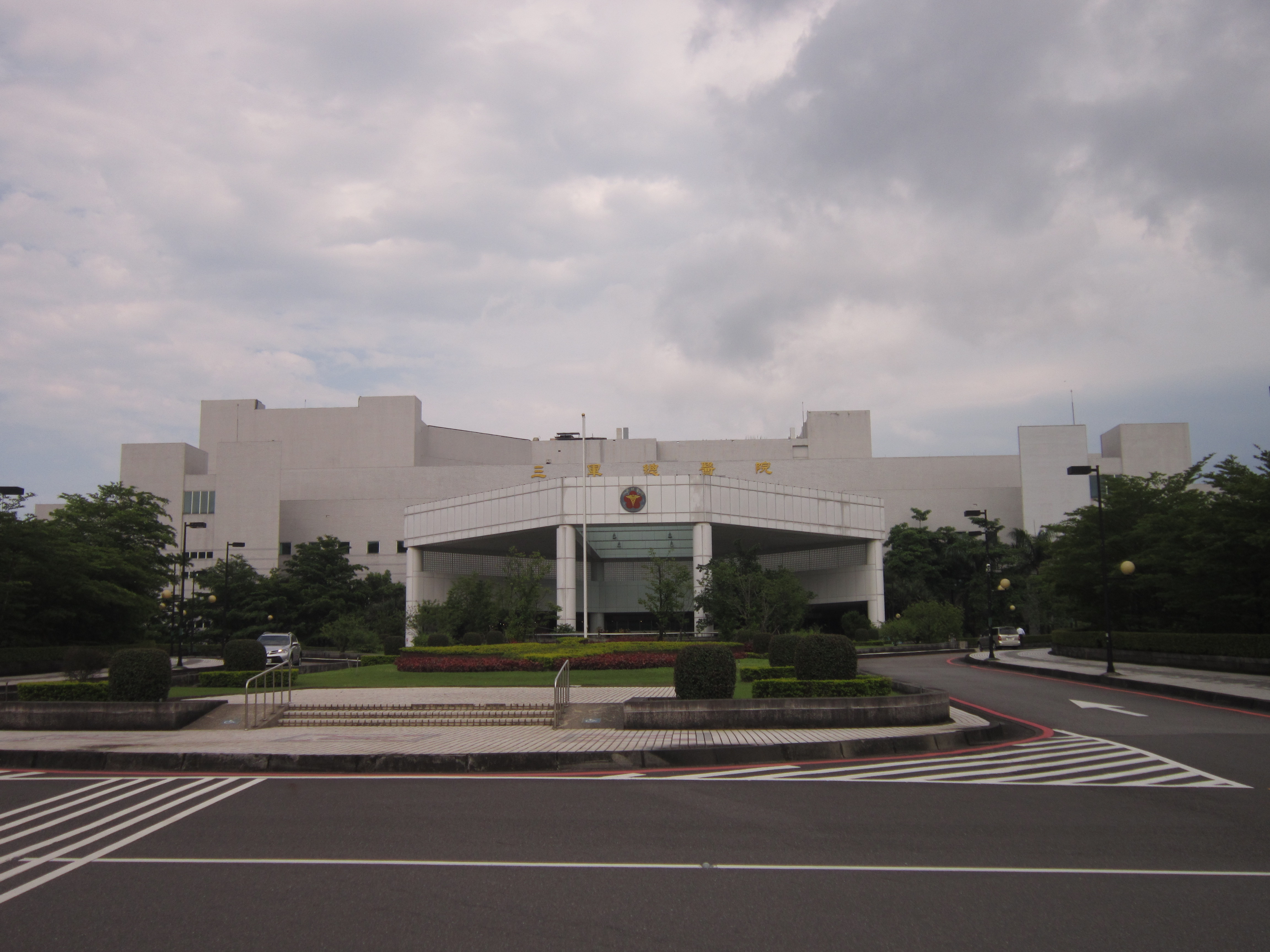

Geography
- Location: Neihu, Taipei, Taiwan

Organisation
- Type: Hospital

Services
- Beds: 1,800

History
- Former names: 801 Army General Hospital; Taiwan Army Hospital; Fifth Logistics General Hospital; First Army, Navy and Air Force General Hospital; First Army General Hospital
- Opened: 1946

Links
- Website: www.tsgh.ndmctsgh.edu.tw

The Tri-Service General Hospital (TSGH; Chinese: 三軍總醫院; pinyin: Sānjūn Zǒngyīyuàn) is a medical center in Neihu District, Taipei, Taiwan. It is the teaching hospital of the National Defense Medical Center.

== History ==
The hospital was originally established in 1946 as 801 Army General Hospital. It was then has been renamed to Taiwan Army Hospital, Fifth Logistics General Hospital, First Army, Navy and Air Force General Hospital and First Army General Hospital. In July 1967, it was finally renamed as Tri-Service General Hospital.

== Popular culture ==
The Tingjhou branch of the medical center was used in the 2014 film Lucy.

== See also ==
- List of hospitals in Taiwan
