= Hsu Su-yeh =

Taiwanese politician (1933–2023)

Hsu Su-yeh (Chinese: 許素葉; 16 December 1933 – 14 April 2023) was a Taiwanese politician.

Hsu served as adviser and director of the Kuomintang's Central Committee, was chief operating officer of the farmers' association in Huxi, Penghu, and led women's associations at the county and provincial level. She first served on the Penghu County Council from 1958 to 1961, then was elected to five consecutive terms between 1964 and 1990, serving as council speaker from 1977 to 1982. Hsu represented Penghu on the Taiwan Provincial Consultative Council from 1989 to 1998, and held a party list seat on the Legislative Yuan from 1999 to 2002. During her tenure on the Legislative Yuan, she criticized the Ministry of Transportation and Communications for their unwillingness to establish casinos in Taiwan.

Hsu died on 14 April 2023, aged 89.
