= Chok-Yung Chai =

Taiwanese physician (1928–2023)

Chok-Yung Chai (Chinese: 蔡作雍; 1928–2023) was a Taiwanese physician.

Chai earned his medical degree in 1953 from the National Defense Medical Center, and, upon completing his doctorate at Columbia University in 1966, returned to Taiwan. From 1968 to 1975, he was professor and chair of the NDMC biophysics department. Chai served as dean of faculty between 1972 and 1975, then as president of the NDMC from 1975 to 1983. Chai led the preparatory office of the Institute of Biomedical Sciences, Academia Sinica, from 1981 to 1986. In 1992, Cheng-Ping Ma, Wu Ta-You, Wu Cheng-wen, and Chai co-founded the National Defense Medical Center Graduate Institute of Life Sciences.

Chai was elected a member of Academia Sinica in 1978, and died in Taipei on 28 December 2023, aged 96.
