= Taipei Joint Bus System =

Bus system in Taiwan

- Founded: 1977; 49 years ago
- Locale: Taiwan
- Service area: Taipei, New Taipei (limited service to Keelung City and Taoyuan City)
- Service type: bus, tour bus
- Hubs: Taipei Main Station, Gongguan Station
- Fuel type: Diesel, some electric
- Operator: 15 Civil operation bus transports
- Chief executive: New Taipei City Government

The Taipei Joint Bus System (Chinese: 台北聯營公車) is a bus system that serves the greater metropolitan area of Taipei, Taiwan. It is administered by the Taipei Joint Bus Service Management Center, the Taipei City Traffic Bureau, and the New Taipei City Traffic Bureau (formerly Taipei County Traffic Bureau), and is operated by 15 private agencies. It includes the bus systems of Taipei City and New Taipei City, and has a coordinated numbering and fare system.

== Overview ==
The system is jointly operated by 15 individual bus transit agencies, sharing the same fare structure, ticketing process, and route numbering. Although most routes are operated by a single agency, there are routes co-operated by two agencies.

The 15 agencies are:

- Tatu-huei, Metropolitan Transport Company Ltd. (Chinese: 大都會客運) (Originally Taipei City Bus Administration, part of the city government, later privatised.)
- Hsinhsin Bus (Chinese: 欣欣客運)
- Tayiu Bus (Chinese: 大有巴士)
- Ta-nan Bus (Chinese: 大南汽車)
- Kuanghua Bus (Chinese: 光華巴士)
- Chunghsing Bus (Chinese: 中興巴士)
- Chihnan Bus (Chinese: 指南客運)
- Taipei Bus (Chinese: 台北客運)
- Sanchung Bus (Chinese: 三重客運)
- Capitol Bus (Chinese: 首都客運)
- Xindian Bus (Chinese: 新店客運)
- Hsinho Bus (Chinese: 欣和客運)
- Tanshuei Bus (Chinese: 淡水客運)
- Tungnan Bus (Chinese: 東南客運)
- Keelung Bus (Chinese: 基隆客運)

Fuho Bus (Chinese: 福和客運) was previously part of the system, but left in 2009.

Each bus operating agency participating in the joint alliance formed a committee overseeing a joint-venture management centre. The alliance shares stops and waiting areas, and operates universal ticketing and fare structures. All revenue generated is collected by the management center and is then distributed to individual operators to meet their expenditure needs. Each operator retains control of its own structure, assets, revenue vehicles, and legal liabilities.

Furthermore, Taipei City Traffic Bureau makes a bi-annual service quality evaluation of each operating agency. This evaluation is used as a reference with regard to an operator's application for new routes and, the public transit subsidisation. New Taipei City Traffic Bureau evaluates New Taipei-administered operators separately.

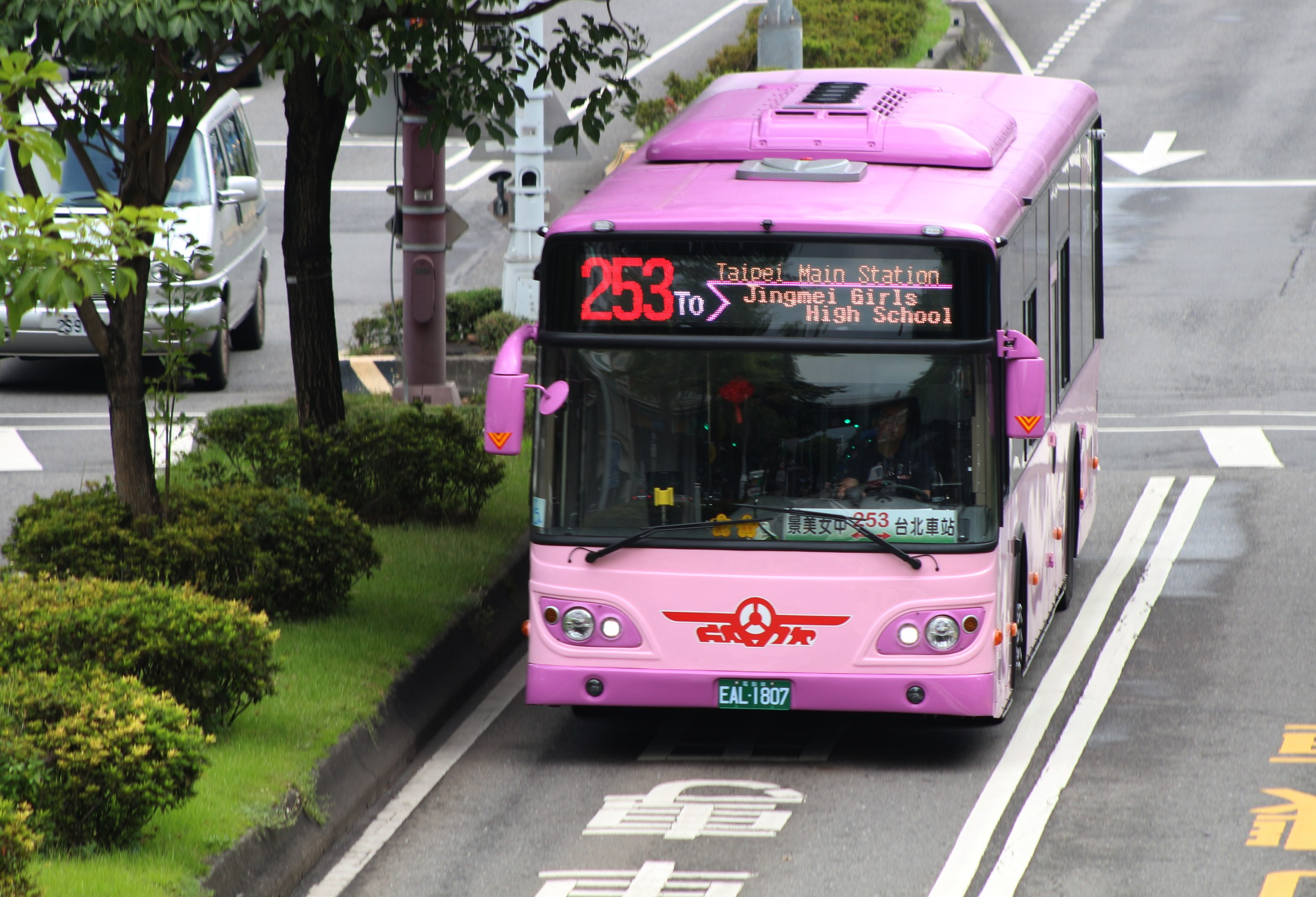
Route 253 operated by Hsinhsin Bus running on the bus lane of Roosevelt Road.

== History ==
Before 1976, each bus operator, including ones operated by the Taipei City Bus Administration (now Metropolitan Transport Company), had their own fare structure and tickets. Paper tickets could not be used between different operators, making transfers between routes inconvenient. Bus routes were individually planned by the operators, often creating areas that had either too much or not enough service.

=== The formation of the joint bus system ===
To increase service efficiency, the "Committee on the Establishment of Taipei City Public and Private Bus Joint Service" was formed in 1976, unifying route numbering, fare structures and ticketing, and establishing a unified organisation administering joint service businesses. On 30 April 1977, the joint service began with 33 routes. Later the same year, 97 routes were added to the joint system. The number of operators increased from five (four private operators and TCBA) to ten.

In the late 1980s to 1990s, many local routes administered by the Taiwan Provincial Highway Bureau (台灣省公路局, now Taiwan Highway Bureau 台湾公路總局) were renumbered and joined the joint service system. As more operators participated in the joint system, the service area increased. As the joint system was completely administered by the Taipei City Traffic Bureau, it was difficult to survey the transportation needs (stops and routes), of Taipei County. Later, with the establishment of the Taipei County Traffic Bureau, routes that had their major mileage in Taipei County were then administered by the County Bureau.

=== The change of bus stop sign ===
==== Written by Hand ====
In the early stages, bus signs could be circular or rectangular. After the joint operation started, all sign designs were unified as a circle, with a pink background. Information about the particular bus route was listed from top to bottom:

- the route-number in red text, with the words 聯 (lién) and 營 (yíng)(i.e. joint operation) on either side;
- the bus stops in red text;
- the times for each day's first and last bus; also
- the time intervals between each bus, etc.

==== Print and Paste ====
The information about the bus stops was previously printed on transparent sheets; which were stuck to an LED display or to a plastic board. These could be divided into three main phases:

1. Phase 1: The information sheet was posted on a stick, which installed four dark brown rectangular boards of LED unit. The stop-names were written in white text. Three of the boards had route information including routes display and the list of stops. The fourth LED board were used for displaying advertisements. This started in the 1970s.
2. Phase 2: lacked in content
3. Phase 3: lacked in content
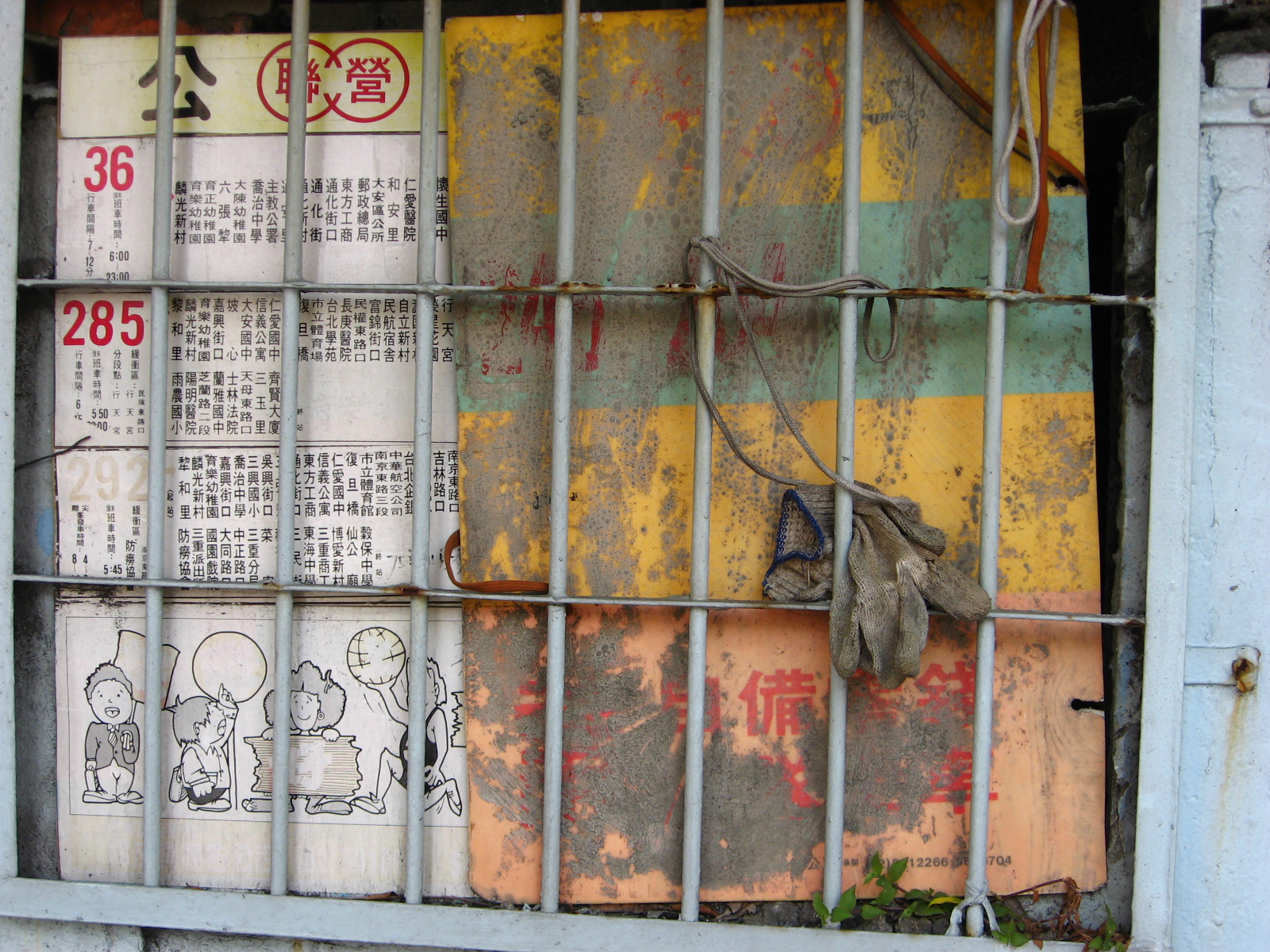
early period of lienying Bus stop plate

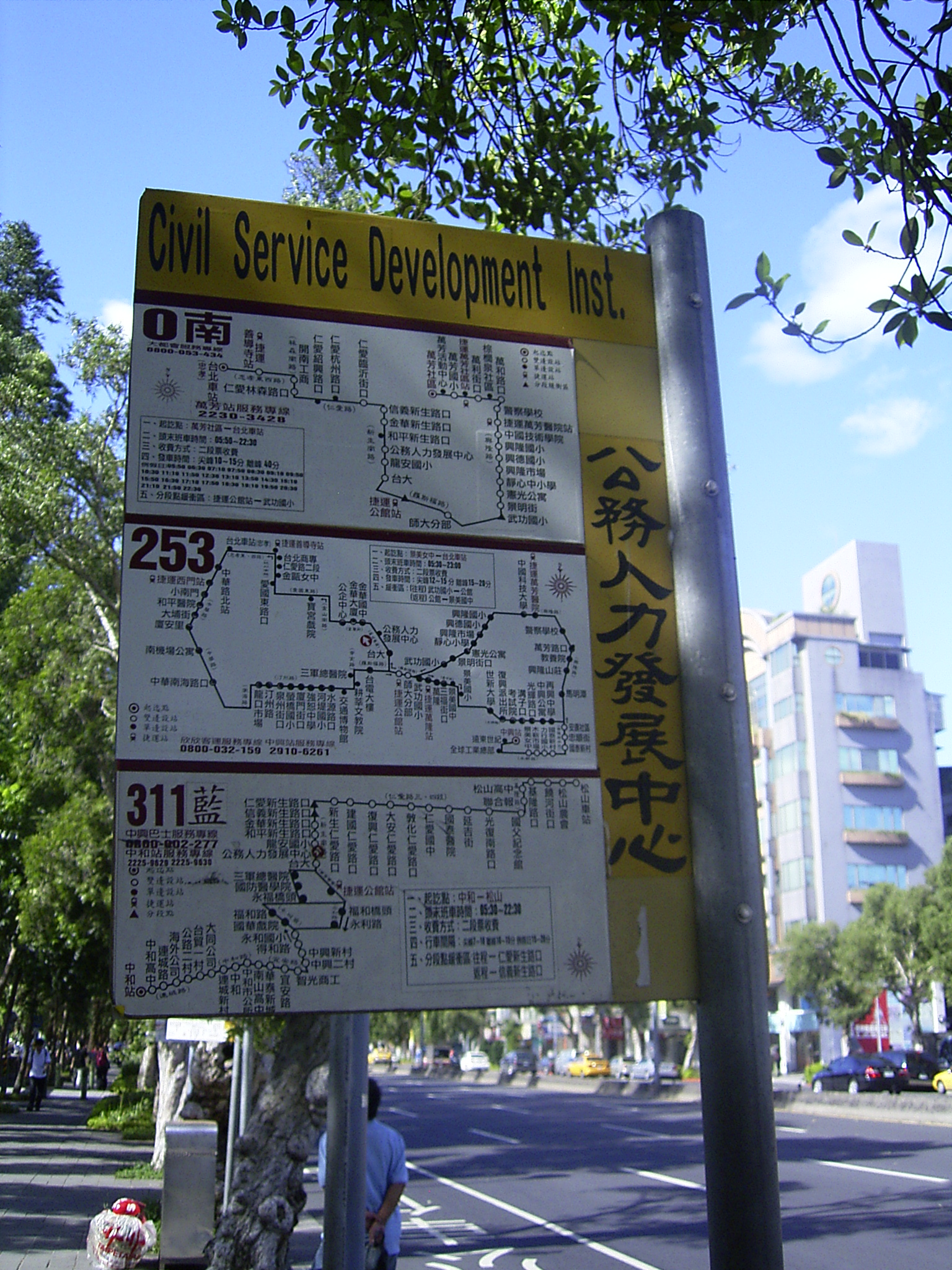
Taipei lianying Bus stop plate

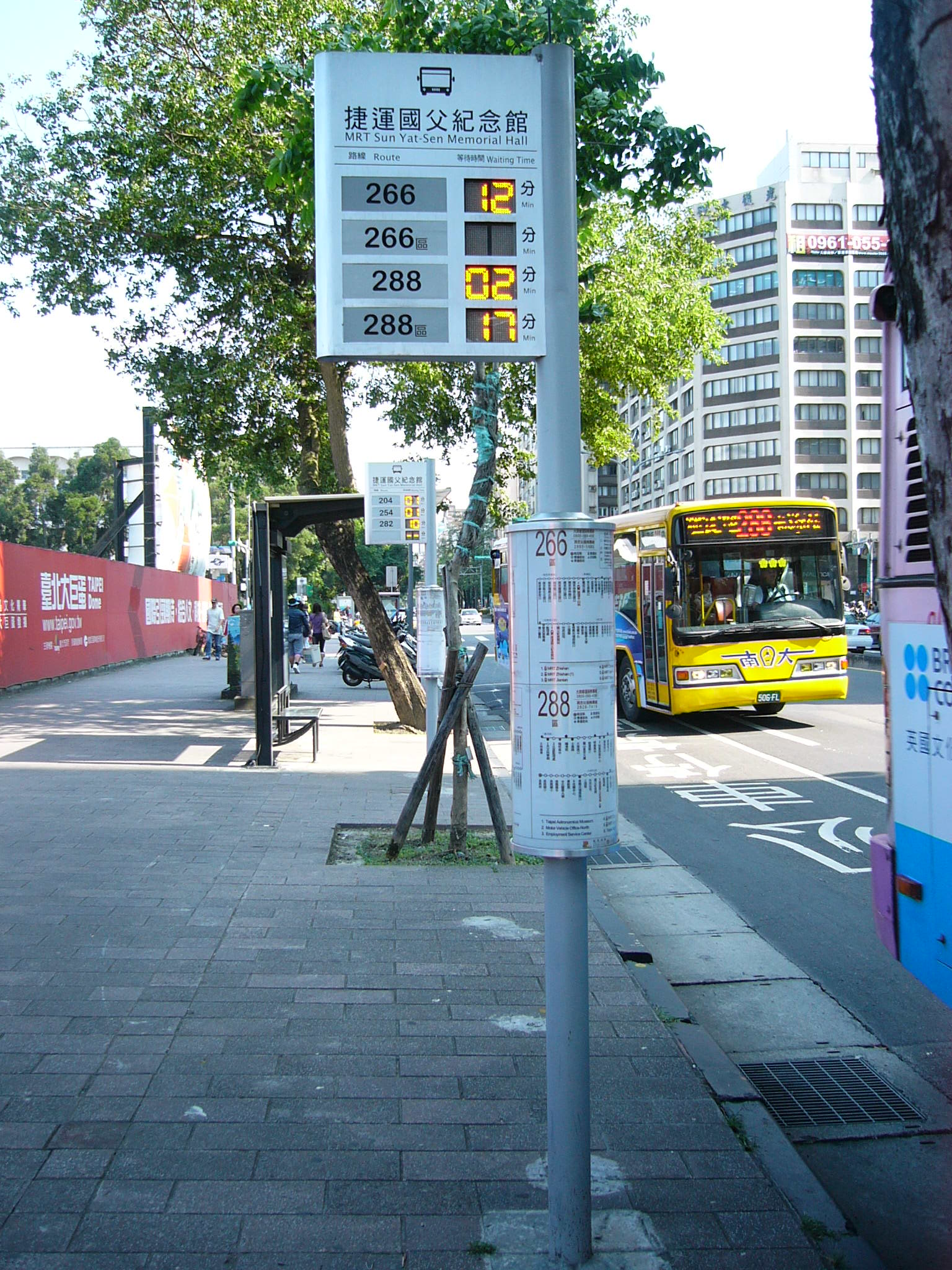
Bus stop with estimated arrival times

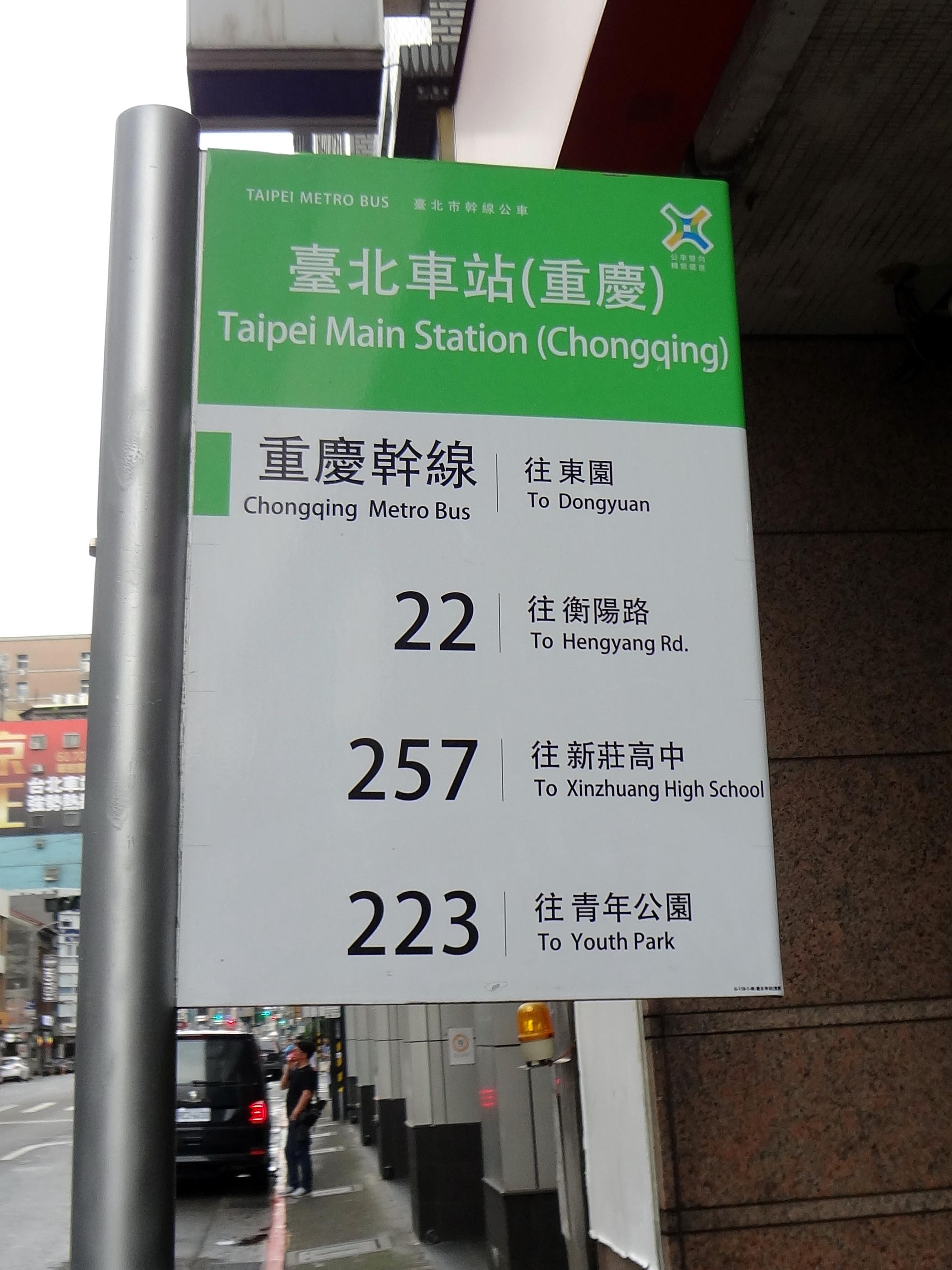
Trunk routes (Metro Bus) bus stop

=== Ticketing evolution ===
Each bus operator independently used to issue various types of paper ticket, which were only usable on that specific operator's routes. After the lienying system was implemented, to achieve a unified ticketing system, the unified management centre (聯管中心, liénkuǎn chunghsīn) produced a single unified set of tickets. These consisted of "ordinary tickets", "concessionary tickets" and "student tickets" (registered for and bought at individual schools). When air-conditioned buses went into operation, special (more expensive) tickets were issued for use on these buses. After the lienying system was implemented, and in order to reduce the number of employees, ticket-punchers (conductors) were gradually phased out. Drivers took up the task of punching tickets, (the so-called "one-person serviced bus"). The subsequent decrease in the drivers' work efficiency then led to the scrapping of the "ticket-punching system" in the beginning of 1994; after which, customers paid upon boarding and leaving the bus.

Later, the private bus companies and transport offices (民營業者與官方單位) made plans for a system where fares would be deducted from a "retained value chip" ticket. After the private bus companies (民營業者) implemented a trial, this retained-value chip fare-deduction system was officially implemented on 1 September 1998. (At first the cash-payment method was entirely scrapped, while later the smart-card and the cash payment system were used together). The chip tickets could be bought with retained values of NT$300 and NT$500. However, the chip tickets could not be integrated with the Taipei Metro magnetic retained-value ticket, had a poor ability to process information, and had a high rate of failure (could not be recognised, or value could not be deducted). Consequently, as RFID technology became more advanced, the bus and MRT both started using the IC Smart card「easycard」. Thus between 2002 and October 2003, the bus chip tickets were phased out as the EasyCard system became prevalent.

== Present toll system ==
=== Toll method ===
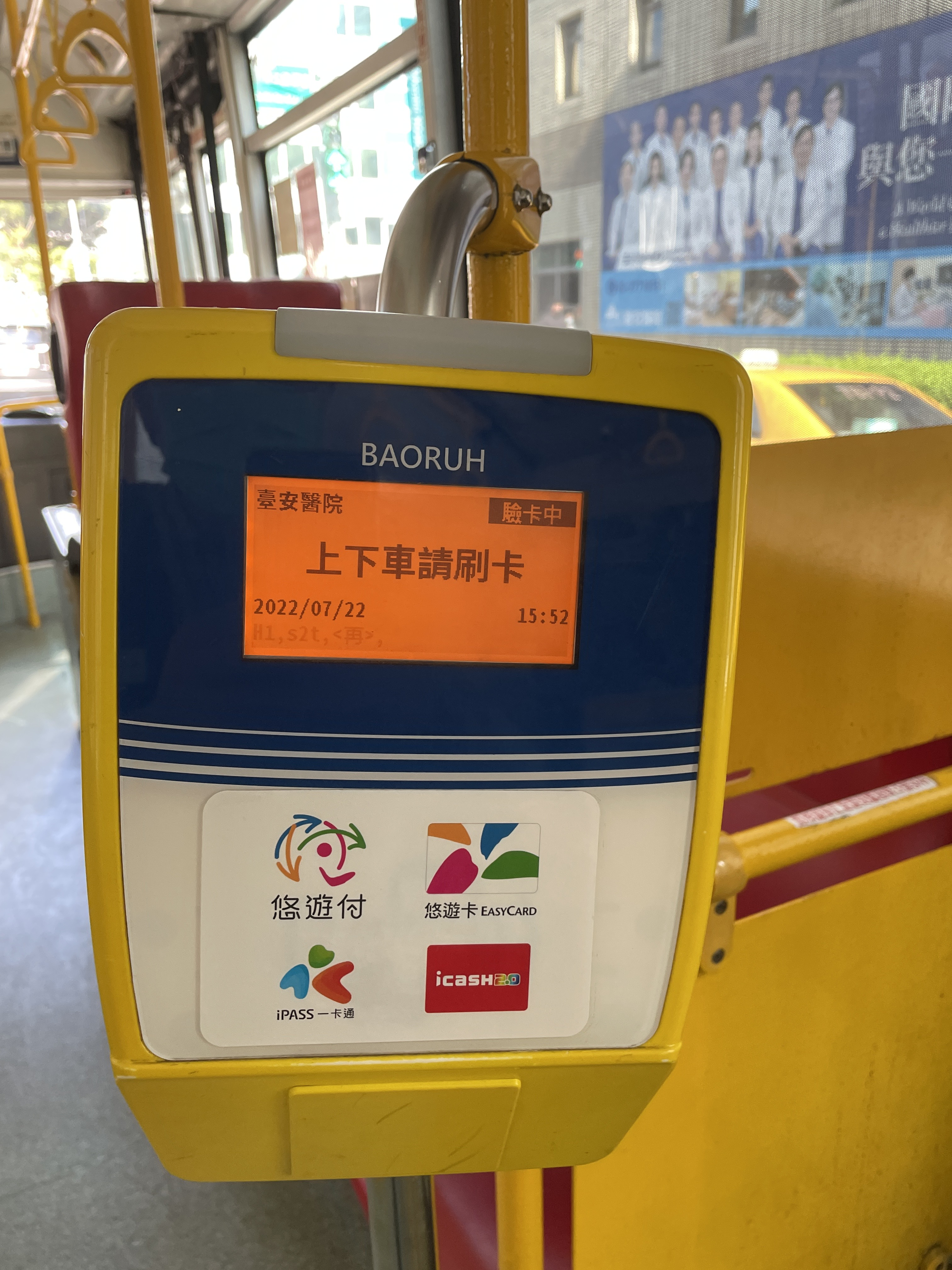
Contactless card reader

Bus fares are either charged to an EasyCard, for example a Taipei Pass, or directly paid by cash dropped in the fare box. No change is available for cash paid into the fare box. Therefore, it is recommended that passengers collect enough spare change before boarding the bus. The bus fare is determined according to different "sections" of the bus route, categorized as "one-section route" "two-sections route" or "three-sections route."

==== Sections charge ====
- One-section routes: When the passenger boards the bus on any station on the bus route, and alights on another stop on the same bus route (single journey price).
- two, three sections routes: from any stations that are "intersection-points" or "buffer sections," station on a route. for example:
  - A – B – C – D – E (C as inter-section point). A→ B or C "one-section route"; A → D or E "two-section route" (2x fare); C → any other stops "one-section route."
  - A – B – C – D – E (B～D as the buffer section). A or E → B-D = "one-section route"; A → E ="two-sections route"; B-D → all other stations "one-section route."
  - A – B – C – D – E – F – G (B as the inter-section point, D～F as the buffer section). A→B "one-section route"; A→ C-F "two-sections route," A→G "three-sections route." (3x fare); B→ C-F "one-section route." ; B or C → G would be a "two-section route."

==== Intersection points and buffer zones ====
Upon the development and expansion of the Taipei Urban area, bus route ranges are gradually expanding from the downtown area, mainly the Taipei Main Station, towards the suburban areas of Taipei County. Thus, intersection points have appeared, which cause the formation of "two-section routes" and "three-section routes".

Transfer points are located at such places as Shilin, Songshan, Gongguan, Yonghe, Wanhua, and Sanchong, or at the Taipei/New Taipei border on the Tamsui and Xindian Rivers. The locations where the intersection points were designed have consistently become the best places for passengers to change buses, and due to increased pedestrian traffic in those areas, popular and energetic retail streets have developed. As would be expected, riding through 10 more stops but not through an intersection point would only require the payment of "one-section route" fare, but to board the bus at an intersection point, and riding through only two or three stops, would require a "two-section route" fare. Because the fares required were not proportional to the distance covered on the bus, buffer zones were then created. Buffer zones were created as stations concentrated in areas before and after bridges and tunnels, (e.g. 自強隧道), which increased the efficiency of pedestrians transferring from one bus to another. After the MRT gradually went into operation, more and more bus routes used MRT stations as buffer zones, which led to the creation of more buffer zones, each with larger areas.

=== Ticket price ===
Single section of ticket prices are set and adjusted by the Taipei City Transport Bureau using a fare formula, then submitted to the City Council for approval. The bus companies and the Taipei City Transportation Bureau have different views regarding the adjustment of ticket prices: this inevitably leads to disputes. Though it is technically called "Single Fare", in actuality there are variations in the fare. The difference between special fares and full fares is paid by the City Government. The single journey ticket full fare is $15; the student fare is $12 (only if the student is using the Student Easycard, otherwise, the full fare will be charged); the elderly, the physically or mentally disabled, and children Concession $8.(Elderly people with the Easycard "free points," can pay by having two points deducted).

=== Transfer concession ===
Easycard users can enjoy a concession fare when transferring between buses and MRTs within one hour. When this concession is applied, the full fare is $8, and the student fare is $6. For elders, physically/mentally handicapped persons and children, this concession fare is $4. (Alternately, if elders have "free points" on their easycard, one "point" may be deducted as the fare.) But this concession can only be applied to the one leg of the journey.

== Routes ==
=== Ordinary routes ===
Route numbers contain 1 to 3 digits.

=== Trunk routes (Metro Bus) ===
Trunk routes logo

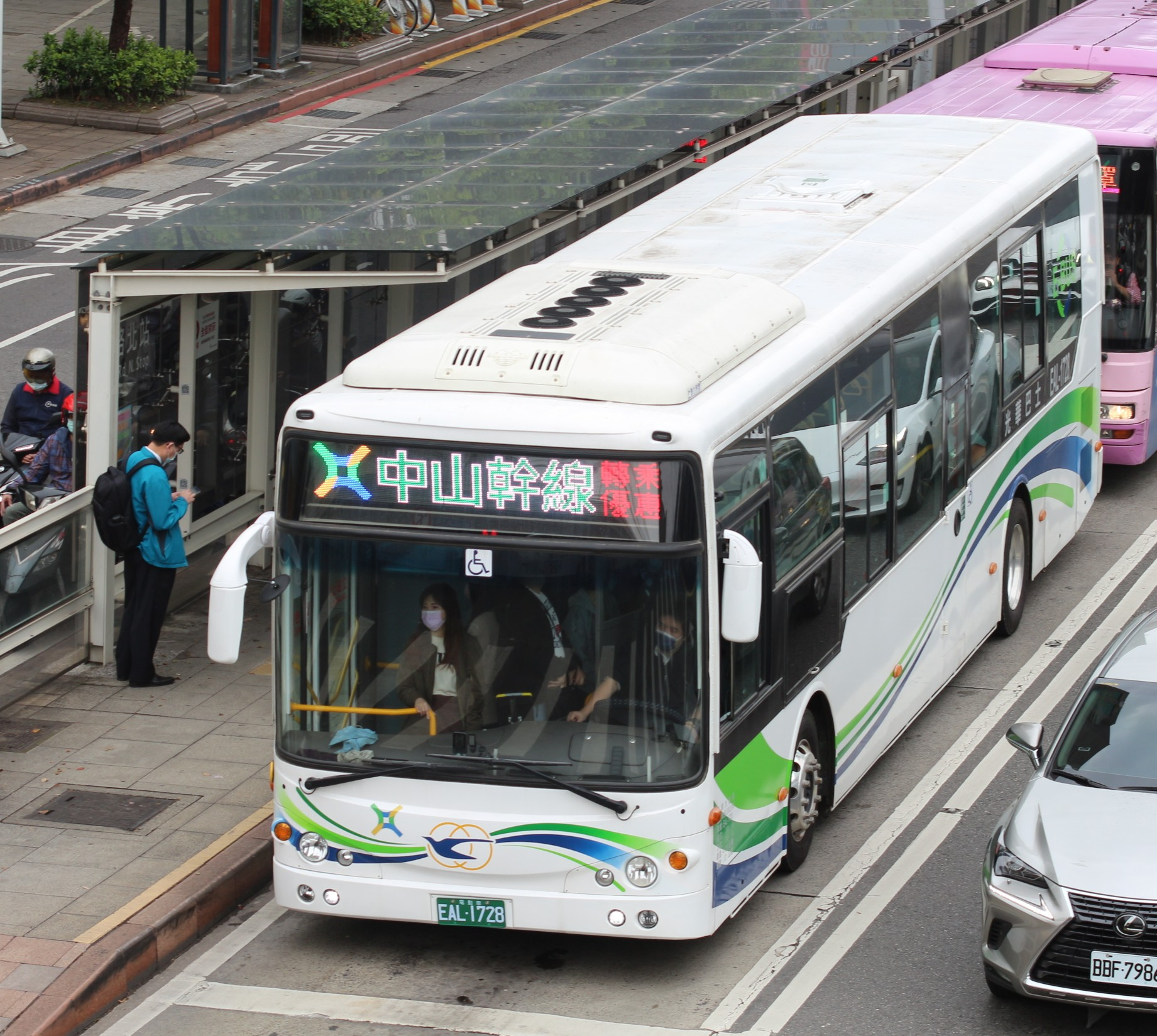
Zhongshan Metro Bus

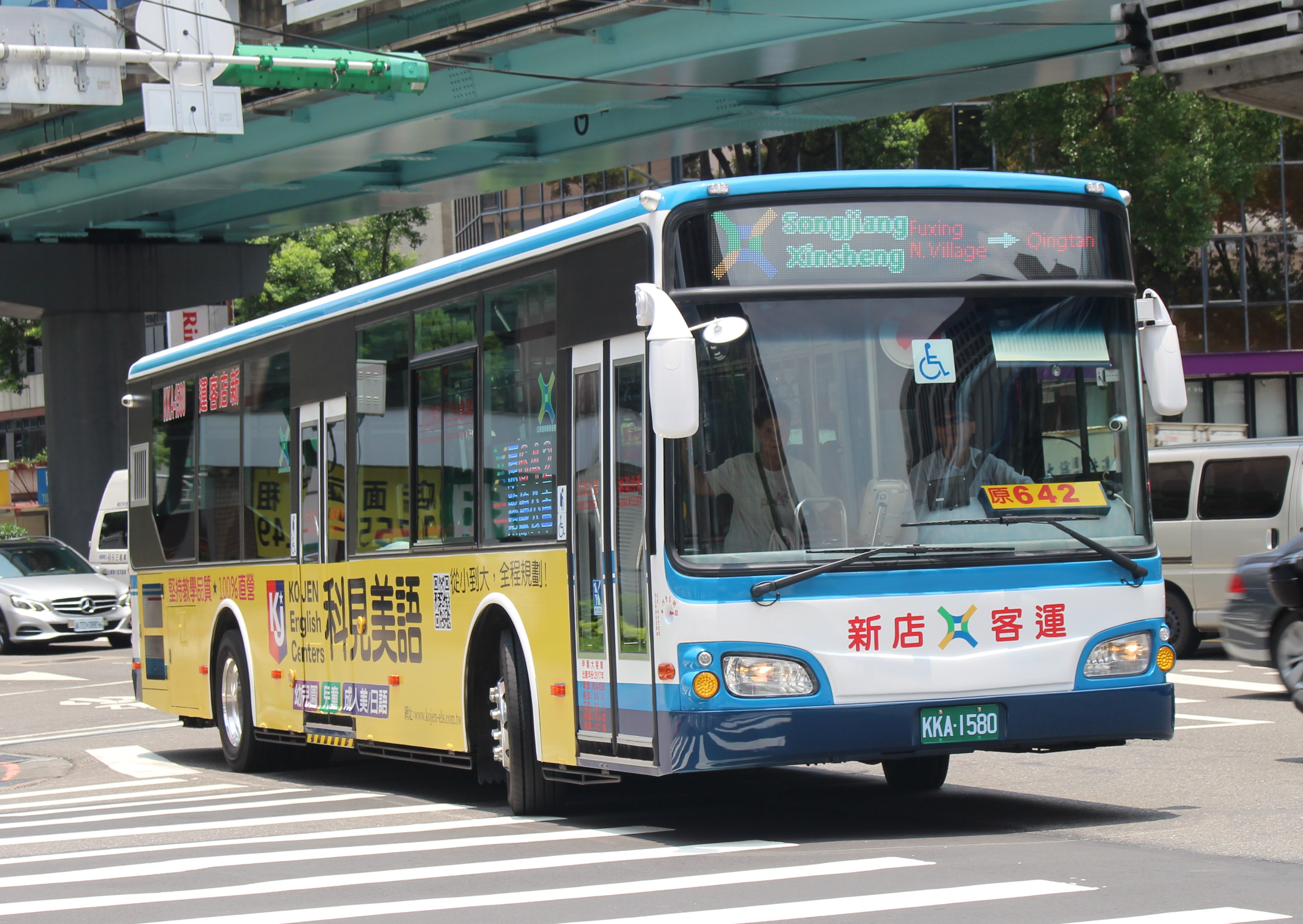
Songjiang Xinsheng Metro Bus

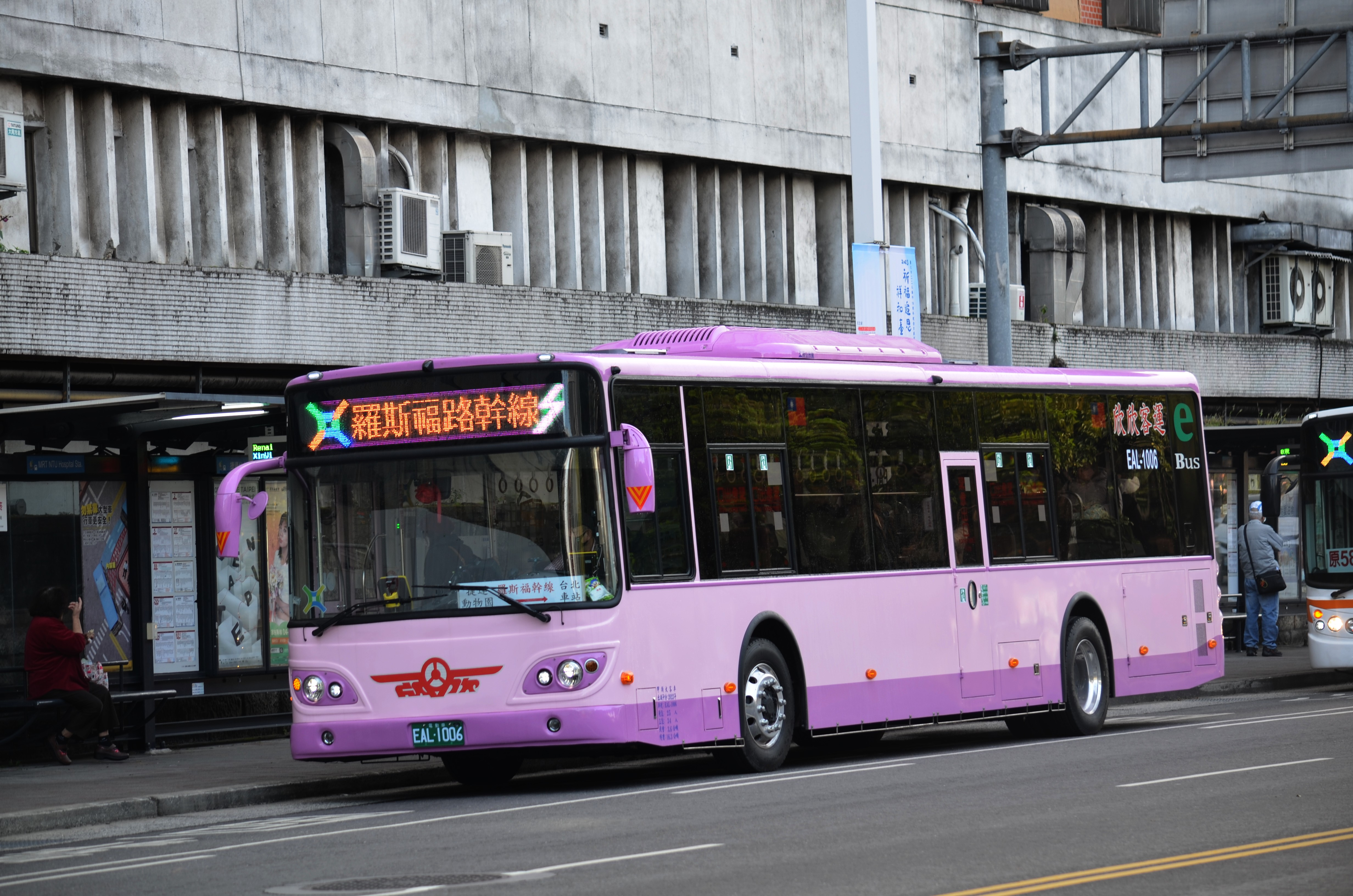
Roosevelt Rd. Metro Bus

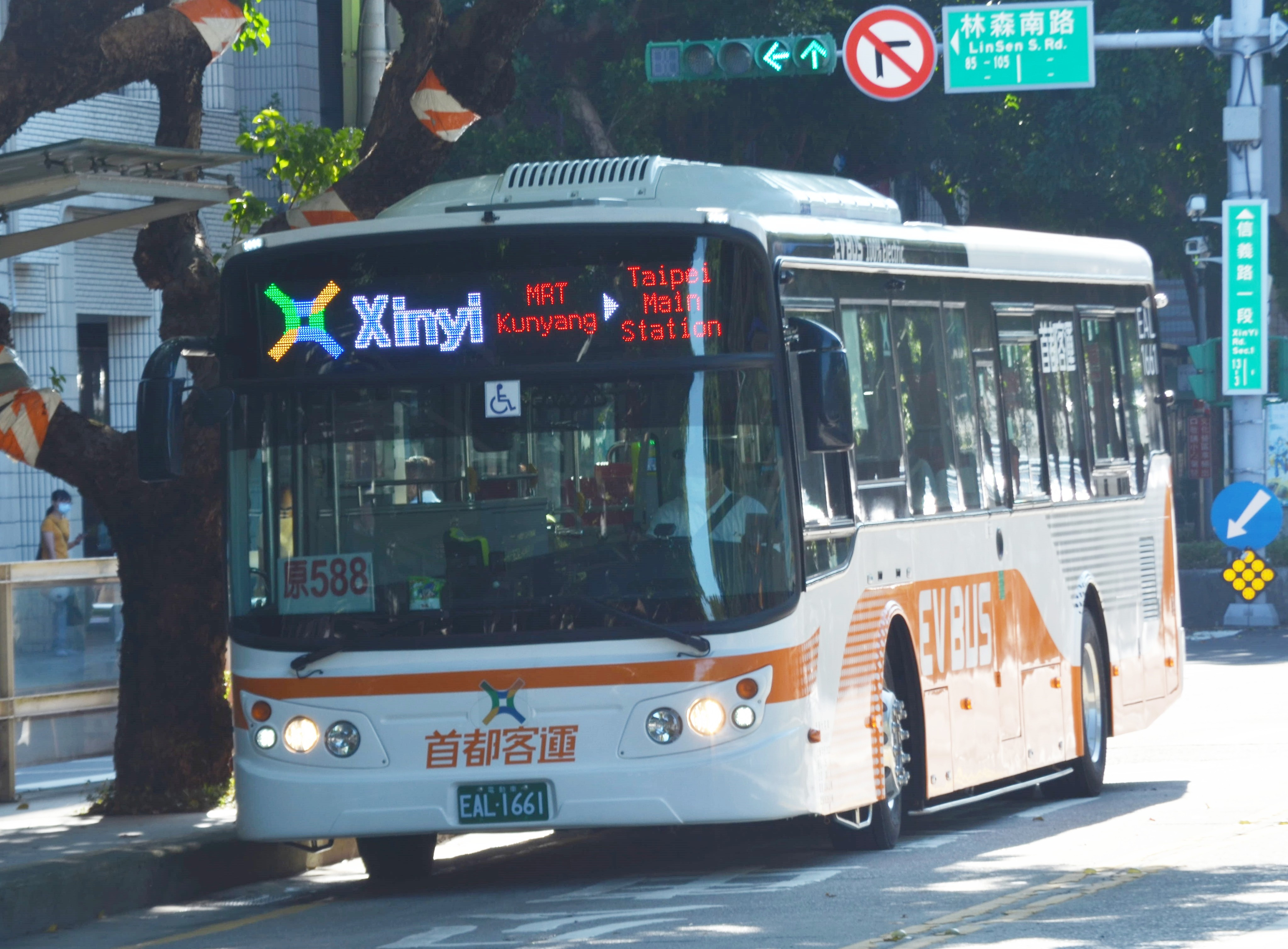
Xinyi Metro Bus

Serving major thoroughfares in Taipei City, these trunk routes are named after the major thoroughfares they serve: "Xinyi Trunk Line," for example, serves a major length of Xinyi Road. Some of the trunk routes were later renumbered due to changes in transit policy. Nanjing Trunk, serving Nanjing East and West Roads, for example, were renamed as "MacArthur New Village shuttle bus," then later renamed as "Red 25" as a feeder shuttle to the MRT red line. Zhongxiao Trunk, serving Zhongxiao East and West Roads, was dropped due to the route overlapping with the MRT Blue Line. With the addition of low-floor buses and the inauguration of Taipei Nangang Exhibition Hall, a new "Zhongxiao New Trunk Line" was added along with "Xinyi New Trunk Line."

=== Recreational bus routes ===
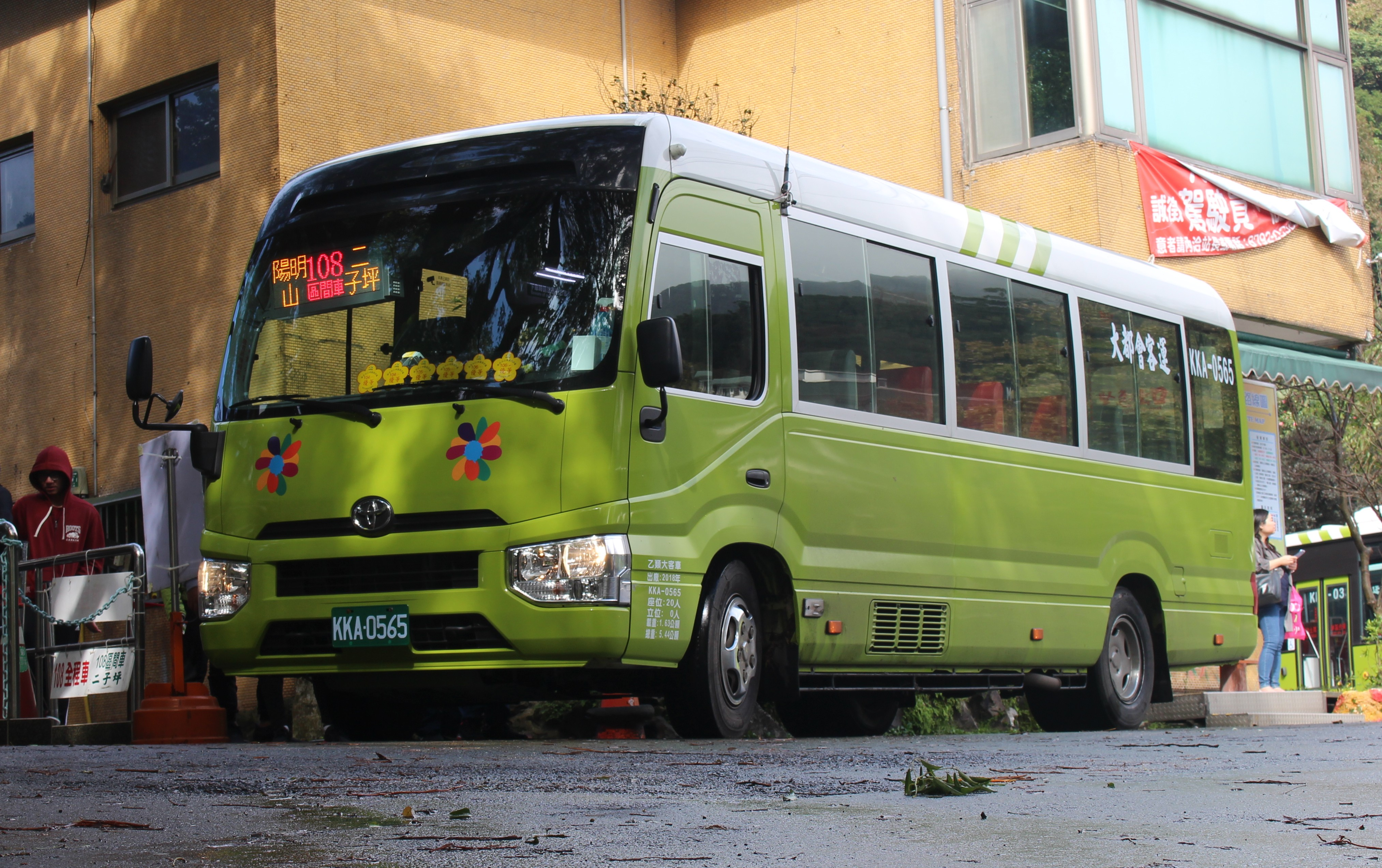
Route 108, serving Yangmingshan National Parks

Recreational routes transport passengers to tourist attractions or recreational areas. Some routes run on all holidays (108 circles Yangmingshan National Park, while 109, 110 and 111 connects Yangmingshan and Taipei City), while some others only run during special seasons or special holidays. Routes 126–131 run during the Yangmingshan flower season, where access by private cars is limited. 132 runs only on the Duanwu Festival and Moon Festival. Recreational routes are marked with white on green background, and uses different stops as other routes.

=== Small buses ===
For the convenience of residents living in suburban, mountain areas, smaller buses have been operated since 1979. These routes usually go into mountains and remote areas, and can be flag and stop (隨招隨停) along the route like a taxi. In urban areas, these routes use fixed bus stops. These "small" routes begin with the letter "S," such as "S1" and "S15." Small routes are usually run with 20-seat mini buses and were operated by the Taipei City Bus Administration. After the TCBA has been privatized, all the S routes have been released along their service vehicles to Danan Bus, Capital Bus and Southeast Bus. After modification of some of the routes, transport between the mountain areas and the MRT stations also became the function of the MRT shuttle bus, and was not only the function of the "Small" bus routes. For example: the "small route" of the S1 local bus (Neigou—MRT Kunyang Station originally only travelled to the area of the Xinnan Temple, Nangang Farmers' Association. After the Southeast (shuttle?) Bus was established, the route became extended to the MRT Kunyang Station.

=== Accessible routes ===
Bo-ai bus routes

To service the disabled, Wheel chair users, the "Bo-ai bus" line was specially operated. The buses are different from the general buses used. However, the number of handicapped passengers are very few; Kanfgu Bus (Only for handicapped) vehicle reserved and Door to door service is very popular, and is providing strong competition. The Bo-ai bus does not operate as frequently. As for actual function, is really not that different from other general routes. There is only one bo-ai bus route which follows the same route as 277 (松德站—Taipei VGH). Taipei Metropolitan's other buses that stop at hospitals provide (Natural Gas Low bottom dish bus) at fixed intervals.

Introducing low-floor buses

In 2001, Taipei City Bus Administration (now Metropolitan Transit Company) imported 30 low-floor buses from Hungary, which were assigned to routes 22, 41, 49, 63, 74, 222, 270, 277, 285, 287, 601, 606 and 630. In 2008, with subsidies from the Taipei City Traffic Bureau, private operators started purchasing low-floor buses. Zhongxiao New Trunk Line (忠孝新幹線), jointly operated by Zhongxing Bus (中興巴士) and Kwanghwa Bus (光華巴士) uses 20 low-floor buses imported from mainland China. Xinyi New Trunk Line (信義新幹線), operated by Capital Bus (首都客運), as well as 72, 902, 220 and Brown 9, will all have low-floor buses.

"New Trunk Line" bus route
Reference zh:低底盤公車路線 (台灣)

=== Citizen Mini Bus ===
In 2007, the Taipei City Traffic Bureau planned several Citizen Mini Bus routes, to provide the "last mile" shuttle needs from MRT stations to communities. These routes usually do not cross over into another district, and goes by MRT stations or major bus transfer points. With the exception of "S27," all mini bus routes begin with an "M." Originally 11 routes were planned, although 4 were dropped in favor of themed bus routes (see below) in the western portion of Taipei City due to policies. 6 routes were later put into service as of 2007.

=== Themed bus routes ===
The themed routes emphasize tourism and have been in operation since 2008. They fall between the Citizen Mini Bus and the Recreational Buses. These routes mostly run in Wanhwa and Tatung Districts (萬華區, 大同區). Originally planned as 4 Citizens Mini Bus routes, after evaluation and urban revitalization policies for the two districts, these routes were later presented as themed bus routes for tourism, as they are rather different from the commuter-oriented Citizens Mini Bus. Two of these themed routes are in service as of 2008, and are free for passengers.

=== MRT shuttle routes ===
Route
Brown	BR
Red	R
Orange	O
Green	G
Blue	BL

The MRT shuttles have been in operation since 1999 as a feeder network to the metro, shuttling passengers between areas without MRT service to MRT stations. The routes are identified by a colour code prefix representing MRT lines it serves. For example, BL 7 serves the MRT Blue Line, while BR 10 serves the MRT Brown Line.

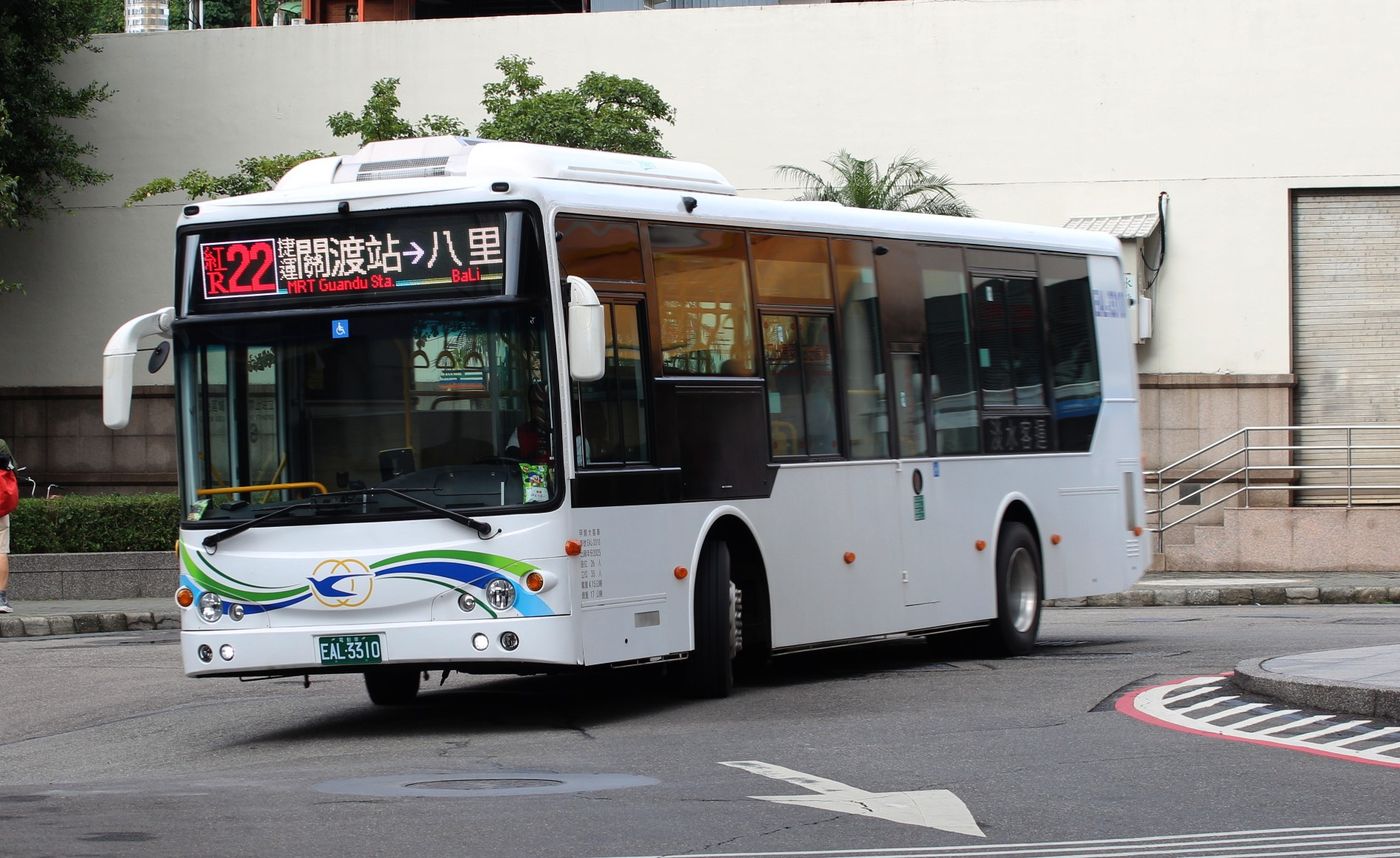
MRT shuttle "R 26" (MRT Tamsui Station—Tamsui Fisherman's Wharf)

These shuttle routes are generally short, though some shuttle routes serves two or more MRT stations on different routes. R 32, for example, serves both the Chungshan Junior High School (of Brown Line) and Minquan West Road stations (of Red Line).

Originally, the vehicle bumpers were required to be painted with the respective MRT line colors. G 2, for example serves the Brown, Green and Orange Lines, therefore was required to have bumpers painted in brown, green and orange, later all painted in green. As of now most vehicles have their bumpers returned to the original livery, pink.

=== Industrial park commuter routes ===
In recent years, many businesses have moved into the Neihu Technology Park and Nankang Software Park. As a result, the surrounding roads have seen a dramatic increase in traffic. Taipei City Traffic Bureau, as a response, planned routes that connect the industrial parks and MRT stations, as well as commuter express buses to New Taipei. The express routes utilize expressways, freeways, and/or bus lanes to shorten the commute.

=== Special routes style divide ===
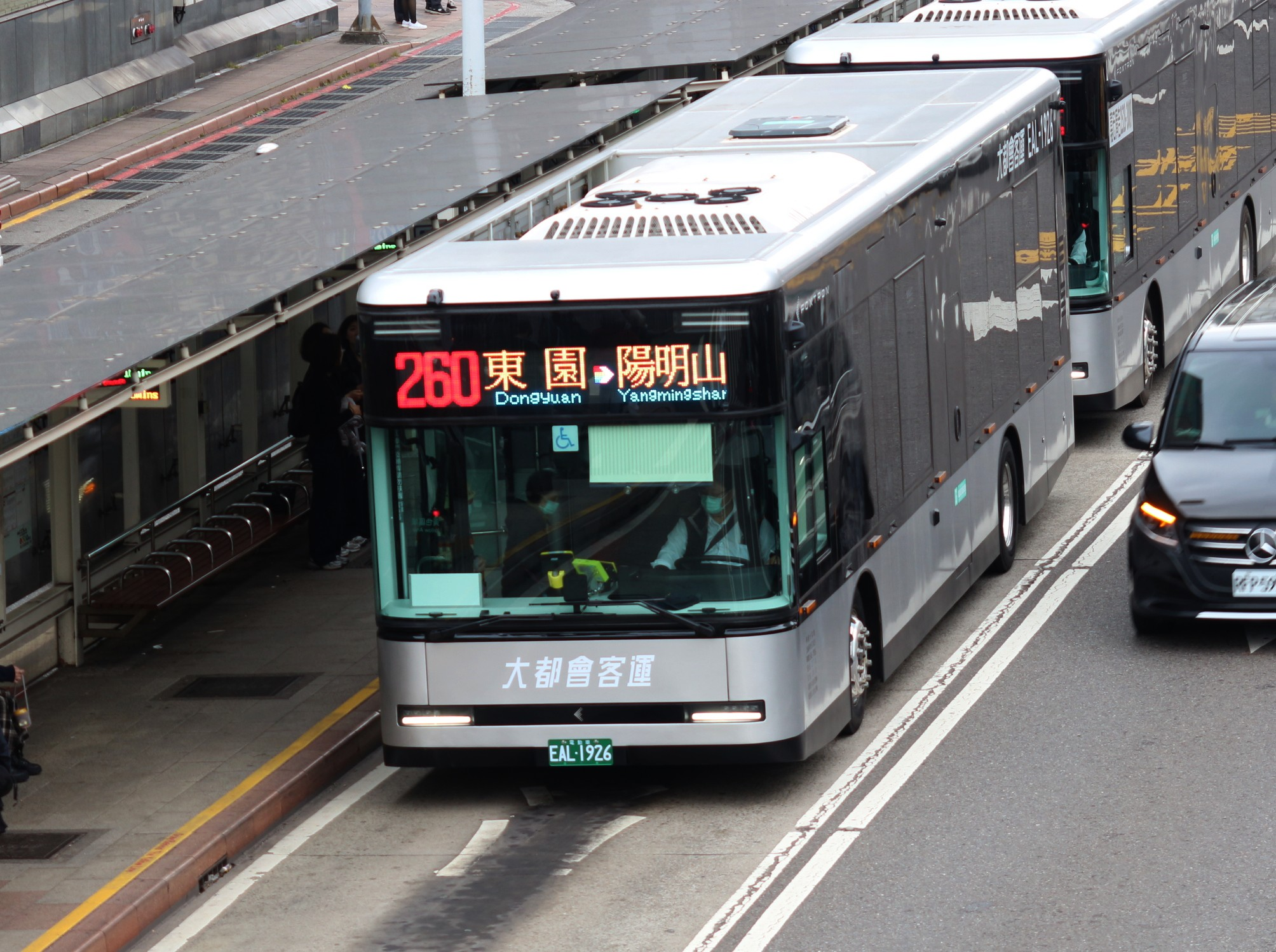
260 short line

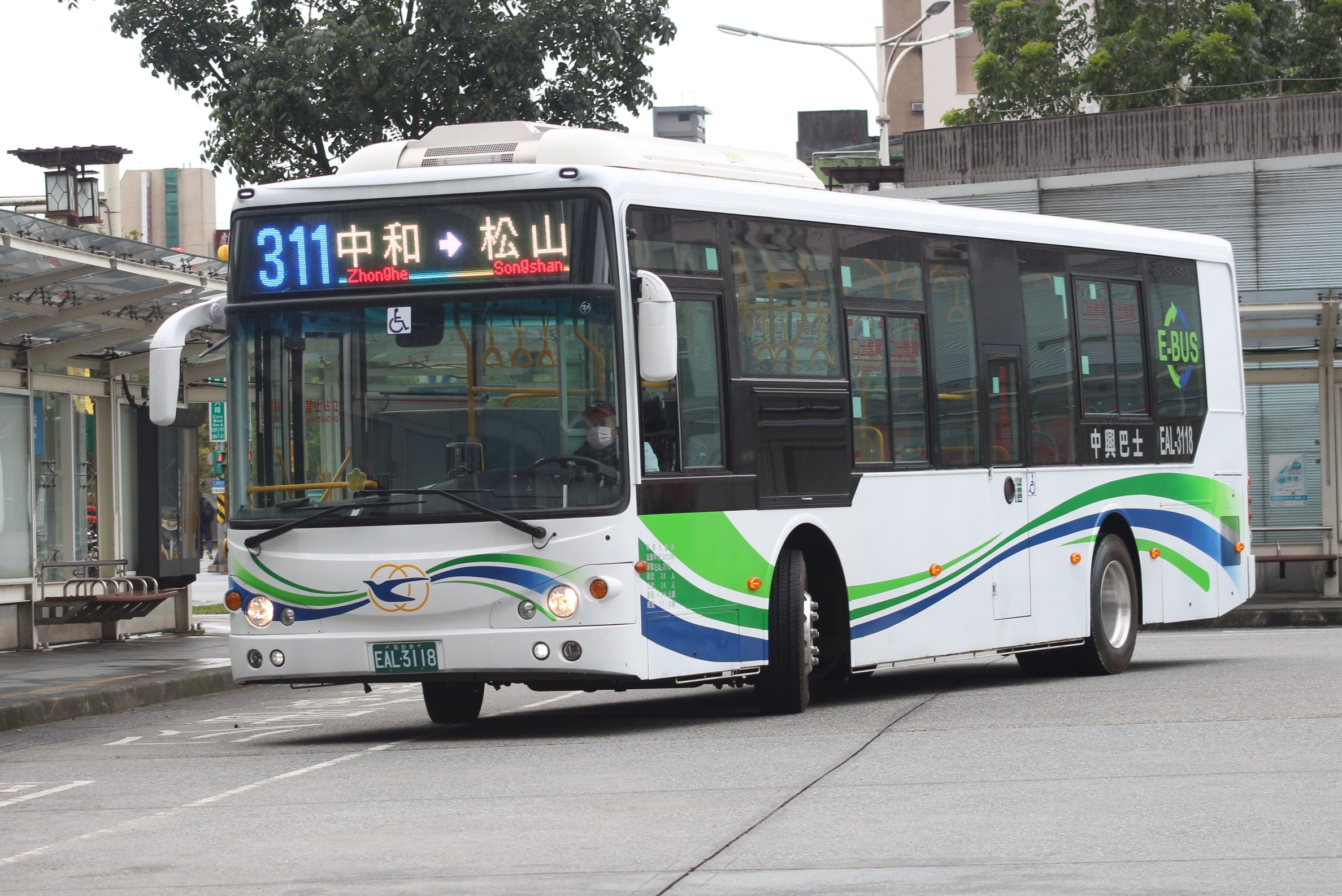
311 blue line

There are many sub-routes using the same route number but operating between different destinations. Usually the red is the main, primary route (正線). Other sub-routes are further divided, using the destination sign on the bus or an acrylic panel sign on the dashboard.

- Short line: only operates part of the main line, usually servicing the segment with the highest ridership. The route number is often colored in green.
  - For example, 260 (main line) runs between Yangmingshan and Dongyuan, while the 260 (short line) only runs half of the length between Yangmingshan and Taipei Railway Station.
- Secondary lines: usually overlaps with part of the primary route, with route numbers colored in green or blue, or marked with the major thoroughfares the routes serve. Often secondary lines will be renumbered.
  - Example: 245 (secondary line via Yu-min Road) and 245 (main line) used to serve between De-lin Institute and Taipei (the main line has been extended to Taipei City Hall), but the secondary route serves Yu-min Road, which the primary route does not. There's also 245 (Ching-shan Line) that serves the eastern portion of Ming-duh Road in Tucheng. 245 (secondary route via Yu-min Road) has been renumbered 656, while 245 (Ching-shan Line) has been renumbered 657.
  - Example: The 605 has a secondary route via Chung-yang Road and another one serving the Shin-tai-wu Road, using the new State Route 5.
  - Example: 643 (Jin-shiu—Fushing North Village) is renumbered from 642 (secondary route), while the route profile was originally different from 642 (primary route, Ching-tan—Fushing North Village).
    - Examples of secondary routes seceded from their respective primary routes and renumbered: 650/647, 656 and 657 with 245, 909/906.
- Direct service uses expressways or cuts shortcuts compared to the primary, main route.
  - Example: 214 direct (Chungho — National Defense Medical Center) uses Yungho Road in Yungho, while the primary route detours and serves Jhu-lin and Zhongzheng Roads.
  - Example: 212 direct (212 via Zhongxiao East Road) serves Zhongxiao East and West Roads, while the main line detours and serves Nangang, Xiangyang and Yungjih Roads.
- Left / right routes: separated by the direction traveling. Since it causes confusion, as of writing only Green 2 and 貓空遊園bus are separated into left and right lines.
  - Example: 672 used to be "254 left line", while 254 used to be "254 right line."
- Rapid routes: utilize expressways and/or freeways, and/or have limited stops. These routes have numbers start with a 9, or appear as secondary routes, often serving the same destinations.
  - Example: 605 express (Xizhi—Taipei Main Station) uses Huandong Boulevard and the National Freeway 1.
- Night owl service: a few routes have fixed departures after the end of regular service. Night owl fare s higher than regular fare.
  - As of now the routes that have night owl service include: 39, 212via Zhongxiao East Road, 236, 265 and 287.

Exceptions to route numbering and coloring

- 232: due to route relining, the primary route became 232 and the secondary route 232.
- 紅15: from 2004 to 2007, divided into the "main route" and "sub- route." The route that the new main route covered had less overlap with the original route, and was named R15; the new "sub-route" had more overlap with the original route, and was named 紅15.
- 311: In the past, was divided into three routes: 311 (main route), 311 (green sub-route), 311 (blue route). Later, 311 (汐止—中和；行經汐止大同路) was shortened, and became route 668 (汐止—公館). This new arrangement produced a route 311that had changed to become 行經汐止新台五路, which was later shortened, becoming route 675 (汐止—公館).311 (汐止—松江路；行經東湖) has become route 711. Therefore, there is now a route 311 (中和—松山；行經永福橋), but it is not a "main route."
- 216: Due to the "main route" being terminated, so this area's buses of 216 (displayed on the bus's LED number plate) and 216 (displayed on the bus's LED number plate); the sub-route being 216副 (displayed on the bus's LED word display unit) 以及216 (Yakeli routes number plate).

=== Irregular numberings ===
- Beside ordinary routes, for a short period of time, there were also special routes making use of "medium-sized air-conditioned buses". These buses went into service on 1 July 1976, and their route numbers were preceded with the word "中"or "Medium", such as 中1 and 中2. After 6 September 1979, these routes were reverted to ordinary routes, and were renamed with a first digit of "5" or "6."
- In the past, numbers such as 4, which sounds like the word "die" (死) in Chinese, and the number 13, which is unlucky in Western culture, were not used as route numbers. Even today, 4 is not used as the first digit of route names with three digits. While 13 is still never used as a route number on ordinary routes, there are routes named "red 13" and "green 13" (紅13, 綠13) on MRT shuttle buses.
- While the number 8 has positive connotations, it also refers to the historical Eighth Route Army. Due to these political reasons, 8 was not used as a route number, and 8 was never used as the first digit in three-digit route names. In route-names with two digits, 8 was first used in the 1980s as a first digit in route 80. Later on, after a county-controlled bus system was established, 8, 88, and 8## bus route numbers appeared. Also, a MRT shuttle bus is numbered "綠8" or "Green 8."
- As it connotes the February 28 Incident, the number 228 has never been used as a route number.

== See also ==
- EasyCard
