= National Defense Medical University =

Military academy in Taipei, Taiwan

- 國防醫學大學
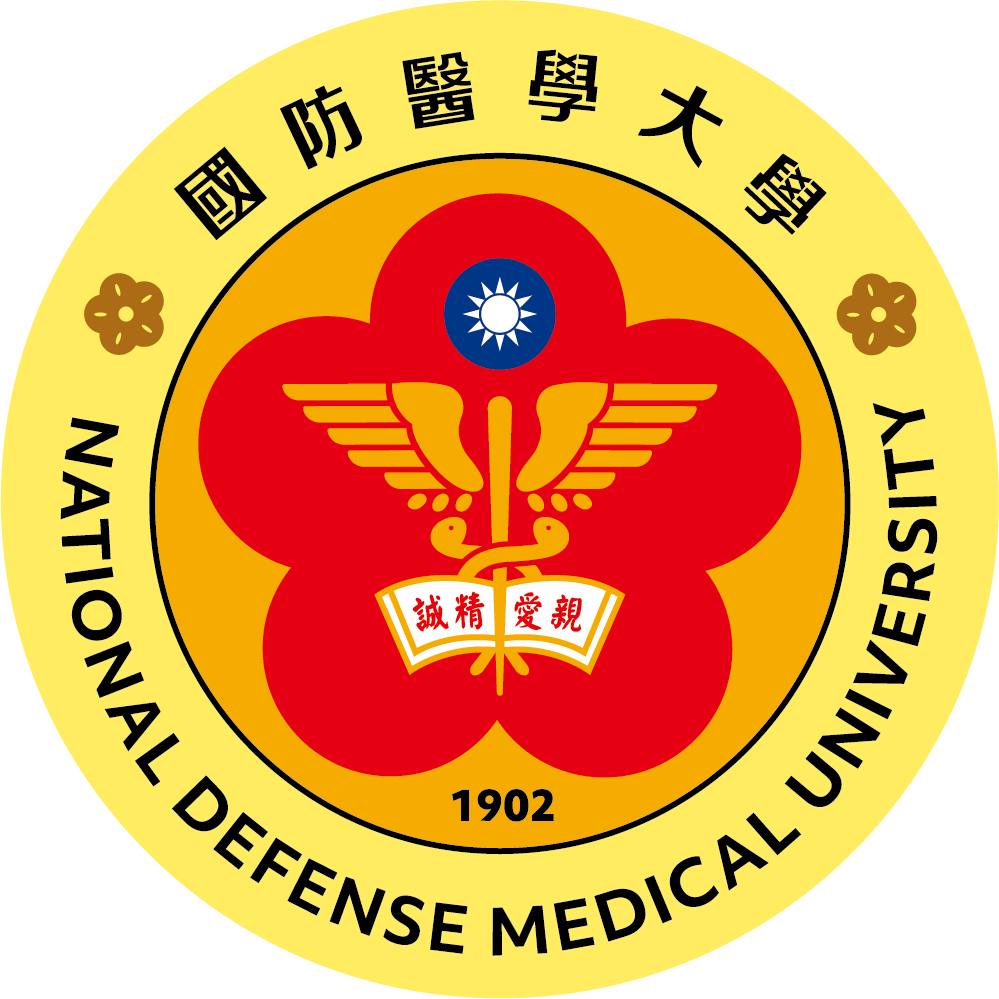
- Motto: 博愛忠真 (Pe̍h-ōe-jī: Phok-ài Tiong-chin)
- Motto in English: Fraternity, Faithfully
- Type: military academy
- Established: 1902 (reorganized in 1945 as National Defense Medical Center)
- President: Major General Chen Yuan-hao (陳元皓)
- Location: Neihu, Taipei, Taiwan
- Website: ndmctsgh.edu.tw

National Defense Medical University
- Flag
- Traditional Chinese: 國防醫學大學
- Simplified Chinese: 国防医学大学
- Literal meaning: National Defense Medical University
Transcriptions
Standard Mandarin
- Hanyu Pinyin: Guófáng Yīxué Dàxué
Southern Min
- Hokkien POJ: Kok-hông I-ha̍k Tāi-ha̍k

National Defense Medical University (NDMU), (Note: Chinese: 國防醫學大學; pinyin: Guófáng Yīxué Dàxué; Pe̍h-ōe-jī: Kok-hông I-ha̍k Tāi-ha̍k)) formerly National Defense Medical Center, (Note: Chinese: 國防醫學院; pinyin: Guófáng Yīxuéyuàn; Pe̍h-ōe-jī: Kok-hông I-ha̍k-īⁿ)) is a medical school in Taipei, Taiwan, affiliated with the Republic of China Armed Forces. It is responsible for the training of military doctors, nurses and other medical personnel.

== History ==
The former institute of the National Defense Medical Center, established by Yuan Shikai in Tianjin, China in 1902, was recognized as the first military school in Chinese history. This center was the amalgamation of the Army Medical College, the Wartime Health Personnel Training Center and its 13 branches in Shanghai, China on June 1, 1947, and later, in 1949, moved to Taipei, Taiwan.

In 1964, a residence for nurses' and students' was constructed on the Taipei campus. The Federation of Business and Professional Women's Clubs had raised more than $100,000 for the project, and the building was named for Minnie Lee Maffett. While travelling back from dedication ceremonies for the new facility, Maffett fell ill and died in Honolulu, Hawaii on May 26, 1964.

Following the annexation of the Tri-Service General Hospital, a total integration of basic and clinical department was achieved in 1983. In October, 1999, the school moved to the Neihu District of Taipei; in the next year, the Tri-Service General Hospital, the affiliated hospital, also moved to Neihu, where they were renamed collectively as the National Defense Medical Center.

== Academics ==
=== Doctorate programs ===
- Institute of Medical Sciences
- Institute of Life Science (formed by NDMC, Academia Sinica, and National Health Research Institutes)

=== Master programs ===
- Inst. of Dental Sciences
- Inst. of Pharmaceutical Sciences
- Inst. of Nursing
- Inst. of Public Health
- Inst. of Biology & anatomy
- Inst. of Physiology
- Inst. of Microbiology & Immunology
- Inst. of Pathology & Parasitology
- Inst. of Biochemistry
- Inst. of Pharmacology
- Inst. of Aerospace and Undersea Medicine

=== Undergraduate programs ===
- School of Medicine
- School of Pharmacy
- School of Dentistry
- School of Nursing
- School of Public Health

== Presidents ==
1. LTG Robert Kho-Seng Lim (1947–1953)
2. LTG Chih-Teh Loo (1953–1975)
3. LTG Chok-Yung Chai (M47) (1975–1984)
4. LTG Pan Shu-jen (M39) (1984–1989)
5. LTG T. H. Yin (尹在信) (M49) (1989–1991)
6. LTG Cheng-Ping Ma (馬正平) (M49) (1991–1993)
7. LTG Hsheng-Kai Lee (李賢鎧) (M59) (1993–1996)
8. LTG Kao-Liang Shen (沈國樑) (M59) (1996–2000)
9. MG Sun-Yuan Chang (張聖原) (M66) (2000–2002)
10. MG Hsian-Jenn Wang (王先震) (M66) (2003–2005)
11. MG Deh-Ming Chang (張德明) (M74) (2005-2011) member of American College of Rheumatology
12. MG Yu Ta-hsiung 于大雄 (2011–2013)
13. MG Huey-Kang Sytwu (2013–2018)
14. MG Cha Tai-lung (查岱龍 MD, PhD) (acting; 2018)
15. MG Lin Shih-hua (林石化) (2018)
16. LTC Cheng Shu-meng (鄭書孟) (acting; 2018–2019)
17. MG Lin Shih-hua (林石化) (2019)
18. MG Cha Tai-lung (查岱龍 MD, PhD) (2019–2023)
19. MG Chen Yuan-hao (陳元皓) (2023–present)

== Notable alumni ==
- Chang-Sheng Yin (尹長生) (M66), gynecologist, President of Kung-Ning General Hospital.
- Jeng Wei (魏崢) (M68), cardiac surgeon, former superintendent of Cheng Hsin Medical Center.
- Shinn-zong Lin (林欣榮) (M73), superintendent of Buddhist Tzu Chi Medical Center.
- Shang-Yi Chiang
- Chin Tseng Jean-li

== Teaching hospital ==
- Tri-Service General Hospital

== Practice institutions ==
- Taipei Veterans General Hospital
- Taichung Veterans General Hospital
- Kaohsiung Veterans General Hospital
- Chi Mei Medical Center
- Synpac-Kingdom Pharmaceutical Co.
- Yung Shin Pharm. Ind. Co.
- Veterans Pharmaceutical Plant
- Health Centers in the northern Taiwan

== See also ==
- List of universities in Taiwan
  - List of schools in the Republic of China reopened in Taiwan
