= Chen Wen-hui =

Taiwanese politician (1943–2023)

Chen Wen-hui MLY
- 陳文輝
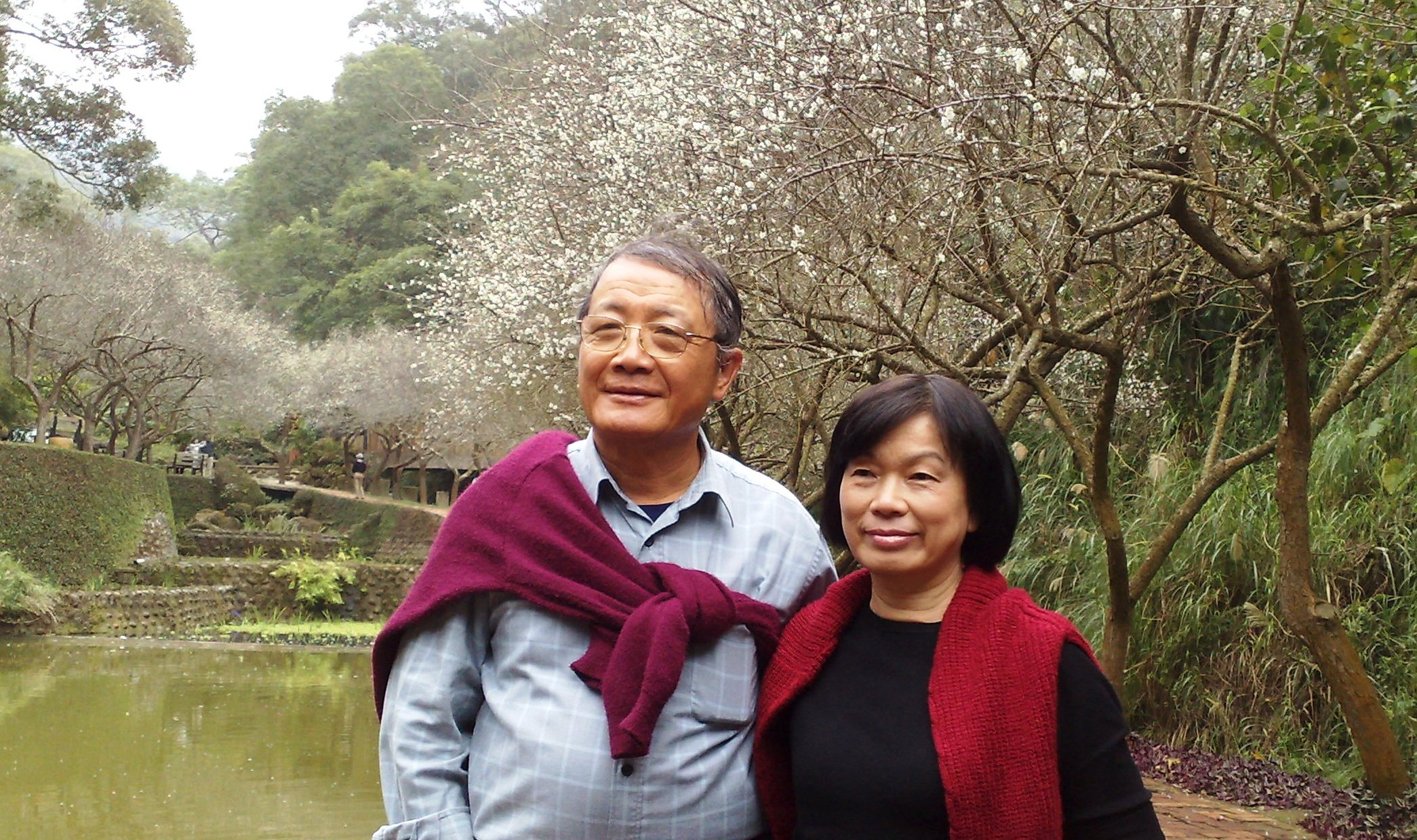
- Chen (left) and Lung Ying-tai in 2010

Member of the Legislative Yuan
- In office 1 February 1996 – 31 January 1999
- Constituency: Miaoli County

Personal details
- Born: 26 September 1943 Miaoli County, Taiwan, Japan
- Died: 14 December 2023 (aged 80)
- Party: Taiwan Independence Party (from 1998)
- Other political affiliations: Democratic Progressive Party (until 1998)
- Education: National Chengchi University
- Occupation: Politician

Chen Wen-hui (Chinese: 陳文輝; 26 September 1943 – 14 December 2023) was a Taiwanese educator and politician who served a single term on the Legislative Yuan, representing Miaoli County from 1996 to 1999.

== Education and teaching career ==
Chen Wen-hui completed a master's degree in education at National Chengchi University. He led the Hsinchu Normal College and Pingtung Normal Vocational College as principal.

== Political career ==
While serving as a campaign aide to Shih Hsing-jung, a candidate contesting the Hsinchu City mayoralty in 1985, Chen Wen-hui was accused of planning a large demonstration against election fraud that occurred in Hsinchu on 16 November 1985. Court proceedings against Chen and nine others began the next month, during which they claimed that they had been subject to torture. From prison, Chen launched his own campaign for a seat on the Miaoli County Council in January 1986. Though he was never present at any campaign functions, Chen finished first when votes were counted on 1 February. Two days later, Chen was sentenced to two years imprisonment. Despite a number of petitions on his behalf, Chen was unable to attend the 1 March 1986 inauguration of councilors, as the court refused to release him on bail. The Taiwan High Court heard an appeal of Chen's case on 7 April 1986, and upheld the earlier ruling. He contested a Legislative Yuan seat from Miaoli County as a member of the Democratic Progressive Party in 1995, and won. Chen lost reelection while affiliated with the Taiwan Independence Party in 1998. He also served as deputy education minister within the Taiwan Provincial Government and led the department of education within Taipei City Government.

== Personal life and death ==
Chen Wen-hui's wife, the potter Chen Yu-hsiu, established a kiln in Yuanli, Miaoli, in March 1984. During his imprisonment, Chen Wen-hui read about the flora of Taiwan. After his release, Chen created a botanical garden around his wife's pottery operations. The compound stretched six hectares and became known as Huataoyao. The largest kiln in Huataoyao was damaged during the 1999 Jiji earthquake. Huataoyao also had a restaurant.

Chen had a liver tumour in his 60s, and died of liver cancer on 14 December 2023, at the age of 80.
