= YouBike =

Taiwanese bicycle-sharing service

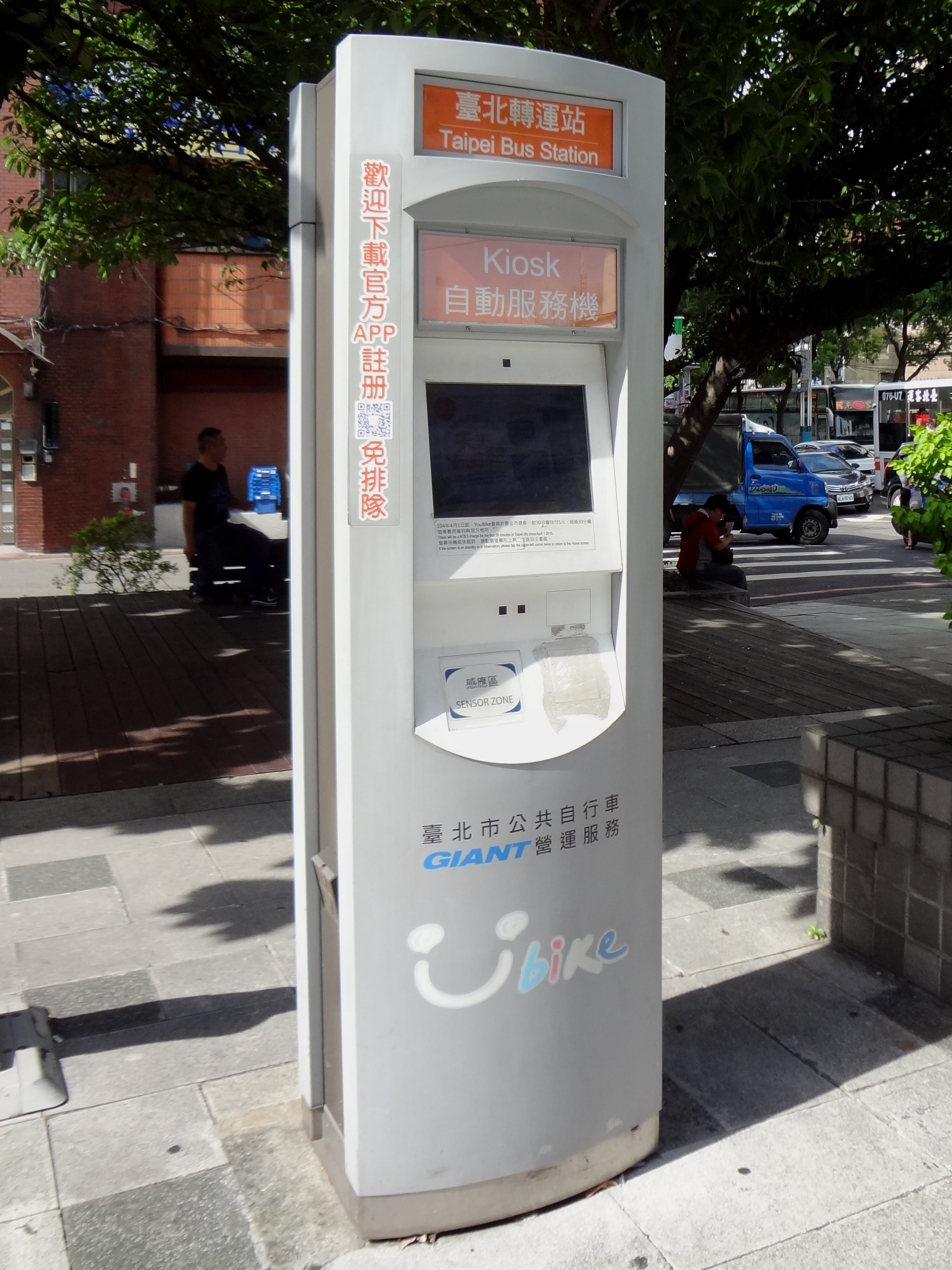
- YouBike 1.0 kiosk

YouBike (Chinese: 微笑單車; pinyin: Wéixiào Dānchē), originally Taipei Bike Sharing System, is a public bicycle sharing service offered by the Taipei City Department of Transportation in a BOT collaboration with local manufacturer Giant Bicycles. As of March 2025, YouBike service stations are available in the following areas in Taiwan: Taipei City, New Taipei City, Taoyuan City, Hsinchu County, Hsinchu City, Hsinchu Science Park, Miaoli County, Taichung City, Chiayi County, Chiayi City, Tainan City, Kaohsiung City, Pingtung County, and Taitung County. YouBike service stations are also available in Putian, China.

In 2014, the system saw 22 million rentals, double the 11 million rentals the previous year, with 196 rental stations circulating 6,046 bikes. As of February 2023, there are a total of 1,582 YouBike 1.0 rental stations and 5,246 YouBike 2.0 rental stations across Taiwan, with a total of 653 million rentals. And is planned that by 2026, the number of stations will increase from the current 1,338 to 2,000, and the number of bikes will increase from 16,562 to 27,500.

== History ==
Launched in 2009, the system initially saw an unexpectedly small number of daily users in the trial district of Xinyi. This prompted the city's Department of Transportation to expand the system along the Taipei Metro lines and into several more districts. The slow initial adoption of YouBike rentals was overcome through adjusting the business model, such as by lowering rates (including making the first 30 minutes free of charge), and increasing ways to open an account (online via the YouBike website or at the kiosks). In April 2015, the Taipei Department of Transportation began charging YouBike riders for the first 30 minutes of use.

In 2020, a new system, YouBike 2.0, was trialed near National Taiwan University. The new system allows bike renting with only smartphones and reduces the limitations of station infrastructure. The government hopes that the new system will help build a larger scale of bike rental network. The new, white, 2.0 system is now found across Taiwan.

In 2021, the Taipei City government pledged to retire all of YouBike 1.0 by the end of 2022 due to positive feedback on YouBike 2.0. YouBike 1.0 service in Taipei City was retired in December 2022.

== Bikes ==
The yellow bikes are normal ones while there are a smaller number of orange bikes that are electric and offer pedal assist. They are more expensive to use.

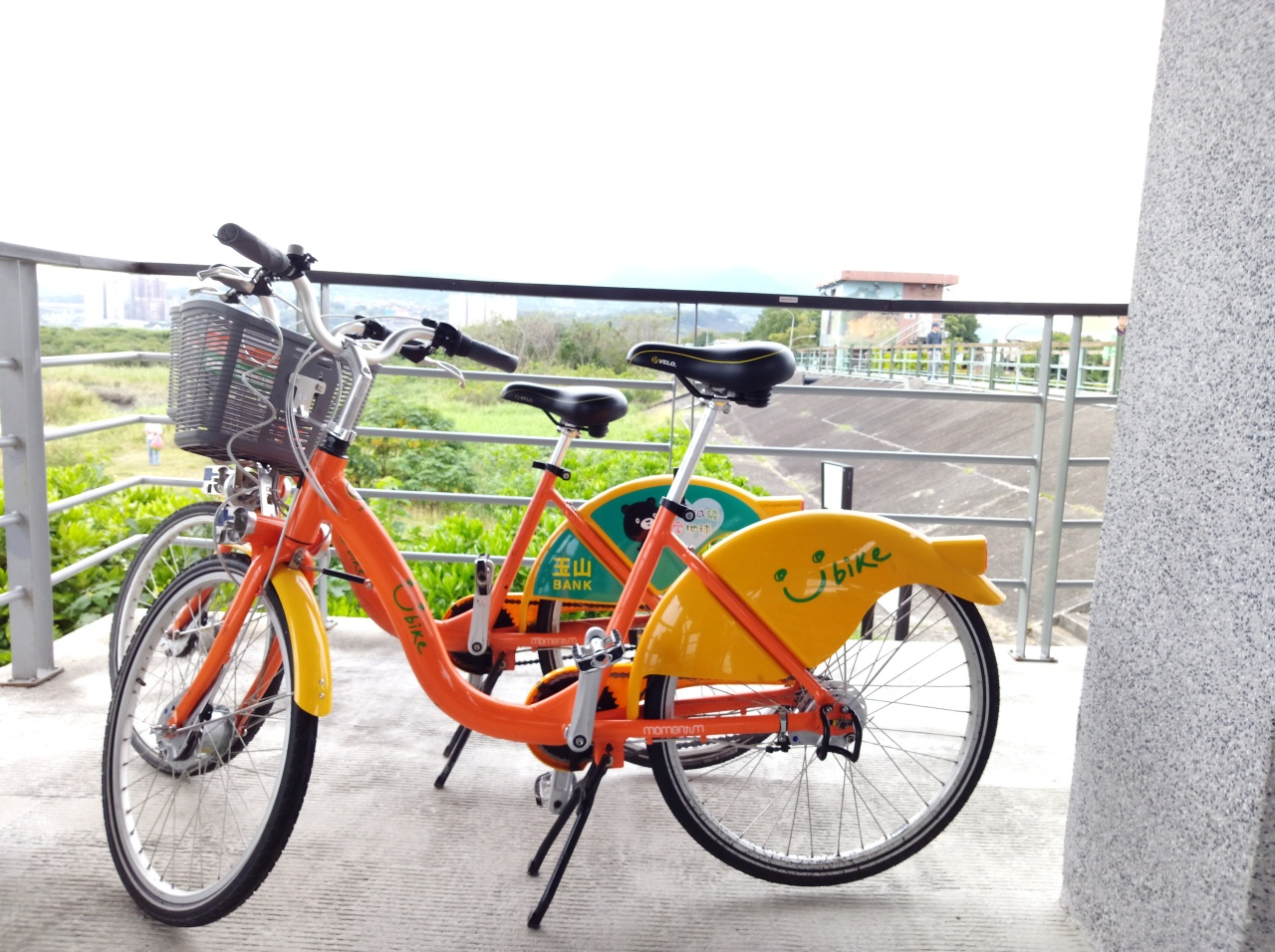
Two YouBikes 1.0 in Taipei

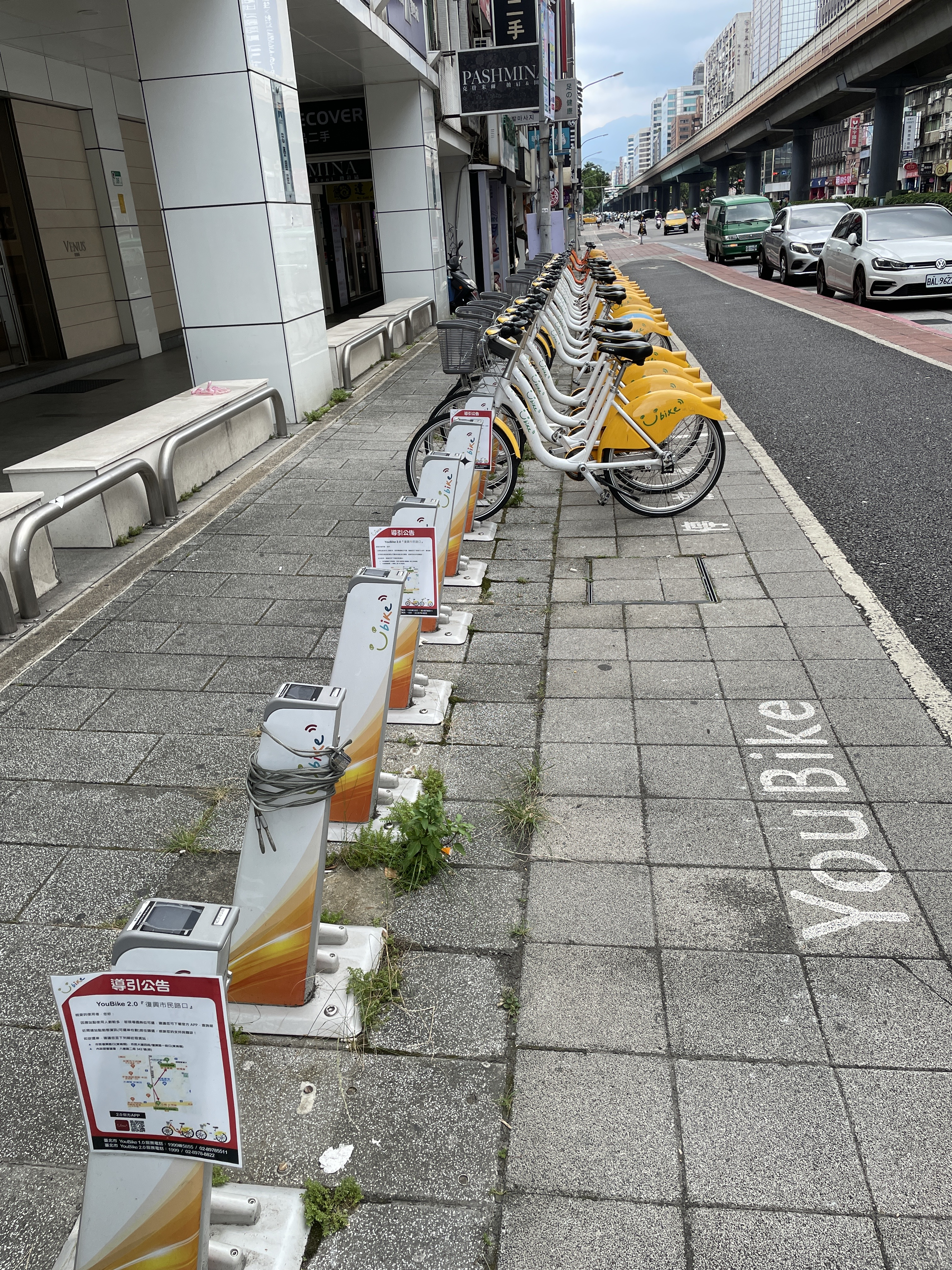
YouBike 2.0 Station in Taipei

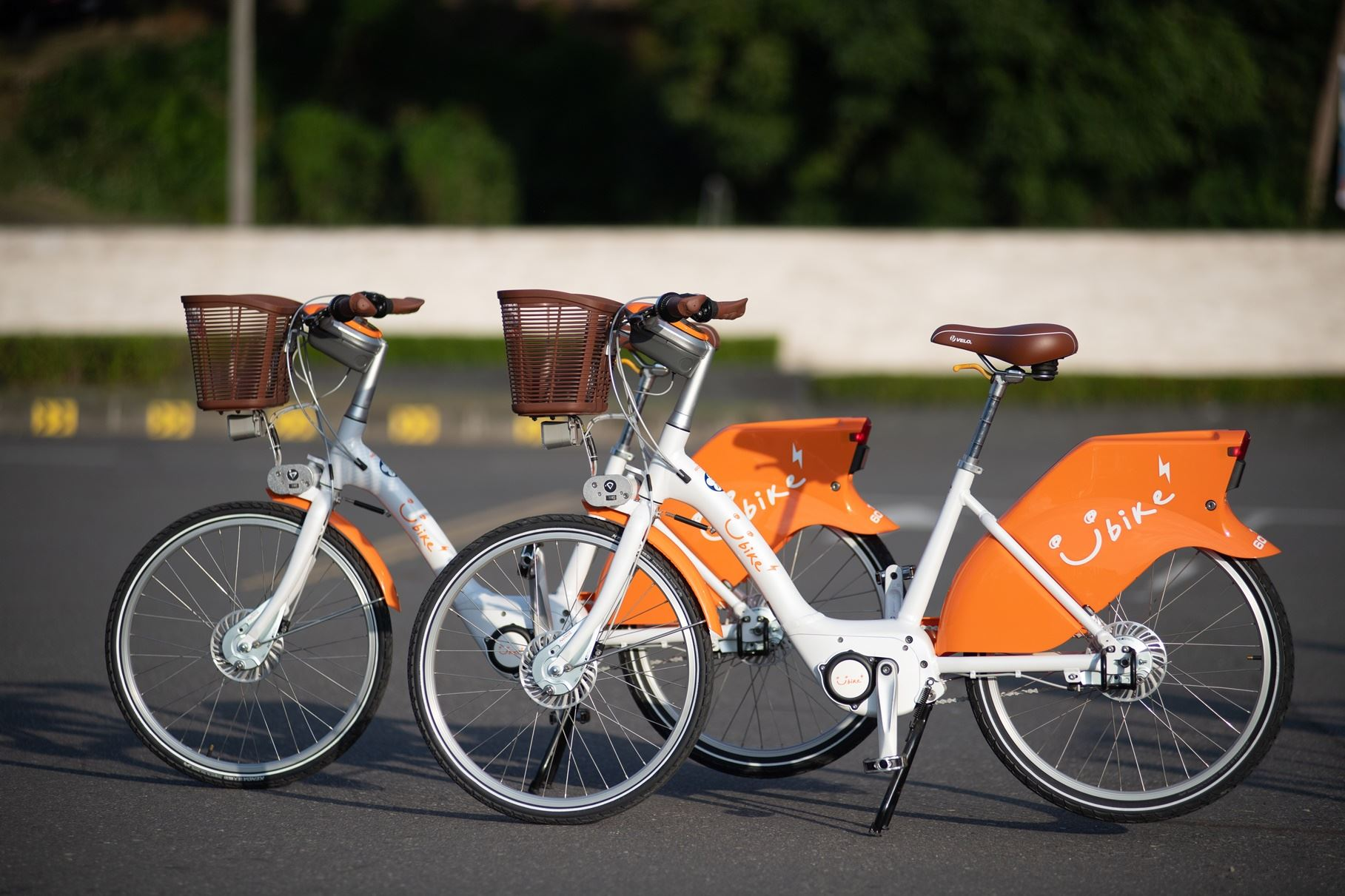
YouBike 2.0E (Electric bicycle)

According to the company, each of the system's bikes costs about NT$10,000 (US$330) because they are designed to withstand frequent use. The bicycles are built to be used 13 times a day on average, much more often than the twice daily use that most other bicycles average. Each bicycle has an RFID tag for vehicle tracking and theft prevention.

There is a 15-minute renewal restriction period at the station to which the bike was returned.

== Fees ==
The cost of YouBike rental varies between areas in Taiwan, depending on whether the local government offers subsidies. In most jurisdictions, renting a non-electric YouBike 2.0 rental costs NT$10 per 30 minutes for the first 4 hours, NT$20 per 30 minutes in hour 4-8, and NT$40 per 30 minutes after 8 hours before subsidies.

=== Government subsidies ===
- NT$20 subsidy for first 60 minutes (first hour free): Taoyuan City (except 2.0E)
- NT$10-12 subsidy for first 30 minutes (first 30 minutes free): Taipei City (except 2.0E),, New Taipei City (except 2.0E), Miaoli County, Taichung City, Chiayi County, Chiayi City, Pingtung County, and Taitung County
- NT$5 subsidy for first 30 minutes: Tainan City (with Tainan Civil Card 臺南市市民卡 only), and Kaohsiung City

Some jurisdictions also offer transfer discounts. For example, using an iPass to rent a YouBike in Kaohsiung and then transferring to the Kaohsiung MRT or bus, gives an additional NT$5 discount, for a total of NT$10 off (i.e. the first 30 minutes of using YouBike are free).

No other fees, such as a deposit or membership fee are required to use YouBike.
