= Versuni =

Dutch consumer electronics company

- Formerly: Philips Consumer Lifestyle
- Type: Private
- Industry: Electronics
- Founded: 2021 (as Versuni)
- Headquarters: Amsterdam, Netherlands
- Key people: Véronique Pauwels (President, CEO)
- Products: Consumer electronics, small appliances
- Brands: Philips (under license from Philips), Gaggia, Saeco (under license from Evoca), Senseo, L'Or, Preethi
- Revenue: ▲€2.2 billion (2021)
- Owner: Hillhouse Investment
- Website: www.versuni.com

Versuni (formerly Philips Consumer Lifestyle) is a privately owned Dutch company, headquartered in Amsterdam, which produces consumer electronics and small appliances. Formerly a subsidiary of Dutch electronics conglomerate Philips, it was sold to Chinese private equity firm Hillhouse Investment in 2021. Versuni sells their products under the Philips brand name (under license), as well as under the brands Preethi, Gaggia and Saeco (under license from Italian coffee-maker manufacturer Evoca Group), Senseo and L'Or and Baristina.

== History ==
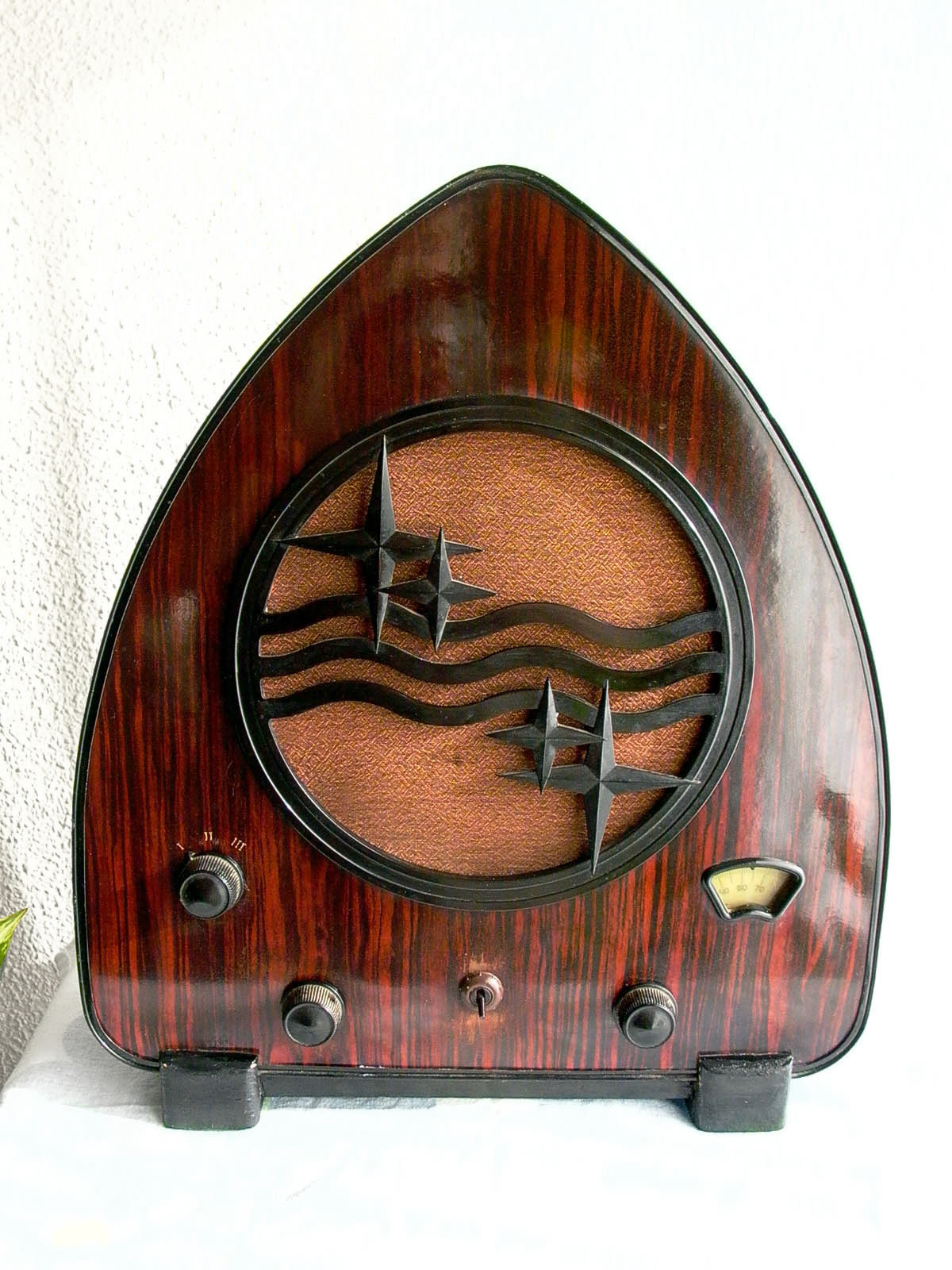
Philips radio receiver, Model 930A (1931)

While Philips' first product was manufactured in 1891, the first product that would fit in the Consumer Electronics division was a television, experimentally manufactured in 1925. In 1927, Philips began producing radios. Only five years later, Philips had sold one million of them. One other major product release came in 1963, when the Compact Cassette was introduced.

After Philips Consumer Electronics acquired companies as Magnavox and Sylvania in the late-1970s, Philips managed to sell their 100-millionth TV-set in 1984.

Throughout the 1990s, increasing competition from East Asian manufacturers (initially Japanese, then Korean and Chinese) led to a general erosion in market share, particularly in developing markets such as India. As a result, consumer electronics became an increasingly smaller part of their business, leading to a variety of divestments.

In 2008, Philips transferred its American television business to Japanese company Funai, allowing them to sell and distribute TVs under the Philips and Magnavox brands for the American market. In 2010, their Indian television business was transferred to Videocon, who now make Philips TVs for the Indian market under license. That same year, their mainland Chinese television business was transferred to Chinese state-controlled company TPV Technology.

In 2012, Philips spun-off its loss-making TV business globally to TP Vision, a joint-venture with Chinese state-controlled company TPV Technology (who had previously held the license to sell Philips TVs in the mainland Chinese market). This excluded their American, Indian and Chinese television businesses, which had already been transferred to other licensees (as above). Philips initially held a 30% stake in the joint venture, which was sold to TPV Technology in 2014.

Philips announced in January 2013 that it agreed to sell its consumer electronics division to Japan-based Funai Electric Co. for €150 million (US$201.8 million). This would leave mainly consumer products for personal care and health in this division of Philips. However, in October 2013, Philips announced that it would not proceed with the sale, instead initiating litigation against Funai, alleging breach of contract by Funai.

In 2021, Philips sold their Domestic Appliances business to Hillhouse Investment, a Chinese private-equity firm controlled by entrepreneur Zhang Lei, for €3.7 billion (US$4.37 billion). As part of the deal, the new company received the right to use the Philips brand name for consumer electronics for a period of 15 years following the deal, at an estimated cost of €700 million over that time period. In 2023, the company was rebranded as Versuni.

Versuni has begun to target India as a key growth market, with the opening of a factory manufacturing air fryers and garment steamers in Ahmedabad in 2024. It is estimated that this will increase the proportion of products Versuni sells in India that are locally manufactured from 70% to 90%.

In May 2024, Bloomberg reported that Versuni was exploring the possibility of listing their Indian business, which could value it at US$800 million, and that they were in early stages of discussion with investment banks regarding this.

== Products ==
Versuni primarily sells small appliances under the Philips brand (under license from Philips). These include:

- Air fryers
- Rice cookers
- Blenders
- Kettles
- Clothes irons
- Clothes steamer
- Vacuum cleaners
- Air purifiers

Versuni also sells domestic coffee makers, under the Philips, Gaggia, Saeco, Senseo and L'Or brands.

They sell a variety of home appliances in India under the Preethi brand, including mixer-grinders.

Philips-branded electric toothbrushes and rotary shavers are not made by Versuni, but continue to be manufactured and sold by Philips itself under its Personal Care division.
