= Shen Meng-ru =

Taiwanese physiologist and academic

- 沈孟儒
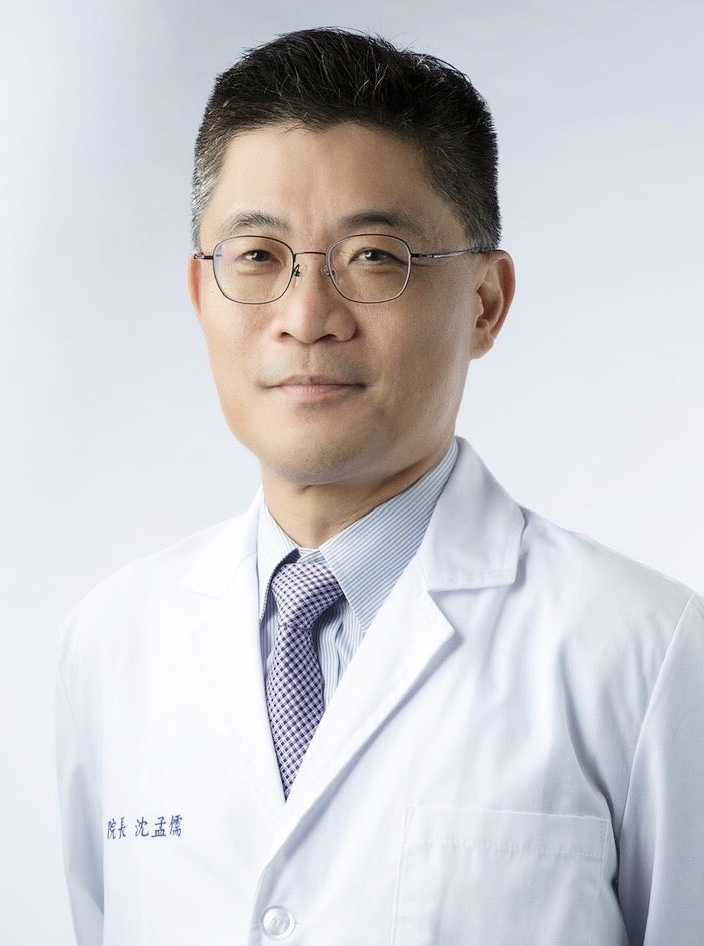

18th President of National Cheng Kung University
- Incumbent
- Assumed office February 1, 2023
- Preceded by: Su Hui-zhen

Personal details
- Born: 1966 (age 59–60) Tainan, Taiwan
- Education: Kaohsiung Medical University (MD); University of Oxford (DPhil)

Shen Meng-ru (Chinese: 沈孟儒; pinyin: Shěn Mèngrú; born 1966) is a Taiwanese physiologist and academic who has served as the 18th president of National Cheng Kung University (NCKU) since 2023. He is a researcher in genomic medicine, drug development, molecular biology, and cellular physiology.

== Early life and education ==
Shen was born in Tainan in 1966, and graduated from National Tainan First Senior High School. He attended medical school at Kaohsiung Medical University, earning his Doctor of Medicine (M.D.) in 1993. He then completed graduate studies in England at the University of Oxford, where he earned his Doctor of Philosophy (D.Phil.) in physiology in 2002. His doctoral dissertation was titled, "Volume-regulatory mechanisms in human cervical cancer cells," and was supervised by Oxford professor Clive Ellory.

== Career ==
Since 1998, Chen has been an attending physician in the Department of Obstetrics and Gynecology of National Cheng Kung University.

From 2011 to 2012, Shen was an elected fellow of Corpus Christi College, Oxford, and was a distinguished professor of pharmacology, obstetrics, and gynecology at the NCKU College of Medicine. He served as the college's associate dean for research from 2013 to 2019 and as chairman of the university's Department of Pharmacology from 2014 to 2017. He was deputy superintendent (2016–2019) then superintendent (2019–2022) of National Cheng Kung University Hospital before being named the next president of National Cheng Kung University, taking office in February 2023. His election as president of the university was announced on October 30, 2022.
