= NCKU IMBA =

Taiwanese business college

National Cheng Kung University Institute of International Management
- Motto: IIMBA UP!
- Type: Graduate Business School
- Established: 1956
- Dean: Yu-Hern Chang
- Postgraduates: Masters, PhD
- Location: Tainan City, R.O.C.
- Campus: Kuang Fu

The Institute of International Management is the business school of National Cheng Kung University located in Tainan City, Taiwan. NCKU offers full-time, part-time, and executive programs, as well as partnering programs with schools in Canada, US, and Taiwan granting the M.B.A. and Ph.D.

NCKU has historically been ranked as one of the top institutions in Taiwan. Alumni from the Institute of International Management hold leadership positions in for-profit, nonprofit, governmental, and academic institutions around the world. In 2011, College of Management was accredited by AACSB

== History ==
The College of Management at National Cheng Kung University (NCKU) was founded in 1956 and since has established itself as an educational institution both internationally and in Taiwan (Republic of China).

In 2001 the Ministry of Education recognized the College of Management at NCKU as "first place" as well as "excellent" in 2005.

The College of Management consists of 5 departments and 5 institutes offering Bachelor's, Master's and Ph.D. degrees, including Executive MBA (EMBA) and International MBA (IMBA) degrees. As of fall 2005, the college possessed more than 150 faculty members with total enrollment of almost three thousand students. Two buildings, with a total floor space of 26,400 square metres, provide the college's faculty members and students with an excellent research and learning environment.

In 2011, College of Management was accredited by AACSB

== NCKU IIM academic programs ==
NCKU offers an International MBA, and an International PhD.

=== IMBA Programs ===
The International Master of Business Administration (IMBA) Program was founded in 2003.

=== The PhD Program ===
In addition to its MBA program, the school also offers a PhD program in International Management. Thirty Ph.D. students, 6 of whom are Taiwanese and 24 other students from America, Bangladesh, Cambodia, Canada, Germany, India, Indonesia, Jordan, Malaysia, Myanmar, Russia, Solomon Islands, and Vietnam are attending this international Ph.D. program.

== Students and culture ==
Approximately 160 students are enrolled in the program with 20% of the student body being local Taiwanese. The remaining students, are made up of internationals from over 40 different countries, having representatives from Asia, Australasia, Africa, both North and South America as well as Europe.

== Research and academics ==
All of NCKU IIMBA's professors perform both teaching and research. Most classes combine lectures on theory, discussion of case studies, as well as student group projects.

== Rankings ==
National Cheng Kong University is consistently ranked among the top 300 schools in the world.
According to QS World University Rankings in 2020 NCKU ranked #225 worldwide.

== Location and facilities ==
Lecture Rooms, Research Center, Dormitories and Sports Center.

To satisfy various kind of student interest, the sports facility is equipped with various modern facilities, such as main court, general court, swimming pool, gym, tennis court, basketball court, squash court, martial art room, dance room, aerobic room, international conference hall, etc.

Computer and Network Center: Established in 1967, year to year the services have been improved. Starting in 1988, the center began to plan and implement the installation of a fiber-optic network to improve network service. Furthermore, Taiwan government also selected NCKU Computer and Network Center as TANET Tainan branch center to administer internet in the southern part of Taiwan. The center provides students with E-mail account, webmail, computer course, consultation, and classroom for distance education. Besides, it also takes care of the whole network on campus, including dormitory network, wireless network, TANet/I1, Tanet2/I2, NCKU Proxy, NCKU Net News, ADSL, VPN and Dial-up network connection.

Students Associations: Presently more than 131 student associations are active and available for students to choose from. These associations are unique and can be categorized into Departmental, Scholarly, Art, Recreational, Service Associations, Athletic and Social Associations.
