= NCKU =

NCKU may refer to:

- National Cheng Kung University (NCKU), a university in Taiwan, which uses its current name since 1956
- Zhejiang University, a university in mainland China, which used the name National Chekiang University (NCKU) from 1928 to 1950
