= Kaohsiung Medical University =

Private university in Sanmin, Kaohsiung, Taiwan

Coordinates: 22.64752°N 120.31043°E

- 高雄醫學大學
- Former name: Kaohsiung Medical College (1954–1999)
- Motto: 樂學至上，研究第一 堅忍自強，勵學濟世
- Type: Private medical school
- Established: October 16, 1954; 72 years ago
- Founder: Tu Tsung-ming
- President: Ming-lung Yu
- Faculty: 696 (2019)
- Students: 6,621 (2023)
- Location: Sanmin, Kaohsiung, Taiwan
- Campus: Urban
- Website: www.kmu.edu.tw

Kaohsiung Medical University
- Traditional Chinese: 高雄醫學大學
- Simplified Chinese: 高雄医学大学
Transcriptions
Standard Mandarin
- Hanyu Pinyin: Gāoxióng Yīxué Dàxué
Southern Min
- Hokkien POJ: Ko-hiông I-ha̍k Tāi-ha̍k

The Kaohsiung Medical University (KMU; Chinese: 高雄醫學大學) is a private medical school in Sanmin District, Kaohsiung, Taiwan. Founded in 1954, it is the country's oldest private medical school.

Kaohsiung Medical hosts MD, PhD, and master's degree programs in medicine and other sciences. It consists of eight academic colleges, including those dedicated to life sciences, pharmaceutical sciences, nursing, and dentistry. The university also houses seven affiliated teaching hospitals, such as Chung-Ho Memorial Hospital.

== History ==
=== Founding ===
The school was established as "Kaohsiung Medical College" in 1954 by pharmacologist Tu Tsung-ming, who became its first dean. It was the first private medical college established in Taiwan. The college formally opened on October 16, 1954, after its board of trustees had been organized on July 21 and appointed Tu as dean on October 3. Former Kaohsiung mayor Chen Chi-chuan donated more than eleven jia of land for the school. Chen and Tu, along with physicians Ho Li-tung and Chiu Hsien-tien, and 132 others, were its joint founders. Chen was elected the first chairman of the board of trustees.

The first class comprised 61 students in the medical program. During its early years, the college became particularly associated with research in tropical medicine and snake-venom proteins. The college expanded beyond medicine in 1957, establishing a pharmacy department and a dental school.

The college's affiliated teaching hospital opened on June 16, 1957. At first, its outpatient department occupied rented premises on Liuhe 2nd Road, while inpatient beds, operating rooms and other hospital facilities were housed in the college's second teaching and research building. In 1958, the college established the four-year Mountain Physician Medical Training Program (山地醫師醫學專修科), which enrolled two cohorts of 30 Indigenous high-school graduates in 1958 and 1959 with public funding and trained them to return to practice in Indigenous communities.

=== Expansion and graduate education (1966–1998) ===
Tu remained dean until September 1966, completing a twelve-year tenure. A three-year associate nursing program was established in 1968 and was succeeded by a four-year School of Nursing in 1975. Construction of the affiliated hospital's first purpose-built medical building began in June 1968, and the first phase opened in June 1970, allowing the outpatient department to move from Liuhe Road and inpatient facilities to be transferred from the college's teaching buildings into the new hospital complex. When the hospital complex was completed in 1970, it was named Chung-Ho Memorial Hospital in memory of Chen Chung-ho, the father of founding board chairman Chen Chi-chuan.

During the deanship of Hsieh Hsien-chen from 1973 to 1991, the college expanded from four academic departments to twelve and established six master's and three doctoral programs. In August 1977, the college used its existing Tropical Medicine Research Center as the basis for a master's-level Graduate Institute of Tropical Medicine; a doctoral program was added in 1981, when the institute was renamed the Graduate Institute of Medicine. The pharmacy program established a master's program in 1982 and a doctoral program in 1988. Dentistry established its master's program in 1985 and its doctoral program in 1990, while a master's program in nursing began in 1991. In 1983, the school also established a five-year post-baccalaureate medical program for students who had already completed bachelor's degrees.

In 1995, the medical school signed agreements with Harvard Medical School and the Harvard School of Public Health for a shared partnership among faculty, researchers, physicians and students and cooperation in biomedical research and education. On November 16, 1998, the affiliated hospital began operating Kaohsiung Municipal Siaogang Hospital under commission from the Kaohsiung city government.

=== University status (1999–present) ===
In August 1999, the Ministry of Education approved the institution's elevation from a medical college to a university, and Kaohsiung Medical College was renamed "Kaohsiung Medical University". The reorganization created six colleges, including the College of Medicine. The College of Pharmacy was established on August 1, 1999, and the College of Nursing was also founded that year. The university later established the College of Humanities and Social Sciences on August 1, 2012.

On January 1, 2010, Chung-Ho Memorial Hospital began operating Kaohsiung Municipal Ta-Tung Hospital under commission from the city government. That management agreement expired on December 31, 2024. The medical system began operating the rebuilt Kaohsiung Municipal Cijin Hospital under commission on October 1, 2014. Plans for a new university-affiliated hospital in Gangshan District were approved by the university in December 2014; after subsequent government approvals and construction, Kaohsiung Medical University Gangshan Hospital received its operating license on April 17, 2024, and began trial operations on April 22.

== Teaching ==
As of October 2013, KMU has a student-faculty ratio of 13.1:1. The university offers 6 bachelor's, 10 master's and 5 doctoral degree programs.

Up to NT$35 million of scholarships and student grants are offered each year. KMU is the only medical academic institution offering graduate-entry medical programs in Taiwan (the Faculty of Post-Bachelor's degree of Medicine), an admission system based on North American medical institutes.

== Research ==
KMU is associated with eleven major research centers and networks, and is engaged in research partnerships with other universities, government and industry in Taiwan and other countries.

- The MedicoGenomic Research Center of Kaohsiung Medical University has successfully developed colorectal cancer diagnostic chip and determined molecular markers for tumors (including DNA and RNA markers) which can be used in the laboratory or clinical tests.
- The Functional Proteomics Research Center is performing systematic research on cellular proteins' types, functions, differences in expression, and modification after translation.
- The Chinese Herbal Medicine and New Drug Research Center is devising new drug models for herbal medicines and developing herbal prescriptions that meet international standards.
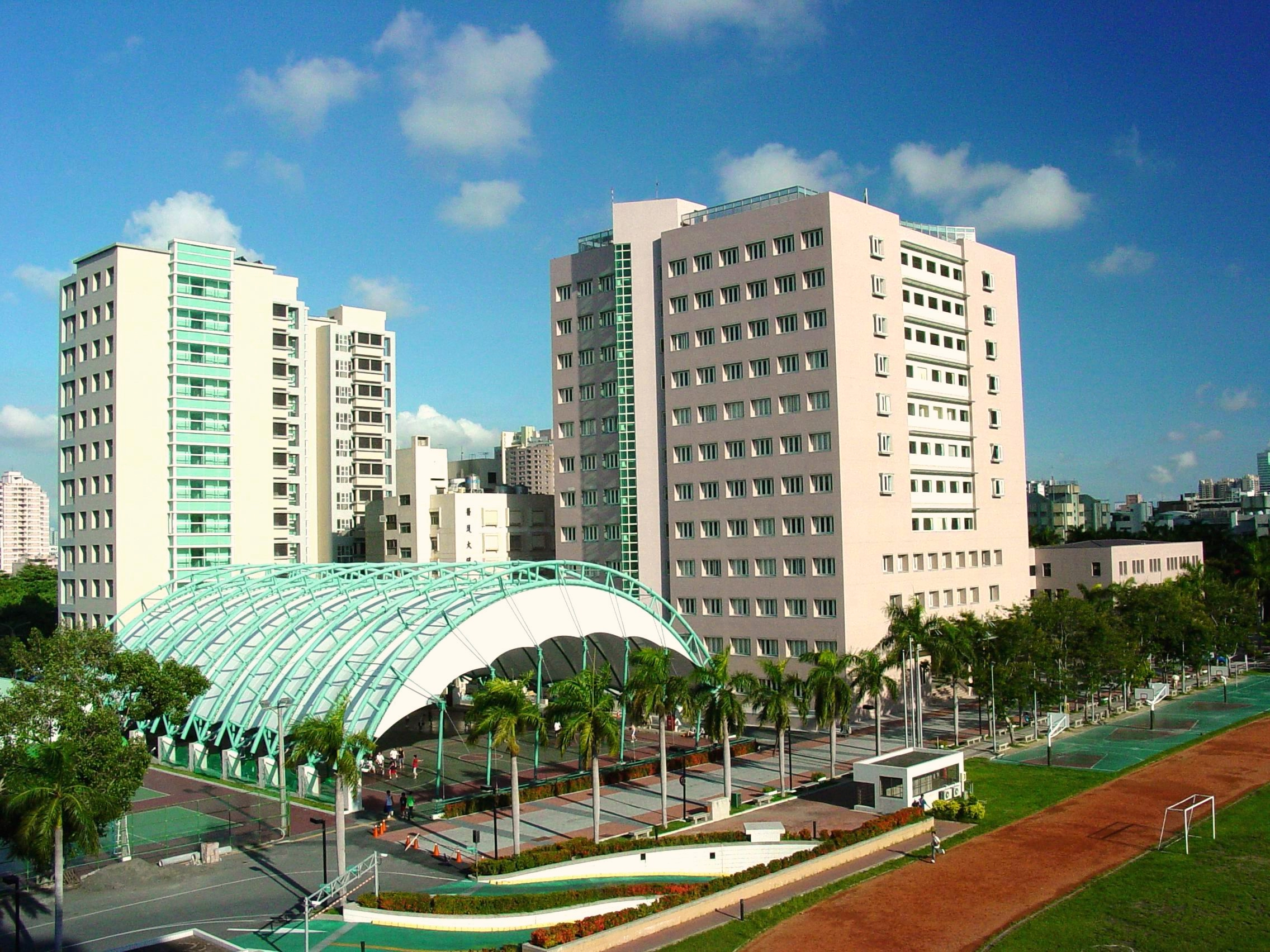
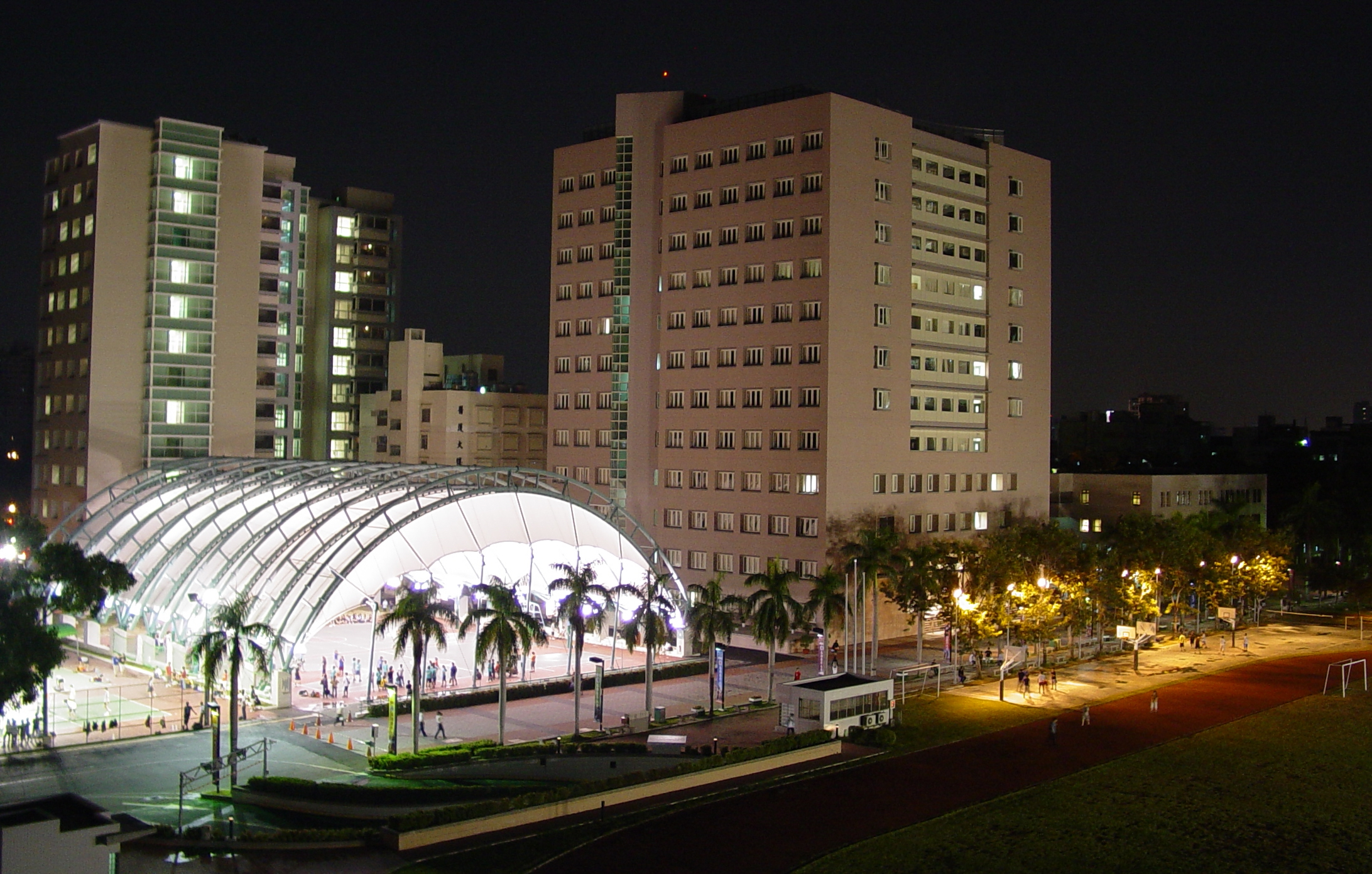
  Main campus in Sanmin District

=== Post-Baccalaureate/Bachelor Degree of Medicine ===
Established in the spring of 1983, the program enrolls applicants with recognized undergraduate/bachelor's degrees. Admission into the program is based on a two-staged PBD Medicine Entrance Examination (consisting of a written exam and an interview), which takes place annually in May. Subjects of written examination include English, Biology, Biochemistry, Chemistry and Physics. Enrollment into the program is highly competitive with admission rate in 2011 approximately 4.3%. The faculty currently enrolls 261 students.

Post-Bachelor's degree of Medicine is a four-year program. The program consists of two-year pre-clerkship (77 credits) and two-year clerkship. Pre-clerkship consists of 16 integrated blocks and problem-based learning (PBL). Individual and population health, ethical practices, and related issues are integrated into and emphasized, where appropriate, in all phases of the pre-clerkship. Each block consists of two semesters each with at least one mid-term written examination and ends with a final examination that concludes each semester of a block.

== Departments ==
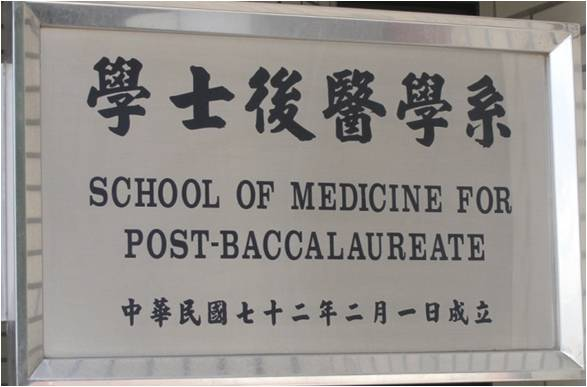
The Faculty of Medicine for Post-Baccalaureate

=== College of Medicine ===
- School of Medicine
- School of Medicine for Post-Baccalaureate/Post-Bachelor's degree of Medicine
- School of Sports Medicine
- School of Respiratory Care
- School of Renal Care
- Graduate Institute of Medicine
- Graduate Institute of Biochemistry
- Graduate Institute of Pharmacology
- Graduate Institute of Medical Genetics
- Graduate Institute of Physiology and Molecular Medicine

=== College of Dentistry ===
- School of Dentistry
- School of Dental Hygiene
- Graduate Institute of Dental Sciences
- Graduate Institute of Oral Health Sciences

=== College of Pharmacy ===
- School of Pharmacy
- School of Fragrance and Cosmetics
- Graduate Institute of Pharmaceutical Sciences
- Graduate Institute of Natural Products
- Graduate Institute of Clinical Pharmacy

=== College of Nursing ===
- School of Nursing
- Graduate Institute of Nursing
- Graduate Institute of Gender Studies

=== College of Health Science ===
- School of Public Health
- Graduate Institute of Public Health
- Graduate Institute of Occupational Safety and Health
- School of Medical Sociology and Social Work
- School of Psychology
- Graduate Institute of Behavioral Sciences
- School of Biomedical Laboratory Science
- School of Occupational Therapy
- School of Physical Therapy
- School of Medical Radiology
- School of Medical Information Management

=== College of Life Sciences ===
- School of Medical and Applied Chemistry
- School of Biomedical Science and Environmental Biology
- Department of Biotechnology

== Notable alumni ==
- Chang Po-ya (MD'68), Minister of Health (1990–1997), President of the Control Yuan (2014–2020), and founder of the Non-Partisan Solidarity Union
- Liao Kuo-tung (MD'82), member of the Legislative Yuan (2002–2024)
- Chen Yung-hsing (MD'75), member of the Legislative Yuan (1996–1999)
- Shih Chung-liang (MD'91), Minister of Health and Welfare
- Shen Meng-ru (MD'93), president of National Cheng Kung University
- Huang Chao-shun (Pharm'06), member of the Legislative Yuan (1993–2020)

== See also ==
- List of universities in Taiwan
