= Chu An-min =

South Korean-born Taiwanese writer and publisher

Chu An-min (Chinese: 初安民; Pe̍h-ōe-jī: Chho͘ An-bîn; born 1957) is a South Korean-born Taiwanese writer and publisher.

Chu's father was a traditional Chinese medicine practitioner from Yantai who fled the Chinese Civil War. Though he intended to settle in Taiwan, the elder Chu was unable to secure safe passage on a ship across the Taiwan Strait and moved to South Korea instead. Chu An-min was born in South Korea in 1957. As a child, Chu was read classics such as the Analects and Zuo Zhuan in lieu of other forms of entertainment such as playing outside or with toys. The literary foundation his father built for Chu connected him to Chinese culture. Chu An-min moved to Taiwan in 1977, and earned a Bachelor of Arts degree in Chinese literature from National Cheng Kung University in 1982. He taught for one year at Mingdao High School, then resigned to pursue a career in literature. Chu joined the staff of Unitas, a literary magazine published by the United Daily News Group, the parent company of the United Daily News, in an entry-level position, and received successive promotions over the years to become chief editor of the publication. As chief editor of Unitas, Chu received the literature editing award at the 2003 May Fourth Literary Prize ceremony, funded by the Wenhsun literary magazine. After two decades at Unitas, Chu founded the Ink Literary Monthly Publishing Company. While running Ink Publishing, Chu was named the 2021 recipient of the Golden Tripod special contributions award.
