= Chung-Ho Memorial Hospital =

Hospital in Sanmin, Kaohsiung, Taiwan

Chung-Ho Memorial Hospital 高雄醫學大學附設中和紀念醫院
- Kaohsiung Medical University
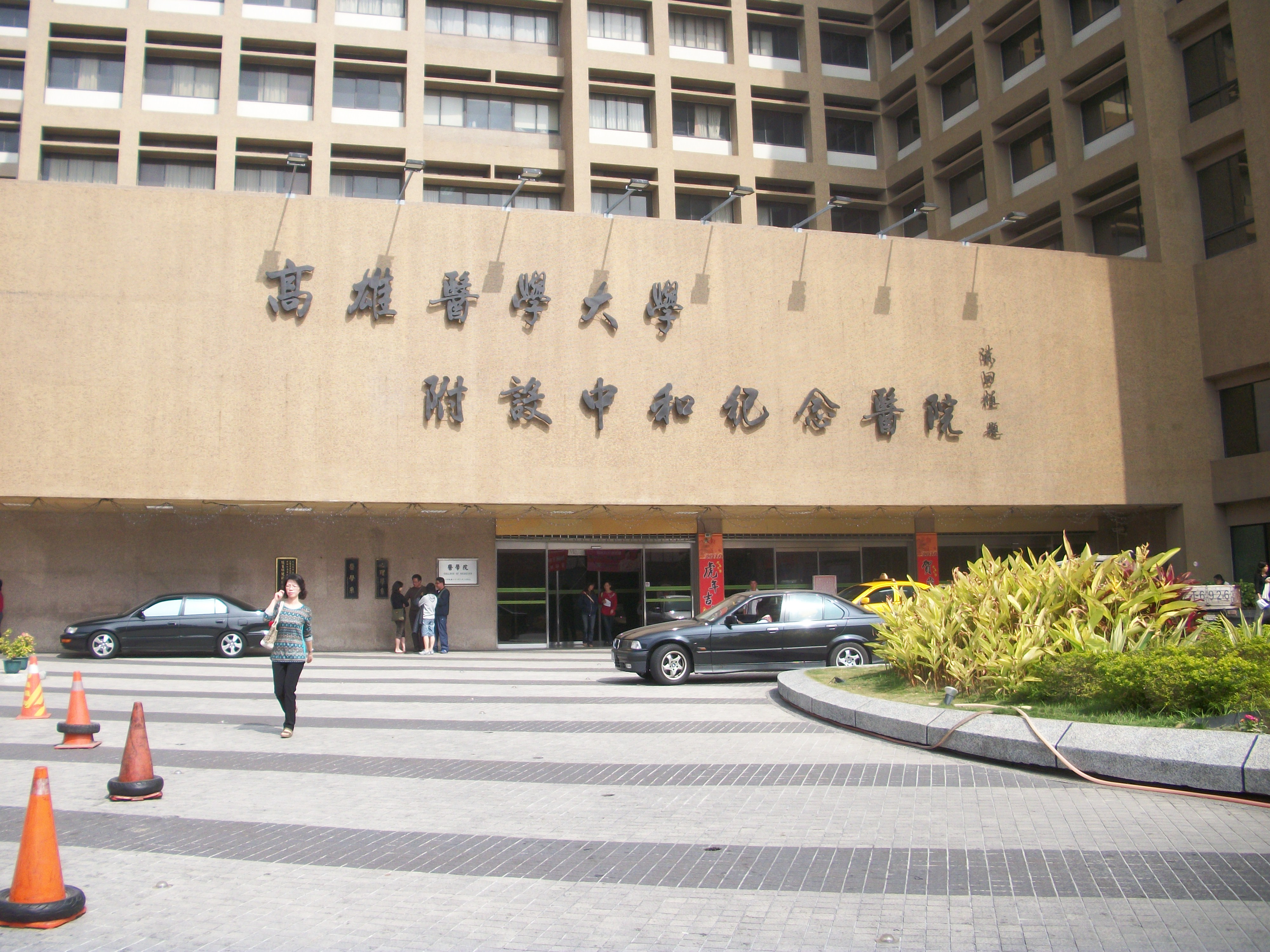

Geography
- Location: Sanmin, Kaohsiung, Taiwan
- Coordinates: 22°38′45.1″N 120°18′33.3″E

Organisation
- Care system: Private
- Type: Teaching hospital
- Affiliated university: Kaohsiung Medical University
- Patron: Chen Chi-chuan

Services
- Emergency department: yes
- Beds: 2002

History
- Opened: 1957

Links
- Website: www.kmuh.org.tw

Kaohsiung Medical University Chung-Ho Memorial Hospital (Chinese: 高雄醫學大學附設中和紀念醫院; pinyin: Gāoxióng Yīxué Dàxué Fùshè Zhōng Hé Jìniàn Yīyuàn), also known as Kaohsiung Medical University Hospital, is a teaching hospital in Sanmin District, Kaohsiung, Taiwan. It was established on 1957 to provide clinical training, health care and medical treatment, and facilitate medical research and development. It is the teaching hospital for Kaohsiung Medical University. It was listed among the "World's Best Hospitals" in 2024 by Newsweek.

Kaohsiung Medical University Chung-Ho Memorial Hospital is located at the corner of Tzyou 1st Road and Zi-You 1st Street and consists of 1626 beds and 12 departments. A pioneer hospital in Southern Taiwan, it offers general medical care as well as a wide range of highly specialized services and innovative care. KMU Chung-Ho Memorial Hospital is a part of the Kaohsiung Medical University Medical Center network of teaching hospitals associated with the Kaohsiung Medical University. KMU Chung-Ho Memorial Hospital was designated by the Taiwan government a High Quality Cancer Therapy Center in 2010.

== See also ==
- List of hospitals in Taiwan
