= Wei-Kan Chu =

American physicist

Wei-Kan Chu (朱唯幹) is an American physicist, an expert in ion beam interaction with solids, currently the Cullen University Professor and distinguished university professor at the University of Houston, and an Elected Fellow of the American Physical Society.

Chu graduated from the National Cheng Kung University (NCKU), Department of Physics in Tainan, Taiwan in 1962, and received his PhD from Baylor University in 1969. He has served on the board of the NCKU North America Alumni Association, and in 1998 he received NCKU's distinguished alumni award.
