= AOC International =

Taiwanese electronics company

- Trade name: AOC
- Founded: 1934; 92 years ago in Chicago, Illinois, U.S. (as Admiral Overseas Corporation)
- Founder: Ross Siragusa
- Headquarters: Taipei, Taiwan
- Area served: Worldwide
- Products: Monitors, TVs, other displays
- Number of employees: 569 (as of 2019)
- Parent: TPV Technology
- Website: www.aoc.com

AOC International (trading as AOC, formerly Admiral Overseas Corporation and stylized as ΛOC; Chinese: 冠捷科技有限公司; pinyin: Guānjié kējì yǒuxiàn gōngsī) is a multinational corporation and electronics company headquartered in Taipei, Taiwan, and a subsidiary of TPV Technology. It designs and produces a full range of LCD TVs and monitors (and formerly CRT monitors), which are sold worldwide under the AOC brand. The typeface used in its logo is a modified Eurostile.

== History ==
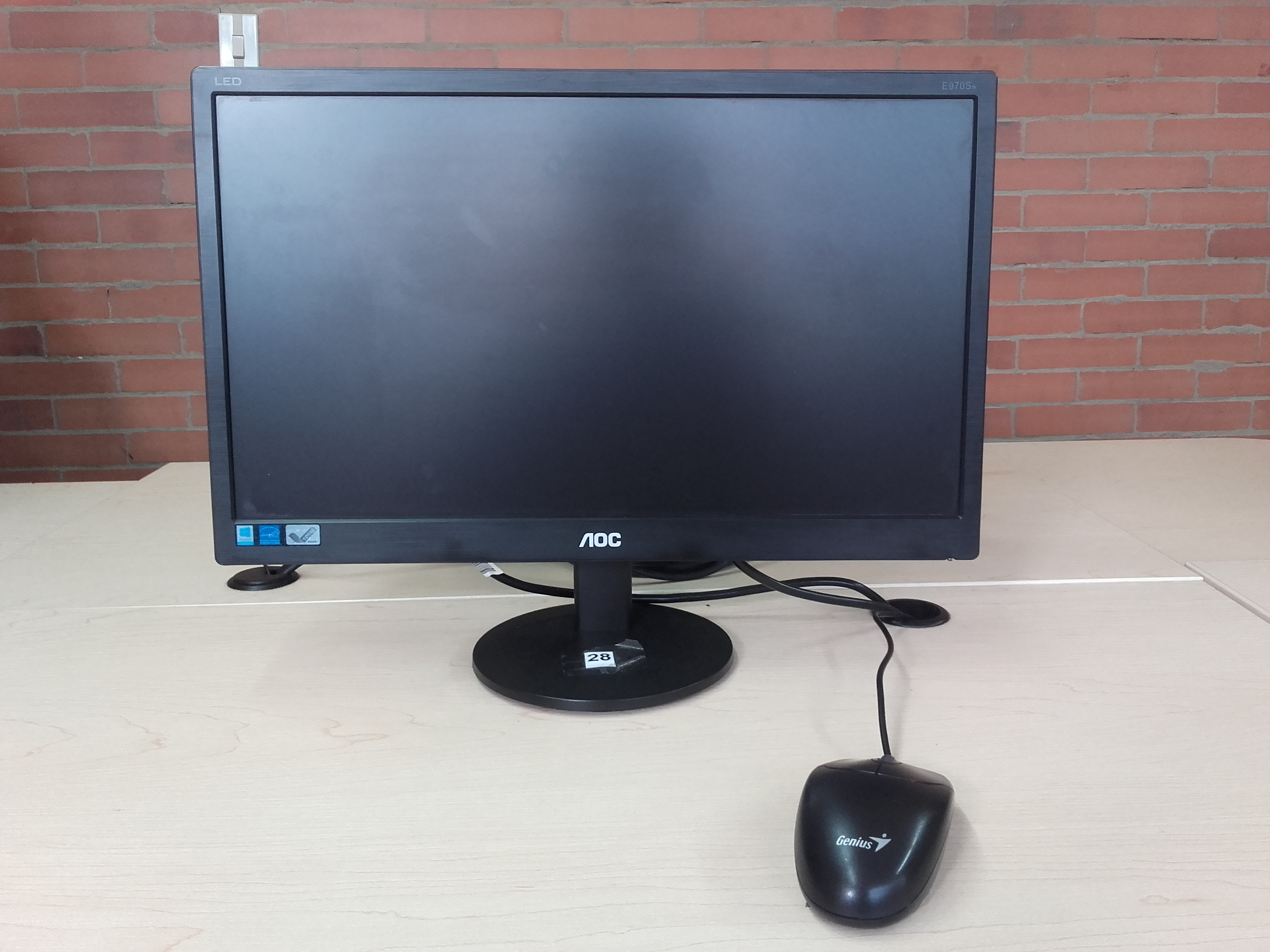
An AOC E970SWNL, an 18.5-inch LED monitor

Admiral Overseas Corporation (AOC) was founded in Chicago, Illinois, by Ross Siragusa as the Asian arm of his Admiral Corporation, and later established in Taiwan in 1967 as the first manufacturer of colour televisions for export. In 1978, Admiral Overseas Corporation was renamed AOC International. Direct marketing under the AOC brand name began in 1979. From 1988 to 1997, AOC established its sales offices in the United States, China, Europe, and Brazil. AOC was launched in India and Mexico in 2005 and 2006, respectively. Today, AOC products, including CRT and LCD monitors, LCD television sets, all-in-one units and Android tablets, are available in more than 40 countries worldwide.

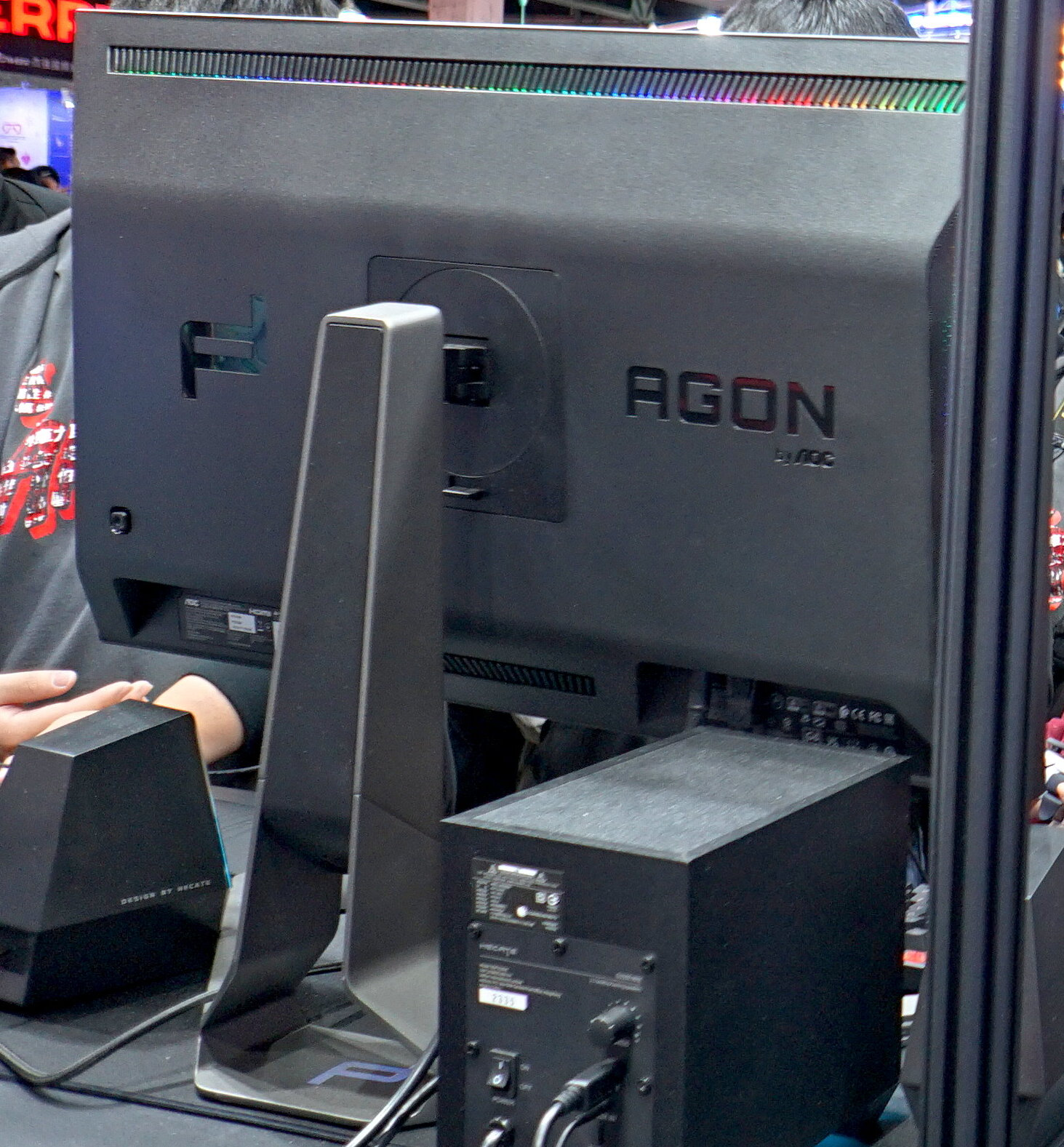
Backside of an AOC AGON PD32M mini LED gaming monitor

In 2022, AOC's AGON line of gaming monitors was the best-selling gaming monitor brand, with a 29% market share.

In 2024, with its Graphic Pro series, AOC presented monitors aimed at professional users in the field of image and video editing for the first time.

== See also ==
- List of companies of Taiwan
