= Chen Tze-chiang =

Taiwanese computer scientist

- 陳自強
- Born: 1951 (age 74–75); Taiwan
- Education: National Cheng Kung University (BS, MS); Yale University (MS, PhD)
- Scientific career
- Fields: Applied physics
- Institutions: Thomas J. Watson Research Center
- Thesis: Bistable Switching in Metal/Thin Oxide/Silicon Devices (1985)
- Doctoral advisor: Richard C. Barker

Chen Tze-chiang (Chinese: 陳自強; pinyin: Chén Zìqiáng; born 1951) is a Taiwanese physicist and electrical engineer. He joined the IBM Thomas J. Watson Research Center in 1984. He is currently an IBM Fellow and the Vice President of Science and Technology at Thomas J. Watson Research Center, IBM Research Division in Yorktown Heights, New York.

== Early life and education ==
Chen was born in Taiwan in 1951 to parents who were both teachers. He graduated from National Cheng Kung University with a Bachelor of Science (B.S.) in physics in 1974 and a Master of Science (M.S.) in physics in 1976. He then completed doctoral studies in the United States, earning a second M.S. in 1979 and his Ph.D. in electrical engineering and applied science in 1985 from Yale University.

== Academic career ==
Chen has published more than 60 papers in technical journals and conferences. His contributions to advanced bipolar technology had a major impact on IBM S/390 mainframe systems. More recently, his contributions to CMOS miniaturization and DRAM devices have had a profound impact on IBM's leadership in CMOS process technology and DRAM manufacturing. Chen was elected as a Fellow of the Institute of Electrical and Electronics Engineers (IEEE) in 1999 for contributions to silicon bipolar and DRAM technology development. Chen has been recognized with several IBM Technical Innovation Awards and was named IBM Distinguished Engineer and IBM Fellow in 1996 and 1999, respectively.

During the period of Feb. 1999 - Feb. 2003, Chen was the Director of Advanced Logic/Memory Technology Development at the Semiconductor Research and Development Center, IBM Microelectronics Division in East Fishkill, New York. During the period of 1992–1999, he was the Senior Manager responsible for the 64Mb/256Mb/1Gb DRAM Technology Development in IBM/Siemens/Toshiba DRAM Development Alliance. Before assuming his role as the Project Manager in DRAM Development, he held a variety of managerial assignments in his career at IBM, including Functional Manager of High-Performance BiCMOS Technology, Manufacturing Engineering Manager in the Bipolar VLSI Line, and Manager of Optical Lithography Development at Watson Research Center.

== Awards and honors ==
In 2011, he received the IEEE Ernst Weber Managerial Leadership Award. In 2022, he was elected to Academia Sinica.

In 2025, Chen was elected to the National Academy of Engineering.
