= Jason Hsuan =

Chairman, executive director and chief executive officer of TPV Technology

- Born: 1943 (age 82–83); Jianyang, Nanping, Fujian, China
- Education: National Cheng Kung University (BS); New York University (PhD); Boston University (MS)
- Occupation: Businessman
- Organization(s): TPV Technology (CEO, Chairman)
- Board member of: TPV Technology

Jason Hsuan (Chinese: 宣建生; born 1943) is the chairman, executive director and chief executive officer of TPV Technology.

== Biography ==
Hsuan earned a B.S. in electrical engineering in 1968 from National Cheng Kung University and a Ph.D. in systems engineering from the New York University Tandon School of Engineering (then Polytechnic Institute of Brooklyn) and a master's degree in systems engineering from Boston University.

In 2012, he was chairman and CEO of TPV Technology Limited.
