= TP Vision =

Dutch electronics company, subsidiary of TPV Technology

- Type: Besloten vennootschap
- Predecessor: Philips Television
- Founded: 2 April 2012
- Headquarters: Amsterdam, Netherlands
- Key people: Kostas Vouzas (CEO)
- Products: Consumer electronics
- Brands: Philips
- Number of employees: 2000 (2014)
- Parent: TPV Technology
- Website: www.tpvision.com

TP Vision Europe B.V. is a Dutch consumer electronics manufacturer and a wholly owned subsidiary of TPV Technology. It develops, manufactures and markets Philips branded products such as television sets, audio products, and commercial displays, in Europe, Latin America, the Middle East and selected countries in Asia-Pacific.

The company began in 2012 after it was divested from Philips and is based in Amsterdam, alongside its sister company MMD, which develops Philips computer monitors and digital signage. Product design for both companies are handled in Amsterdam while an Innovation Center technical lab is maintained in Ghent, Belgium. Philips Professional Display Solutions (PPDS) is the unified B2B trading name for both entities.

== History ==
Philips, founded and then based in Eindhoven, designed and released its first radio receiver in 1927 and was a dominant leader in radio during the 1930s. It also presented its first television set in 1935 although its first released mass-produced model was in 1950.

In 2011, during a time when Philips was significantly downsizing, the company announced its intention to sell a majority stake in its TV business to TPV Technology, which already had the full rights to Philips computer monitors since 2009 under its subsidiary MMD-Monitors & Displays Nederland B.V. The TV business was at that point a sub-division of Philips's Consumer Lifestyle. In April 2012, all 3300 employees of Philips' TV division were transferred to TP Vision, a joint venture 70% owned by TPV Technology, headquartered in Hong Kong, China and 30% by Royal Philips Electronics. Philips also receives royalties from TP Vision.

In January 2014 Philips sold its remaining 30% equity interest in TP Vision.

In 2018, TP Vision also gained the sole license for Philips audio products in the regions it operated in at the time.

== Products ==
=== TVs ===
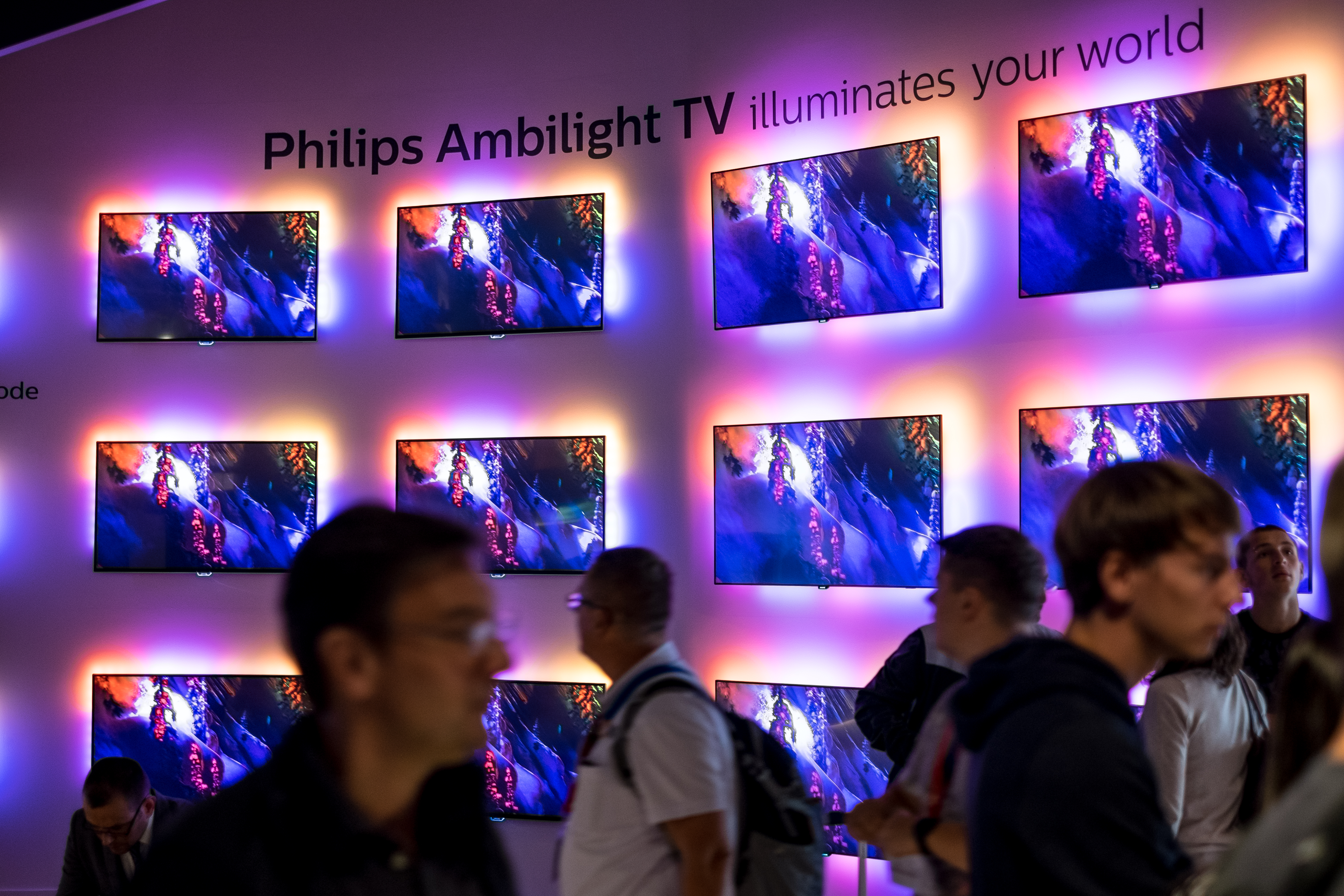
Philips Ambilight televisions on display at IFA Berlin 2015

The company's main consumer offering is the Philips Ambilight televisions which make use of the patented Ambilight bias lighting originally released in 2004. Until 2022, Philips Ambilight TVs supported and communicated with Philips Hue smart lighting (designed by Signify N.V.) which halted from 2023 models onwards after Signify attempted to license it for a fee. In 2026, TP Vision rolled out AmbiScape that uses the Matter open standard for lighting connectivity to various lamps, onto some of its TVs.

In 2018, TP Vision partnered with Bowers & Wilkins to embed the latter's custom audio technologies into the newly launched premium Philips OLED+ series of TVs. These now make up the 900-series of models whereas lower tiered TVs with self-emissive OLED displays are 800- and 700-series and lack the Bowers & Wilkins audio soundbar but retain Ambilight.

Underneath the flagship OLED lines of TVs lie Philips The Xtra and then Philips The One, both being LED-backlit LCD televisions and featuring Ambilight. As of 2026, The Xtra line (model series PML 9000 and MLED 900) features RGB Mini LED technology while The One line (PUS/PQS 9000 and PUS 8000) features QLED technology. The entry-level Philips TVs are the 7000- and 6000- series (PUS) which lack Ambilight and have other downgraded features. For the B2B and hospitality sector, the line of Philips TVs is called MediaSuite and carry the HFL series code.

==== Software ====
Since 2026, Philips TVs across the whole range run the Titan OS smart TV platform. Previously Titan rolled out in 2024 only for certain product ranges and for many years before that it used Google TV on high-end models and an in-house Linux system called Saphi OS on its mid-to-low tier TVs.

==== Market share ====
In 2024, the Philips MediaSuite range of hotel TVs were the number one selling products in its field in Europe.

=== Audio ===
Philips Fidelio is the flagship sub-brand of Philips audio products produced by TP Vision whereas Philips GO is a dedicated sports audio brand. The company develops products such as soundbars, headphones, radios and turntables.

In 2025, a new range called Century consisting of vintage-styled products was launched to celebrate a centenary of Philips audio history (dating back to the first Pentode radio tube patent).

== Privacy ==
=== Netherlands ===
In 2012, Philips and TP Vision made statements about their monitoring the use of Philips branded smart TVs in the Netherlands, such as "60% of our active users switch on their television more than 50 times a month".

The Dutch Data Protection Authority (nl) started an investigation into TP Visions collection and handling of usage data in 2012, and in 2013 reported these are not conforming to law in the Netherlands. Through the use of cookies and logfiles, TP Vision was found to be able to monitor when a Philips smart TV is switched on, which programmes are being watched, which websites are being visited and which apps are being used, without clearly informing their customers and asking their prior permission.

In response, TP Vision stated it would change its practices to conform to the law.

== See also ==
- Funai
