= National Cheng Kung University Hospital =

Hospital in North District, Tainan, Taiwan

National Cheng Kung University Hospital 國立成功大學醫學院附設醫院
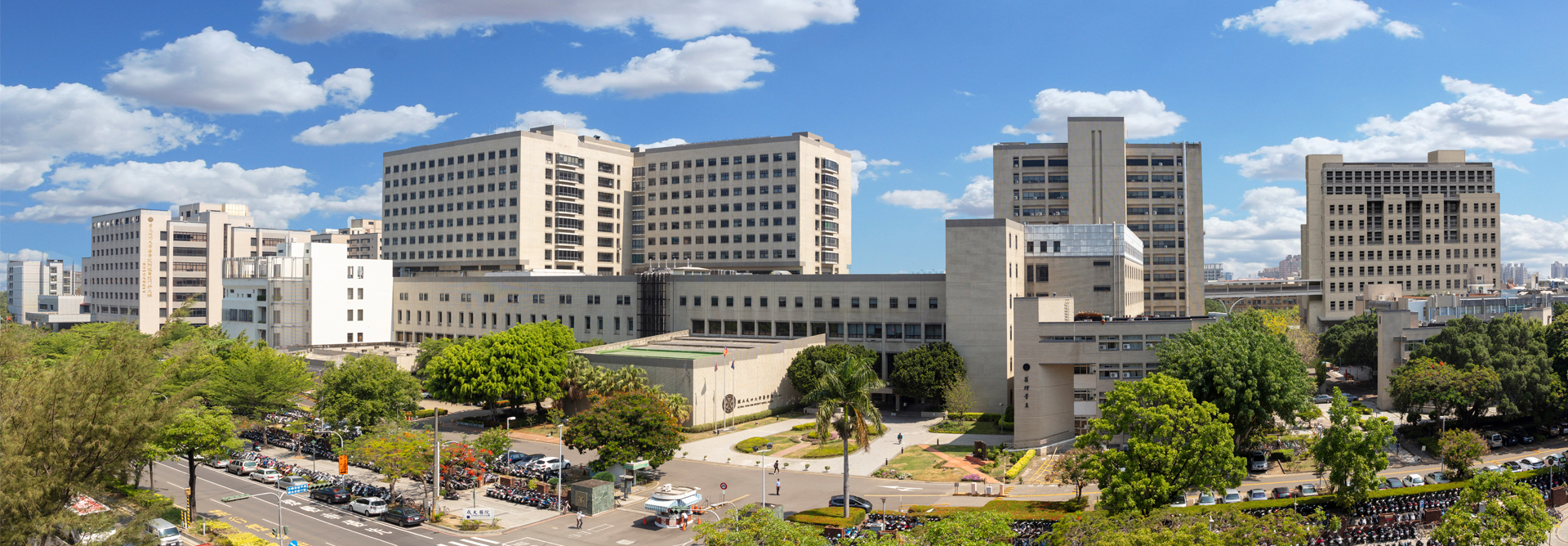

Geography
- Location: North District, Tainan, Taiwan
- Coordinates: 23°00′08.0″N 120°13′10.8″E

Organisation
- Type: hospital
- Affiliated university: National Cheng Kung University

Services
- Beds: 1,342

History
- Founded: 12 June 1988

Links
- Website: Official website

The National Cheng Kung University Hospital (NCKU Hospital; traditional Chinese: 國立成功大學醫學院附設醫院; simplified Chinese: 国立成功大学医学院附设医院; pinyin: Guólì Chénggōng Dàxué Yīxuéyuàn Fùshè Yīyuàn) is a hospital in North District, Tainan, Taiwan.

== History ==
NCKU Hospital was constructed in 1985 and opened to the public on 12 June 1988. In July 1993, it was upgraded to a medical center.

== Architecture ==
The hospital consists of 14 floors with a total floor area of 112,860 m^{2}. It consists of 34 clinical care departments, 18 administrative departments and 3 allied health departments. It has a total number of 1,342 beds.

== Transportation ==
The hospital is accessible within walking distance north east of Tainan Station of Taiwan Railway.

== See also ==
- List of hospitals in Taiwan
- National Cheng Kung University
