= TPV Technology =

Chinese electronics manufacturing company

TPV Technology Limited
- Type: Private
- Traded as: SEHK: 903 (delisted); SGX: TPV (delisted)
- Industry: Electronics
- Founded: 1967 in Taiwan
- Headquarters: 108 Wai Ye Street, Kwun Tong, Hong Kong, China
- Area served: Worldwide
- Key people: Jason Hsuan (Chairman and CEO)
- Products: Computer monitors; LCD TVs
- Revenue: ▼US$9.6 billion (2017)
- Operating income: ▼US$1.8 million (2017)
- Net income: ▼US$-58 million (2017)
- Number of employees: ▼29,014
- Parent: Nanjing CEC Panda Information Industry Group Co., Ltd. (24.51%); Nanjing New Industry Investment Group Co., Ltd. (9.54%); Nanjing Machinery & Electronics Industrial (Group) Co., Ltd. (9.36%)
- Subsidiaries: AOC International; TP Vision
- Website: www.tpv-tech.com

TPV Technology Limited (informally TPV, Chinese: 冠捷科技) is a Fortune China 500 multinational electronics manufacturing company headquartered in Kwun Tong, Hong Kong, and incorporated in Bermuda. It is the world’s largest manufacturer of computer monitors with a 33% market share. TPV designs and produces a full range of CRT and TFT LCD monitors as well as LCD TVs for distribution globally. It owns brands such as AOC, Envision, and Philips for some products (TPV obtained the brand name of Philips from Koninklijke Philips N.V.). It is also an original design manufacturer for other companies.

The company started privatization in late 2019.

== History ==
The company was founded in 1990 in Taiwan as Top Victory Electronics, as the mainland China manufacturing plant of AOC International (founded in 1967).

In September 2005, TPV Technology acquired part of Philips' monitor and entry-level flat screen TV sets manufacturing business, making it the largest display manufacturer in the world, and TPV got the brand license for Philips monitors and Philips entry-level TV sets. In March 2008, TPV acquired a business operation from Chi Mei Optoelectronics Corporation.

In June 2009 MMD (Multimedia Displays) as a wholly owned company of TPV was established through a brand license agreement with Philips, and its role is to exclusively market and sell Philips branded LCD monitors and displays worldwide. Three categories of Philips product lines are included under the agreement: the Business and Consumer Range of LCD monitors, Public Signage and Hotel/Hospitality TV.

In April 2011, TPV Technology and Philips agreed to form a Netherlands-based television manufacturing joint venture comprising all of Philips' television operations, and owned 70% by TPV Technology and 30% by Philips. Creation of the joint venture, named TP Vision, was completed in April 2012. In January 2014, TPV Technology announced an agreement with Philips to transfer the remaining 30% shares to TPV, which was completed in May 2014, making TP Vision a wholly owned subsidiary of TPV Technology.

== Operations ==
TPV Technology manufactures CRT monitors, LCD monitors and LCD TVs. As of 2010, TPV had a total production capacity of 6.1 million monitors per month. TPV has five factories in China, two in Brazil, one in Poland and one in Russia, and sells its products worldwide.
