= National Cheng Kung University =

Public research university in Tainan, Taiwan

Coordinates: 23°00′N 120°13′E

- 國立成功大學
- Former names: Tainan Technical College (1931–46); Taiwan Provincial College of Engineering (1946–56); Taiwan Provincial Cheng Kung University (1956–71)
- Motto: 窮理致知
- Motto in English: Knowledge through reason
- Type: National public research university
- Established: 1931; 95 years ago
- Affiliations: T4; NSTC; WUN; AACSB; IEET; UAiTED
- Endowment: NT$20 billion (2022) (US$665 million)
- President: Shen Meng-ru
- Faculty: 2,604 (2025)
- Undergraduates: 11,853 (2025)
- Postgraduates: 8,701 (2025)
- Doctoral students: 1,850 (2025)
- Location: Tainan, Taiwan
- Campus: 461.9 acres (186.9 ha); Urban
- Colors: Red Grey White
- Website: web.ncku.edu.tw

Chinese name
- Traditional Chinese: 國立成功大學
- Simplified Chinese: 国立成功大学
Transcriptions
Standard Mandarin
- Hanyu Pinyin: Guólì Chénggōng Dàxué
- Bopomofo: ㄍㄨㄛˊ ㄌㄧˋ ㄔㄥˊ ㄍㄨㄥ ㄉㄚˋ ㄒㄩㄝˊ
- Wade–Giles: Kuo^{2}-li^{4} Ch'eng^{2}-kung^{1} Ta^{4}-hsüeh^{2}
- Tongyong Pinyin: Guólì Chénggōng Dàsyué
Southern Min
- Hokkien POJ: Kok-li̍p Sêng-kong-tāi-ha̍k

National Cheng Kung University (NCKU; Chinese: 國立成功大學; pinyin: Guólì Chénggōng Dàxué) is a national research university in Tainan, Taiwan. Founded in 1931 during Japanese rule as a technical and engineering college, it primarily teaches and conducts research in science, technology, engineering, and mathematics.

Cheng Kung is organized into nine colleges which host undergraduate and graduate programs in 70 departments and 29 research institutes. In addition to its main campus in East District, Tainan, the university also operates National Cheng Kung University Hospital in North District, Tainan, and a satellite campus in Douliu. Most of its more than 11,000 undergraduates and 10,000 graduate students are enrolled in engineering, science, medicine, and design programs.

The university is a founding member of the Taiwan Comprehensive University System and the only Taiwanese member of the Worldwide Universities Network. Notable graduates include the current president of the Republic of China; a Nobel Prize laureate; a premier of the Republic of China; a president of the Control Yuan; presidents of Apple Daily, China Motor Corporation, and TSMC; and members of Academia Sinica.

== History ==
=== Japanese colonial period, 1931–1945 ===
National Cheng Kung University was established in January 1931 as the Tainan Technical College (臺南高等工業學校; pinyin: Táinán Gāoděng Gōngyè Xuéxiào) under the Government-General of Taiwan during Japanese rule. Its founding accompanied increasing industrialization after World War I, which created demand for technically-trained personnel for colonial industrial development and Japan's economic expansion toward Southeast Asia. The decision followed nearly a decade of debate over higher vocational education in southern Taiwan, culminating in the replacement of the existing Tainan Higher Commercial School with an engineering school.

The college initially offered instruction in mechanical engineering, electrical engineering, and applied chemistry, and became the principal institution for advanced industrial education in colonial Taiwan. The student body prioritized Japanese enrollment, with only a minority of enrolled Taiwanese students. The institution expanded during the wartime industrialization of the 1930s and 1940s, adding programs in electrochemistry, civil engineering, and architecture before the end of Japanese rule in 1945.

=== Postwar era, 1945–1971 ===
After World War II and the Retrocession of Taiwan, the school came under the administration of the Kuomintang government and was reorganized in 1946 as the Taiwan Provincial College of Engineering, with six engineering departments. Beginning in 1952, the college received American technical assistance through the Purdue–Formosa Project, a partnership with Purdue University funded as part of a U.S. aid program to Taiwan. Purdue faculty, including engineers Lillian Moller Gilbreth and R. Norris Shreve, participated in the project.

During the Taiwan Miracle, the college expanded beyond its original engineering curriculum, adding programs in management, transportation, and the sciences during the 1950s. In 1956, it became Taiwan Provincial Cheng Kung University, with new colleges of Liberal Arts and Science and Business alongside the existing College of Engineering. Graduate education developed concurrently, beginning with a master's program in mechanical engineering in 1957 and the university's first doctoral program, in electrical engineering, in 1967. The College of Liberal Arts and Science was divided into separate colleges in 1969.

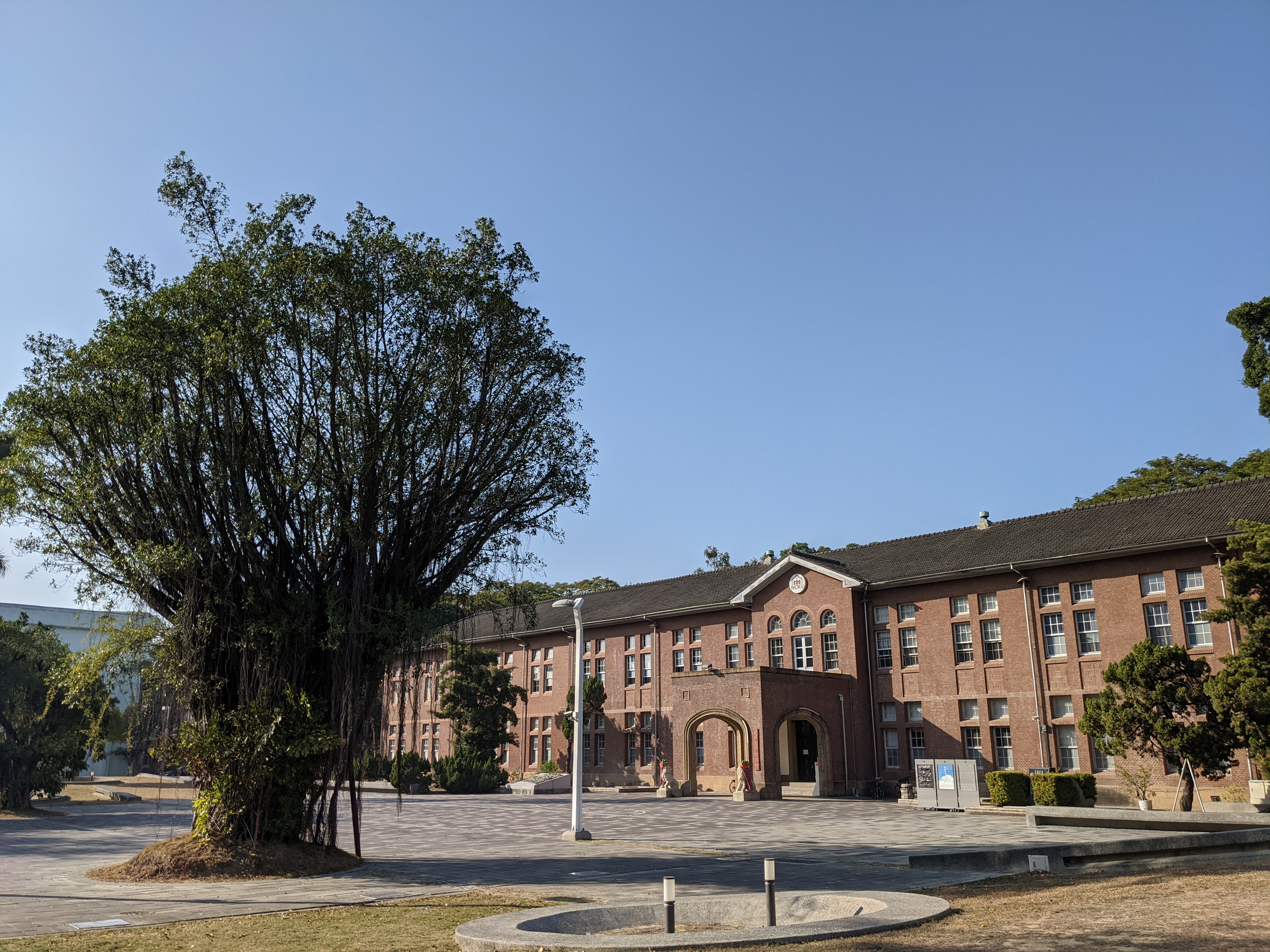
The former administration building of Tainan Technical College, now the National Cheng Kung University Museum

=== National university, 1971–present ===
The institution was reorganized under its present name, National Cheng Kung University, in 1971. Engineering and applied science remained the primary academic focus of the university in following decades. The College of Medicine was established in 1983 and National Cheng Kung University Hospital completed construction in 1988.

The College of Social Sciences was founded in 1997, followed by the colleges of Electrical Engineering and Computer Science and Planning and Design in 2003, and the College of Bioscience and Biotechnology in 2005. In 2020, the university opened the Miin Wu School of Computing, focusing on computing and artificial intelligence.

== Campuses ==
Map of National Cheng Kung University's main campus Academic instruction Administration and services Arts and heritage Housing and lodging Open spaces Sports and recreation NCKU boundary

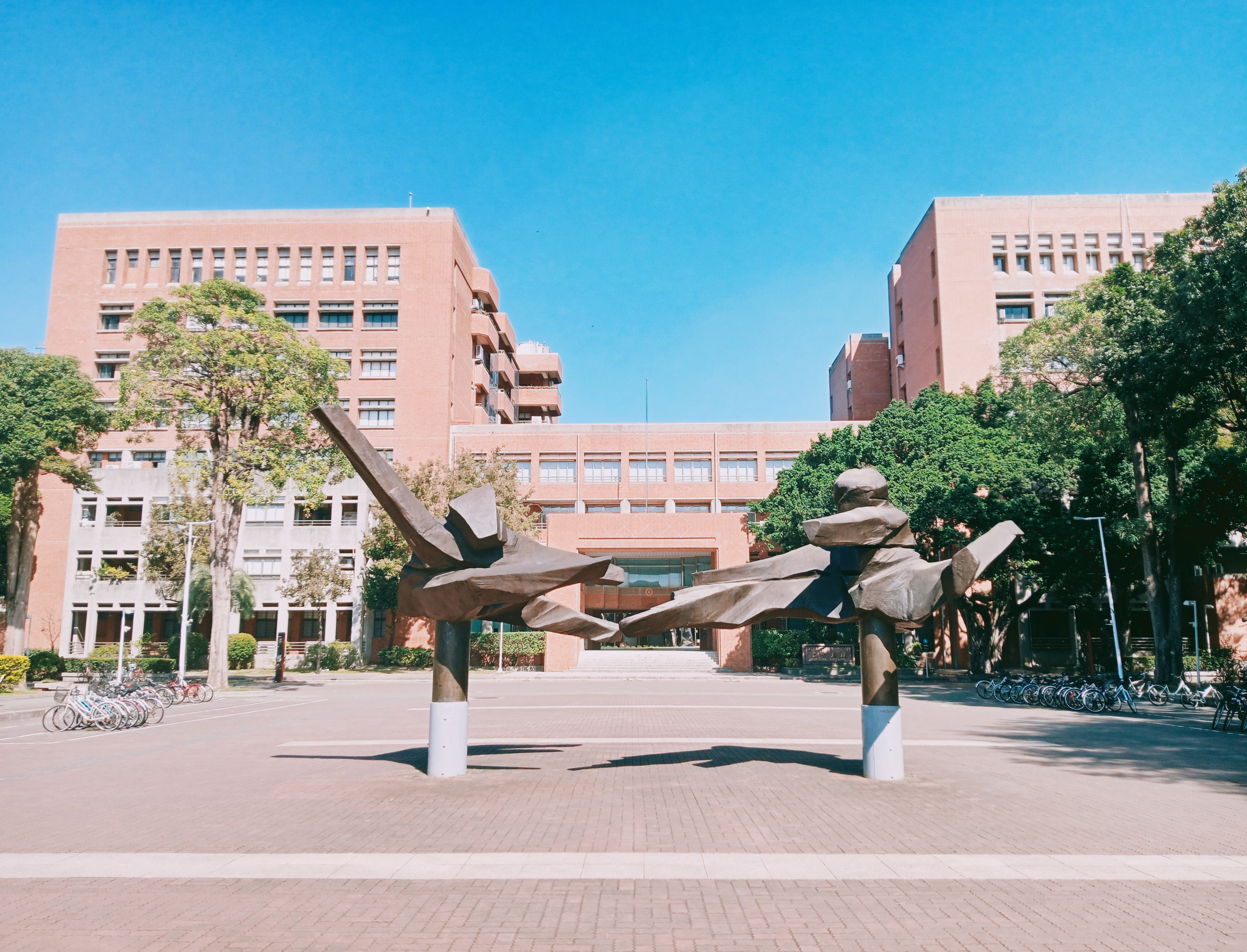
Yun-Ping Administration Building, located on the university's Kuang-fu Campus

NCKU's main campus occupies approximately 83 ha (210 acres) in the East District of Tainan, immediately east of Tainan railway station. It consists of eight contiguous precincts—Cheng-Kung, Sheng-Li, Kuang-Fu, Cheng-Hsing, Tzu-Chiang, Ching-Yeh, Li-Hsing, and Tung-Ning—linked by the streets and pedestrian routes surrounding University Road.

The campus developed outward from the 18.3 ha (45 acres) Cheng-Kung Campus, the site selected for the university's predecessor, Tainan Technical College, in the early 1930s. The original campus was planned between 1929 and 1934 and, among comparable higher technical schools in the Japanese Empire, was notable for its large site, athletic space, and departmental buildings arranged around paired courtyards. Four school buildings from the original complex survive and have been designated municipal monuments by the Tainan city government.

As the university expanded after World War II, it acquired neighboring government and military properties rather than developing a single new campus, incorporating surviving structures from several periods into the university grounds. Its present architectural landscape consequently includes remnants of the Qing-era city walls, Japanese colonial school buildings and military barracks, postwar modernist buildings constructed during the period of American technical assistance, and more recent university facilities.

NCKU has also incorporated environmental design into recent campus development, with university policy requiring major new buildings and renovations to obtain at least a silver rating under Taiwan's Green Building Label system. Its long-term sustainability plan calls for the campus to achieve carbon neutrality by 2041.

=== Cheng-Kung Campus ===
The Cheng-Kung Campus is NCKU's oldest precinct and remains primarily occupied by science and engineering departments, along with the university's main library and several administrative and research facilities. Its present layout preserves the site of the Tainan Technical College, whose original buildings were erected during the first phase of campus construction between 1930 and 1934. The college's former administration building, completed in 1933, now houses the National Cheng Kung University Museum and is a municipal monument. The former physics building and Ger-Chih Hall are also protected historic structures from the original technical-school complex.

=== Kuang-Fu Campus ===
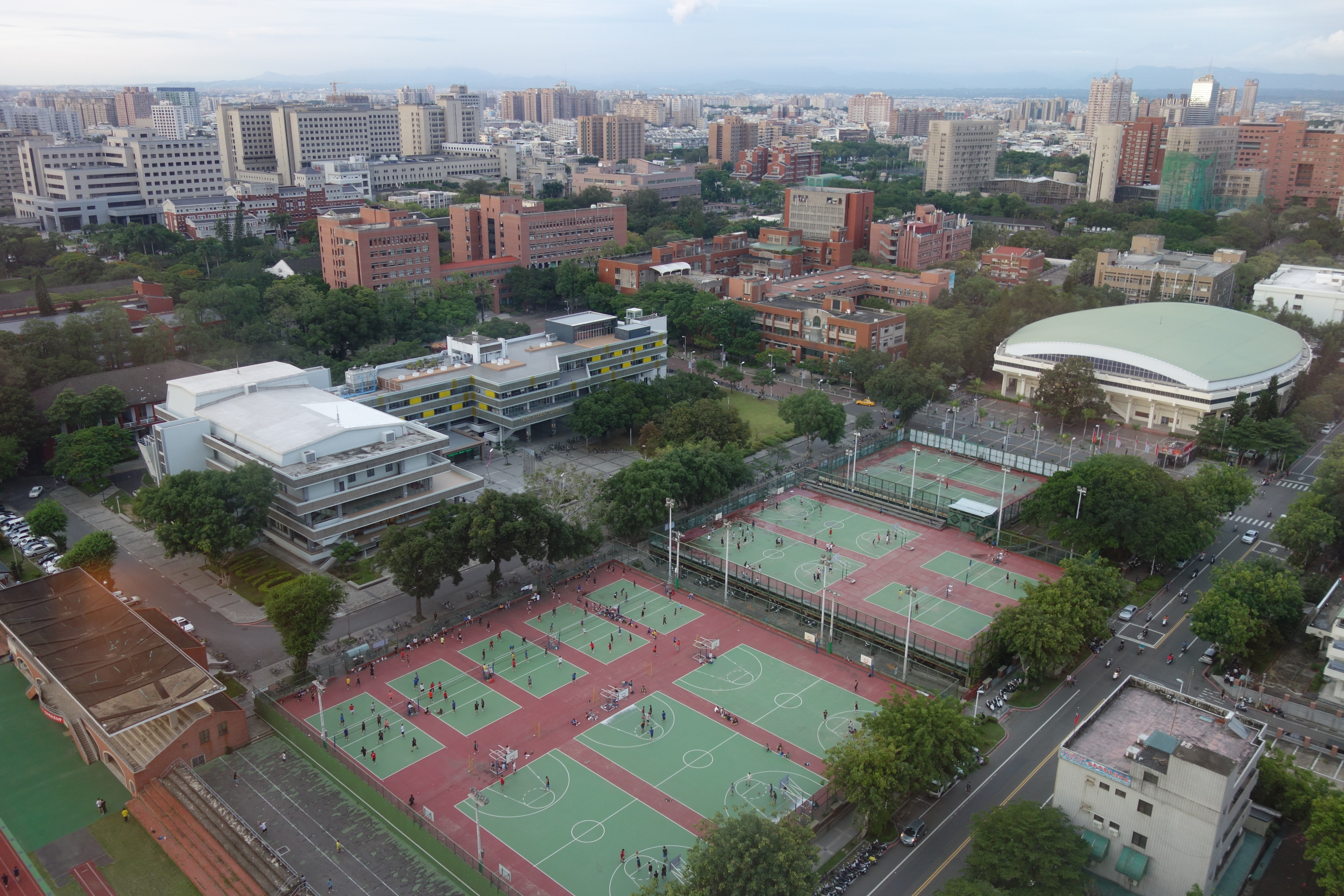
The Kuang-Fu Campus, viewed from the west

The 20.5 ha (51 acres) Kuang-Fu Campus lies west of Cheng-Kung and was acquired from the Ministry of National Defense in 1966. It contains the central university administration, the College of Liberal Arts, several planning and design departments, student facilities, athletic fields, and a group of historic Japanese military buildings. Much of the site had previously served as the barracks of the Japanese Army's Second Taiwan Infantry Regiment, and three surviving buildings from the complex are now designated together as a national monument. Constructed in 1912, the surviving barracks incorporate arcaded verandas and red-brick walls and are now used by academic units including the Department of History and Graduate Institute of Art Studies.

Near the former barracks is Banyan Garden, one of the university's best-known open spaces. Its largest banyan was planted in 1923 by Japanese crown prince Hirohito, later Emperor Shōwa, during his visit to Taiwan and has since become a widely recognized symbol of NCKU. To its east is Cheng-Kung Lake, which was created during construction of the university's athletic field in 1970 and is bordered by royal poinciana trees.

=== Other main-campus precincts ===
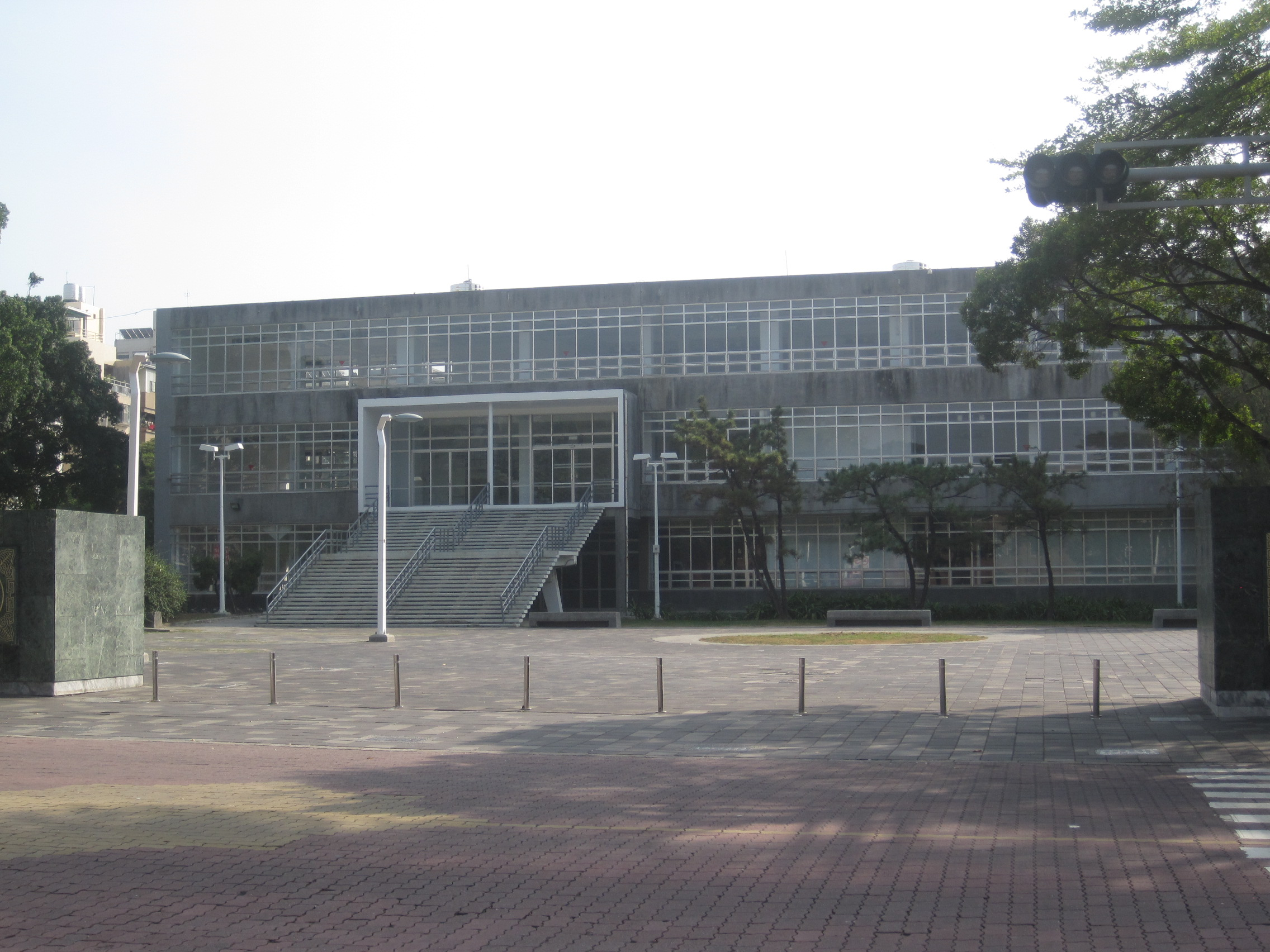
The former main library on Sheng-Li Campus, an example of postwar modernist architecture

Sheng-Li Campus, across University Road from Cheng-Kung, was acquired in 1950 and is used primarily for student housing, recreation, and student services. Its former main library, completed in 1959, is one of the campus's most prominent buildings from the postwar American-aid period and was designed according to modernist principles emphasizing simple geometric forms and functional planning. After library operations moved to the present main library in 2001, the old building was used for student study and other purposes; its front wing was designated a historic building in 2016 and subsequently renovated as the NCKU Future Venue.

North of the central campuses, the 7.3 ha (18 acres) Cheng-Hsing Campus occupies a former army artillery training site acquired in 1971 and contains the College of Medicine and National Cheng Kung University Hospital, as well as programs in nursing, rehabilitation, and biomedical engineering. The 13.3 ha (33 acres) Tzu-Chiang Campus, acquired from the military in 1983, contains several of NCKU's major engineering departments and outdoor athletic facilities. Ching-Yeh and Tung-Ning are used principally for student and faculty housing, recreation, and related services.

Li-Hsing Campus developed from three adjoining government and military properties acquired between 1988 and 2002 and contains medical facilities, the College of Social Sciences, and several research centers. It is also the site of the Y. S. Sun Green Building Research Center, commonly known as the Magic School of Green Technology, which began operating in 2011. Designed as a demonstration project for low-energy construction, it was Taiwan's first zero-carbon, energy-saving building and uses natural ventilation, water conservation, and other passive-design strategies to reduce resource consumption.

=== Other campuses ===
NCKU maintains several specialized campuses away from its central Tainan grounds. The 26 ha (64 acres) Kuei-Jen Campus in Guiren District was initially developed for aeronautics and astronautics research and now accommodates facilities for aerospace engineering, earthquake engineering, and building and fire-safety research. Its research facilities include the Aerospace Science and Technology Research Center and laboratories associated with the National Center for Research on Earthquake Engineering and the Ministry of the Interior's Architecture and Building Research Institute.

The An-Nan Campus occupies approximately 72 ha (180 acres) of former Taiwan Salt Works land in Annan District and is primarily devoted to industry–university cooperation, environmental research, hydraulics, and experimental facilities. Among its facilities are a hydraulic model experimental field, environmental-resources laboratories, aquaculture research facilities, and laboratories for water-quality research.

The Dou-Liu Campus in Douliu, Yunlin County, was transferred to NCKU in 2005 from a former military hospital and operates principally as the Douliu Branch of National Cheng Kung University Hospital. University plans also include a 13 ha (32 acres) Shalun Campus within the Shalun Smart Green Energy Science City, planned around health care, medical innovation, and digital technology. The Executive Yuan approved the first phase of the associated NCKU Shalun Medical Service and Innovation Park in 2021 as a center for smart health care and digital-governance research.

== Academics ==
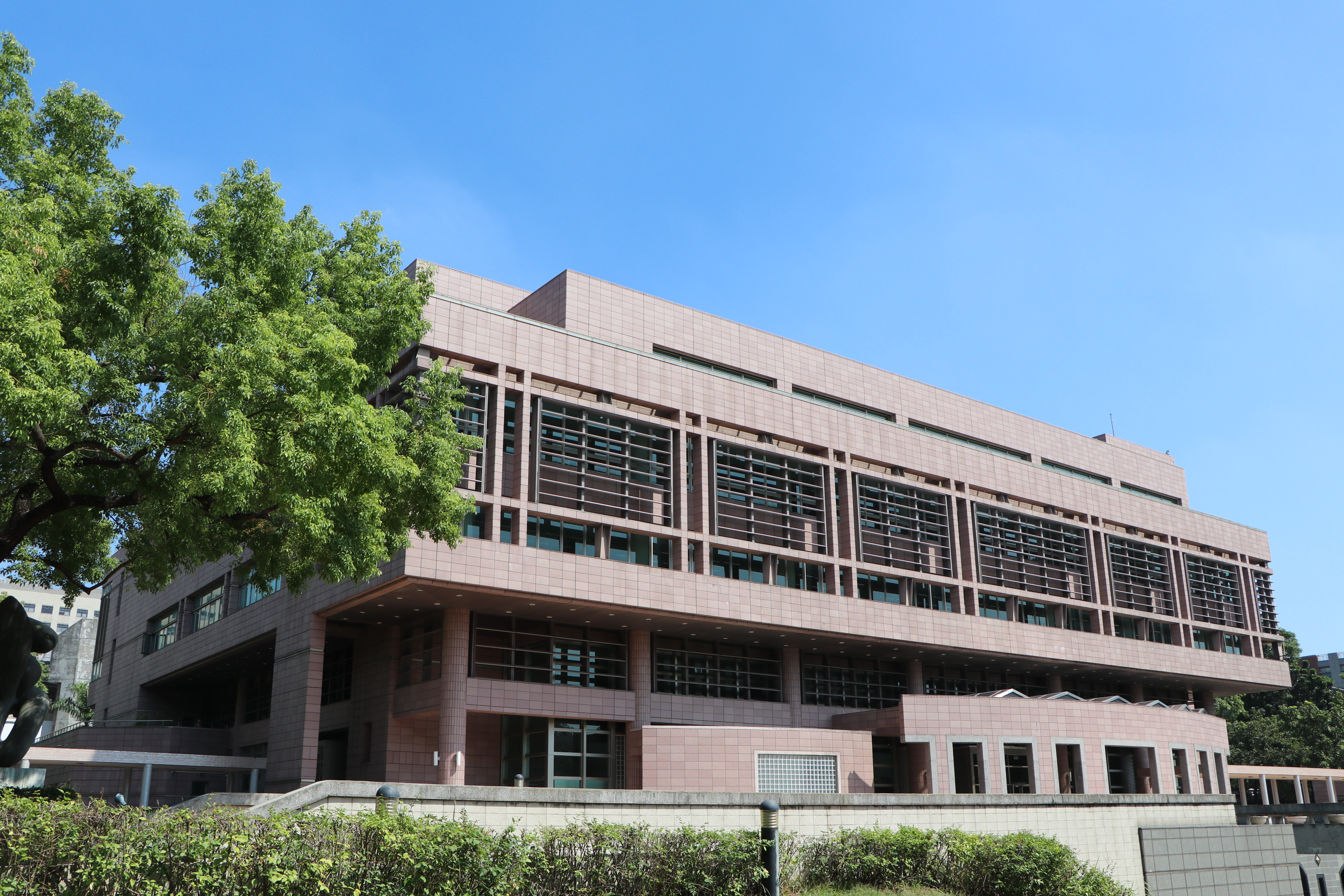
The main library building

The university is organized into eleven academic colleges: the colleges of Liberal Arts, Science, Management, Engineering, Electrical Engineering and Computer Science, Social Science, Planning and Design, Bioscience and Biotechnology, and Medicine, as well as the Miin Wu School of Computing and the Academy of Innovative Semiconductor and Sustainable Manufacturing. As of March 2025, NCKU reported 45 departments and 39 institutes, offering 47 bachelor's programs, 120 master's programs—including 27 in-service master's programs—and 67 doctoral programs.

NCKU operates on a semester system, with the academic year divided into fall and spring semesters. Instruction is conducted primarily in Mandarin Chinese, although the university offers courses and degree programs taught in English; students may generally enroll in courses outside their own department, year, or degree level when individual courses do not impose restrictions.

NCKU has been a member of the Taiwan Comprehensive University System (TCUS) since its establishment in 2011, alongside National Sun Yat-sen University, National Chung Hsing University, and National Chung Cheng University, allowing shared educational and research opportunities. The university has also been a member of the Worldwide Universities Network, an international consortium of research universities, since 2016.

=== Undergraduate education ===
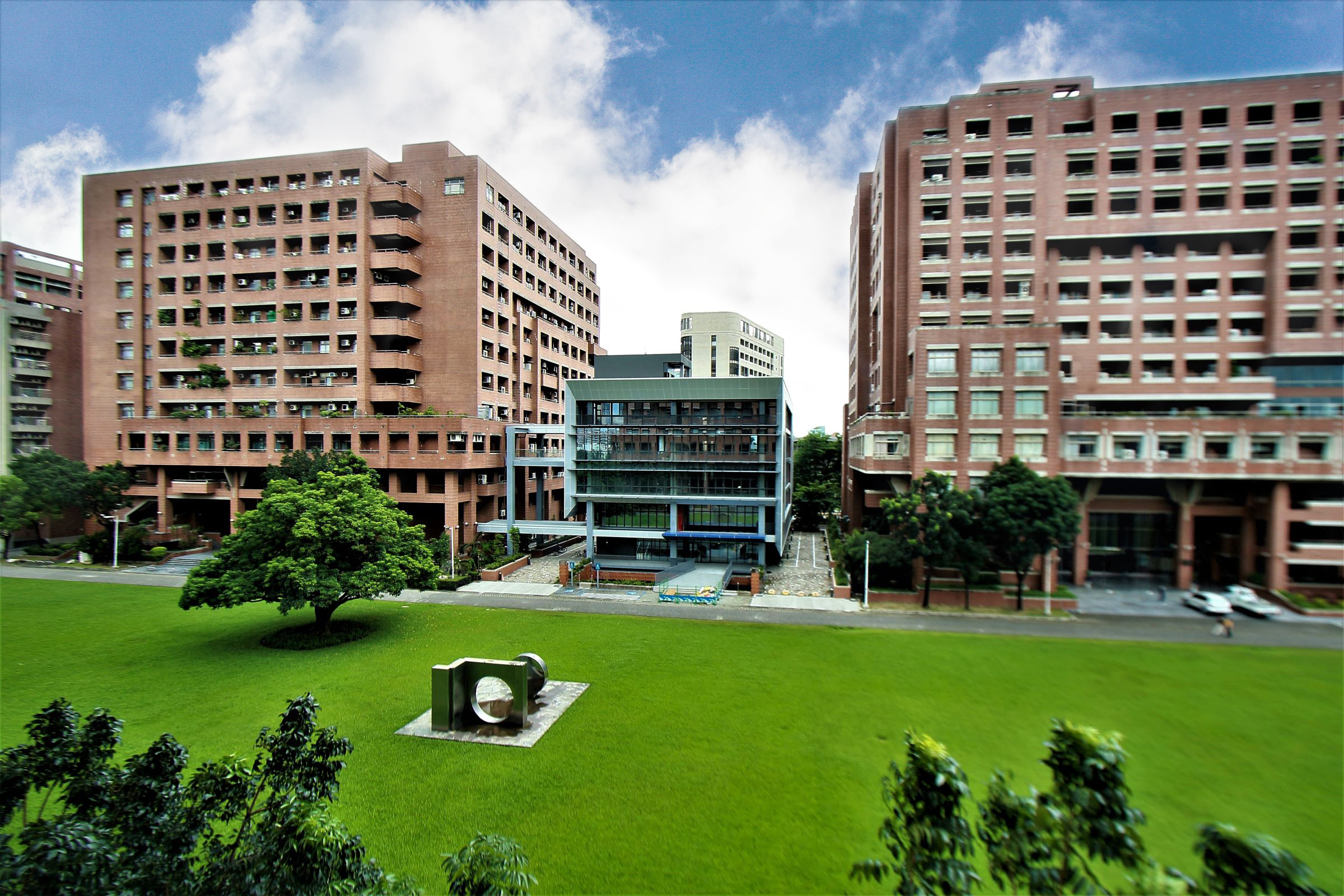
College of Engineering

NCKU requires a minimum of 128 credits for the award of a bachelor's degree. Undergraduate curricula include at least 28 credits of university-designated general education coursework and four semesters of required, non-credit-bearing physical education, while most programs also require at least 28 elective credits. General education is administered by the Center for General Education, established in 1996, which coordinates courses in the humanities, social sciences, natural and engineering sciences, life sciences and health, and interdisciplinary studies.

Since 2017, first-year students have been required to complete Exploring Tainan, a cross-disciplinary general education course that incorporates field study in communities throughout Tainan. The program uses local communities as classrooms and, by 2025, had involved more than 24,000 students, 97 communities, and 125 community mentors across all 33 administrative districts of Tainan.

The university also operates the Cross College Elite Program, through which students may initially enroll without a departmental major while exploring interdisciplinary coursework before applying to a major or developing an individualized course plan. The program emphasizes interdisciplinary and problem-based learning through seminars and courses drawn from multiple faculties, and since the 2017 academic year has also admitted students already enrolled in other NCKU departments.

=== Graduate education ===
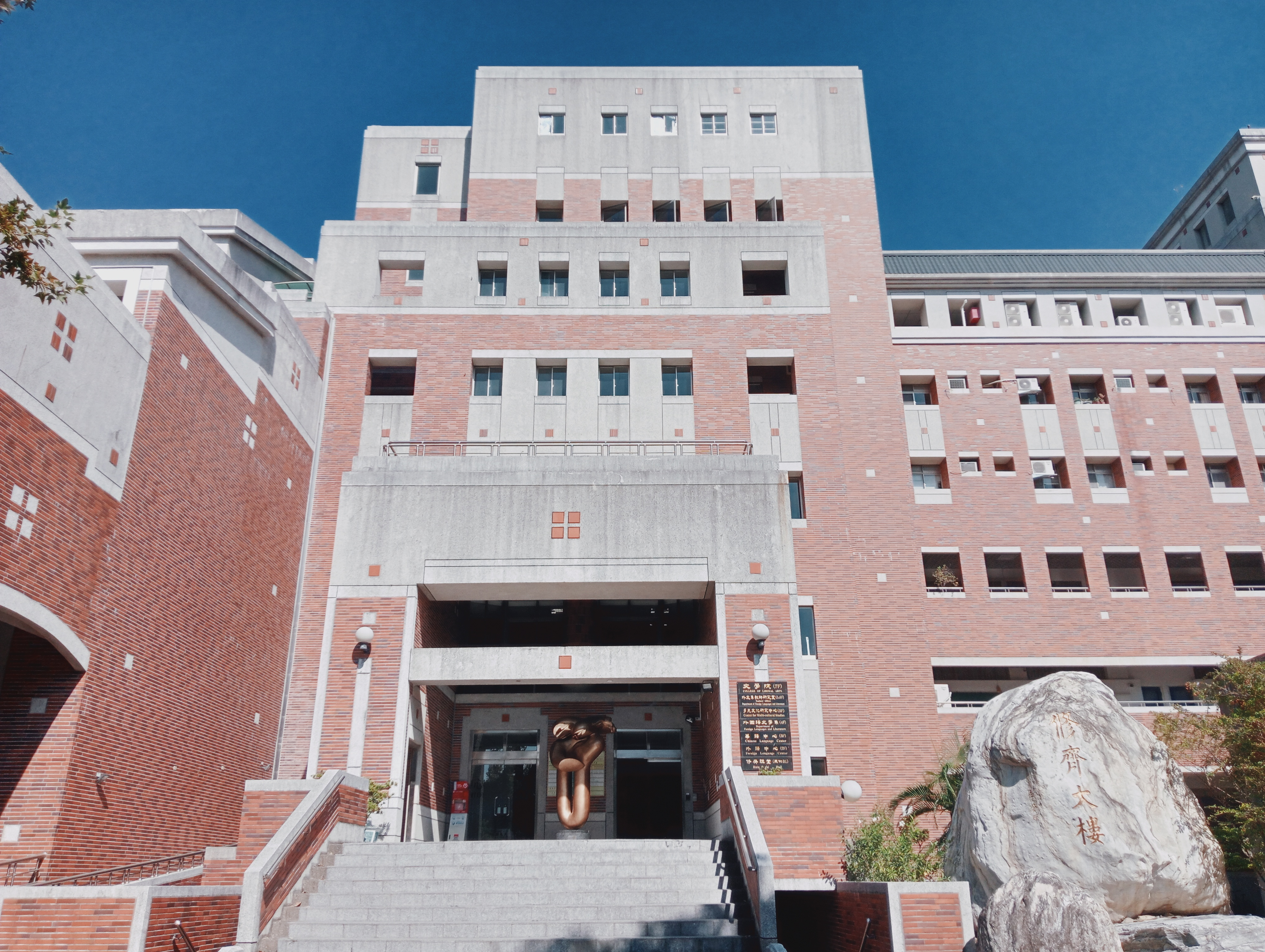
College of Liberal Arts

Graduate study is conducted through departments, institutes, and degree programs located throughout NCKU's colleges and specialized academic units. Under university-wide curriculum regulations, master's degrees ordinarily require at least 24 credits of coursework in addition to six credits assigned to the master's thesis, while doctoral degrees require at least 18 coursework credits in addition to 12 dissertation credits.

Several academic units are predominantly or exclusively devoted to graduate education. The Miin Wu School of Computing, established in 2020, offers graduate programs in intelligent technology systems and intelligent computing as well as an industrial doctorate in intelligent computing. The Academy of Innovative Semiconductor and Sustainable Manufacturing, established in 2021, offers programs in integrated-circuit design, semiconductor manufacturing technology, semiconductor packaging and testing, key materials, and smart and sustainable manufacturing, as well as the Taiwan Semiconductor Master of Management program. Interdisciplinary graduate programs outside the colleges include the International Master's Program in Interdisciplinary Sustainability Studies.

==== Research ====
NCKU organizes research through university-level centers, joint industry research centers, nationally supported research facilities, and shared core facilities. Its joint industry facilities include the TSMC–NCKU Joint Research Center, NCKU–Delta Advanced Technology Research Center, NCKU–Yageo Research Center, and NCKU–SinoPac Future Atelier. National research facilities associated with the university include branches or facilities of the National Applied Research Laboratories, including the Taiwan Semiconductor Research Institute and National Center for Research on Earthquake Engineering, while university core facilities include the Instrument Development Center, Laboratory Animal Center, and Tainan Hydraulics Laboratory.

Research and clinical education in the health sciences are closely associated with National Cheng Kung University Hospital. The College of Medicine, which admitted its first medical students in 1983, consists of seven bachelor's programs, 17 master's programs, and seven doctoral programs, while the affiliated hospital provides clinical training and internships in addition to supporting medical research.

=== Professional and specialized education ===
Professional education at NCKU is largely incorporated within its colleges rather than organized into a separate group of professional schools. The College of Medicine contains the School of Medicine, School of Dentistry, School of Pharmacy, and programs in nursing, physical therapy, occupational therapy, public health, and other biomedical and health disciplines. The college and its affiliated hospital were approved by the Executive Yuan in 1981 as part of Taiwan's major national construction program, and the college began admitting medical students in 1983.

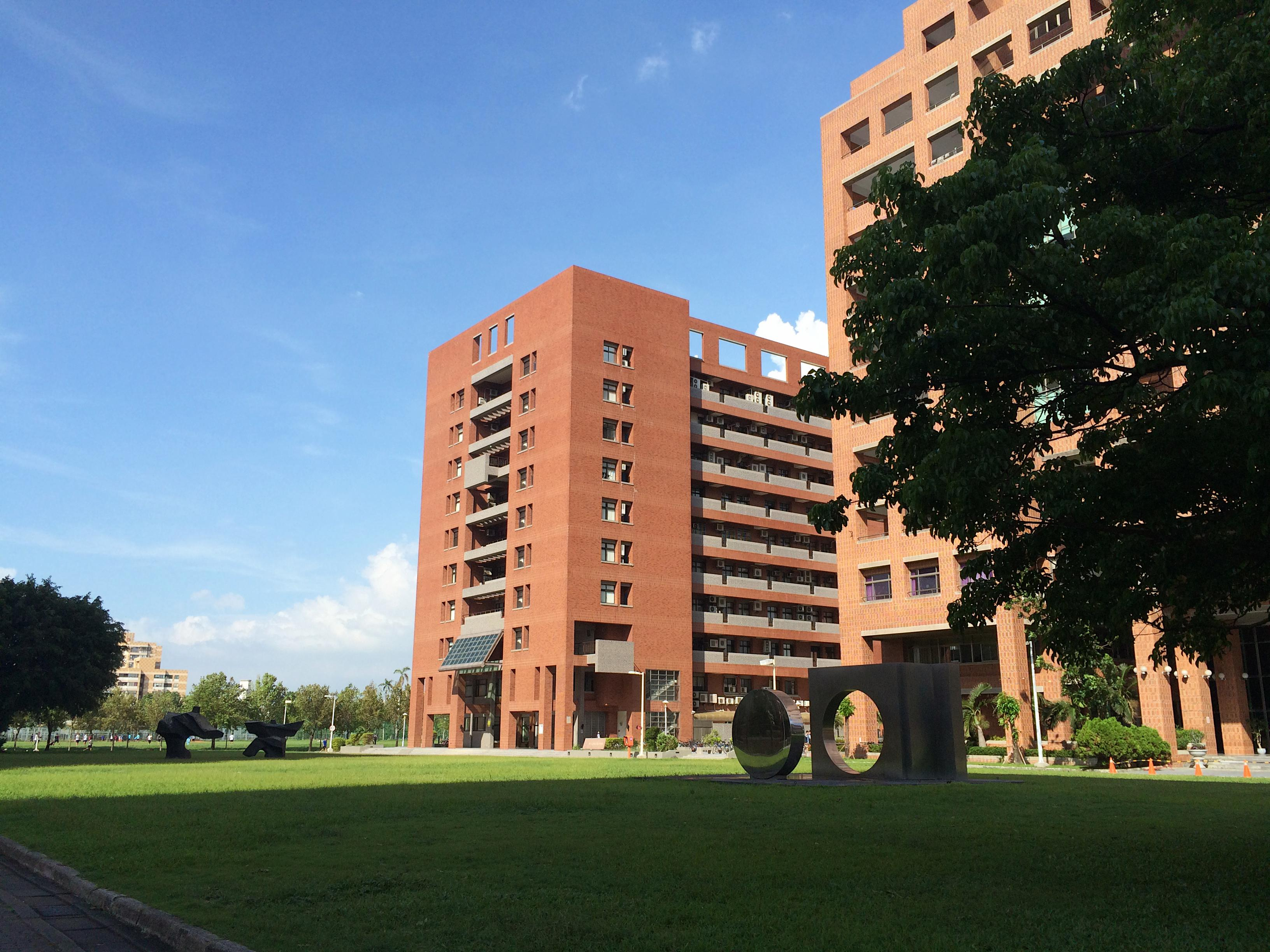
The Zhaokun Precision Instrument Building (照坤精密儀器大樓) on the Tzu-Chiang Campus (自強校區)

The College of Management provides undergraduate, master's, executive, and doctoral education in fields including accounting, finance, statistics and data science, industrial and information management, transportation and communication management, business administration, and international business. The college is accredited in business by AACSB International.

NCKU's engineering programs are divided between the College of Engineering and College of Electrical Engineering and Computer Science. The former encompasses disciplines including mechanical, chemical, civil, materials, environmental, aerospace, biomedical, hydraulic and ocean, and naval engineering, while the latter includes electrical engineering, computer science and information engineering, microelectronics, communications engineering, manufacturing information and systems, and medical informatics. Semiconductor-related graduate education is also concentrated in the Academy of Innovative Semiconductor and Sustainable Manufacturing and the Miin Wu School of Computing.

In 2018, KU Leuven and IMEC founded a dual-degree program with NCKU. That same year, NCKU and Purdue University signed an agreement of collaboration for an international dual-degree program and accompanying online courses. TU Darmstadt launched its liaison office in Asia at NCKU on 21 May 2019.

=== Library system ===
The university library system includes the Main Library and a separate Medical Library. As of June 2026, its collections comprised approximately 1.46 million books, 443,623 bound journal volumes, and 514,858 audiovisual and other non-book items, for a physical collection totaling approximately 2.41 million items. The library system also provided access to approximately 1.13 million electronic books, 116,291 electronic journals, and 554 electronic databases.

== Student life ==
Auditorium and student center

=== Student organizations ===
The university reported 179 student clubs in 2025. The university's Student Development and Activities Division classifies these organizations into six categories: academic and arts, recreational, sports, service, social, and general clubs. Among these organizations are the Fire Performance Club, Society for the iGEM, Harmonica Club, Folk Dance Club, Aikido Club, First-Aid Club, and Formula Racing Club. Individual academic departments also maintain their own student associations.

=== Student housing ===
University basketball courts

NCKU operates residence halls for undergraduate and graduate students, with accommodation ranging from shared rooms to individual suites. Dormitory places are allocated through an application and lottery system, with separate procedures for incoming undergraduates, returning undergraduates, and graduate students. International students are also eligible to apply for on-campus accommodation.

The university designates several undergraduate residential communities according to academic and extracurricular interests, including humanities and social concerns in the Sheng-Li dormitories, physical fitness and health in the Kuang-Fu dormitories, and music and the arts in the Ching-Yeh dormitory. The Ching-Yeh residence includes a performance stage, piano, and music practice facilities for residents. The Dong-Ning student residence provides single, double, four-person, and six-person suites, together with communal spaces and discussion rooms.

Residential students are represented by the Student Dormitory Self-Government Committee, which communicates residents' concerns to the university and assists with residence hall administration. The committee also organizes activities including dormitory orientation events, outdoor film screenings, blood drives, sporting competitions, and holiday celebrations.

== Rankings and reputation ==
University rankings

Global – Overall
- ARWU World: 401-500 (2025)
- CWTS World: 265 (2025)
- QS World: 203 (2026)
- THE World: 501-600 (2026)
- USNWR Global: 639 (2023)

Regional – Overall
- QS Asia: 43 (2026)
- THE Asia: 106 (2025)

National – Overall
- QS National: 3 (2025)

National Cheng Kung University has been ranked as the leading university in southern Taiwan and is best known for its engineering and industrial departments. In 2026, Global Views Monthly ranked NCKU second among Taiwanese universities, behind National Taiwan University. Internationally, the university was ranked joint 191th in the 2027 QS World University Rankings and in the 501–600 range in the 2026 Times Higher Education World University Rankings.

The university is noted for its connection with domestic companies in both engineering and applied science. A 2015 study of NCKU's industry relationships documented 1,930 collaborative projects with firms between 2001 and 2009, including contract and joint research, technology transfer, and business incubation. The 2025 Nature Index Research Leaders tables ranked NCKU first among Taiwanese academic institutions in applied sciences, based on research output during 2024. NCKU has also ranked first in Global Views Monthly's survey of Taiwanese employers' preferred university graduates for twelve consecutive years as of 2026.

== List of presidents ==
#	Name	Term start	Term end	Notes	Ref.
1	Wakatsuki Michitaka 若槻道隆	January 1931	August 1941		
2	Sakuma Iwao 佐久間巖	August 1941	March 1944		
3	Shunsuke Suemitsu 末光俊介	March 1944	October 1944	Acting	
4	Kai Saburō 甲斐三郎	October 1944	October 1945		
5	Wang Shih-an 王石安	February 1946	August 1951		
6	Yeh Tung-tse 葉東滋	August 1951	February 1952	Acting	
7	Qing Dajun 秦大鈞	February 1952	July 1957		
8	Yen Cheng-hsing 閻振興	August 1957	December 1964		
9	Lo Yun-ping 羅雲平	January 1965	July 1971		
10	Ni Chao 倪超	August 1971	July 1978		
11	Wang Wei-nung 王唯農	August 1978	July 1980		
12	Hsia Han-min 夏漢民	August 1980	July 1988		
13	Ma Che-ju 馬哲儒	August 1988	July 1994		
14	Wu Jin 吳京	August 1994	June 1996		
15	Huang Ting-chia 黃定加	July 1996	February 1997	Acting	
16	Weng Cheng-yi 翁政義	February 1997	May 2000		
17	Weng Hung-shan 翁鴻山	May 2000	January 2001	Acting	
18	Kao Chiang 高強	February 2001	January 2007		
19	Michael M. C. Lai 賴明詔	February 2007	January 2011		
20	Hwung Hwung-hweng 黃煌煇	February 2011	January 2015		
21	Su Huey-jen 蘇慧貞	February 2015	January 2023		
22	Shen Meng-ru 沈孟儒	February 2023	Present		

== Notable alumni ==
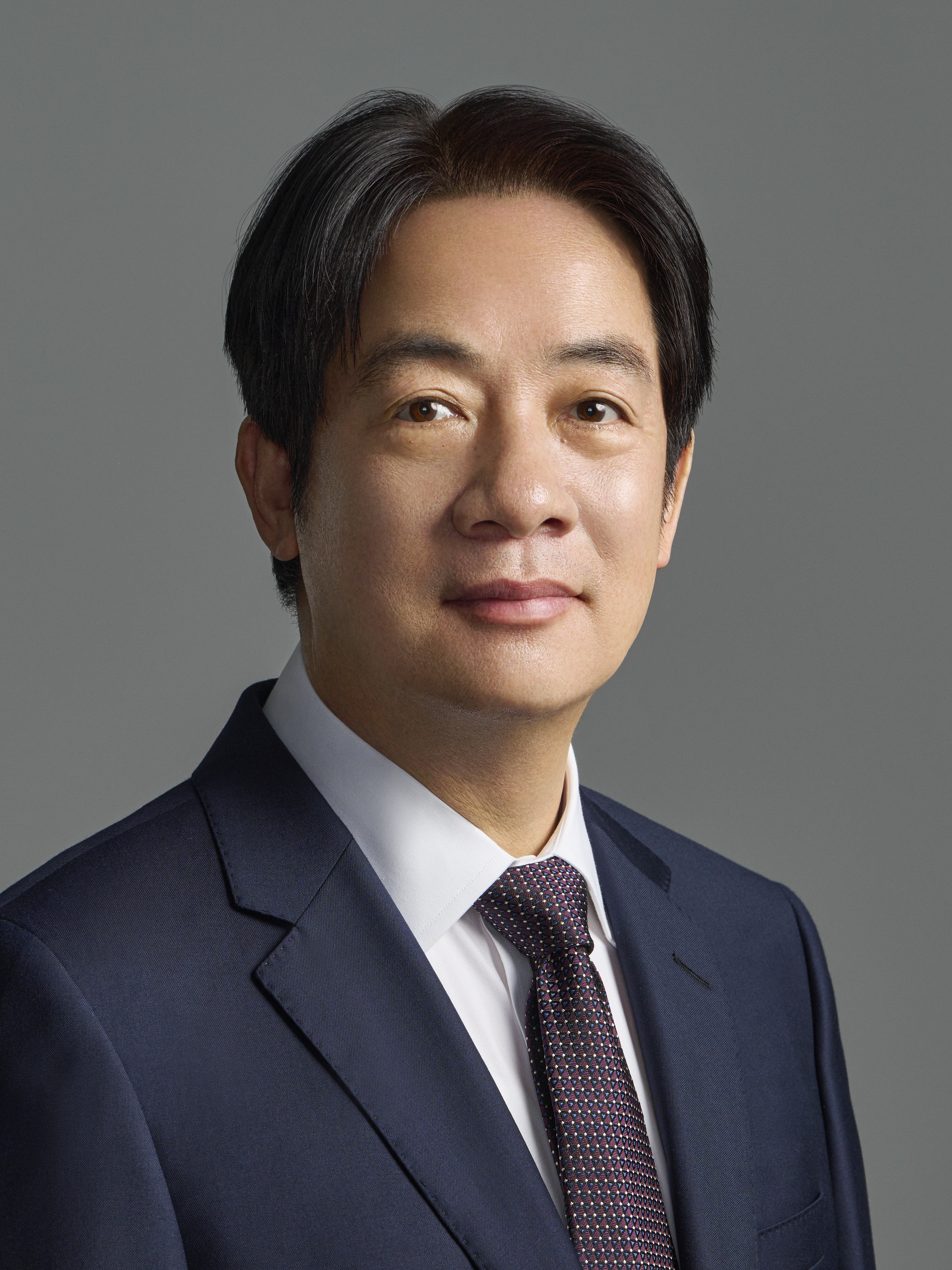
Lai Ching-te,
President of the Republic of China
(MD, 1991)

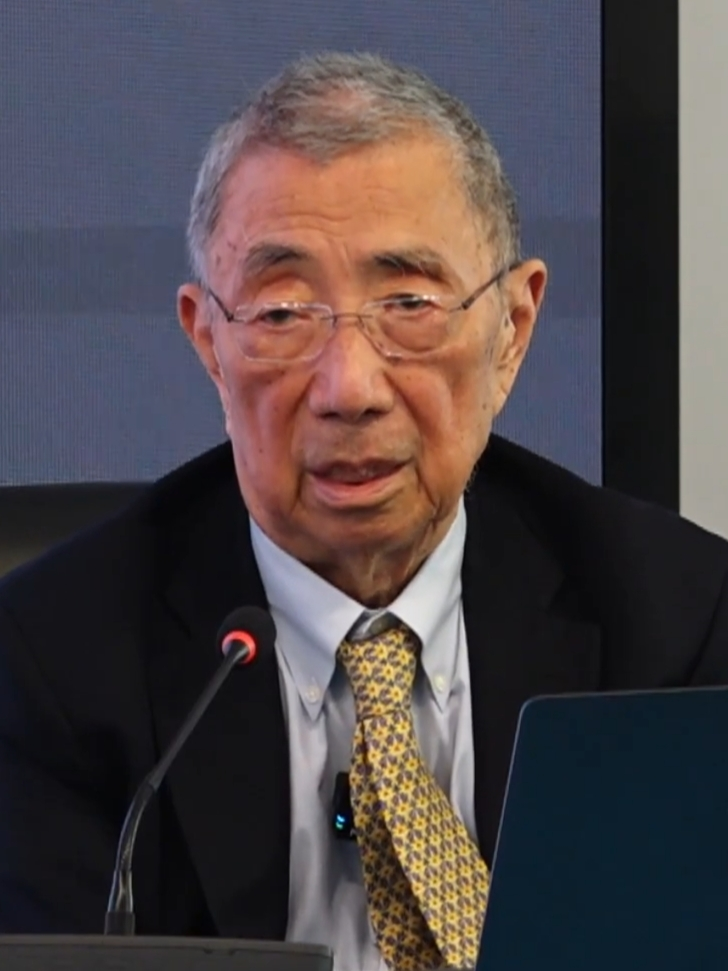
Samuel C. C. Ting,
1976 Nobel laureate in Physics
(Engineering, 1956)

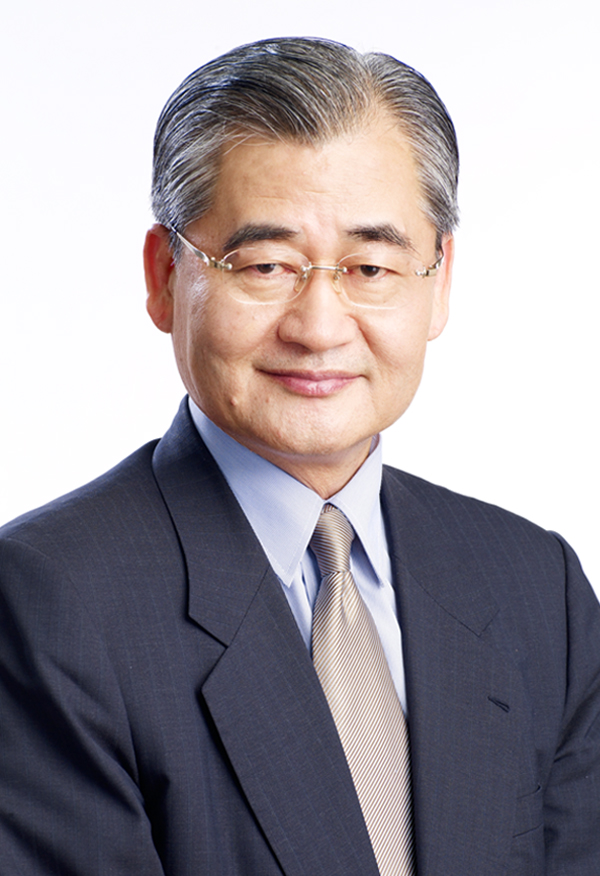
Mao Chi-kuo,
Premier of the Republic of China
(BS, 1971)

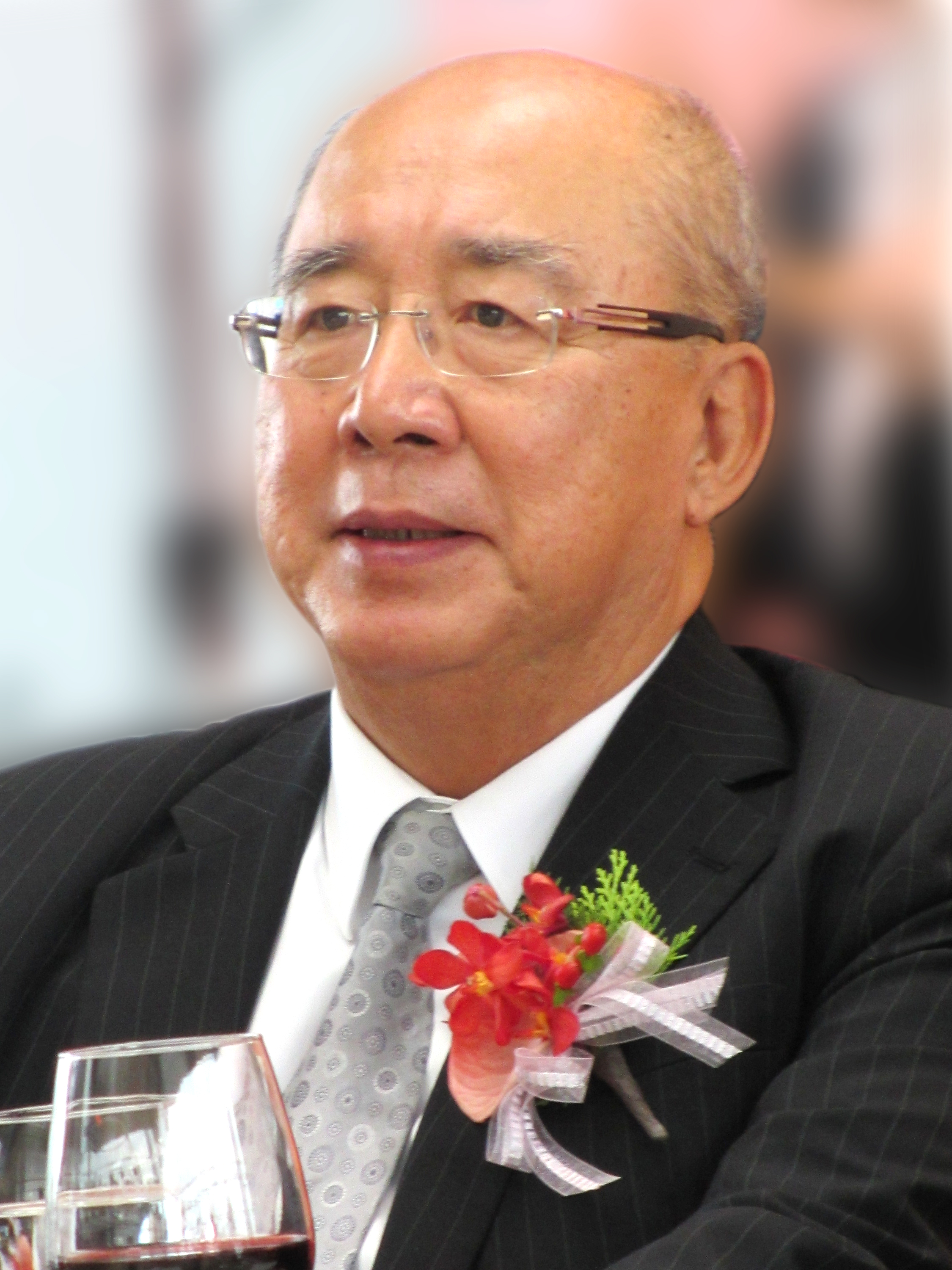
Wu Po-hsiung,
Chairman of the Kuomintang
(BS, 1962)

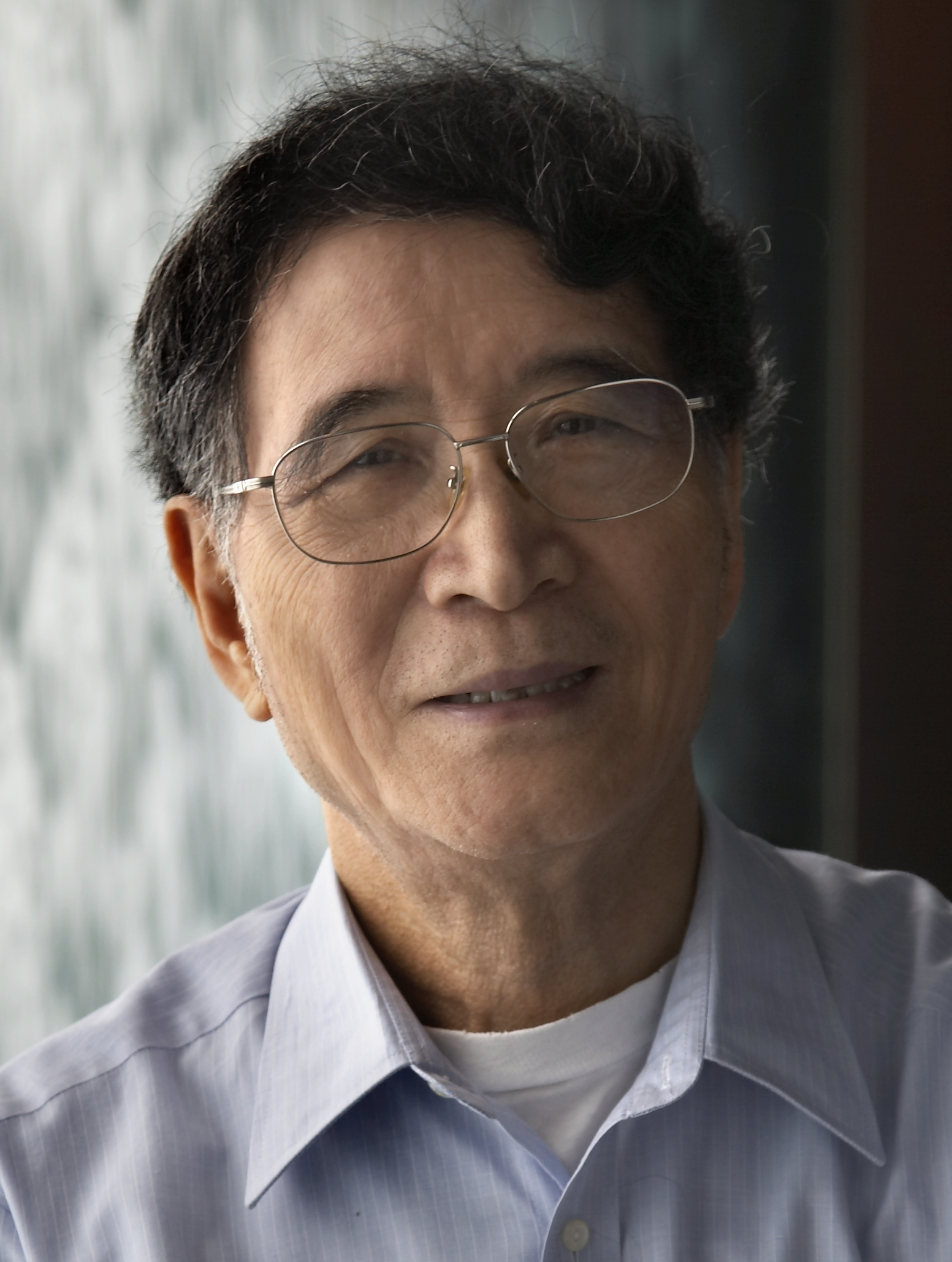
Han Pao-teh,
Architect
(BS, 1958)

National Cheng Kung University has produced notable graduates across politics, science, business, and the arts. Lai Ching-te, the current president of the Republic of China, graduated from NCKU's post-baccalaureate medicine program in 1991 and was awarded the university's distinguished alumni medal in 2013. Other prominent political figures include Mao Chi-kuo, Premier of the Republic of China (2014–2016); Chang Chia-juch, Minister of Economic Affairs (2013–2014); Chen Hsiung-wen, Minister of Labor (2014–2016); Lung Ying-tai, Minister of Culture (2012–2014); Chen Liang-gee, Minister of Science and Technology (2016–2020); Wang Chien-shien, President of the Control Yuan (2008–2014); Wu Po-hsiung, Mayor of Taipei (1988–1990) and later Chairman of the Kuomintang (2007–2009); Fan Chih-ku, Administrative Deputy Minister of Transportation and Communications; Lee Wo-shih, Magistrate of Kinmen County (2009–2014); and Hsu Hsin-ying, founder and Chairperson of the Minkuotang.

In the fields of science and engineering, notable graduates include Tze-Chiang Chen, IBM Fellow and Vice President of Science and Technology at IBM’s Thomas J. Watson Research Center; Ken P. Chong, Director of the Division of Mechanics and Materials at the U.S. National Science Foundation; Chu Ching-wu, a leading superconductor physicist and President of the Taiwan Comprehensive University System; Wei-Kan Chu, professor of physics at the University of Houston; Lin Yi-bing, Vice President of the Office of Research and Development at National Chiao Tung University; Chung Laung Liu, computer scientist; and Wen Ho Lee, the nuclear physicist once accused of espionage. Samuel C. C. Ting, a Nobel Prize laureate in physics, also attended NCKU before returning to the United States. Architect Chu-yuan Lee, who designed Taipei 101, one of the largest skyscrapers in the world, also studied at the university.

Cheng Kung alumni in business and finance include CommonWealth Magazine editor-in-chief Yin Yun-peng (BA'64, foreign languages); Central Daily News editor-in-chief Cheng Pei-fen (BA'66, Chinese literature); China Airlines chairman Kao Shing-Hwang; Philips Taiwan CEO Lo Yi-chiang (BS'63, physics); China Motor Corporation chairman and president Lin Hsin-i (BS'70, mechanical engineering); Delta Electronics founder and chairman Bruce Cheng (BS'59, electrical engineering); Hong Kong Jockey Club CEO Lawrence T. Wong (BS'61, mechanical engineering); Macronix founder Miin Wu (BS'70, electrical engineering); Compal Electronics CEO Chen Jui-tung (BS'71, electrical engineering); Apple Daily president Tung Chun-chieh (董群傑; BA'64, foreign languages); Taiwan Stock Exchange director Ho Show-chung (BS'67, mechanical engineering); TPV Technology CEO Jason Hsuan (BS'68, electrical engineering); architect Cheng Mei (BS'62); architect Jih Pan (BS'63, architecture); publisher Chu An-min (BA'82, Chinese literature); Taiwan High Speed Rail chairman Chiang Yao-chung (BS'74; MS'76, engineering); architect Chang Ching-hwa (BS'79, architecture); Sampo Corporation chairman Chen Sheng-tian (BS'70, hydraulic engineering); Yageo founder and chairman Pierre Chen (BS'80, engineering); and Acer Inc. CEO Jason Chen (BS'84, management science).

In culture and the humanities, Cheng Nan-jung and Pai Hsien-yung both began their studies in engineering at NCKU before shifting to the humanities and went on to become prominent public intellectuals and writers. In addition, NCKU has many international alumni who have studied Mandarin Chinese at the university, such as Mike Frerichs, the state treasurer of Illinois.

== See also ==
- National Cheng Kung University Hospital
- Taiwan Comprehensive University System
- List of universities in Taiwan
