= National Taiwan University =

National university located in Taipei, Taiwan

- 國立臺灣大學
- Former name: Taihoku Imperial University (1928–1945)
- Motto: 敦品勵學，愛國愛人 (Note: pinyin: Dūnpǐn Lìxué, àiguó àirén)
- Motto in English: Integrity, Diligence, Fidelity, Compassion
- Type: National research university
- Established: March 16, 1928; 98 years ago
- Affiliations: APRU; AEARU; ASAIHL; AACSB; EUTW
- Endowment: $67.3 billion NTD (2024) ($2.24 billion USD)
- President: Chen Wen-chang
- Academic staff: 3,981 (2021)
- Administrative staff: 6,765 (2020–21)
- Undergraduates: 16,773 (2021)
- Postgraduates: 12,533 (2021)
- Doctoral students: 3,668 (2021)
- Location: Taipei, Taiwan; 25.016°N 121.536°E
- Campus: Urban, 1.6 km^{2} (0.62 sq mi) (Greater Taipei combined); 344 km^{2} (133 sq mi) (Nantou County combined)
- Colors: Maroon and Gold
- Website: www.ntu.edu.tw

Chinese name
- Traditional Chinese: 國立臺灣大學
- Simplified Chinese: 国立台湾大学
Transcriptions
Standard Mandarin
- Hanyu Pinyin: Guólì Táiwān Dàxué
- Bopomofo: ㄍㄨㄛˊ ㄌㄧˋ ㄊㄞˊ ㄨㄢ ㄉㄚˋ ㄒㄩㄝˊ
- Gwoyeu Romatzyh: Gwolih Tair'uan Dahshyue
- Wade–Giles: Kuo²-li⁴ T'ai²-wan¹ Ta⁴-hsüeh²
- Tongyong Pinyin: Guólì Táiwan Dàsyué
- MPS2: Guólì Táiwān Dàshiué
Hakka
- Romanization: Koet-li̍p Thòi-vân Thai-ho̍k
Southern Min
- Hokkien POJ: Kok-li̍p Tâi-oân Tāi-ha̍k
- Tâi-lô: Kok-li̍p Tâi-uân Tāi-ha̍k

Taihoku Imperial University
- Traditional Chinese: 臺北帝國大學
- Simplified Chinese: 台北帝国大学
Transcriptions
Standard Mandarin
- Hanyu Pinyin: Táipěi Dìguó Dàxué
- Bopomofo: ㄊㄞˊ ㄅㄟˇ ㄉㄧˋ ㄍㄨㄛˊ ㄉㄚˋ ㄒㄩㄝˊ
- Gwoyeu Romatzyh: Tairbeei Dihgwo Dahshyue
- Wade–Giles: T'ai²-pei³ Ti⁴-kuo² Ta⁴-hsüeh²
- Tongyong Pinyin: Táipěi Dìguó Dàsyué
- MPS2: Táipěi Dìguó Dàshiué
Hakka
- Romanization: Thòi-pet Ti-koet Thai-ho̍k
Southern Min
- Hokkien POJ: Tâi-pak Tè-kok Tāi-ha̍k
- Tâi-lô: Tâi-pak Tè-kok Tāi-ha̍k

Alternative Japanese name
- Kanji: 台北帝国大学
Transcriptions
- Revised Hepburn: Taihoku Teikoku Daigaku

National Taiwan University (NTU; Chinese: 國立臺灣大學; pinyin: Guólì Táiwān Dàxué) is a public research university in Taipei, Taiwan. Founded in 1928 during Japanese rule as Taihoku Imperial University (Japanese: 臺北帝國大學, romanized: Taihoku Teikoku Daigaku), it was the seventh Imperial University of the Empire of Japan and is the oldest university in Taiwan.

The university has three major campuses in Taipei and operates satellite campuses across the country. It hosts over 200 degree programs and consists of 17 colleges, including the College of Medicine, and 61 departments, 152 affiliated research institutes, and more than 100 other national research centers, such as the National Taiwan University Hospital. Its financial endowment of NT$67.3 billion (US$2.24 billion) is the largest in the country and one of the largest in Asia.

National Taiwan University has institutional affiliations with the Harvard–Yenching Institute, the Max Planck Society, the Institute for Advanced Study, and produces the Performance Ranking of Scientific Papers for World Universities. It publishes academic works through its university press, the National Taiwan University Press. In 2015, NTU formed a university system with the National Taiwan University of Science and Technology and National Taiwan Normal University.

Notable graduates of the university include five presidents of the Republic of China, six vice-presidents of the Republic of China, more than 120 members of Academia Sinica, and 25 members of the U.S. National Academy of Sciences, in addition to Nobel Prize, (Note: Chemist Yuan T. Lee, a 1959 graduate of National Taiwan University, won the 1986 Nobel Prize in Chemistry with John C. Polanyi and Dudley R. Herschbach.) Turing Award, (Note: After graduating from NTU in 1967, Andrew Yao earned a Ph.D. in physics from Harvard University and a second doctorate from the University of Illinois at Urbana-Champaign. He was awarded the Turing Award in 2000 for contributions to computer science.) and Wolf Prize laureates. (Note: Botanist Shang Fa Yang graduated with his bachelor's degree and his master's degree from NTU In 1956 and 1958, respectively, and was awarded the 1991 Wolf Prize in Agriculture. Biochemist Chi-Huey Wong graduated from NTU with his bachelor's degree and master's degree in 1970 and 1977, respectively, and received the 2014 Wolf Prize in Chemistry.) It has also produced the heads of other major universities, such as the University of California, Berkeley, (Note: Alumnus Chang-Lin Tien, who earned his Bachelor of Science in mechanical engineering from NTU in 1955, served as the chancellor of the University of California, Berkeley, from 1990 to 1997.) and the University of California, Santa Barbara. (Note: Alumnus Henry T. Yang, who earned his Bachelor of Science in civil engineering from NTU in 1962, served as the chancellor of the University of California, Santa Barbara, from 1994 to 2025.)

== History ==
=== Imperial University (1928–1945) ===
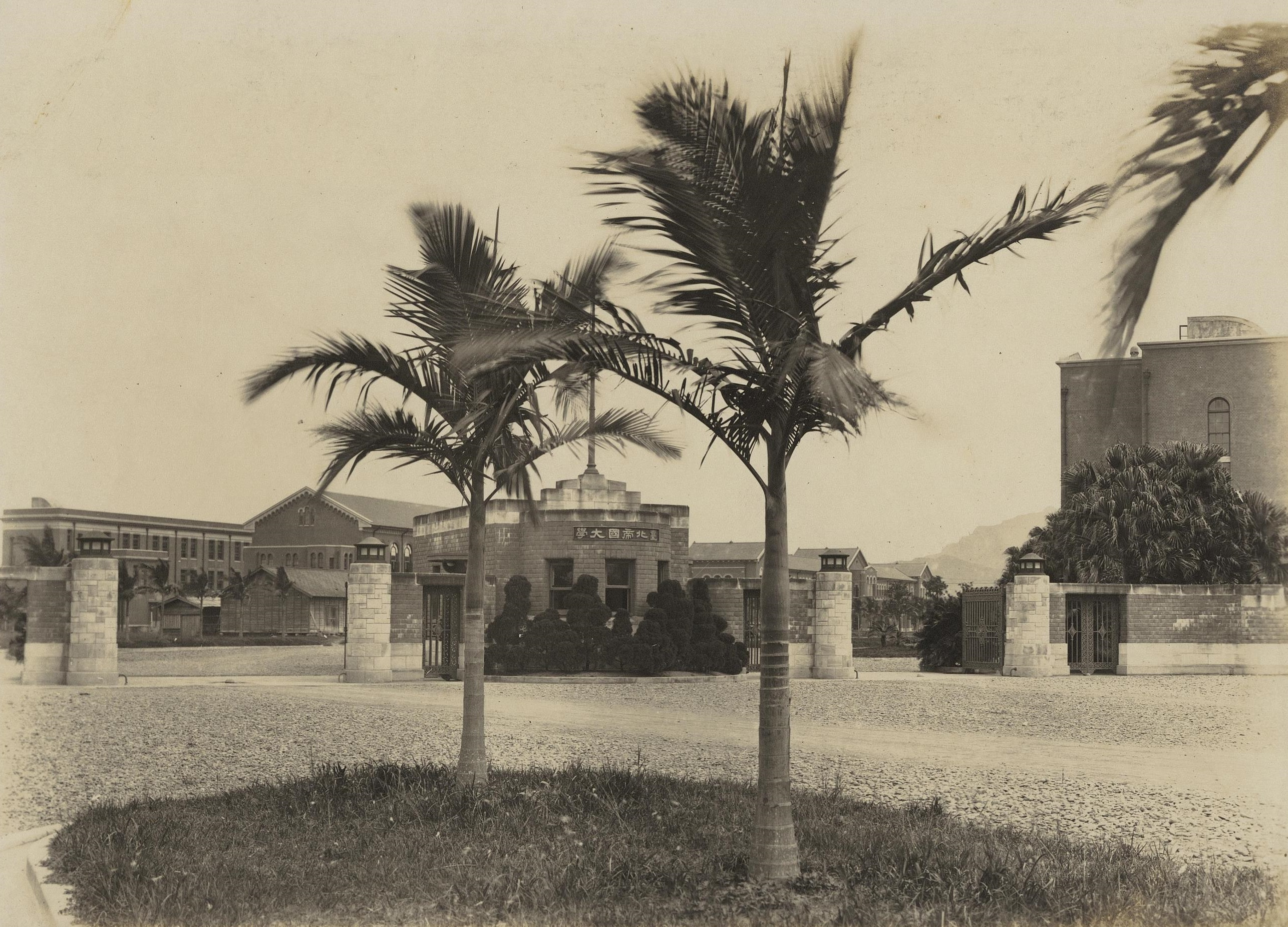
View of the entrance of Taihoku Imperial University, pictured during Japanese colonial rule (1895–1945)

During the Japanese rule of Taiwan (1895–1945), the Empire of Japan established the modern Taiwanese education system by installing educational institutions that used Western-style academic systems. Den Kenjirō, the Governor-General of Taiwan, proposed the establishment of a university in Taiwan in 1922 and Japanese prime minister Tanaka Giichi presented a bill titled "Establishment of the Taiwan Imperial University" to the Cabinet of Japan on February 25, 1928. It was planned to be located on the grounds of the Taihoku Senior School of Agriculture and Forestry in Taihoku Prefecture.

On March 16, 1928, National Taiwan University was founded as "Taihoku Imperial University" (Japanese: 台北帝国大学, romanized: Taihoku Teikoku Daigaku; Chinese: 臺北帝國大學; pinyin: Táiběi dìguó dàxué), the seventh of the Japanese Empire's Imperial Universities. It was Taiwan's first and only university and primarily served to promote Japanese culture, assimilate the local population, and direct students to professions useful to colonial expansion. The first freshman class was inaugurated on April 30, 1928, with classes beginning on May 5. Of the 1931 graduating class, 41 students were Japanese and five were Taiwanese. (Note: The five Taiwanese graduates were: Seth Mackay Ko (History), De-Jyun Jhong (Politics), Ching-chung Hsu (Agriculture), Sing-wun Liu (Agriculture), and Yu-ze Cai (Agriculture).)

The first faculties founded at Taihoku Imperial University were the Faculty of Literature and Politics and the Faculty of Science and Agriculture, totalling 59 students. Subsequently, the Faculty of Medicine was established in 1935 and the Faculty of Engineering was established in 1943. The Faculty of Science and Agriculture was divided in 1943 as two separate colleges: the Faculty of Science and the Faculty of Agriculture. Because the university was considered a part of expanding the Japanese colonial empire in the Pacific Ocean, it was supported by multiple Japanese scholars and received government research grants for funding policy programs. Taiwanese students could not compete with Japanese students since the university prioritized Japanese enrollment. From 1928 to 1943, the university's student body was approximately 80 percent Japanese and 20 percent Taiwanese. Of its more than 300 faculty members in 1940, all professorships but one were held by Japanese scholars.

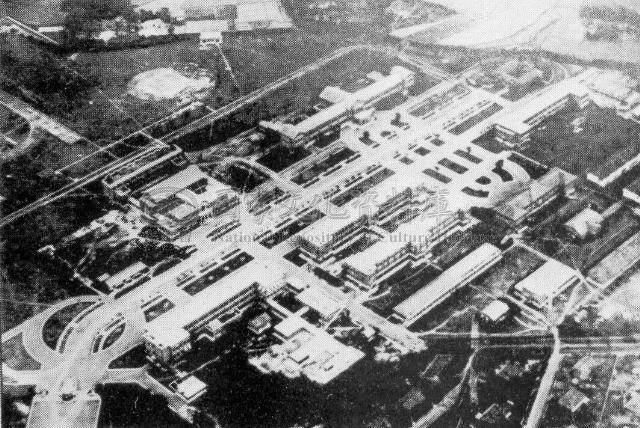
Aerial view of the university during the 1930s

Taihoku granted degrees after a minimum of six years of study. College classes consisted of lectures taught by professors, assistant professors, and other faculty. By 1945, it had five colleges with a total of 114 lecture courses. The university's first president was Japanese historian Taira Shidehara (1928–1937), a graduate of Tokyo Imperial University who was appointed to the presidency on March 16, 1928. Japanese scholar Toyohachi Fujita (1869–1929) was appointed as the first dean of the Faculty of Literature and Politics while Kintaro Oshima was named the inaugural dean of the Faculty of Science and Agriculture. Enrollment years were shortened during World War II and university functions were limited following the American bombing of Taipei, which damaged its main gate and boulevard.

=== National University (1945–present) ===
Taiwanese president Chiang Ching-kuo (left) visiting NTU in 1977

After the Surrender of Japan in September 1945, the government of the Republic of China (ROC) assumed control of the university and initiated sinicization reforms. On August 15, 1945, the Kuomintang government appointed Lo Tsung-lo, a Japanese-educated academic, to oversee the transition of Taihoku's curriculum, teaching system, and faculties from its Japanese administration. At the time, the university had 1,614 faculty and staff members to teach 1,767 students, 351 of whom were Taiwanese. All Japanese students were later transferred back to Japan.

Under the Kuomintang, the ROC government initiated a program of reforming all universities and colleges in accordance with Chinese models that incorporated American academics, administration, and organization, in addition to installing American curriculum and degree requirements. Reforms also had the goal of reversing the Japanization that had influenced Taiwan during Japanese rule. Universities and colleges were opened to Taiwanese students without restrictions; Taihoku Imperial University was renamed "National Taiwan University" in November 1945 and it was reorganized and expanded to six faculties: Liberal Arts, Law, Science, Medicine, Engineering, and Agriculture. Up to 500 students could enroll in each faculty and the enrollment period was standardized to four years as opposed to the Japanese system of three to six years. Under governor Chen Yi, however, the school received no government funding from 1945 to 1947, causing it to cease operations until Chinese historian Fu Ssu-nien assumed the presidency. Fu oversaw the abolition of the Japanese college-preparatory school system and, by the end of 1947, the university operated entirely on a Chinese higher education model. The university became the most prominent educational institution in the country, with more than 80 percent of all Taiwanese high school applicants listing the university as their preferred choice for college admission by 1977.

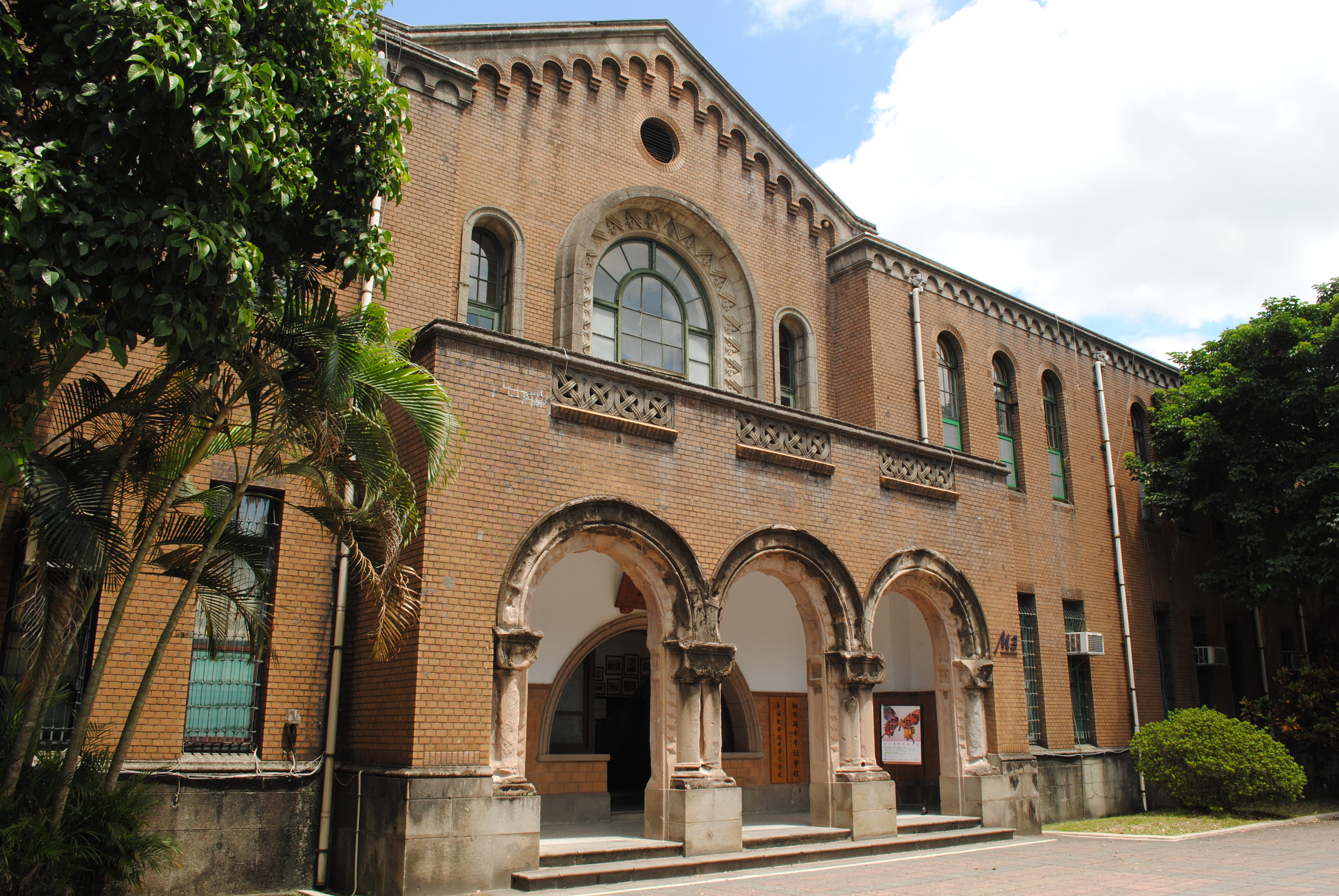
The Old Main Library building (pictured) was repurposed as a gallery dedicated to NTU's history.

In the following decades after World War II, National Taiwan University underwent rapid expansion. A night school was established to provide continuing education for adults in 1955 and the NTU Research Library was completed in 1968. The College of Management, the College of Public Health, and the College of Electrical Engineering were established in 1987, 1993, and 1997, respectively. The NTU Department of Law was expanded to the NTU College of Law in 1999 and the College of Life Science was established in 2003. In November 2003, the university consisted of ten colleges, 52 academic departments, 82 graduate institutes, 1,778 full-time faculty, and more than 27,000 students. By 2009, NTU grew to 54 departments, 100 graduate institutes (which offered 100 master's programs and 91 doctoral programs in total), and 25 research centers, including the Center for Condensed Matter Sciences, the Center for Biotechnology, the Japanese Research Center, and others.

== Campus ==
=== Main campus ===
Map of National Taiwan University's main campus Academic instruction Administration and services Museums and cultural venues Student life, housing and dining Open spaces and landmarks Sports and recreation NTU main campus boundary

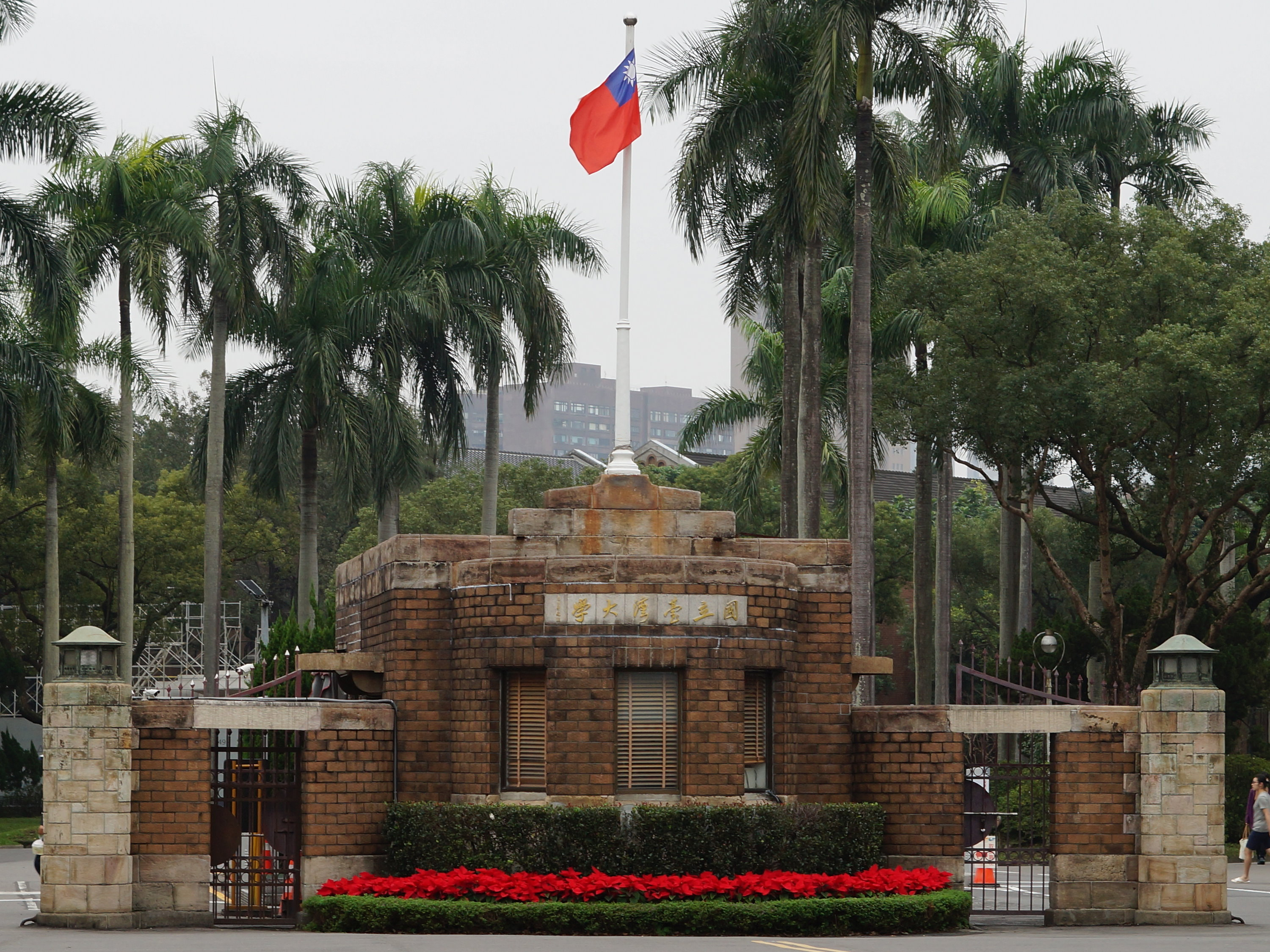
The Main Gate marks the university's entrance

The main campus of National Taiwan University occupies 114.72 hectares (283.5 acres) in the Da'an District of Taipei, with its principal entrance at 1 Roosevelt Road, Section 4. The site includes most of the university's colleges and administrative buildings. It houses some of the country's best-preserved examples of red brick Japanese colonial architecture.

The campus developed from the grounds of an agricultural and forestry school established by the Government-General of Taiwan in 1919, which was successively reorganized before being incorporated into Taihoku Imperial University in 1928. Much of the historic core constructed after the imperial university's establishment survives along Royal Palm Boulevard, an east–west avenue that forms the principal axis of the campus. Its original plan was influenced by American Beaux-Arts, Renaissance, and neoclassical planning principles, with a Baroque axis and terminal vistas organizing the central campus. Royal Palm Boulevard itself was laid out around 1932, when horticultural faculty and farm staff planted royal palms and other tropical and native vegetation throughout the grounds. The boulevard forms three plazas along its axis—University Plaza, Fu Bell Plaza, and the Main Library plaza—which altogether function as student venues.

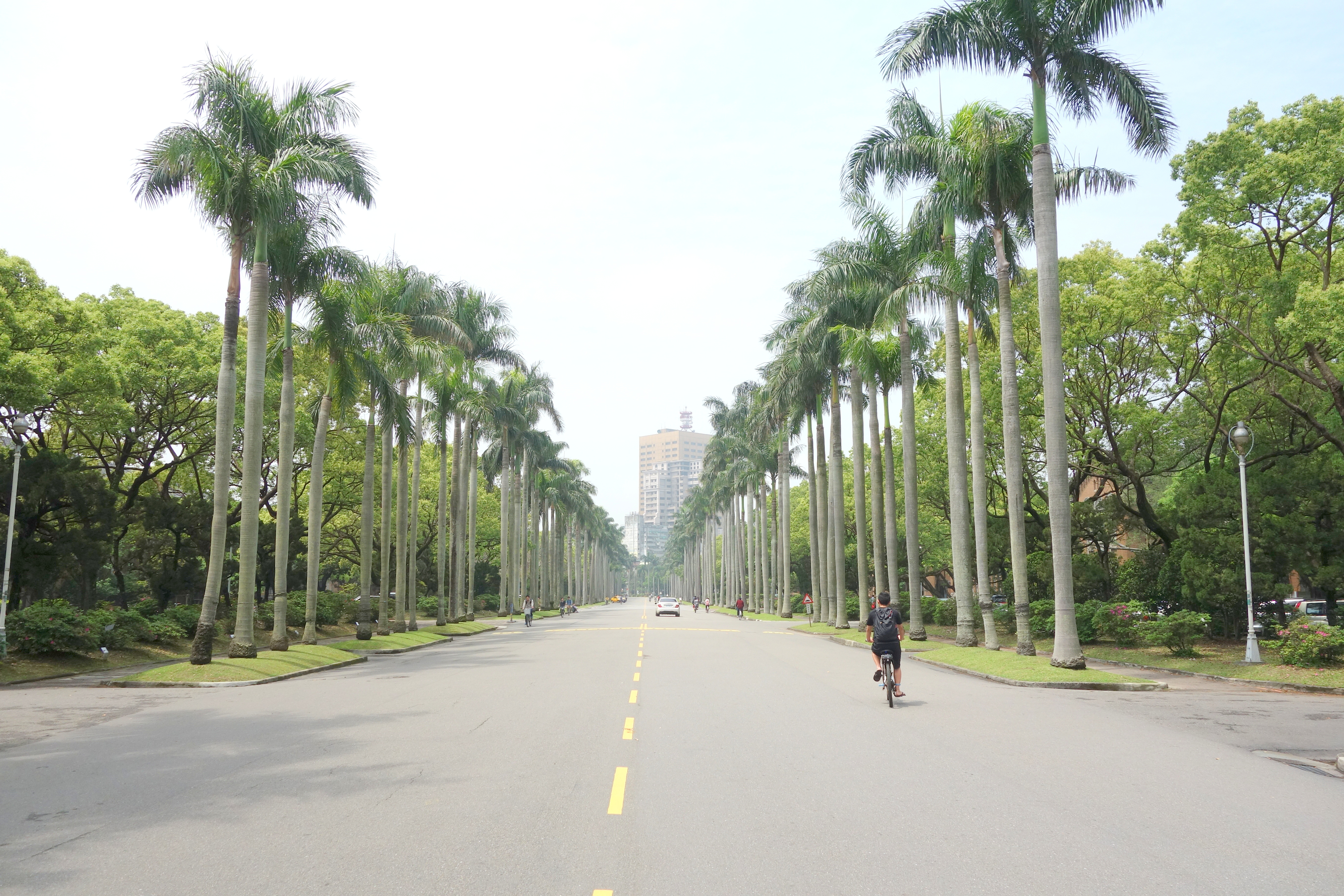
Royal Palm Boulevard forms the east–west axis of the main campus

Several buildings that predate or date from the early years of Taihoku Imperial University remain prominent features of the campus. Of the campus buildings built after World War II, the majority are a hybrid of Chinese and Western architecture, 20 of which were designed by architect Wang Da-hong. The Administration Building, completed in 1926 for the predecessor Taihoku Advanced Academy of Agronomy and Forestry, is a Taipei city-designated heritage site constructed primarily of red brick and distinguished by a portico supported by four Corinthian columns. Across Royal Palm Boulevard, the College of Liberal Arts building was completed in 1929 for the Faculty of Literature and Politics and is another city-designated heritage site. Its exterior combines ribbed tile with Romanesque elements, including arched windows and doorways, gables, and ornamental corner tiles characteristic of the imperial-era buildings lining the boulevard. The former main library was begun in 1929, with its stacks and reading room completed in 1931, and now houses the Gallery of NTU History.

The campus continued to expand following the reorganization of the imperial university as National Taiwan University in 1945, gradually introducing modernist forms alongside the earlier eclectic architecture. The Civil Engineering Building, completed in 1955, was among the first postwar structures to depart substantially from the earlier campus vocabulary, using horizontal lines associated with the International Style rather than the stronger vertical emphasis of the buildings along Royal Palm Boulevard. The First Student Activity Center, designed by Taiwanese architect Wang Da-hong in 1961 and completed in the early 1960s, combined modern construction with features drawn from traditional Chinese architecture, including red, black, and gold surfaces, courtyards, porticos, and folded roofs.

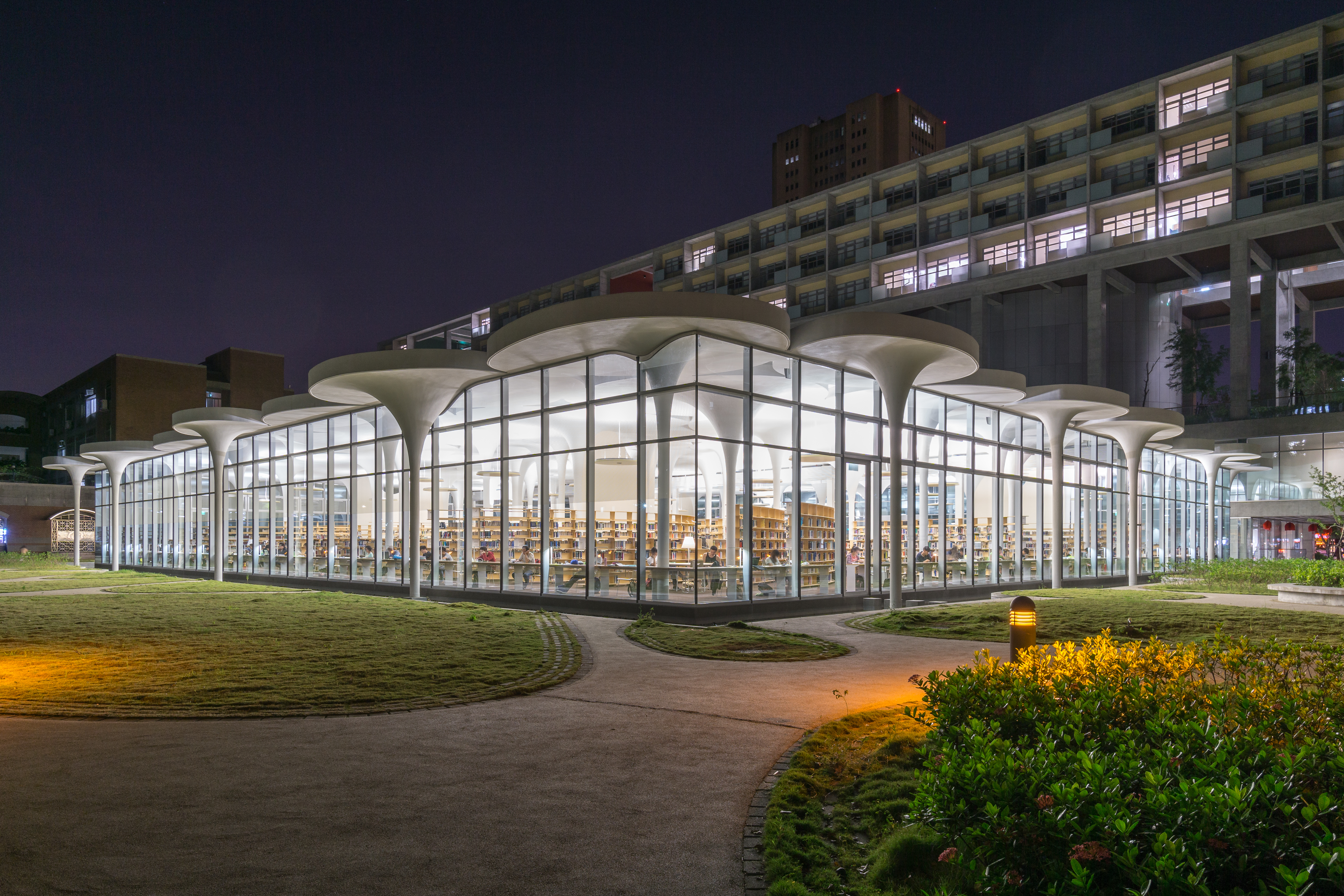
Koo Chen-Fu Memorial Library, designed by Japanese architect Toyo Ito

A renewed period of campus planning beginning around the 1980s sought to reconcile later development with the surviving imperial-era plan. The present Main Library, completed in 1998 at the eastern end of Royal Palm Boulevard, contains five stories above ground and one below and incorporates arched windows and other architectural motifs derived from the earlier campus buildings. More recent additions have introduced contemporary architecture into the historic campus plan, including the College of Social Sciences complex designed by Japanese architect Toyo Ito. Its Koo Chen-Fu Memorial Library is enclosed on three sides by floor-to-ceiling glass and supported internally by 88 irregularly arranged columns, with curved bamboo bookshelves intended to give the reading room the appearance of a grove. The Humanities Building, one of the newest major buildings near the entrance to campus, uses exposed concrete and a perforated brick façade facing Royal Palm Boulevard, with large-span bridges connecting portions of the structure. In 2024, the building received first place in the public construction and space revitalization category of Taiwan's Golden Stone Awards.

The main campus contains a number of landscaped areas interspersed among its academic buildings. These include Drunken Moon Lake, the Liugongjun Pool, Fu Garden, the agricultural experimental farm, and the lawns and tree-lined avenues surrounding Royal Palm Boulevard. The campus's main gate, built in 1931 together with its guardhouse, survives as part of the original imperial-university complex. Royal Palm Boulevard remains the principal pedestrian axis through the center of campus, extending toward the Main Library at its eastern end.

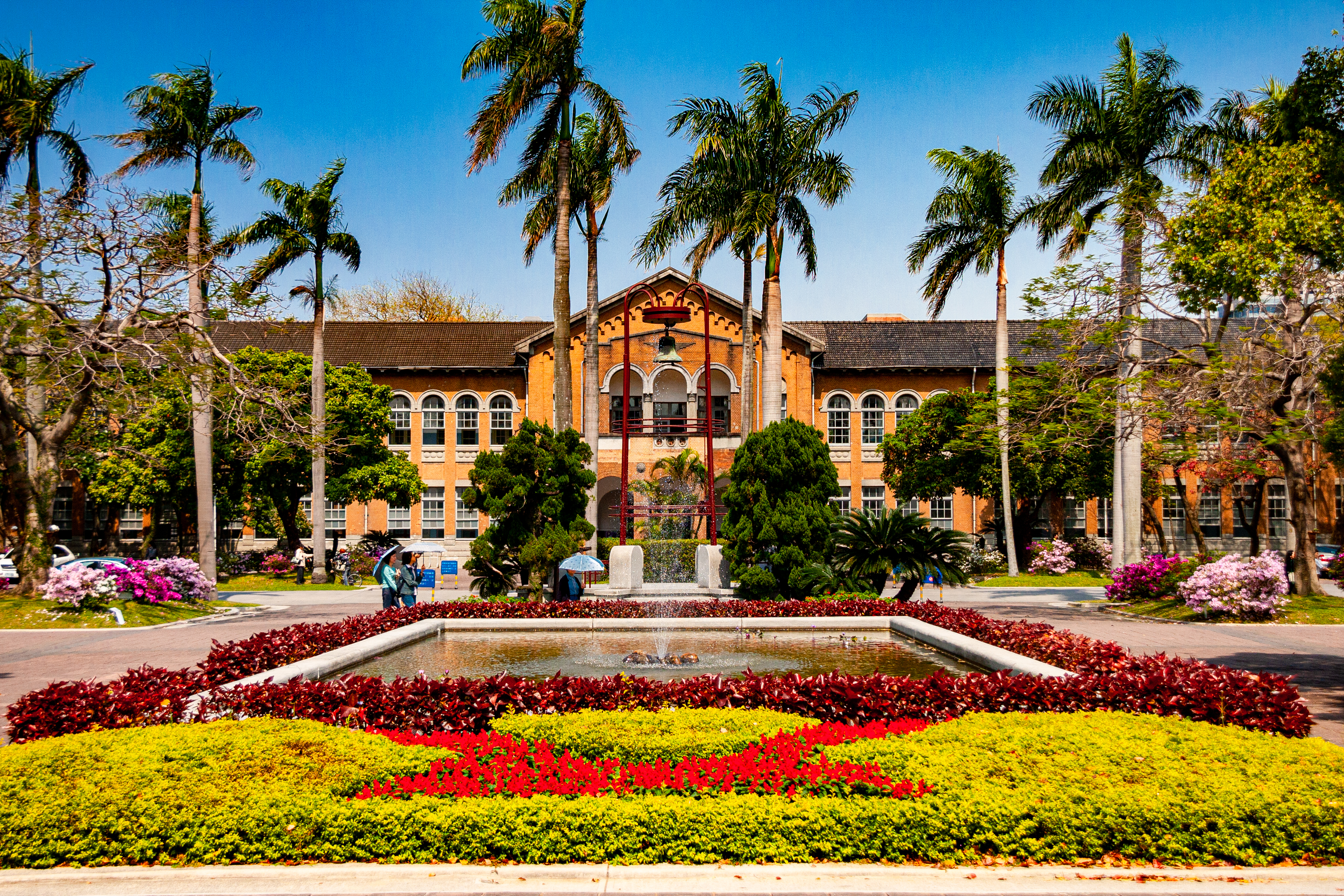
College of Liberal Arts

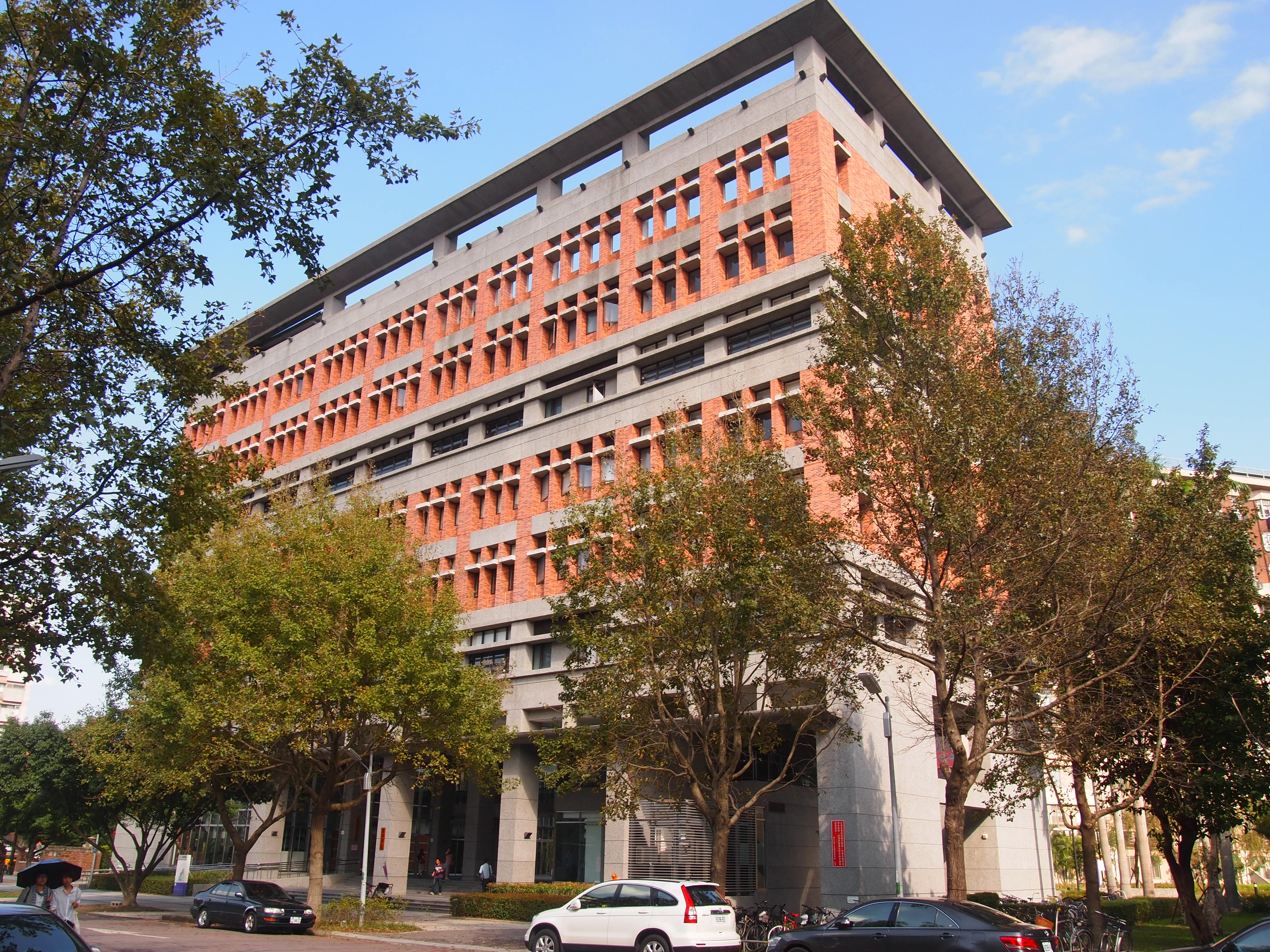
College of Law

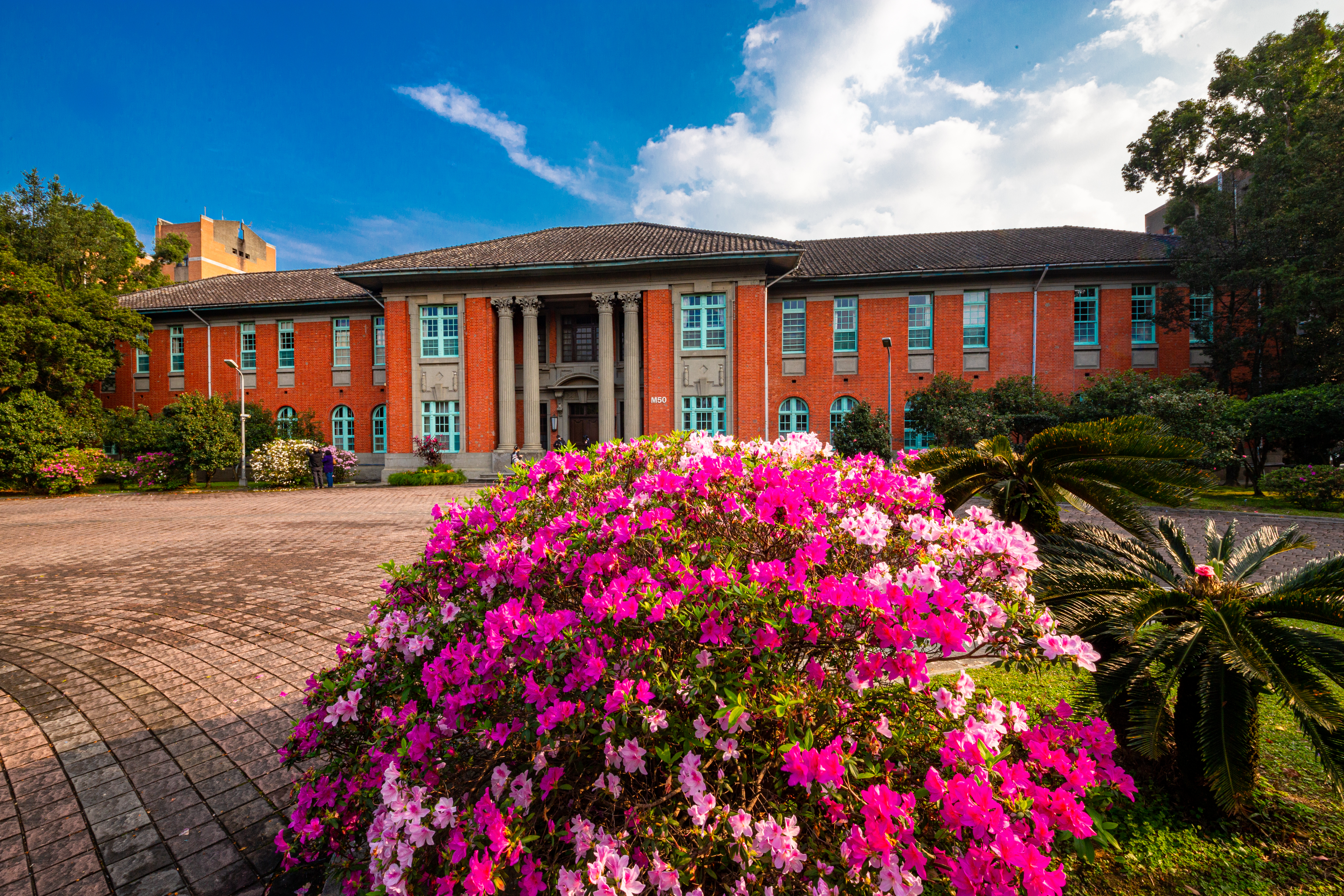
Administration Building

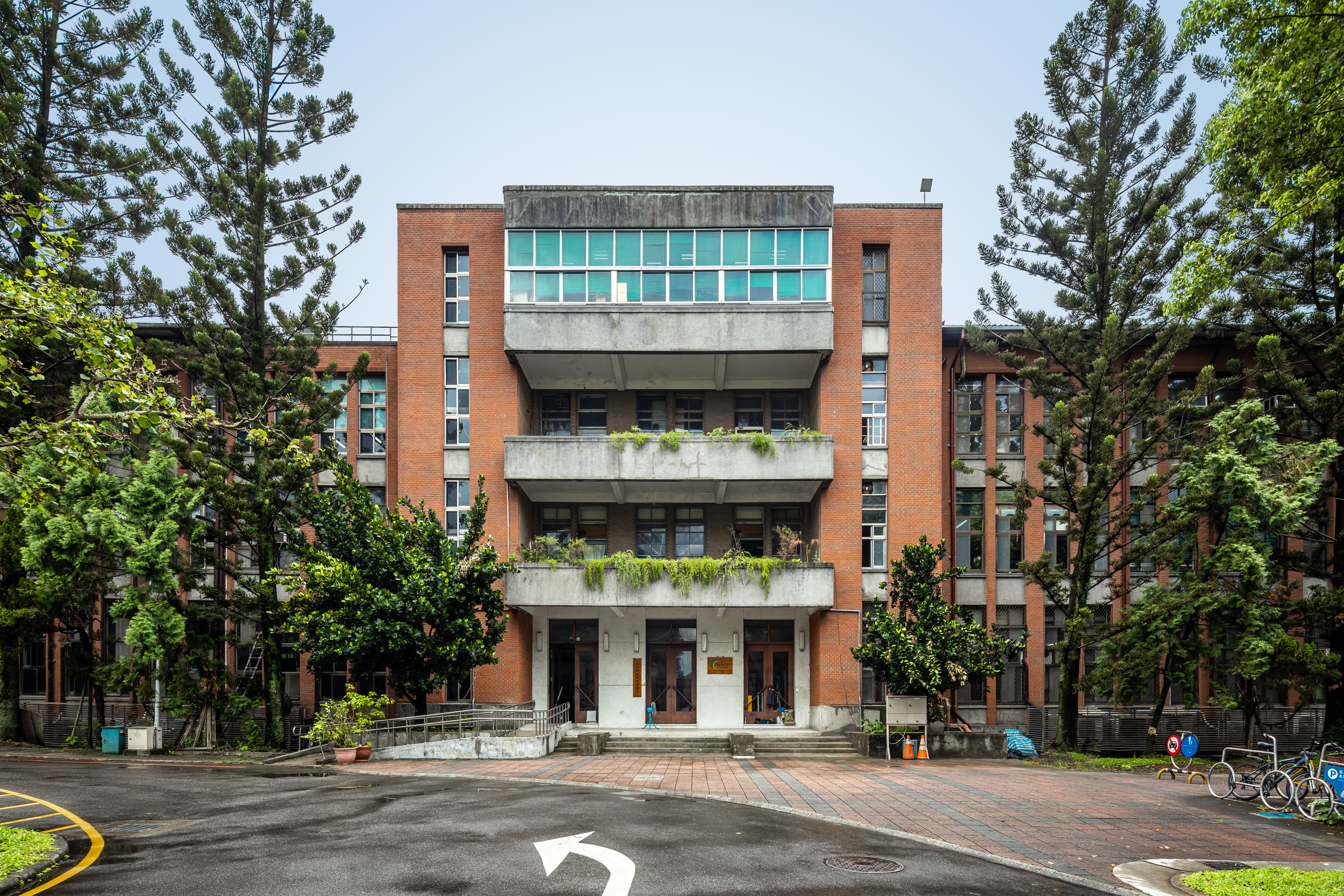
Department of Forestry

Applied Mechanics Building

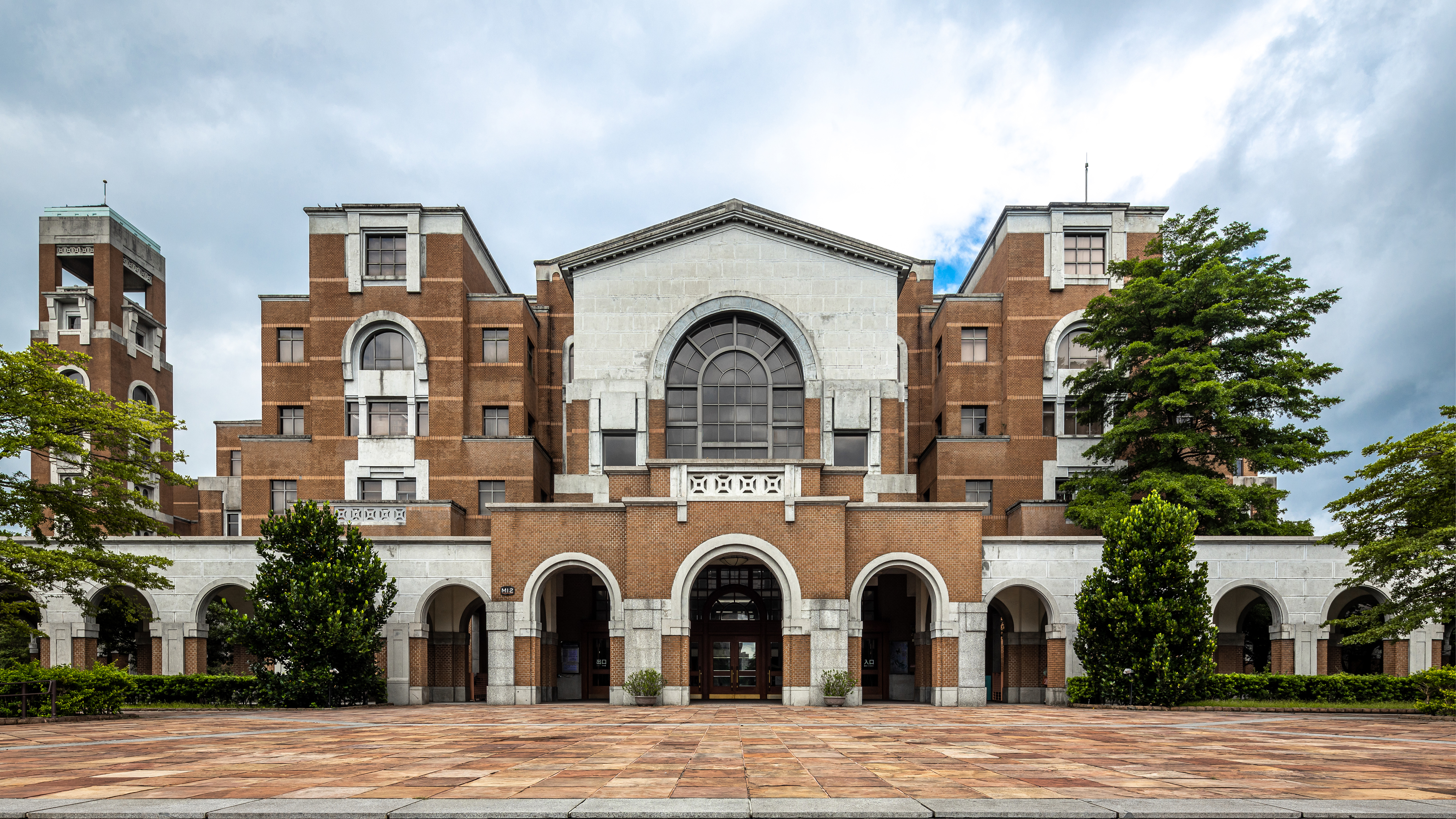
National Taiwan University Library

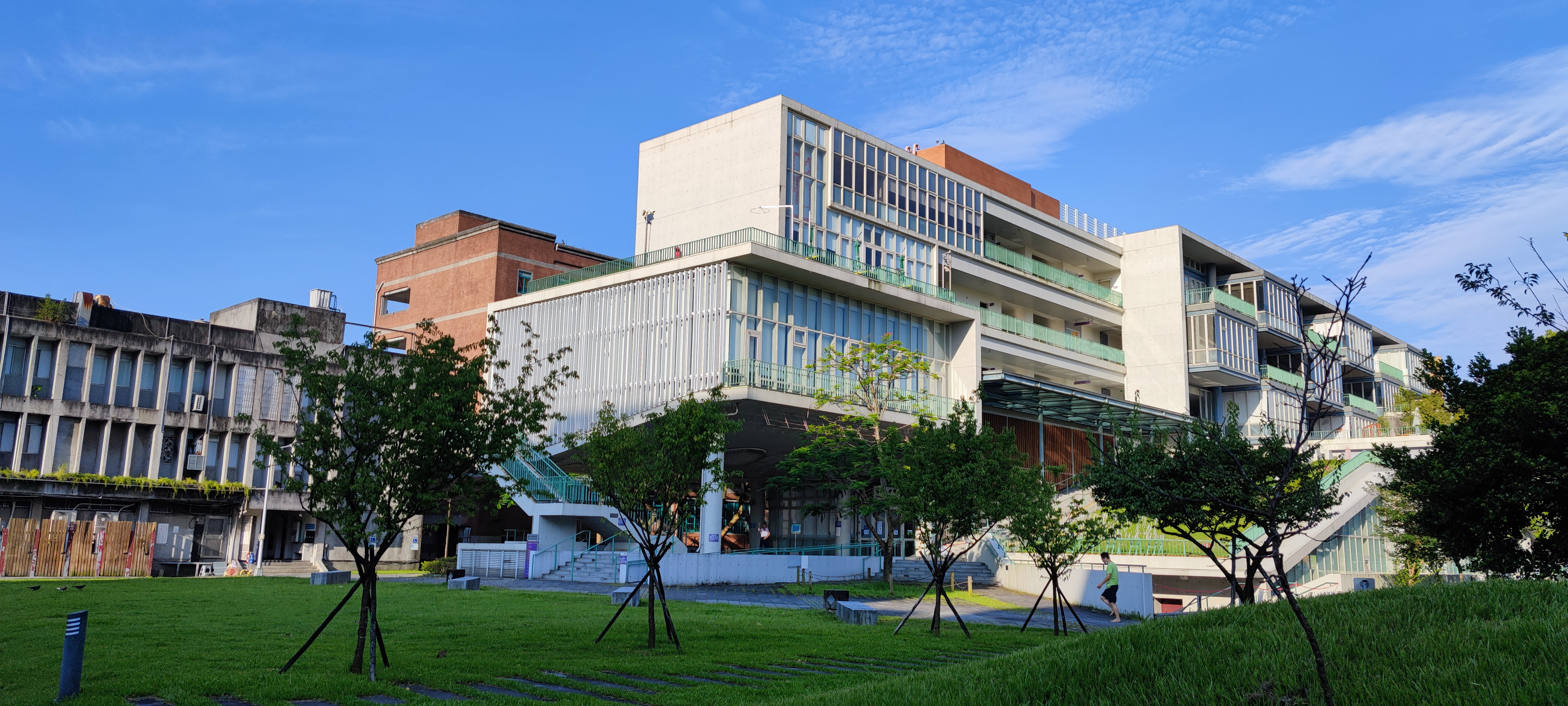
Education Center

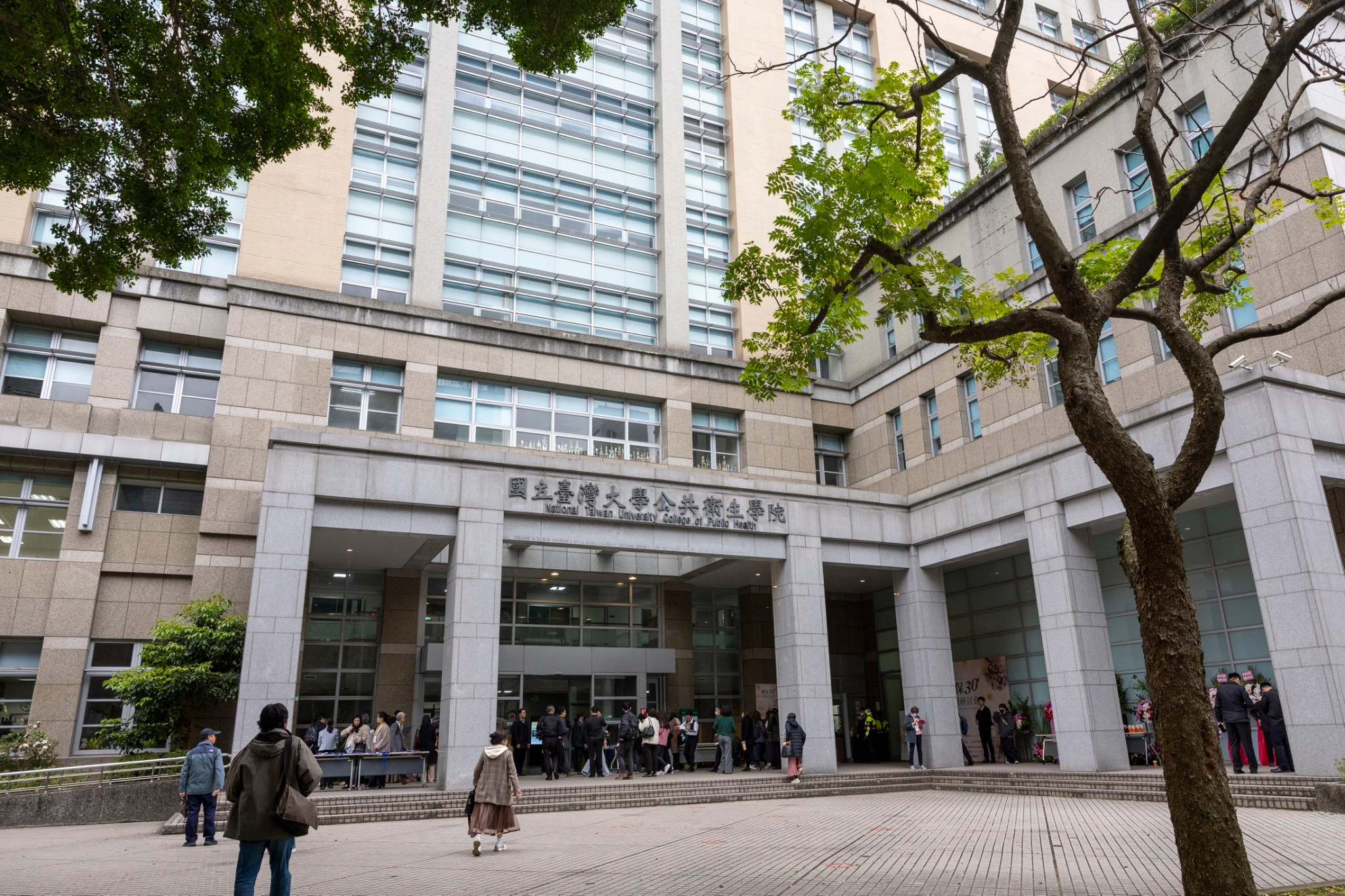
College of Public Health

==== Transportation ====
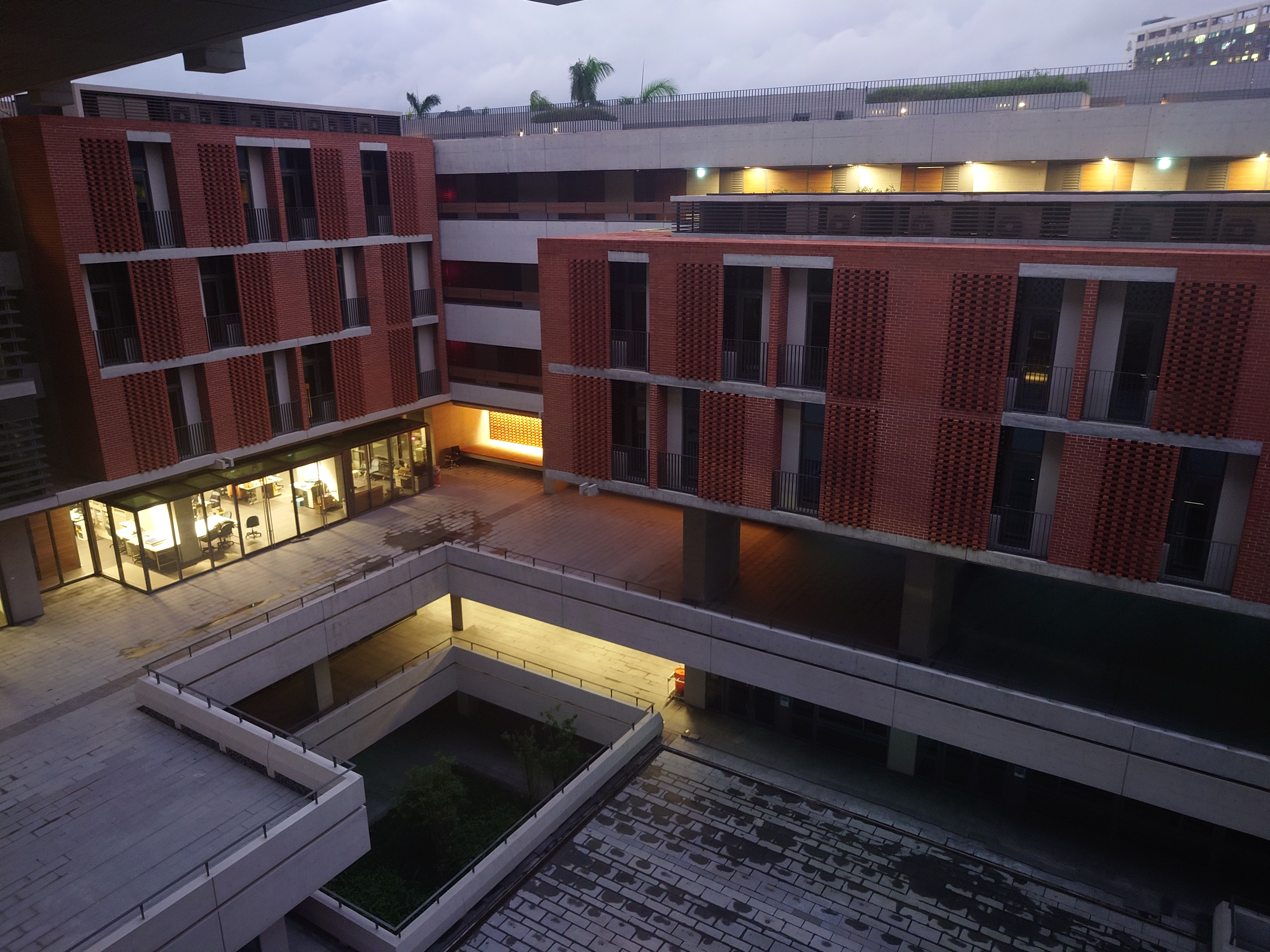
The Humanities Building, a complex of the College of Liberal Arts

The main campus is adjacent to Gongguan metro station on the Songshan–Xindian line of the Taipei Metro; Exit 3 is approximately a three-minute walk from the main entrance, while Exit 2 provides direct access to the entrance at Roosevelt Road and Zhoushan Road. The northeastern portion of the campus can also be reached from Technology Building metro station on the Wenhu line by walking south along Fuxing South Road to the Xinhai Road entrance. City bus routes serve stops along Roosevelt Road, Xinsheng South Road, and the surrounding streets.

Walking and cycling are common forms of transportation within the main campus, and bicycle-sharing stations are located around the university and its neighboring metro stations. NTU also operates shuttle services linking the main campus with the College of Medicine and other university facilities, as well as a service connecting the university with Academia Sinica.

=== Satellite campuses and facilities ===
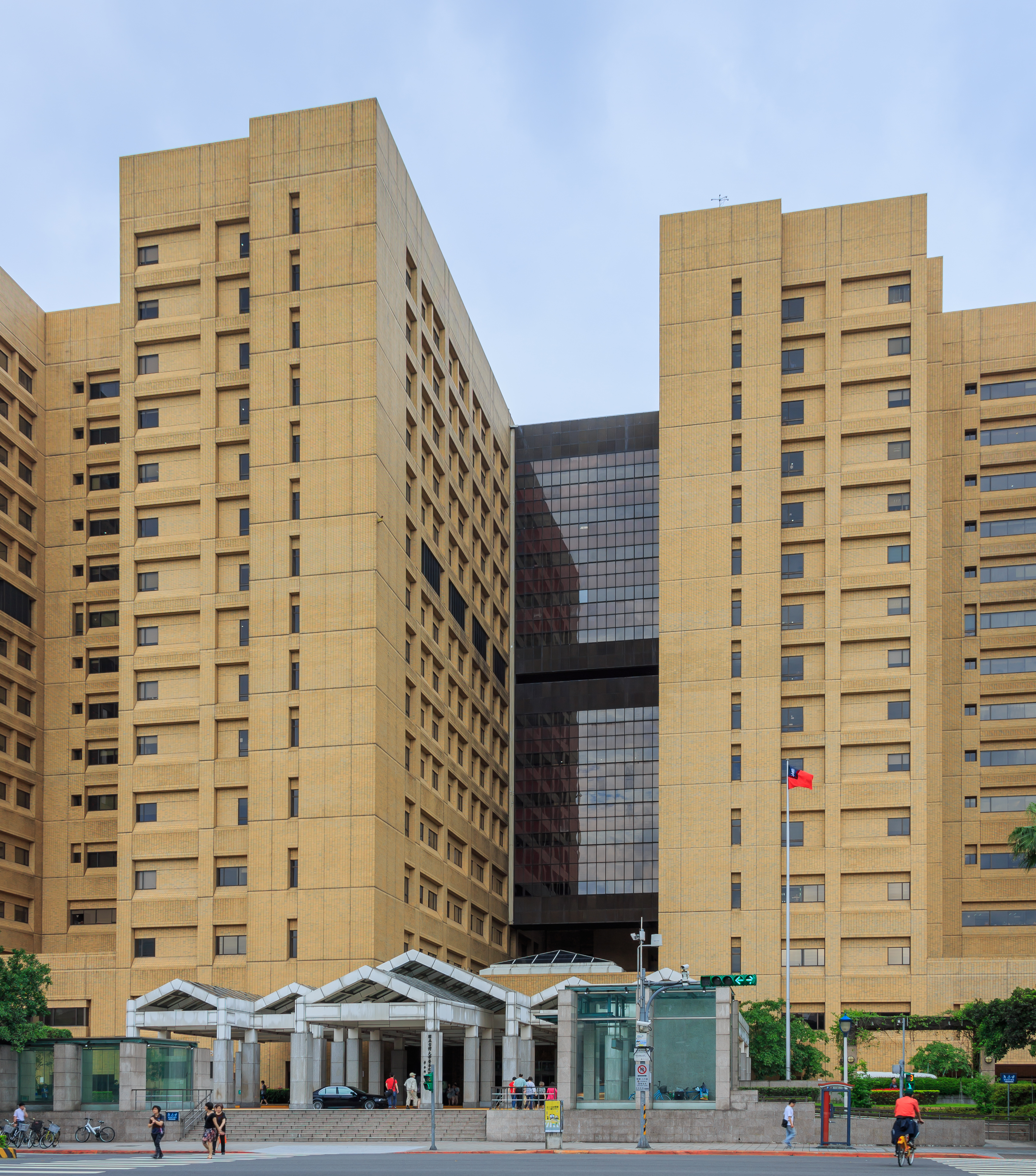
National Taiwan University Hospital in the Zhongzheng District of Taipei is the university's main teaching hospital

In addition to its main campus, NTU maintains academic, medical, agricultural, and research properties throughout Taiwan; in 2024, university land holdings totaled 34,150.50 hectares (341.5 km^{2}; 84,387.7 acres), the majority of which consisted of the Experimental Forest in central Taiwan. Within Taipei, the university has the main campus, the Shuiyuan Campus, and a downtown campus centered on its medical and public-health institutions.

The downtown campus in Zhongzheng District includes the College of Public Health on Xuzhou Road, the College of Medicine on Ren'ai Road, and National Taiwan University Hospital on Zhongshan South Road. In 2024, these properties occupied 4.75 hectares (11.7 acres), 9.81 hectares (24.2 acres), and 19.41 hectares (48.0 acres), respectively. The medical campus predates the university itself: a building completed in 1907 for the Japanese colonial-era medical school survives as the university's Museum of Medical Humanities.

The 6.78 hectares (16.8 acres) Shuiyuan Campus is located on Siyuan Street in Taipei's Zhongzheng District, immediately west of the main campus area. University facilities there include the NTU Archives and facilities associated with the university's innovation and incubation programs.

Outside Taipei, NTU operates campuses in Zhubei, Hsinchu County, and Huwei, Yunlin County. The 22.08 hectares (54.6 acres) Zhubei Campus was formally activated in 2024 as a center for technological research, entrepreneurship, and university–industry collaboration, with programs concentrating on semiconductors, quantum technology, artificial intelligence, smart healthcare, and carbon reduction. Its location places it near both the Hsinchu Science Park and Hsinchu Biomedical Park. The 57.03 hectares (140.9 acres) Yunlin Campus includes the Agricultural Incubation and Promotion Center, which was established to support advanced agricultural technology, education and training, and university–industry collaboration.

The university's largest properties are devoted to agricultural, forestry, and environmental research. Its Experimental Forest in Nantou County encompassed 32,790.83 hectares (327.9 km^{2}; 81,027.9 acres) in 2024, making it the largest component of NTU's land holdings. NTU also maintains the 1,081.16 hectares (2,671.6 acres) Highland Experimental Farm in Ren'ai Township, the 20.53 hectares (50.7 acres) Ankang Experimental Farm in Xindian, and the 5.03 hectares (12.4 acres) Wenshan Botanical Garden. Other university properties include a campus in Yilan County, which occupied 3.03 hectares (7.5 acres) in 2024, together with additional dormitory and research lands.

== Academics ==
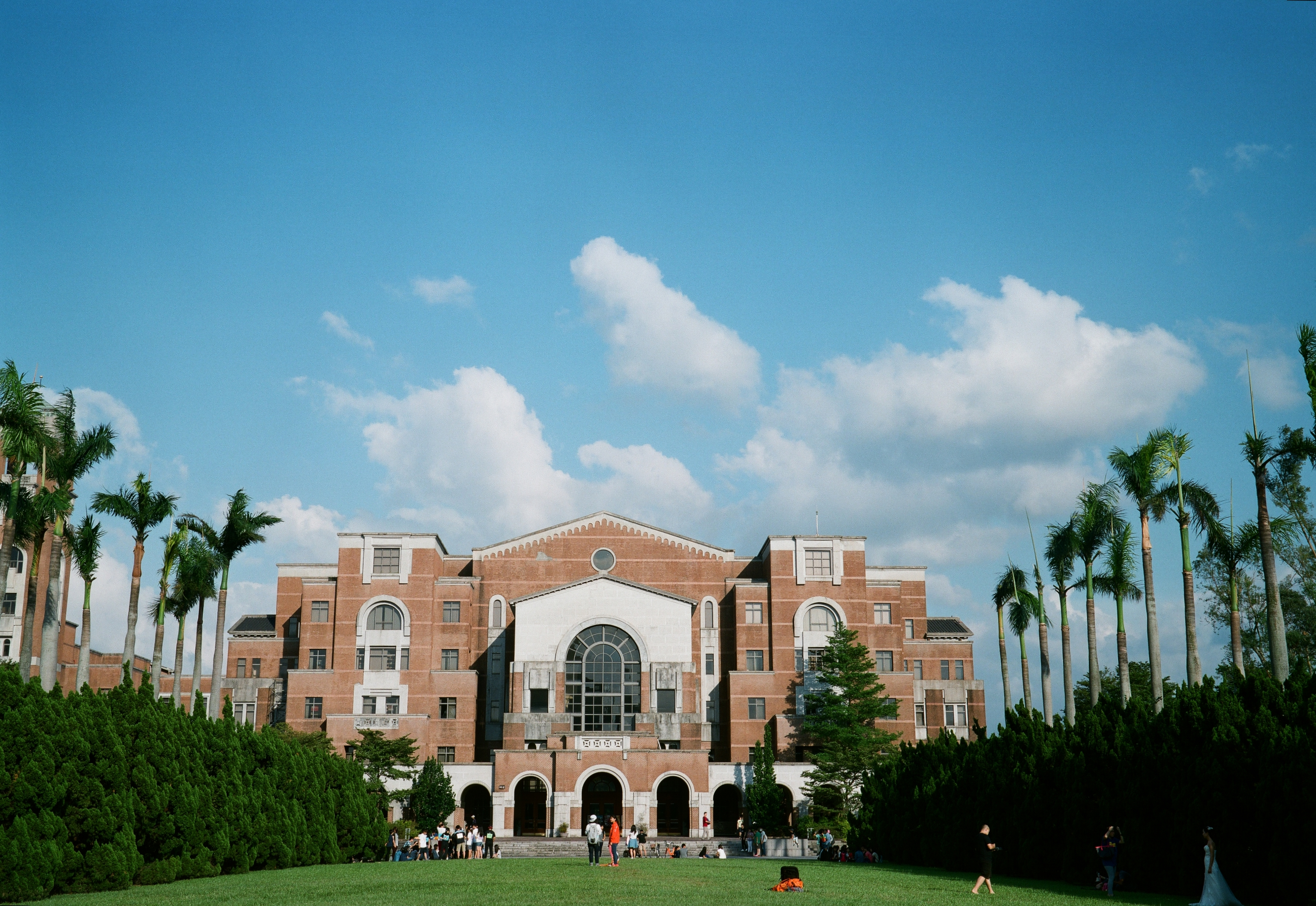
The National Taiwan University Library is the university's main library building

The university is organized into 17 college-level units: the colleges of Liberal Arts, Science, Social Sciences, Medicine, Engineering, Bio-Resources and Agriculture, Management, Public Health, Electrical Engineering and Computer Science, Law, and Life Science; the School of Political Science and Economics; the International College; the College of Design and Innovation; the Graduate School of Advanced Technology; the Center for General Education; and the School of Professional Education and Continuing Studies. Across these units, the university has 61 departments and 152 graduate institutes and offers as many as 8,000 courses each semester. The regular academic year is divided into two semesters. In 2024, NTU enrolled 34,483 students, including 17,432 undergraduates, 13,272 master's students, and 3,779 doctoral students. Most students at the university come from wealthy families with higher socioeconomic status.

=== Undergraduate education ===
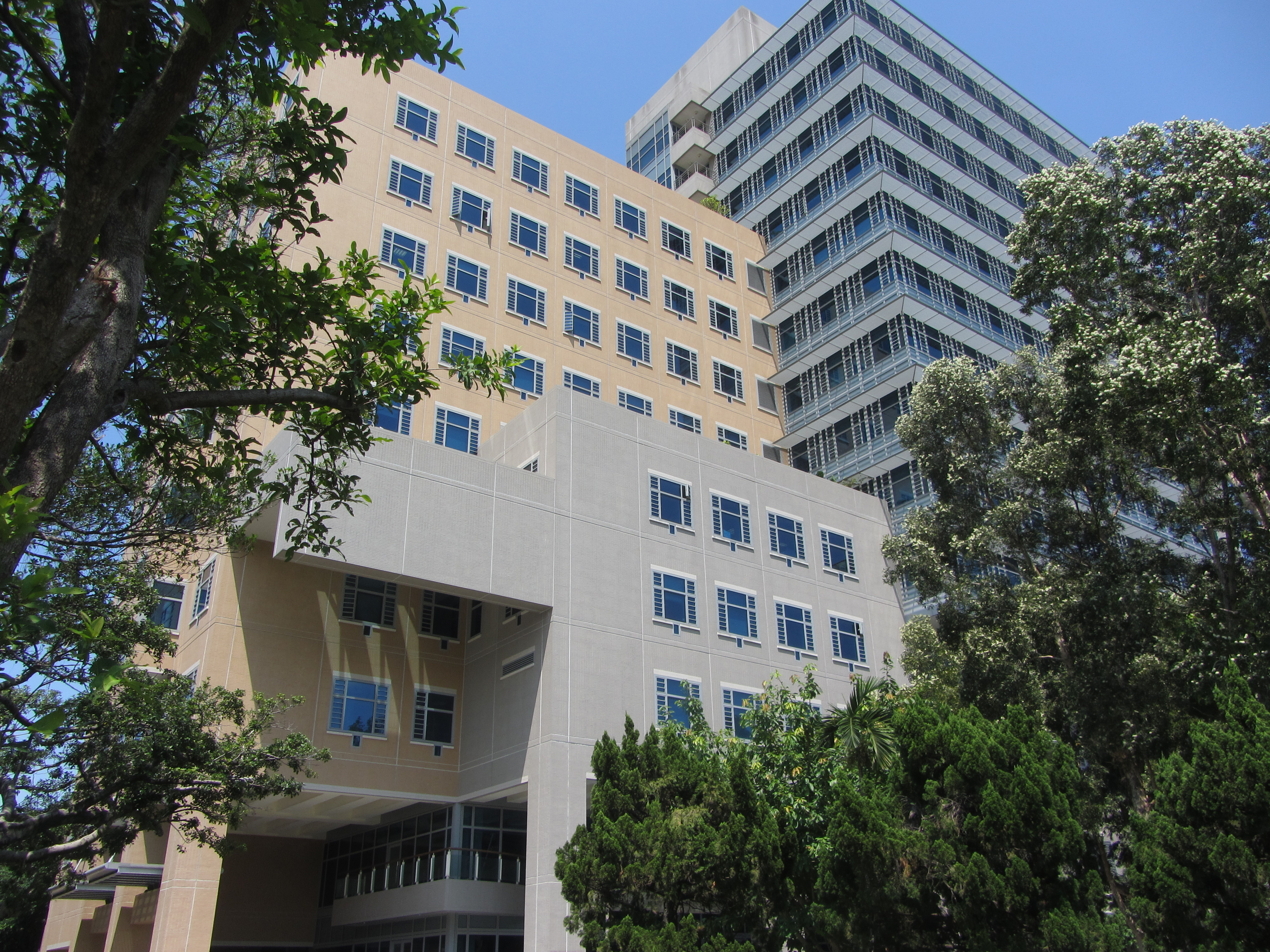
Astronomy and Mathematics Building

NTU enrolled 17,432 undergraduate students in 2024, accounting for slightly more than half of its student body. Undergraduate education is organized principally through academic departments within the university's colleges, supplemented by university-wide general education and interdisciplinary programs. The university's published general-education requirements for students admitted since 2016 call for at least three credits of Chinese literature, six credits of foreign-language study, and 15 credits of liberal-education courses.

In 2025, NTU introduced a revised curriculum known as General Education 5.0, retaining an eight-area structure while emphasizing interdisciplinary study, contemporary issues, sustainability, reflection, and collaborative learning. Its eight areas are Literature and Arts, Historical Thinking, World Civilization and Globalization, Philosophy and Moral Thinking, Citizenship and Social Analysis, Mathematics and Computer Science, Physical Science, and Life Science. The 2025 revision renamed the former World Civilization area to World Civilization and Globalization and replaced Mathematics, Digital Competence, and Quantitative Analysis with Mathematics and Computer Science.

NTU has also established academic units specifically for interdisciplinary undergraduate study. The College of Design and Innovation, established in 2015 and commonly called the D-School, administers a trans-disciplinary bachelor's degree as well as programs in leadership and creativity and entrepreneurship. The International College, established in 2021, offers the Global Undergraduate Program in Semiconductors alongside interdisciplinary graduate programs in agriculture and genomics, biodiversity, smart medicine and health informatics, and disaster-risk reduction and resilience.

=== Graduate and professional education ===
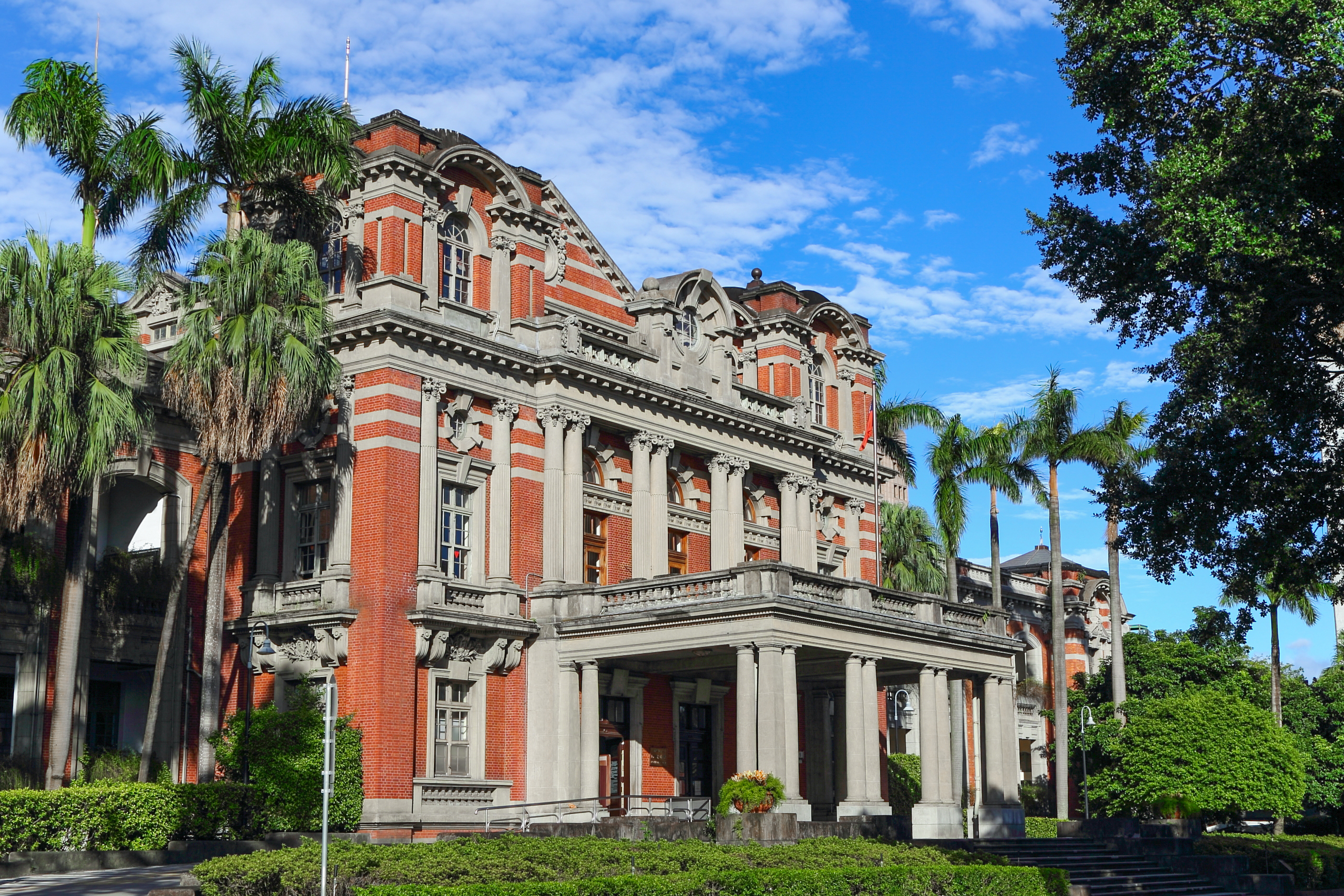
The original NTU hospital building, built in 1895, was the largest in Southeast Asia.

Graduate students constitute a large proportion of the university: in 2024, NTU enrolled 13,272 master's students and 3,779 doctoral students, compared with 17,432 undergraduates. The university reported 152 graduate institutes, including 32 integrated master's and doctoral programs, and three professional schools in dentistry, pharmacy, and veterinary medicine. The schools of Dentistry and Pharmacy are administered through the College of Medicine, while the School of Veterinary Medicine is part of the College of Bio-Resources and Agriculture.

Several newer academic units concentrate on interdisciplinary or professional graduate education. The Graduate School of Advanced Technology, established in 2021, offers programs in integrated-circuit design and automation, semiconductor devices and materials, nanoengineering and nanoscience, and precision health and intelligent medicine. The School of Political Science and Economics, established in 2024, offers master's programs in political economy and finance and a professional master's program in leadership and management. The School of Professional Education and Continuing Studies, founded in 1987, administers professional master's programs in business administration, business law, and biotechnology management in addition to continuing-education and professional-training programs.

NTU also participates in several graduate programs conducted in cooperation with Academia Sinica, including Taiwan International Graduate Program tracks in Earth System Science, Sustainable Chemical Science and Technology, and Interdisciplinary Neuroscience. Other interdisciplinary graduate programs span fields such as climate change and sustainable development, translational medicine, molecular science and technology, genomic and systems biology, and plant biotechnology.

=== Research ===
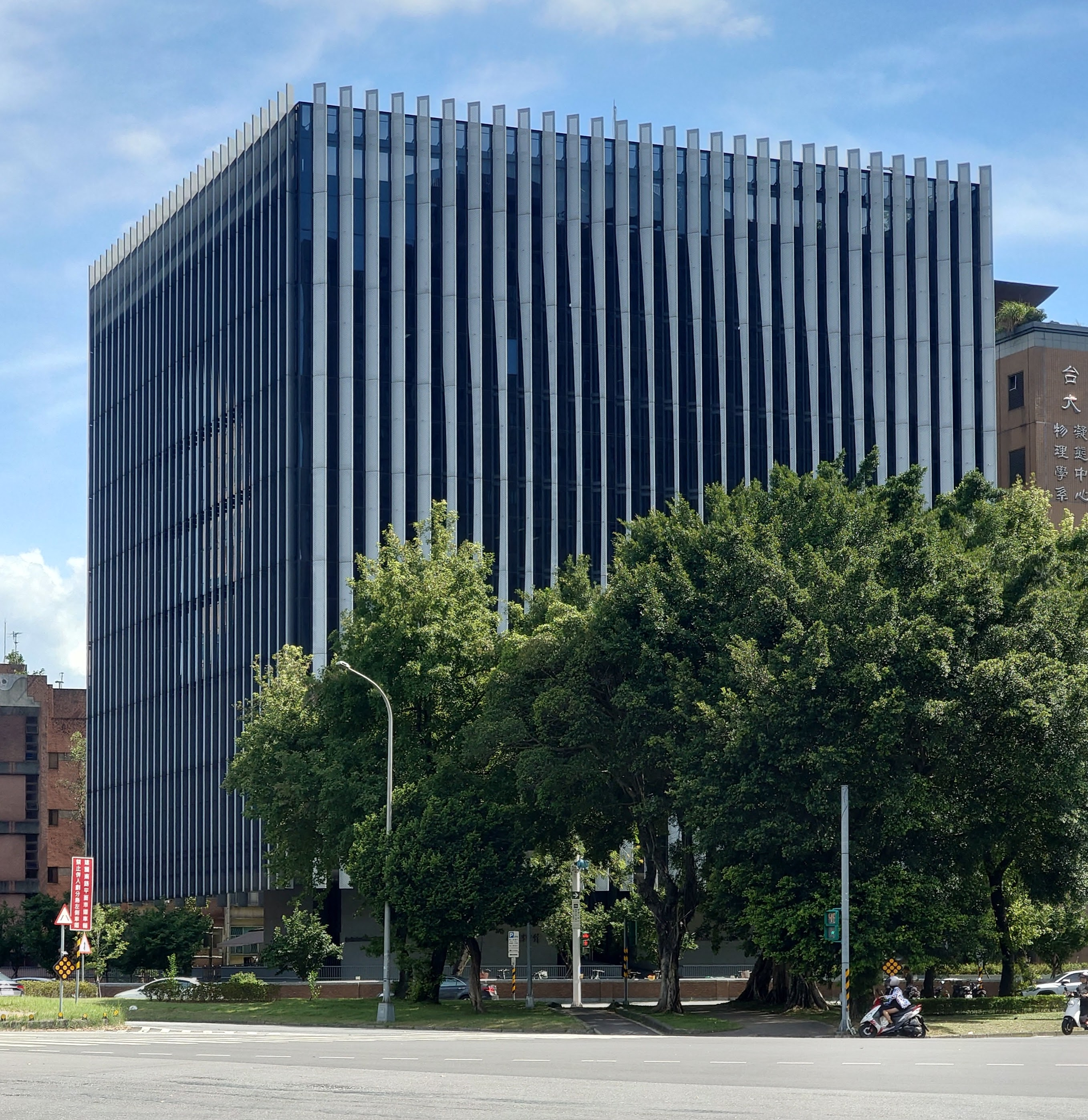
Chee-Chun Leung Hall, completed in 2017, was designed by architect Kris Yao and houses one of the university's particle astrophysics research centers.

Research at NTU is conducted through departments and graduate institutes as well as a network of university-level, national-level, and international research centers. National-level facilities based at or associated with the university include the National Center for Research on Earthquake Engineering, the Research Institute for the Humanities and Social Sciences of the National Science and Technology Council, the National Center for Theoretical Sciences, and research centers for artificial intelligence and health care, sustainability, and infectious diseases. University-level centers conduct research in areas including condensed-matter physics, biotechnology, biodiversity, genomics and precision medicine, digital humanities, quantum science, econometrics, developmental biology, oceanography, artificial intelligence and robotics, financial technology, and the humanities and social sciences.

The university also maintains research collaborations with major technology companies; university-level facilities include the TSMC–NTU Joint Research Center, the MediaTek–NTU Research Center, and the NVIDIA–NTU Artificial Intelligence Joint Research Center. In September 2025, NTU, the Max Planck Society, and the Institute for Advanced Study formally inaugurated the Max Planck–IAS–NTU Center for Particle Physics, Cosmology and Geometry, an international research center on campus combining work in mathematics, particle physics, and cosmology.

The university's teaching and research infrastructure extends beyond its departments and laboratories: the College of Medicine is affiliated with National Taiwan University Hospital, while the College of Bio-Resources and Agriculture operates facilities including a veterinary hospital, experimental farm, phytotron, and the Xitou and Highland experimental farms and forests.

=== Associated academic institutions and resources ===
The university is a member of the National Taiwan University System with National Taiwan Normal University and the National Taiwan University of Science and Technology. Under the system's academic regulations, undergraduate students may apply to pursue an intercollegiate double major or minor at one of the other member universities, allowing study in departments not offered by their home institution. The university is also a member of the Association of Pacific Rim Universities, the Association of East Asian Research Universities, the Association of Southeast Asian Institutions of Higher Learning, the Association to Advance Collegiate Schools of Business, and the European Union Centre in Taiwan. It has partnerships with several American universities, including Washington University in St. Louis, which, since 2012, has funded NTU students to complete doctoral degrees at the university. In 2024, NTU and the University of Texas at Arlington began a partnership to host a dual master's degree program in architecture between the two universities.

The university's International Chinese Language Program (ICLP) was established in 1962 for students from Stanford University and subsequently expanded into the Inter-University Program for Chinese Language Studies. NTU assumed full administration of the program in 1997, when it adopted its present name, and the institute provides intensive instruction in modern and classical Chinese to international students.

The National Taiwan University Library system holds more than 2.4 million volumes, about 24,000 periodicals, and more than 50,000 rare books. Its special collections include the Tan-Hsin judicial archives, Ming-dynasty stitched-binding books, the Rekidai Hōan diplomatic archive of the Ryukyu Kingdom, European incunabula, and materials relating to Taiwanese history, Southeast Asia, and Taiwan under Japanese rule.

National Taiwan University Press was established in 1996 as the university's academic publishing house. It publishes scholarly monographs, textbooks, and general-interest works and subjects its academic books to independent anonymous peer review.

== Student life ==
=== Student organizations ===
National Taiwan University has more than 400 student clubs and organizations. The university classifies its student clubs into eight categories: physical training, service, social development, entertainment, academic, arts, autonomy, and composite organizations. Student organizations representing international communities include associations for Japanese, Korean, Indonesian, Vietnamese, Indian, Malaysian, African, Filipino, Thai, and European students. The university maintains two student activity centers that provide offices and other facilities for student organizations.

=== Student housing ===
The Guo-Ching Building, which provides student accommodation

The university provides student accommodation through university-operated residence halls and privately managed residential facilities developed in cooperation with the university. According to the Office of International Affairs, the university's general dormitory system comprises 21 residence halls accommodating more than 8,600 students, with most of these buildings designated for undergraduates. General dormitory rooms typically accommodate two or four students, with room assignments administered by the Student Housing Service Division.

The university also offers accommodation through Prince House, which comprises the Chang-Hsing and Shui-Yuan dormitories near the main campus. Operated by Prince Corporation in cooperation with NTU, these residences offer single and double rooms with private bathrooms and other amenities. The Guo Qing Dormitory, also known as the International Youth Center, provides double-room accommodation for graduate students.

=== Athletics and recreation ===
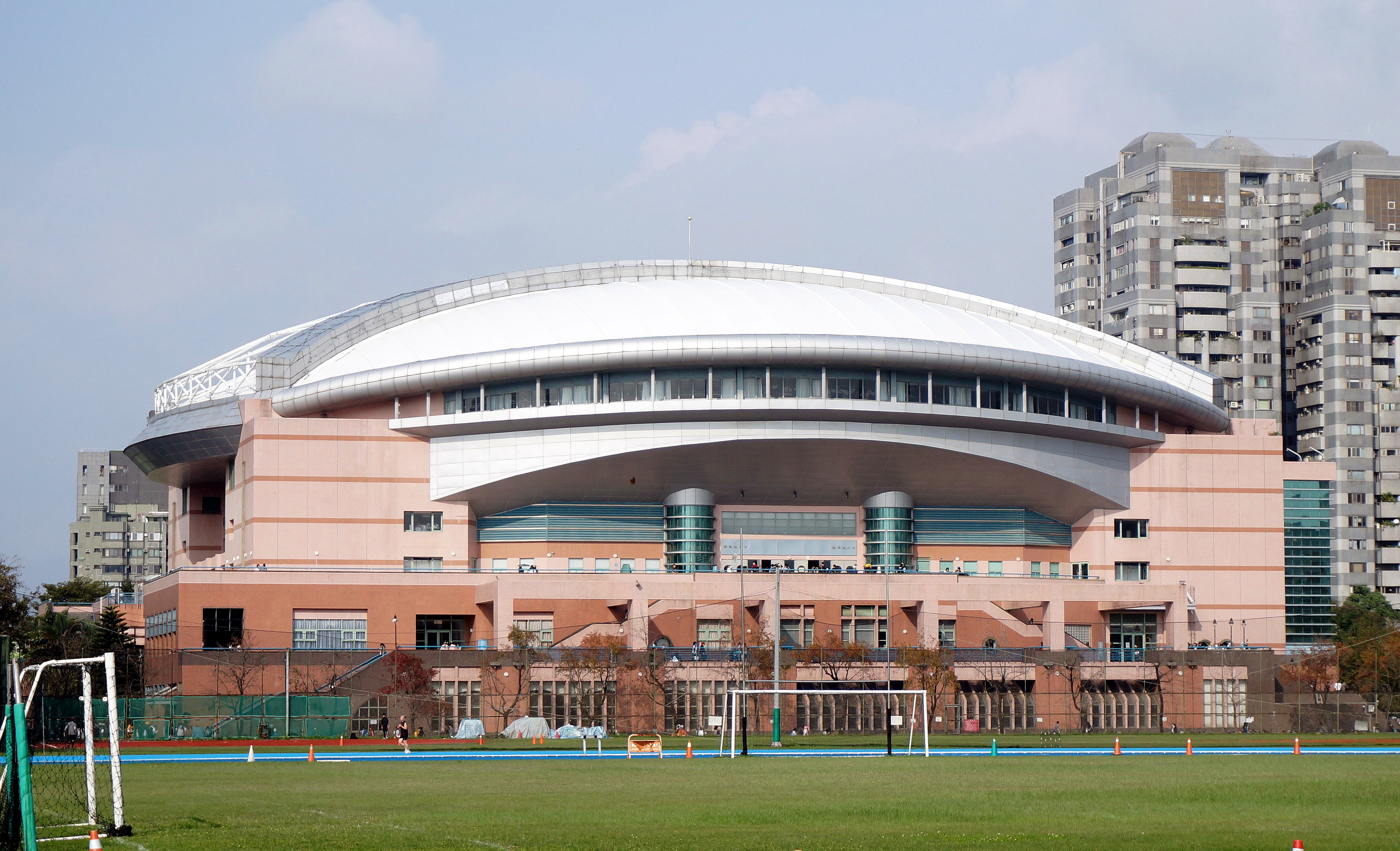
The NTU Sports Center and adjacent athletic grounds

The university maintains indoor and outdoor sports facilities, including the NTU Sports Center, gymnasiums, swimming pools, basketball and volleyball courts, tennis courts, and athletic fields. The NTU Sports Center contains an indoor swimming pool, squash courts, rooms for martial arts and gymnastics, and multipurpose courts used for basketball, volleyball, badminton, and handball. Outdoor recreational facilities include a 400-meter running track, baseball and softball facilities, football and rugby fields, and tennis courts.

The university's Athletic Department organizes annual sporting events, including a swimming competition in October, the NTU Athletic Games in November, and the NTU Campus Marathon in March.

== Rankings and reputation ==
University rankings

Global – Overall
- ARWU World: 201–300 (2024)
- CWUR World: 104 (2024)
- CWTS World: 100 (2023)
- QS World: 63 (2026)
- THE World: 140 (2026)
- THE Reputation: 126-150 (2023)
- USNWR Global: 233 (2024–2025)

Regional – Overall
- QS Asia: 21 (2024)
- THE Asia: 26 (2024)
- USNWR Asia: 48 (2024–2025)

National Taiwan University (NTU) was ranked 54th worldwide in the 2027 QS World University Rankings, its highest position in the ranking's history and an improvement from 63rd in 2026. In the 2027 Times Higher Education World University Rankings, NTU was ranked joint 126th worldwide. The 2026 Academic Ranking of World Universities, published by ShanghaiRanking Consultancy, placed NTU in the 201–300 range globally.

The Center for World University Rankings ranked NTU 115th worldwide and first in Taiwan in its 2026 edition, which evaluated 21,291 institutions. In the 2026 Performance Ranking of Scientific Papers for World Universities, published by NTU itself, the university was ranked 144th globally and first in Taiwan.

=== Regional and national rankings ===
In the 2026 QS Asia University Rankings, NTU ranked 23rd in Asia, advancing three places from the preceding year and remaining Taiwan's highest-ranked university in the assessment. The 2026 Times Higher Education Asia University Rankings placed NTU joint 26th in Asia, alongside Korea University.

Domestically, NTU ranked first overall in the 2026 Taiwan's Best Universities Rankings published by Global Views Monthly, ahead of National Cheng Kung University and National Yang Ming Chiao Tung University. The assessment evaluated universities using indicators covering social reputation, academic achievement, teaching resources, internationalization, university–industry collaboration, and financial strength.

=== Subject rankings ===
In the 2026 QS World University Rankings by Subject, NTU placed within the world's top 100 universities across all five broad subject areas, with seven individual subjects ranked among the global top 50. Its highest individual placement was sixth worldwide in classics and ancient history, while history ranked 33rd. Within engineering, NTU ranked 63rd in the broad engineering and technology category, 49th in civil and structural engineering, 65th in chemical engineering, and 87th in both mechanical engineering and materials science.

In the 2026 Times Higher Education subject rankings, NTU placed joint 78th worldwide in medical and health, joint 88th in engineering, and within the 101–125 range in business and economics. In ShanghaiRanking's 2026 Global Ranking of Academic Subjects, NTU ranked 32nd in biomedical engineering and 49th in nursing, while atmospheric science, dentistry and oral sciences, and business administration were each placed within the 51–75 range.

=== Academic reputation and sustainability ===
NTU was placed in the 101–150 range of the 2025 Times Higher Education World Reputation Rankings, making it the only Taiwanese institution included in that edition. In the 2026 Times Higher Education Sustainability Impact Ratings, which assess universities' contributions to the Sustainable Development Goals, NTU ranked joint tenth worldwide.

QS Subject Ranking 2023
Subject	Global	National
Arts & Humanities	▲105	1
Linguistics	▼58	1
Art and Design	▲101–150	▼2
Classics and Ancient History	▲22	1
English Language and Literature	▼77	1
History	51–100	1
Modern Languages	▼53	1
Performing Arts	101–120	1
Philosophy	▲151–200	1
Engineering and Technology	▼76	1
Engineering – Chemical	▼82	▼2
Engineering – Civil and Structural	▼51–100	1
Computer Science and Information Systems	▼80	1
Engineering – Electrical and Electronic	▼64	1
Engineering – Mechanical	▼91	1
Life Sciences & Medicine	▼85	1
Agriculture and Forestry	▼88	1
Anatomy and Physiology	▼51–100	1
Biological Sciences	▲103	1
Medicine	▼68	1
Nursing	▼51–100	▼2–3
Pharmacy and Pharmacology	▼92	1
Psychology	▲101–150	1
Natural Sciences	▼81	1
Chemistry	▼77	1
Earth and Marine Sciences	51–100	1
Environmental Sciences	▼86	1
Geography	51–100	1
Geology	▲101–150	1
Geophysics	101–150	1
Materials Sciences	▼93	1
Mathematics	▲109	1
Physics and Astronomy	▼83	1
Social Sciences & Management	▼75	1
Accounting and Finance	▼71	1
Anthropology	▼51–100	1
Business and Management Studies	▲107	1
Communication and Media Studies	▲101–150	1
Economics and Econometrics	▼119	1
Education and Training	▲101–150	2–3
Law and Legal Studies	▼69	1
Library and Information Management	51–70	1
Politics	▲101–150	1–2
Social Policy and Administration	▲46	1
Sociology	▼55	1
Sports–Related Subjects	51–100	1–2

THE Subject Ranking 2023
Subject	Global	National
Arts & humanities	▼176–200	1
Business & economics	▼84	1
Social sciences	176–200	1
Computer science	▲101–125	1
Engineering	▼98	1
Clinical & health	▼ =75	1
Life sciences	▼176–200	1
Physical sciences	▼301–400	1
Psychology	▼151–175	1

ARWU Subject Ranking 2022
Subject	Global	National
Natural Sciences
Mathematics	▼401–500	▼4
Physics	151–200	1–2
Chemistry	▼151–200	1
Earth Sciences	151–200	1
Geography	▼201–300	1
Ecology	201–300	1
Oceanography	▼151–200	1–2
Atmospheric Science	201–300	1
Engineering
Electrical & Electronic Engineering	▼201–300	1–2
Telecommunication Engineering	▼201–300	▼3
Instruments Science & Technology	▲101–150	1
Biomedical Engineering	76–100	1
Computer Science & Engineering	▼301–400	▼2–3
Civil Engineering	76–100	1
Chemical Engineering	▲101–150	1
Materials Science & Engineering	101–150	1–2
Nanoscience & Nanotechnology	76–100	1
Energy Science & Engineering	▲101–150	1
Environmental Science & Engineering	201–300	1
Water Resources	▲101–150	1
Food Science & Technology	▲201–300	2
Biotechnology	101–150	1
Transportation Science & Technology	▲101–150	1
Metallurgical Engineering	▼151–200	▼2
Life Sciences
Biological Sciences	▲201–300	1
Human Biological Sciences	301–400	1
Agricultural Sciences	101–150	1
Veterinary Sciences	151–200	2–3
Medical Sciences
Clinical Medicine	151–200	1
Public Health	▲101–150	1
Dentistry & Oral Sciences	76–100	1
Nursing	▼39	▼2
Medical Technology	201–300	1–3
Pharmacy & Pharmaceutical Sciences	▲101–150	1
Social Sciences
Economics	301–400	1
Political Sciences	301–400	1
Education	401–500	9–11
Psychology	▼401–500	1
Business Administration	▼301–400	1
Management	201–300	1
Hospitality & Tourism Management	201–300	8

== List of presidents ==
Seal of National Taiwan University

The president heads the university. Each college is headed by a dean and each department by a chairman. Students elect their own representatives each year to attend administrative meetings.

=== National Taiwan University ===
- Chen Wen-chang: 8 January 2023 – present
- Kuan Chung-ming: 8 January 2019 – 7 January 2023
- Tei-Wei Kuo (interim): October 2017 – January 2019
- Yang Pan-chyr: June 2013 – June 2017
- Lee Si-chen: August 2005 – June 2013
- Chen Wei-jao: 22 June 1993 – June 2005
- Kuo Kuang-hsiung: March 1993 – June 1993
- Sun Chen: August 1984 – February 1993
- Yu Chao-chung: August 1981 – July 1984
- Yen Cheng-hsing: June 1970 – July 1981
- Chien Szu-liang: January 1951 – May 1970
- Shen Kang-po: December 1950 – January 1951
- Fu Szu-nien: January 1949 – December 1950
- Chuang Chang-kung: June 1948 – December 1948
- Lu Chih-houng: August 1946 – May 1948
- Lo Tsung-lo: August 1945 – July 1946

=== Taihoku Imperial University ===
- Kazuo Ando (安藤一雄): March 1945 – August 1945
- Masatsugu Ando: April 1941 – March 1945
- Sadanori Mita: September 1937 – April 1941
- Taira Shidehara: March 1928 – September 1937

== Notable alumni ==
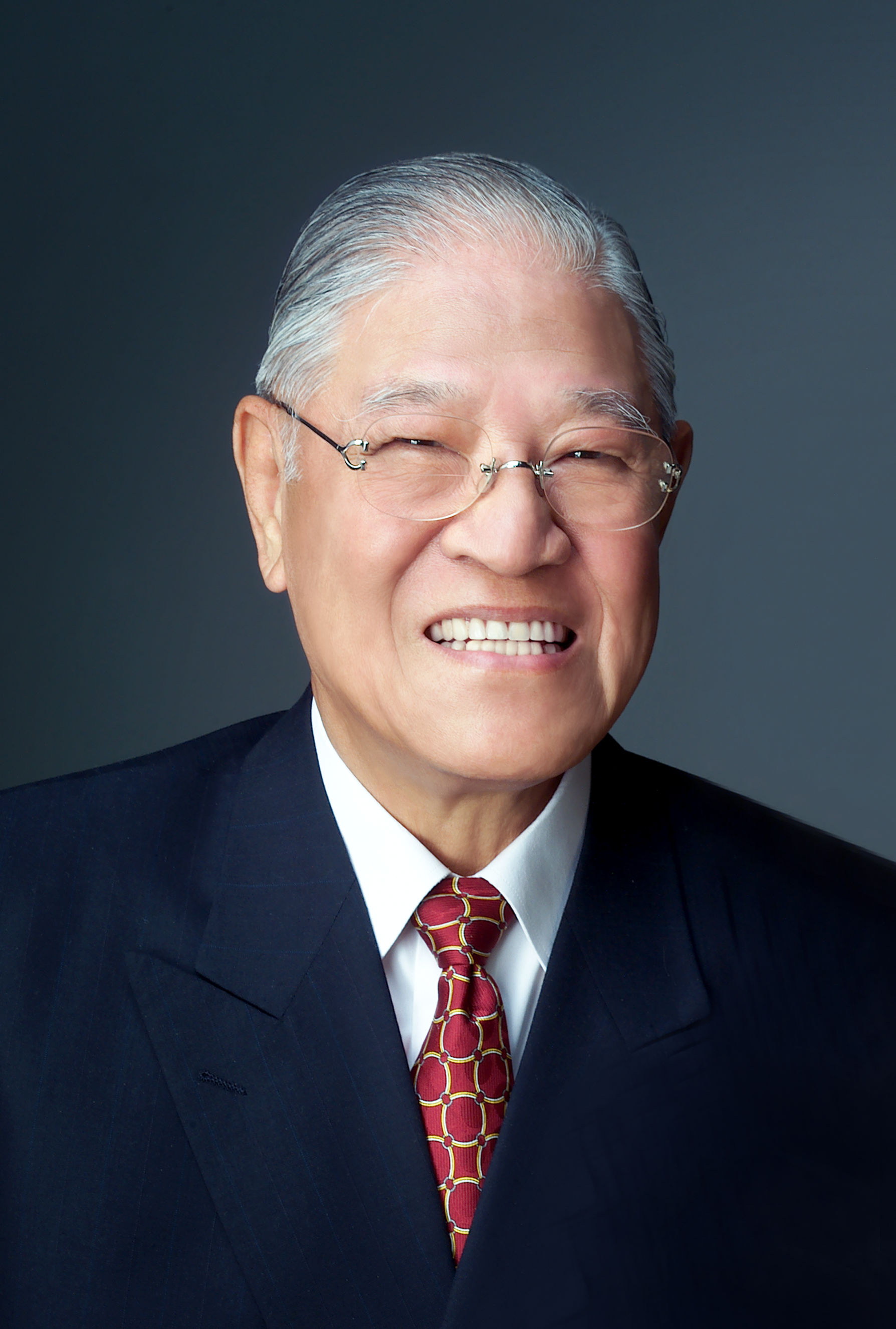
Lee Teng-hui,
4th President of the Republic of China (BS, 1949)

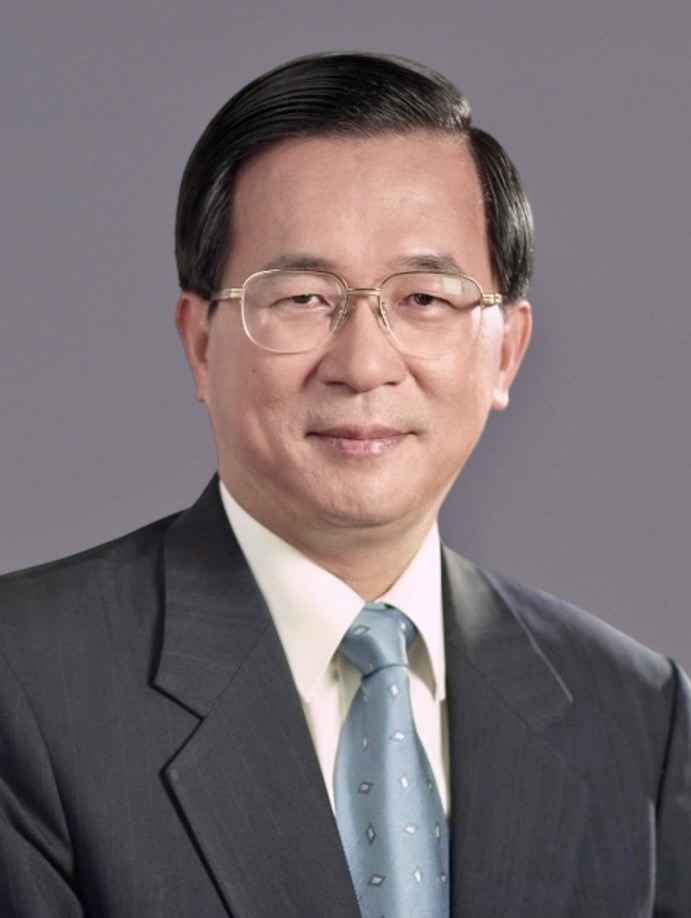
Chen Shui-bian,
5th President of the Republic of China (LLB, 1974)

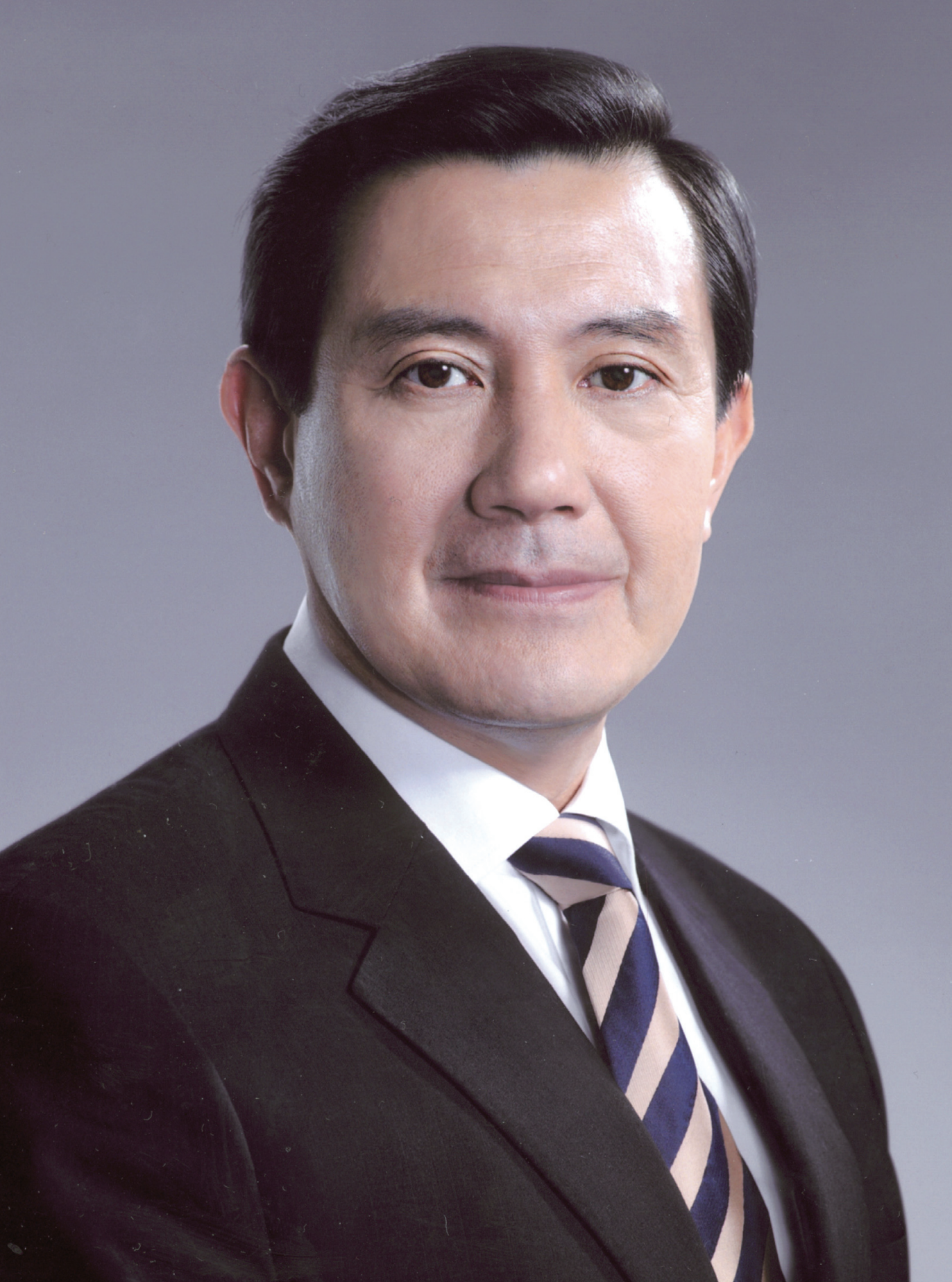
Ma Ying-jeou,
6th President of the Republic of China (LLB, 1972)

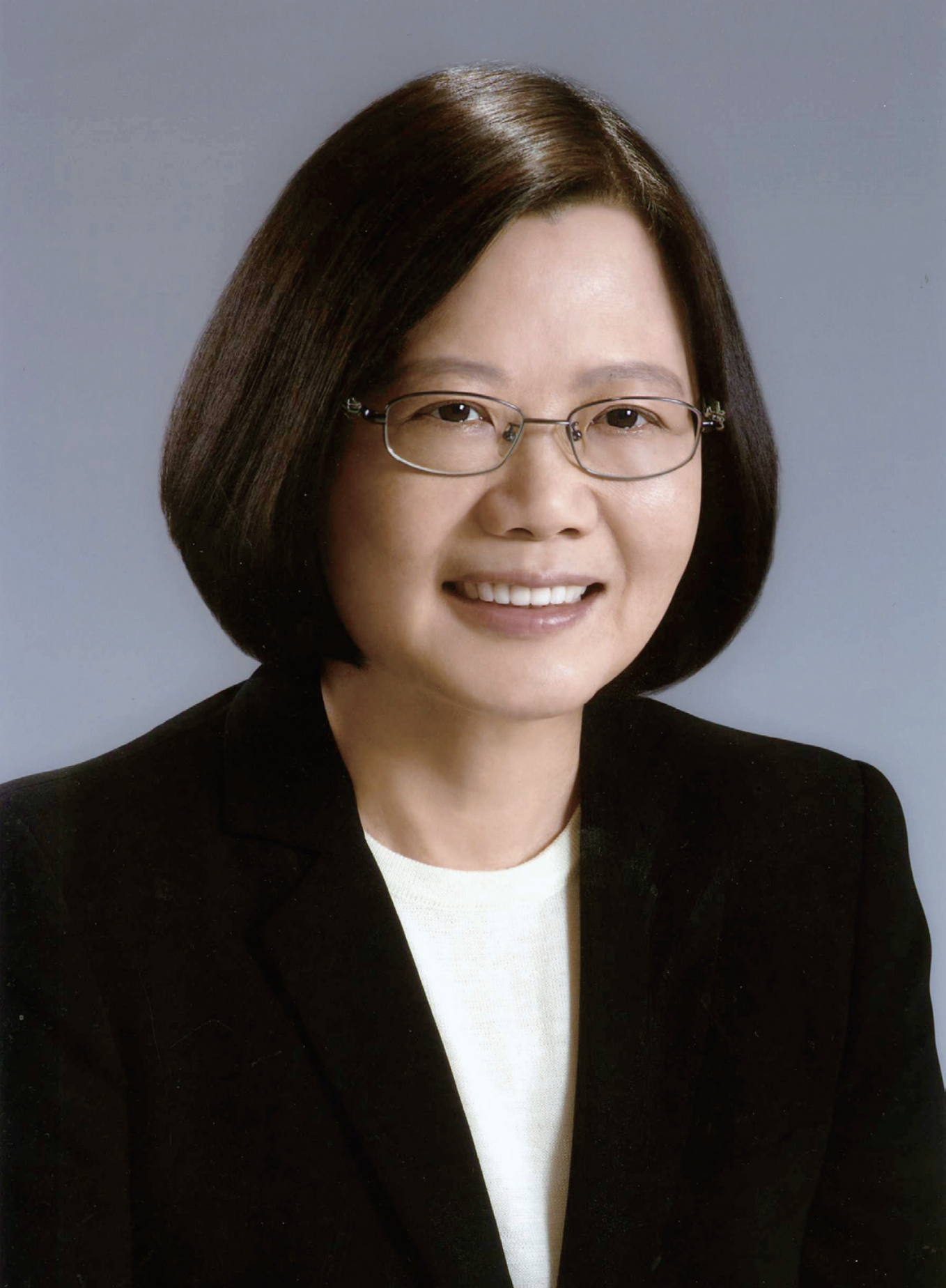
Tsai Ing-wen,
7th President of the Republic of China (LLB, 1978)

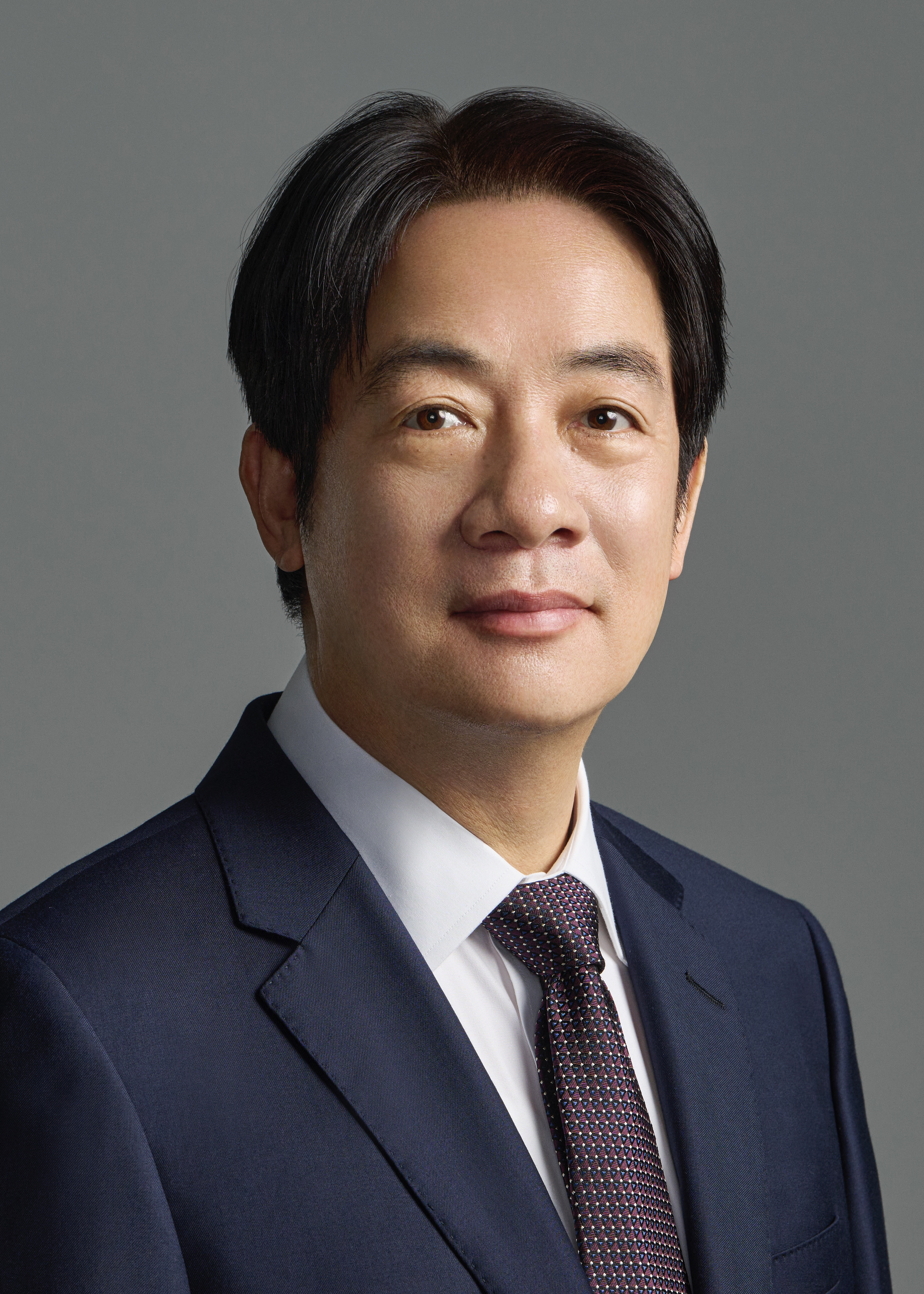
Lai Ching-te,
8th President of the Republic of China (BS, 1984)
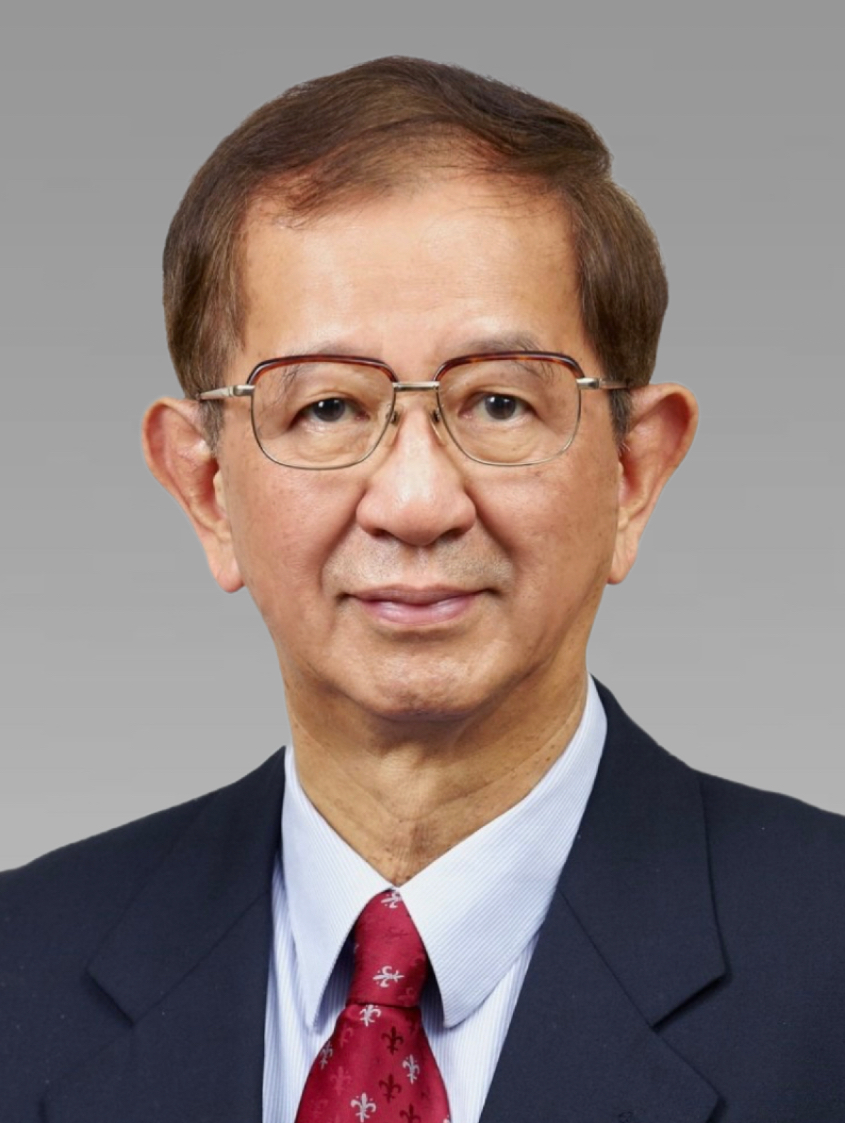
Yuan T. Lee,
1986 Nobel Prize in Chemistry
(BS, 1959)

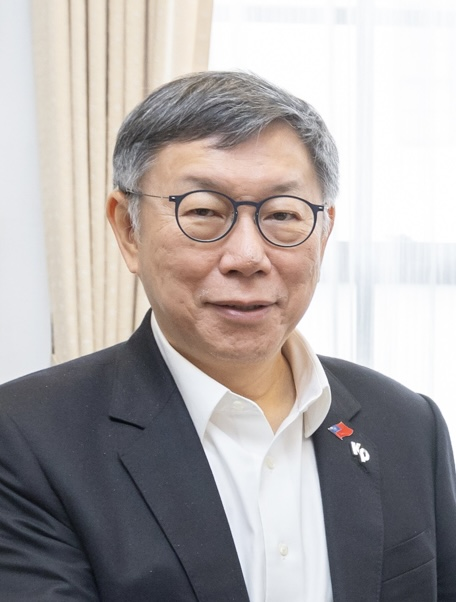
Ko Wen-je,
13th Mayor of Taipei
(MB, 1986; PhD, 2002)

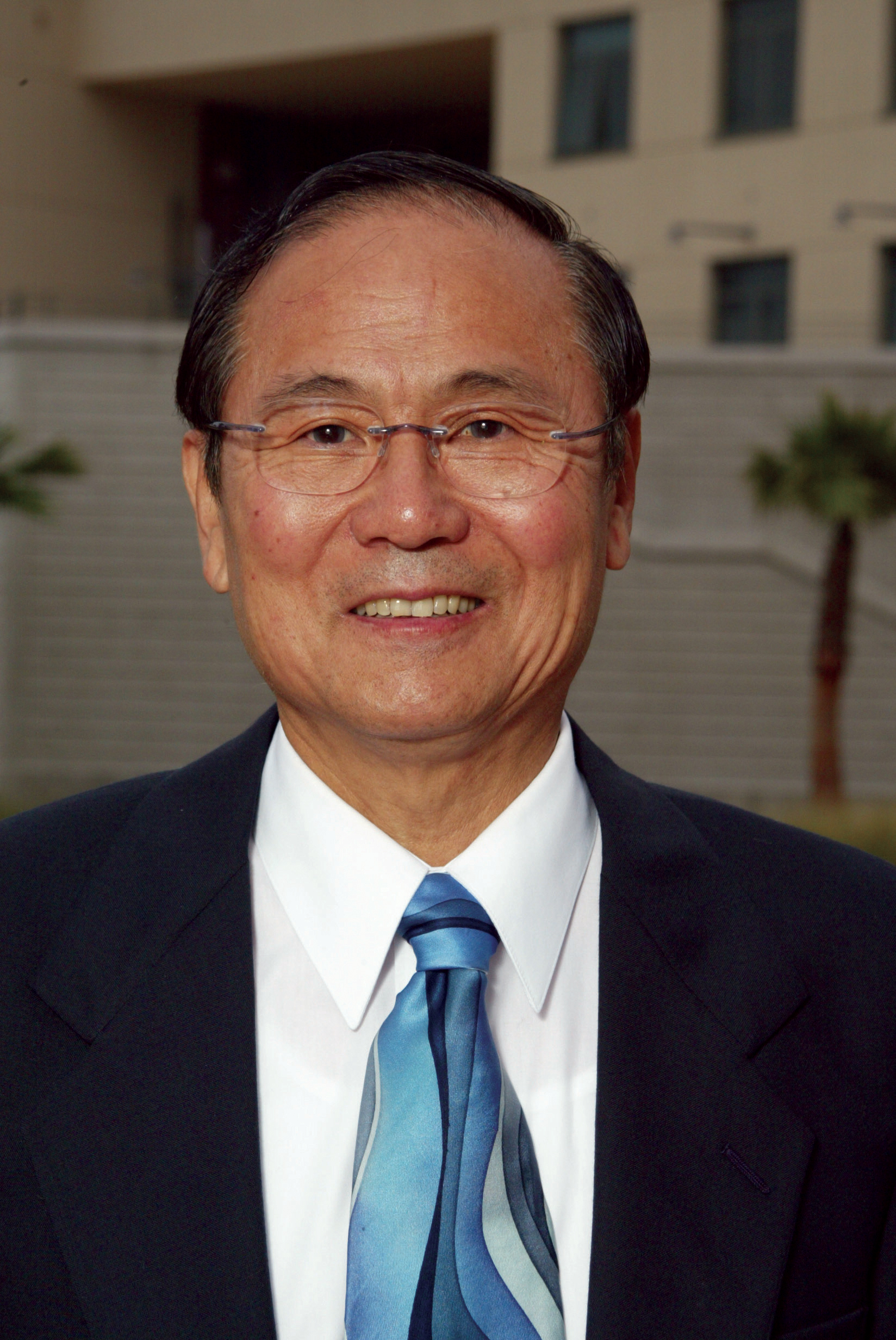
Henry T. Yang,
Chancellor of UC Santa Barbara
(BS, 1962)

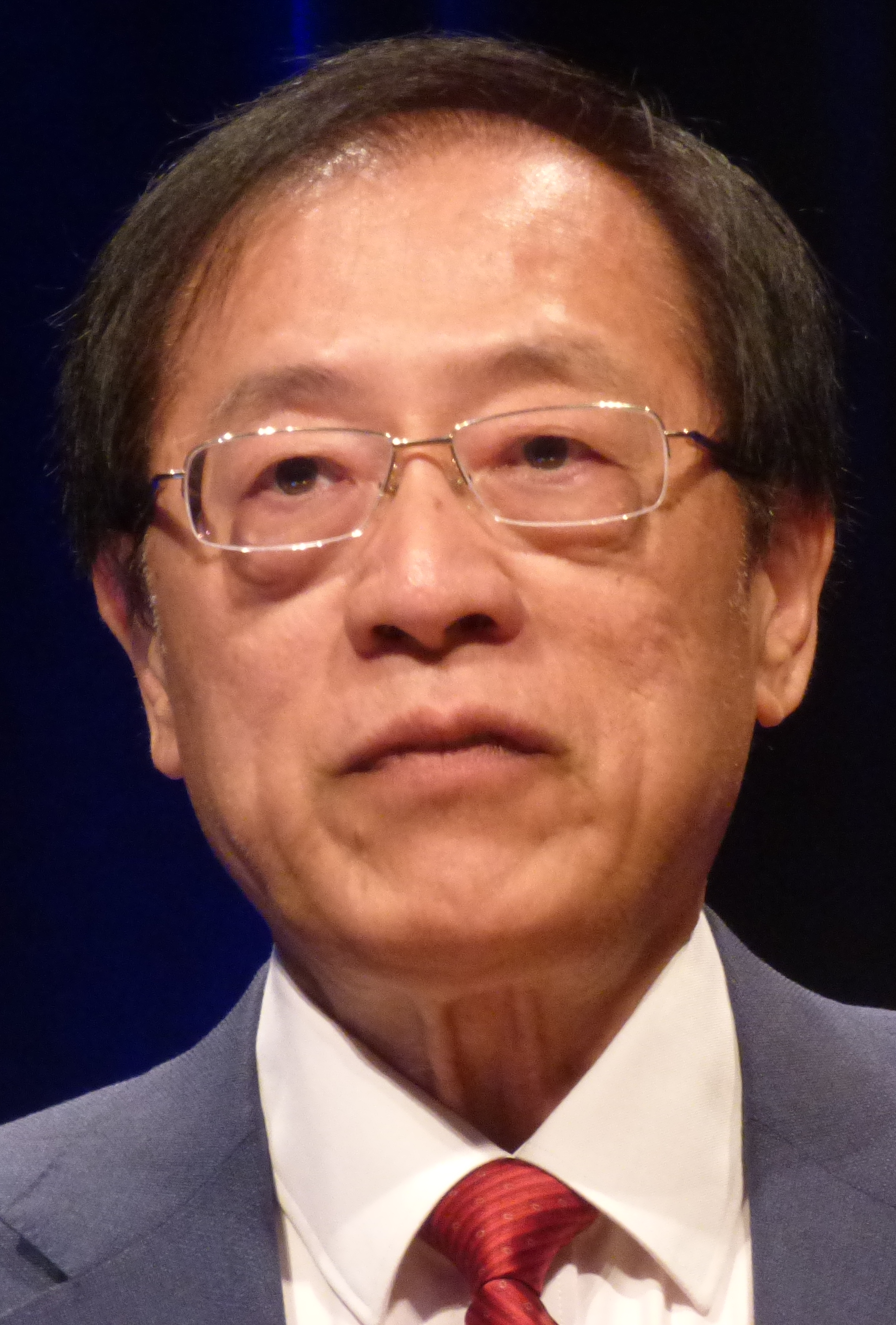
Andrew Yao,
Turing Award laureate
(BS, 1967)

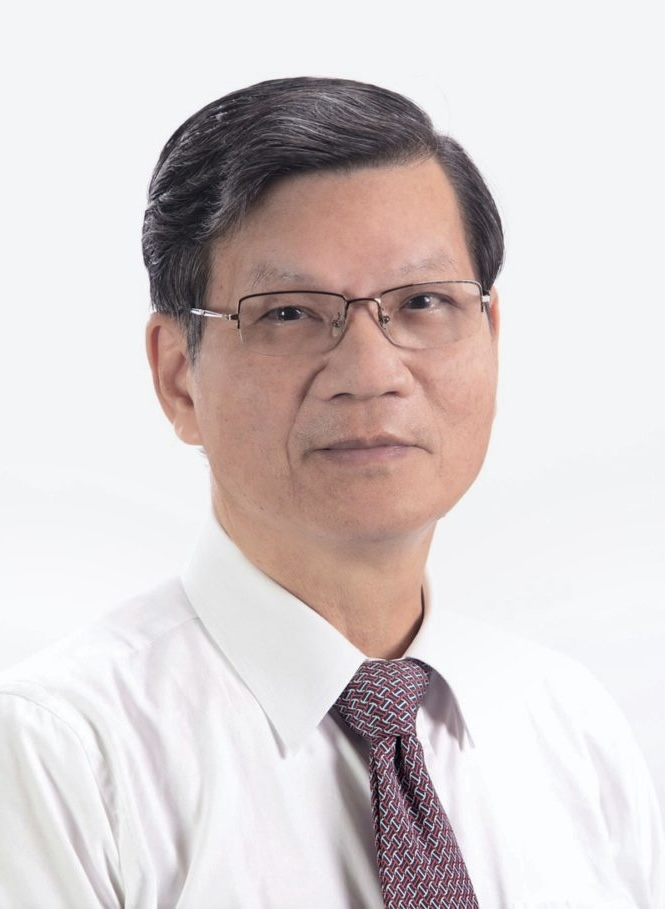
Chi-Huey Wong,
President of Academia Sinica
(BS, 1970; MS, 1977)

National Taiwan University has produced notable alumni in politics, business, academia, science, medicine, and numerous other fields. Graduates of the university disproportionately comprise a majority of the political and business elite in Taiwan. As of 2024, about half (48.7%) of all academicians of Academia Sinica are NTU graduates and 70 percent of all Taiwanese members of the U.S. National Academy of Sciences (NAS) are. 25 graduates of NTU are members of the U.S. National Academy of Sciences.

Five of the eight presidents of the Republic of China are graduates of the university: Lai Ching-te, the current president of Taiwan; Tsai Ing-Wen, the first woman to be elected to the position; Ma Ying-jeou; Chen Shui-bian, the first member of the Democratic Progressive Party (DPP) to hold the office; and Lee Teng-hui, the first native-born Taiwanese to become president. In addition, six out of the 13 vice-presidents of the Republic of China have graduated from NTU, including Lee Teng-hui, Lien Chan, Annette Lu, Wu Den-yih, Chen Chien-jen, and Lai Ching-te. The heads of major political parties—such as Eric Chu and Cheng Li-wun, chairs of the Kuomintang; Ko Wen-je, former mayor of Taipei and founder of the Taiwan People's Party (TPP); and Huang Kuo-chang, chairman of the TPP—also graduated from NTU.

In science, graduates include Yuan T. Lee, who received the 1986 Nobel Prize in Chemistry for the development of reaction dynamics, and Andrew Yao, who was awarded the Turing Award in 2000 for his contributions to cryptography and computation. Other scientific achievements by alumni include contributions to chemical synthesis by chemist Chi-Huey Wong, winner of the 2014 Wolf Prize in Chemistry, and contributions to biosynthesis by botanist Shang Fa Yang, winner of the 1991 Wolf Prize in Agriculture. Alumnus Chenming Hu was awarded the IEEE Medal of Honor in 2020; Simon Sze the J. J. Ebers Award in 1991; and George Kuo the 1994 William Beaumont Prize for the discovery of the Hepatitis C virus. Notable mathematicians who graduated from NTU include Fan Chung, the Paul Erdős Professor in Combinatorics at the University of California, San Diego; Wu-Chung Hsiang, topologist and professor at Princeton University; and Horng-Tzer Yau, Merton Professor of Mathematics at Harvard University.

In academia, alumni include two chancellors of American universities: Chang-Lin Tien, chancellor of the University of California, Berkeley, and Henry T. Yang, chancellor of the University of California, Santa Barbara. Other academic administrators include Ambrose King, vice-chancellor of the Chinese University of Hong Kong, and Vincent Chang, vice-chancellor of BRAC University. Academicians of Academia Sinica include political scientist Chu Yun-han; economists Hu Sheng-cheng, Cyrus Chu, Cheng Hsiao, Yu Tzong-shian, Mai Chao-cheng, and George C. Tiao; and legal scholars Hu Fo and Hungdah Chiu.

Many of the university's graduates have gone on to found or head major companies, including Quanta Computer's Barry Lam, Mediatek's Tsai Ming-kai and Garmin's Min Kao.

Foreign alumni of the university include Canadian philosopher Roger T. Ames, who graduated from NTU with a master's degree in philosophy in 1972; British diplomat David Coates, ambassador of the United Kingdom to Ivory Coast; Roel Sterckx, Joseph Needham Professor of Chinese History at the University of Cambridge; and South Korean philosopher Do-ol, who earned a master's degree from NTU.

== See also ==
- National Taiwan University Hospital
- List of universities in Taiwan
- Education in Taiwan
- Imperial Universities
- Taiwanese Bunun Ancestral Remains Repatriation Case
