= Lee Si-chen =

Taiwanese engineer and researcher

- 李嗣涔
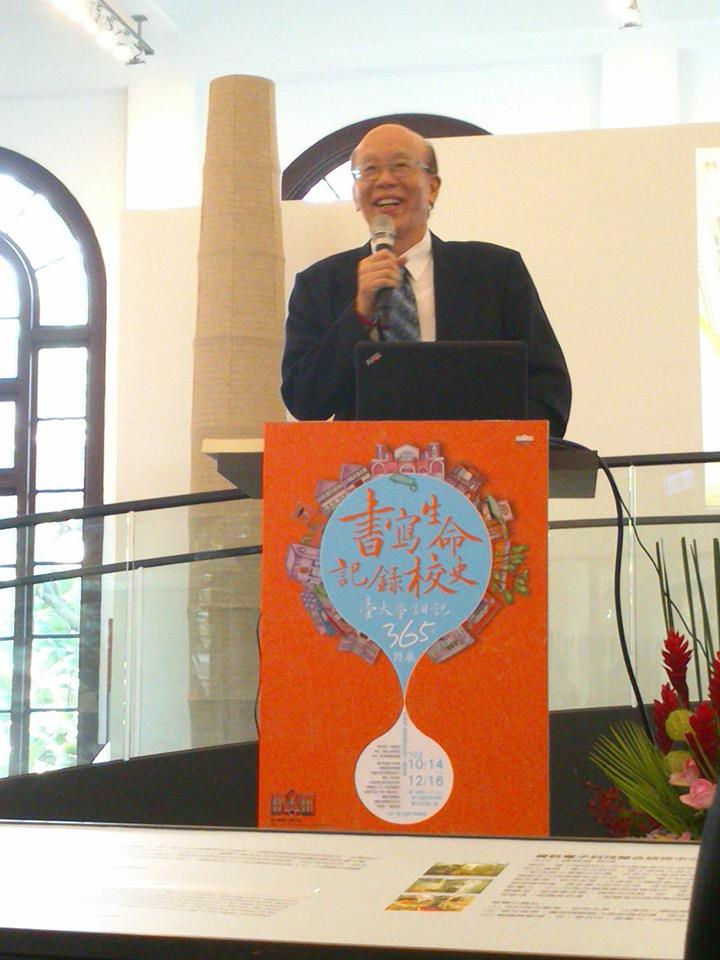
- Lee in 2013

President of National Taiwan University
- In office June 2005 – June 21, 2013
- Preceded by: Chen Wei-jao
- Succeeded by: Pan-Chyr Yang

Personal details
- Born: August 13, 1952 (age 73) Gangshan, Taiwan
- Education: National Taiwan University (BS); Stanford University (MS, PhD)
- Occupation: Electrical engineering professor
- Scientific career
- Fields: Electrical engineering
- Thesis: Preparation and properties of aluminum gallium arsenide-gallium-arsenide double heterojunction devices (1981)
- Doctoral advisor: Gerald Pearson

Lee Si-chen (Chinese: 李嗣涔; pinyin: Lǐ Sìcén; Wade–Giles: Lǐ Sì-tsén; Pe̍h-ōe-jī: Lí Sû-chhâm; born 13 August 1952), is a Taiwanese electrical engineer and academic specializing in semiconductor and amorphous silicon research. From 2005 to 2013, he was the president of National Taiwan University, where he has been a professor of electrical engineering since 1982.

== Early life and education ==
Lee was born on August 13, 1952, in Gangshan, Kaohsiung. After attending National Tainan First Senior High School, he graduated from National Taiwan University with a Bachelor of Science (B.S.) in electrical engineering in 1974. He completed doctoral studies in the United States, earning a Master of Science (M.S.) in 1977 and his Ph.D. in 1981, both in electrical engineering from Stanford University. His doctoral dissertation, completed under physicist Gerald Pearson, was titled, "Preparation and properties of aluminum gallium arsenide-gallium-arsenide double heterojunction devices".

== Academic career ==
Lee was the president of National Taiwan University from 2005 to 2013, and became the president of the Association of National Universities of Taiwan in 2006, and the chair of the University Mobility in Asia and the Pacific in 2005. He has been a professor of electrical engineering at National Taiwan University since 1985.

=== Experiences and training ===
He was named an IEEE Fellow in 2002. From 1996 to 2002, he served as dean of academic affairs at National Taiwan University. He was assistant to the minister of national defense from 1993 to 1994 and director of the Department of Electrical Engineering at National Taiwan University from 1989 to 1992. He also held the position of Vice Directorate of the IEEE Taipei Section from 2001 to 2002 and served on the Directorate of the Chinese Association of Electromagnetism in Life Science from 1999 to 2004. From 1992 to 2004, he was an associate editor for Materials Chemistry and Physics. Earlier in his academic career, he was an associate professor in the Department of Electrical Engineering at National Taiwan University from 1982 to 1985. From 1980 to 1982, he worked as a researcher at Energy Conversion Devices, Inc. in Troy, Michigan. He served as associate editor of the Journal of Chinese Engineers from 1996 to 2000. Additionally, he led the Bioenergy Field Group in the Biology Department of the National Science Council from 1992 to 1998 and was on the Directorate of the Association of Chinese Electrical Engineers from 1992 to 1994. From 1988 to 1993, he led the Microelectronics Group in the Engineering Department of the National Science Council. He also served as a consultant for the ERSO of ITRI during the periods 1991–1992 and 1986–1989.

== Honors and awards ==
He received the degree of Doctor Honoris Causa conferred by Kansai University in 2005. In 2003, he was honored with the 47th Academic Award of the Ministry of Education from the Institute of Electrical and Electronics Engineers. He received the Annual Medal from the Chinese Association of Electrical Engineers in 2002, and in the same year, he was named an IEEE Fellow. In 2000, he was awarded the IEEE Third Millennium Medal for outstanding achievements and contributions in electronic devices. He became a member of the Asia-Pacific Academy of Materials in 1997. From 1996 to 2002, he served as a special contracted researcher for the National Science Council. He also received the Outstanding Research Awards from the National Science Council from 1986 to 1996. In 1987, he was recognized as a Young Distinguished Engineer by the Chinese Engineer Association and was also awarded the Sun Yat-Sen Academic Award in Engineering.
