= Chen Wei-jao =

Taiwanese surgeon and academic administrator

- 陳維昭

President of National Taiwan University
- In office 22 June 1993 – June 2005
- Preceded by: Kuo Kuang-hsiung
- Succeeded by: Lee Si-chen

Personal details
- Born: 15 November 1939 (age 86) Taichū Prefecture, Taiwan, Empire of Japan
- Education: National Taiwan University (MD); Tohoku University (DMS); Johns Hopkins University (MPH)

Chinese name
- Traditional Chinese: 陳維昭
- Hanyu Pinyin: Chén Wéizhāo
- Hokkien POJ: Tân Ûi-chiau
- Tâi-lô: Tân Uî-tsiau

Chen Wei-jao (Chinese: 陳維昭; pinyin: Chén Wéizhāo; Pe̍h-ōe-jī: Tân Ûi-chiau; born 15 November 1939) is a Taiwanese surgeon and academic administrator.

== Early life and education ==
Chen was born in Taichū Prefecture on 15 November 1939. He attended medical school at National Taiwan University, where he graduated with a Doctor of Medicine (M.D.), then completed his residency at National Taiwan University Hospital. After being a lecturer at NTU, Chen earned his Doctor of Medical Science (D.M.S.) from Tohoku University in 1973 and earned a Master of Public Health (M.P.H.) from Johns Hopkins University in 1989.

== Medical career ==
Chen was the lead surgeon in a groundbreaking September 1979 operation to separate conjoined twins. The twins were born with three legs between them and joined at the hip. The surgery was broadcast live on television. It was also the fourth successful separation of conjoined twins ever performed. Chen was named deputy director of the NTU Hospital in 1987 and became dean of the NTU college of medicine in 1991.

== National Taiwan University presidency and subsequent career ==
Chen was the first elected president of National Taiwan University, and took office on 22 June 1993. As university president, Chen issued formal apologies for NTU's role in White Terror political persecution, namely the 6 April incident of 1949 that led to the arrests of several student dissidents (in 2001), and the 1974 National Taiwan University Philosophy Department incident, which resulted in the dismissal of several faculty members accused of communist leanings (in 2003). Due to the 2003 SARS outbreak, Chen presided over NTU's first online commencement ceremony that year. In May 2004, Chen announced that the Gallery of University History was to be established in the old university library. He attended its dedication in June 2005 before stepping down as president. The Ministry of Education named Lee Si-chen Chen's successor as university president in June 2005. Chen was considered a candidate for vice president of the Republic of China in Ma Ying-jeou's 2008 presidential campaign. The Kuomintang confirmed Ma and Vincent Siew as its ticket. Chen later led the Institute for Biotechnology and Medicine Industry. Chen was convener of the presidential selection committee that named Kuan Chung-ming as NTU president in January 2018. Despite alleged conflicts of interest between committee members and Kuan, Chen supported Kuan selection on grounds of university autonomy, and the Ministry of Education confirmed Kaun's appointment in December 2018.
