= List of National Taiwan University people =

The list of National Taiwan University people includes alumni and prominent faculty and staff.

== Nobel Prize Laureate ==
- Yuan-Tseh Lee (李遠哲): Chemistry, 1986

== Wolf Prize Laureates ==
- Shang Fa Yang (楊祥發): Agriculture, 1991, after whom the Yang cycle is named
- Chi-Huey Wong (翁啟惠): Chemistry, 2014; Professor of Chemistry, the Scripps Research Institute; former President of Academia Sinica

== Turing Award Laureate ==
- Andrew Yao (姚期智): Turing Award, 2000 (the only ethnic Chinese recipient to date); Professor, Tsinghua University, Beijing

== University chancellors ==
- Tien, Chang-lin (田長霖): the 8th Chancellor, University of California, Berkeley
- Henry T. Yang (楊祖佑): the 5th Chancellor, University of California, Santa Barbara

== Sciences and Engineering ==
- Wu-Chung Hsiang (項武忠): Professor Emeritus of Mathematics, Princeton University
- Tai-Ping Liu (劉太平): Professor Emeritus of Mathematics, Stanford University
- Sun-Yung Alice Chang (張聖容): Professor of Mathematics at Princeton University, member of the US National Academy of Sciences
- Fan Chung (金芳蓉): Professor of Mathematics, University of California, San Diego
- C. F. Jeff Wu (吳建福): Coca-Cola Chair in Engineering Statistics and Professor in the H. Milton School of Industrial and Systems Engineering at Georgia Tech
- Ching-Li Chai (翟敬立): Professor of Mathematics, University of Pennsylvania
- Chang-Shou Lin (林長壽): mathematician, Academician of Academia Sinica
- Shen Chun-shan (沈君山): physicist, former President of National Tsing Hua University in Taiwan, politician, writer, Go player, bridge player
- Leroy Chang (張立綱): physicist, member of the US National Academy of Sciences, Academician of Academia Sinica
- Yuen-Ron Shen (沈元壤): physicist, member of the US National Academy of Sciences
- Nai-Chang Yeh (葉乃裳): physicist, Professor of Physics at Caltech
- Chu Kwo-Ray (朱國瑞): physicist, Academician of Academia Sinica
- Louis Lee (李羅權): space physicist, member of the US National Academy of Engineering
- Larry Hsien Ping Lang (郎咸平): Chair professor of finance at The Chinese University of Hong Kong
- Ruey-Shiung Lin (林瑞雄): Professor Emeritus of Public health, National Taiwan University
- Jiun-Huei Proty Wu: physics professor and Deputy Vice President for International Affairs, National Taiwan University
- Vincent Chang: President and Vice-Chancellor of BRAC University
- Wen Chi Chen (陳文琦): president and CEO of VIA Technologies
- Cindy (Hsin-Liu) Kao (高新綠): Researcher and founder of Cornell University's Hybrid Body Lab
- Min H. Kao (高民環): co-founder of Garmin Corporation, the GPS manufacturer
- Barry Lam (林百里): co-maker of the first computer in Taiwan, founder and chair of Quanta Computer
- Rick Tsai (蔡力行): president and CEO of Taiwan Semiconductor Manufacturing Company
- Benjamin Hsiao (BS, Chemical Engineering 1980) : Chief Research Officer and Vice-President for Research at Stony Brook University, Fellow of the American Physical Society, Fellow of the American Chemical Society, Fellow of the American Association for the Advancement of Science
- Chun-Hway Hsueh: ISI high-cited researcher in materials science; Distinguished R&D Staff, Metals & Ceramics Division, Oak Ridge National Laboratory
- Jin Au Kong (孔金甌): Professor of Electrical Engineering, Massachusetts Institute of Technology
- Lee Si-Chen (李嗣涔): semiconductor researcher; IEEE Fellow, 2002; Professor of Electrical Engineering, National Taiwan University; former President of NTU
- Winnie Li (李文卿): Professor of Mathematics at Pennsylvania State University, Chern Prize (ICCM) recipient
- Chang-Shou Lin (林長壽): Director, Taida Institute of Mathematical Sciences (TIMS), Fellow of Academia Sinica
- Ching-Liang Lin (Chinese: 林清凉; 1931–2019): Professor of Physics, National Taiwan University
- Tai-Ping Liu (劉太平): Director, Institute of Mathematics, Academia Sinica
- Ho-Kwang Mao (毛河光): Balzan Prize, 2005; Gregori Aminoff Prize, 2005; Roebling Medal, 2005; Staff, Geophysical Laboratory, Carnegie Institution of Washington
- Chiang-Chung Mei (梅強中): Professor of Civil and Environmental Engineering, Massachusetts Institute of Technology
- Teresa H. Meng (孟懷縈): Reid Weaver Dennis Professor of Electrical Engineering, Stanford University; Founder of Atheros Communications, Inc.
- Shen-su Sun (孫賢鉥): geochemist
- Simon Min Sze (施敏): pioneer in MOSFET; IEEE J J Ebers Award, 1991
- Chenming Calvin Hu (胡正明):pioneer in FinFET; Distinguished Professor Emeritus in the electronic engineering and computer science department of the University of California, Berkeley.
- Tsay Ting-kuei (蔡丁貴), Professor of Civil Engineering, National Taiwan University since 1990
- C.F. Jeff Wu (吳建福): Coca-Cola Chair in Engineering Statistics, Georgia Institute of Technology; Member, National Academy of Engineering, USA
- Horng-Tzer Yau (姚鴻澤): MacArthur Fellowship, 2000; Professor of Mathematics, Harvard University
- Nai-Chang Yeh (葉乃裳): Professor of Physics, California Institute of Technology
- Tsuhan Chen: Former Deputy President Research and Technology, National University of Singapore
- Yuan Taur: Distinguished Professor of Electrical and Computer Engineering (ECE) at the University of California, San Diego.
- Phillip C.-Y. Sheu:Professor of electrical engineering, computer science and biomedical engineering at the University of California, Irvine.
- Keh-Chyuan Tsai (蔡克銓), Professor of Civil Engineering, International Member of US National Academy of Engineering, former Director of NCREE
- Yin T. Hsieh (謝英鐸), agronomist

== Life sciences ==
- Chuan-Chiung Chang (張傳烱): co-discoverer of bungarotoxin; Professor Emeritus of Pharmacology, National Taiwan University
- Ding-Shinn Chen, M.D. (陳定信): authority on hepatitis B and hepatocellular carcinoma; Dean, NTU College of Medicine; Foreign Member, National Academy of Sciences, USA
- Lan-Bo Chen (陳良博): Professor of Pathology, Harvard Medical School
- Pei-Jer Chen, M.D. (陳培哲): authority on hepatitis D virus; Howard Hughes Medical Institute International Research Scholar; Professor of Medicine, NTU
- Wei-Jao Chen, M.D. (陳維昭): President, NTU, 1993–2005; pioneer in surgical separation of ischiopagus tripus conjoined twins
- Yuan-Tsong Chen, M.D. (陳垣崇): inventor of Myozyme, the first EMEA- and U.S. Food and Drug Administration-approved treatment for Pompe disease (approved in 2006); Director, Institute of Biomedical Sciences, Academia Sinica; former Chief and professor, the Pediatrics Division of Medical Genetics, Duke University Medical Center
- Shu Chien, M.D. (錢煦): University Professor, University of California; President, the American Physiological Society, 1990–1; President Elect, the Biomedical Engineering Society, USA, 2005-6
- Fushih Pan, PhD: Plastic Surgeon, Developer of the MIRA Procedure
- Su-Ming Hsu, M.D. (許世明): ISI highly cited researcher in clinical medicine (cited more than 10,000 times between 1981 and 1992); Professor of Pathology, NTU
- Lily Y. Jan (葉公杼): Howard Hughes Medical Institute investigator, Professor of Physiology and Biophysics, University of California, San Francisco
- Yuh Nung Jan (詹裕農): Howard Hughes Medical Institute investigator, Professor of Molecular Physiology, University of California, San Francisco
- George Kuo, Co-discoverer of Hepatitis C
- Michael M. C. Lai, M.D. (賴明詔): President, National Cheng Kung University, 2007–2011; Vice President, Academia Sinica, 2003–2007; Distinguished Professor of Molecular Microbiology and Immunology, University of Southern California; Howard Hughes Medical Institute Investigator, 1990–2003
- Chen-Yuan Lee, M.D. (李鎮源): co-discoverer of bungarotoxin; Redi Award, 1976; Former President, International Society on Toxinology
- Ming T. Tsuang, M.D. (莊明哲): University Professor, University of California; Director, Institute of Behavioral Genomics, University of California, San Diego; Director, Harvard Institute of Psychiatric Epidemiology and Genetics
- James C. Wang (王倬): discoverer of topoisomerase; Chair (1983–1985) and Professor (1977–2005), Department of Molecular and Cellular Biology, Harvard University
- Tsay Yi-fang: Distinguished fellow at Academia Sinica's Institute of Molecular Biology

== Politics ==
- Tsai Ing-wen (蔡英文): President of Republic of China (Taiwan), 2016–2024
- Ma Ying-jeou (馬英九): President of Republic of China (Taiwan), 2008–2016
- Chen Shui-bian (陳水扁): President of Republic of China (Taiwan), 2000–2008; lawyer
- Lee Teng-hui (李登輝): President of Republic of China (Taiwan), 1988–2000; agricultural economist
- Lai Ching-te (賴清德), M.D.: President of Republic of China (Taiwan), 2024–; Vice President of Republic of China (Taiwan), 2020–2024
- Wu Den-yih (吳敦義): Vice President of Republic of China (Taiwan), 2012–2016
- Lu, Annette (呂秀蓮): feminist, Vice President of Republic of China (Taiwan), 2000–2008
- Lien Chan (連戰): Vice President of Republic of China (Taiwan), 1996–2000
- Su Tseng-chang (蘇貞昌): Premier of Republic of China (Taiwan)
- Chang San-cheng (張善政): engineer, Premier of Republic of China (Taiwan), 2016-2016
- Sean Chen (陳冲): Premier of Republic of China (Taiwan), 2012-2013; banker
- Frank Hsieh (謝長廷): Representative, Taipei Economic and Cultural Representative Office in Japan; Premier of Republic of China (Taiwan), 2005–2006
- Hsu Tzong-Li (許宗力): Chief Justice and President of Judicial Yuan; Professor, Department of Law, National Taiwan University
- Lin Yang-kang (林洋港): Chief Justice and President of Judicial Yuan, R.O.C., 1987–1994
- Chang Po-ya (張博雅), M.P.H.: President of Control Yuan, 2014–2020; Minister of Health, 1979–1986
- Fredrick Chien (錢復): diplomat, Minister of Foreign Affairs, R.O.C., 1990-1996; President of Control Yuan 1999–2005
- General Chen Chao-min, M.B.A. (陳肇敏): Minister of National Defense
- Chen Ding-nan (陳定南): Minister of Justice, 2000–2005
- Huang Kuo-chang (黃國昌): lawyer, social activist, legislator
- Chen, Sisy (陳文茜): writer, talk show host
- Chang Chau-hsiung, M.D. (張昭雄): Vice-chair of People First Party, 2000–, 1st President of Chang Gung University
- Joe Hung (洪健昭): journalist (Central News Agency), translator and diplomat, Representative of Taiwan to Italy, 1993–2000
- Kao Chia-yu (高嘉瑜): Councillor of the 11th to 13th Taipei City Council; 14th President of NTU Student Association
- Lin Yi-hsiung (林義雄): chairman, Democratic Progressive Party, 1998–2000
- Li Ao (李敖): A writer, social commentator, historian, independent scholar and politician in the Republic of China (Taiwan).
- Peng Ming-min (彭明敏): former chair and professor, Department of Political Science, NTU; political activist for Taiwan independence
- Shen Fu-hsiung, M.D. (沈富雄): Member, Legislative Yuan, R.O.C., 1992–2004; former associate professor, University of Washington, Seattle; former director, Hemodialysis Unit, Seattle Veterans Administration Hospital
- Chen Changwen: president of Red Cross Society of the Republic of China and the secretary of Straits Exchange Foundation.

== Arts, Humanities and Social Sciences ==
- Russell Leong: artist; Professor of English and Asian-American Studies, University of California, Los Angeles
- Sun Kang-i (孫康宜): Malcolm G. Chace '56 Professor of East Asian Languages and Literature, Yale University (1966-68 Graduate Institute of Foreign Languages, completed all the course requirements except for the M.A. thesis)
- David Schaberg: professor, Department of Asian Languages & Cultures, University of California, Los Angeles (1986-1988 Elective Student, Dept. of Chinese Literature)
- Li Yih-yuan (李亦園): Academician of Academia Sinica; professor, Dept. of Anthropology, NTU (B.A. Anthropology 1953)
- Kwang-chih Chang (張光直): pioneer in Chinese archaeology in the US; vice president of Academia Sinica; member of the US National Academy of Sciences; professor of anthropology, Harvard University (B.A. anthropology 1954)
- Chen Chi-nan (陳其南): Professor, National Taipei University of Arts; former director of National Palace Museum; former minister of Council for Cultural Affairs (M.A. Anthropology 1975)
- Pang-hsin Ting (丁邦新): Professor Emeritus of Chinese Linguistics, University of California, Berkeley; Academician of Academia Sinica (B.A. Chinese, 1959; M.A. Chinese 1963)
- Cho-yun Hsu (許倬雲): Academician of Academia Sinica; Professor Emeritus of History and Sociology, University of Pittsburgh (B.A. History 1953; M.A. History 1956)
- Liu Ts'ui-jung (劉翠溶): Academician and former vice president of Academia Sinica (B.A. History 1953; M.A. History 1956)
- Jing-shen Tao (陶晉生): Academician of Academia Sinica; Professor Emeritus of Chinese history, University of Arizona (B.A. History 1956; M.A. History 1959)
- Tu Cheng-sheng (杜正勝): Academician of Academia Sinica; former Minister of Education; former director of National Palace Museum (B.A. History 1970; M.A. History 1974)
- Shih Shou-chien (石守謙): Distinguished Research Fellow, Institute of History and Philology, Academia Sinica; Academician of Academia Sinica; former director of National Palace Museum (B.A. History 1973, M.A. History 1977)
- Chin-Shing Huang (黃進興): academician and vice president of Academia Sinica (B.A. History 1973; M.A. History 1975)
- Wu Mi-cha (吳密察): Director of National Palace Museum (B.A. History 1978)
- Roel Sterckx: Joseph Needham Professor of Chinese History, Science and Civilization at the University of Cambridge and Fellow of Clare College
- Wai-lim Yip (葉維廉): poet; Professor Emeritus of Chinese and Comparative Literature at University of California, San Diego (B.A. Foreign Languages and Literature)
- Leo Ou-fan Lee (李歐梵): Professor Emeritus of Chinese Literature, Harvard University; Academician of Academia Sinica (B.A. Foreign Languages and Literature 1961)
- David Der-wei Wang (王德威): literary critic and historian, Edward C. Henderson Professor of East Asian Languages and Cultures, Harvard University, Academician of Academia Sinica (B.A. Foreign Languages and Literature 1976)
- I, Lo-fen (衣若芬): Associate Professor, Department of Chinese Literature, Nanyang Technological University (B.A. Chinese, M.A. 1989, PhD. 1994)
- Yu Kwang-chung (余光中): poet, essayist, critic, translator, Professor of Foreign Languages and Literature at NSYSU (B.A. Foreign Languages and Literature 1954)
- Lin Wenyue (林文月): essayist, translator of Japanese literature including The Tale of Genji; Professor Emerita, Dept. of Chinese Literature, NTU (B.A. Chinese, M.A. 1958)
- Pai Hsien-yung (白先勇): National Awards for Arts winning novelist, Professor Emeritus at University of California, Santa Barbara (B.A. Foreign Languages and Literature 1961)
- Cheng Ch'ing-wen (鄭清文): National Awards for Arts winning novelist; banker
- Wang Wen-hsing (王文興): National Awards for Arts winning novelist, Professor of Foreign Languages and Literature at NTU (B.A. Foreign Languages and Literature 1961)
- Chen Ruoxi (陳若曦): National Awards for Arts winning novelist (B.A. Foreign Languages and Literature 1961)
- Chu Tʽien-hsin (朱天心): novelist (B.A. History)
- Ping Lu (平路): novelist (B.A. Psychology)
- Li Kotomi (李琴峰): Akutagawa Prize winning fiction writer (B.A. Japanese & Chinese)
- Angela Yang: multicultural and outreach services librarian, President of Chinese American Librarians Association from 1992 to 1993
- Lü Shao-chia (呂紹嘉): orchestra and opera conductor (B.A. Psychology 1983)
- Lucie Cheng (成露茜): sociologist, first permanent director of the Asian American Studies Center at the University of California, Los Angeles
- Hsiao-ting Lin (林孝庭): Research Fellow and Curator of East Asian Collection at the Hoover Institution, Stanford University
- Jiang Yi-huah (江宜樺): Bauhinia Chair Professor of Institute of Strategic and International Affairs at National Chung Cheng University, former Premier of Republic of China
- Cyrus Chu(朱敬一): economist, member of the US National Academy of Sciences, Academician of Academia Sinica, former Ambassador and Permanent Representative of the Separate Customs Territory of Taiwan, Penghu, Kinmen and Matsu to the World Trade Organization
- Jang Show-ling (鄭秀玲): economist, former legislator
- I Lo-fen (衣若芬): scholar of literature
- Christian Helmut Wenzel, Distinguished Professor of Philosophy

== Business and Financial Sectors ==
- Koo Chen-fu (辜振甫): Former Chairman of the Koos Group of companies
- Chang Yi Wang: Chairperson and CEO of the United Biomedical, Inc. (UBI) Group of companies.

== Entertainment ==
- Wakin Chau (周華健): (B.S., Mathematics) singer
- Alec Su (蘇有朋): (non-graduate, Mechanical Engineering) singer, actor
- Wen Shang-yi (怪獸 溫尚翊): (non-graduate, sociology) guitarist and band leader of Mayday
- William Wei (韋禮安): (B.A., Foreign Languages & Literature) singer
- Tsai Lan-chin (蔡藍欽): (non-graduate, Mechanical Engineering) singer and songwriter
- Chen Kuangyi (陳匡怡): actress and model
- Smire Weng (翁滋蔓): TV show host
