= Jewell James Ebers =

American electrical engineer (1921 to 1959)

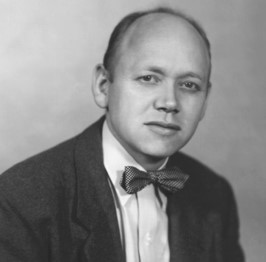
Jewell James Ebers

Jewell James Ebers (November 25, 1921 – March 30, 1959) was an American electrical engineer who is remembered for the mathematical model of the bipolar junction transistor that he published with John L. Moll in 1954. The Ebers-Moll model of the transistor views the transistor as a pair of diodes, and the model is a fusion of the models of these diodes.

J.J. Ebers was born in Grand Rapids, Michigan on November 25, 1921. He served three years in the U.S. Army. Ebers attended Antioch College where he obtained a Bachelor of Science degree in 1946. He entered Ohio State University studying electrical engineering, obtaining his master's degree in 1947 and Ph.D. in 1950. Ebers continued at Ohio State as a research associate in the university's research foundation, as an instructor, and as an assistant professor until 1951.

In September 1951 Ebers joined Bell Labs in Murray Hill, New Jersey. There he worked with J.L. Moll with whom he published the frequently-cited article on "Large-signal behavior of junction transistors" which is the basis of the Ebers-Moll model. According to James M. Early, Ebers' technical contributions, qualities of personal leadership, and management skill led to promotions to supervisor, department head, and Director of the Allentown Lab of Bell.

Ebers was a member of Eta Kappa Nu, Sigma Xi, and the American Physical Society.

Jewell James Ebers died on March 30, 1959, following an undisclosed short illness.

As a memorial to his scientific work, every year the IEEE Electron Devices Society grants the J J Ebers Award to a worthy engineer.
