= IEEE Andrew S. Grove Award =

Award conferred by the Institute of Electrical and Electronics Engineers

- Awarded for: "Outstanding contributions to solid-state devices and technology"
- Country: United States
- Presented by: Institute of Electrical and Electronics Engineers
- Formerly called: IEEE Jack A. Morton Award (1976–1999)
- Rewards: Bronze medal, certificate, and honorarium
- Website: IEEE Andrew S. Grove Award

The IEEE Andrew S. Grove Award is a Technical Field Award presented by the IEEE "for outstanding contributions to solid-state devices and technology." The award may be presented to an individual or a team of up to three people. It was established in 1976 as the IEEE Jack A. Morton Award, and was renamed in 1999. The award is named in honor of the lifetime achievements of Andrew S. Grove, including helping to found Intel Corporation.

Recipients of this award receive a bronze medal, certificate, and honorarium.

== Recipients ==
- 1976 – Robert N. Hall
- 1977 – Morgan Sparks
- 1978 – Juri Matisoo
- 1979 – Martin P. Lepselter
- 1980 – James F. Gibbons
- 1981 – Nick Holonyak
- 1982 – Dov Frohman-Bentchkowsky
- 1983 – Jun-ichi Nishizawa
- 1984 – Hans S. Rupprecht and Jerry M. Woodall
- 1985 – Robert D. Burnham, William Streifer, and Donald R. Scifres
- 1986 – Herbert Kroemer
- 1987 – Dennis D. Buss, Richard A. Chapman, and Michael A. Kinch
- 1988 – Frank Stern
- 1989 – Chih-Tang Sah
- 1990 – Gregory E. Stillman and Charles M. Wolfe
- 1991 – Tak H. Ning
- 1992 – Takuo Sugano
- 1993 – Toshihisa Tsukada
- 1994 – Robert E. Kerwin, Donald L. Klein, and John C. Sarace
- 1995 – Yoshio Nishi
- 1996 – Robert W. Dutton
- 1997 – Chenming Hu
- 1998 – Isamu Akasaki and Shuji Nakamura
- 1999 – Charles H. Henry
- 2000 – Wolfgang Fichtner
- 2001 – Al F. Tasch
- 2002 – Dimitri A. Antoniadis
- 2003 – Mark Bohr
- 2004 – Krishna Saraswat
- 2005 – Tso-Ping Ma
- 2006 – Chang-Gyu Hwang
- 2007 – James D. Plummer
- 2008 – Stefan Lai
- 2009 – Eric Fossum
- 2010 – Bijan Davari
- 2011 – Judy Hoyt and Eugene Fitzgerald
- 2012 – Jean-Pierre Colinge
- 2013 – Shinichi Takagi
- 2014 – Sanjay Banerjee
- 2015 – Masayoshi Esashi
- 2016 – Carlos H. Diaz
- 2017 – Sorin Cristoloveanu
- 2018 – Gurtej Sandhu
- 2019 – Digh Hisamoto
- 2020 – Evelyn L. Hu
- 2021 – Hideaki Aochi, Ryota Katsumata, and Masaru Kito
- 2022 – Heike Riel
- 2023 – H.-S. Philip Wong
- 2024 – Tsunenobu Kimoto
- 2025 – Sayeef Salahuddin
- 2026 – Suman Datta
- 2027 – John R. Brews
