= J. J. Ebers Award =

Award of the IEEE

The J. J. Ebers Award was established in 1971 to foster progress in electron devices. It commemorates Jewell James Ebers, whose contributions, particularly to transistors, shaped the understanding and technology of electron devices. It is presented annually to one or more individuals who have made either a single or a series of contributions of recognized scientific, economic, or social significance in the broad field of electron devices. The recipient (or recipients) is awarded a certificate and check for $5,000, presented at the International Electron Devices Meeting.

== Recipients ==
The past recipients are:

- 1971 John L. Moll
- 1972 Charles W. Mueller
- 1973 Herbert Kroemer
- 1974 Andrew S. Grove
- 1975 Jacques I. Pankove
- 1976 Marion E. Hines
- 1977 Anthony E. Siegman
- 1978 Hung C. Lin
- 1979 James M. Early
- 1980 James D. Meindl
- 1981 Chih-Tang Sah
- 1982 Arthur G. Milnes
- 1983 Adolf Goetzberger
- 1984 Izuo Hayashi
- 1985 Walter F. Kosonocky
- 1986 Pallab K. Chatterjee
- 1987 Robert W. Dutton
- 1988 Al F. Tasch Jr.
- 1989 Tak H. Ning
- 1990 Yoshiyuki Takeishi
- 1991 Simon Min Sze
- 1992 Louis C. Parrillo
- 1993 Karl Hess
- 1994 Alfred U. Macrae
- 1995 Martin A. Green
- 1996 Tetsushi Sakai
- 1997 Marvin H. White
- 1998 B. Jayant Baliga
- 1999 James T. Clemens
- 2000 Bernard S. Meyerson
- 2001 Hiroshi Iwai
- 2002 Lester F. Eastman
- 2003 James D. Plummer
- 2004 Jerry G. Fossum
- 2005 Bijan Davari "for contributions to deep-submicron CMOS technology and their impact on the IC industry"
- 2006 Ghavam Shahidi "for contributions and leadership in the development of Silicon-On-Insulator CMOS technology"
- 2007 Stephen J. Pearton "for developing advanced compound-semiconductor processing techniques, and clarifying the roles of defects and impurities in compound-semiconductor devices"
- 2008 Mark R. Pinto "for contributions to widely applied semiconductor technology simulation tools"
- 2009 Baruch Levush "for contributions to the development of widely applied simulation tools in the vacuum electronics industry"
- 2010 Mark E. Law "for contributions to widely used silicon integrated circuit process modeling"
- 2011 Stuart Wenham "for technical contributions and successful commercialization of high efficiency solar cells"
- 2012 Yuan Taur "for contributions to the advancement of several generations of CMOS process technologies"
- 2013 Nobukazu Teranishi "for development of the pinned photodiode concept widely used in image sensors"
- 2014 Joachim N. Burghartz "for contributions to integrated spiral inductors for Wireless communication ICs and ultra-thin silicon devices for emerging flexible electronics"
- 2015 Jack Yuan-Chen Sun "for sustained leadership and technical contributions to energy efficient foundry CMOS technologies"
- 2016 Jaroslav Hynecek "for the pioneering work and advancement of CCD and CMOS image sensor technologies"
- 2017 Kang L. Wang "for contributions and leadership in strained SiGe and magnetic memory technologies"
- 2018 Michael Shur "for pioneering the concept of ballistic transport in nanoscale semiconductor devices"
- 2019 H.-S. Philip Wong "for pioneering contributions to the scaling of silicon devices and technology"
- 2020 Arokia Nathan ”for his work with thin-film transistor and flexible/foldable electronics integration strategies.
- 2021 Bruce Gnade "for materials contributions to CMOS and flexible electronics technologies"
- 2022 Albert Wang "for pioneering contributions to reliability of 3D heterogeneous integration in Integrated Circuits"
- 2023 Mukta Farooq "for development of emerging heterogeneous integration architectures for 3D ICs"
- 2024 Yue Kuo "for oustanding contributions to thin film transistors"
- 2025 Anthony Yen "for sustained contributions and leadership in advancing semiconductor lithography, especially the development of extreme ultraviolet lithography"

== See also ==
- IEEE Andrew S. Grove Award
