= Alfred U. MacRae =

American physicist (1932–2023)

Alfred Urquhart MacRae (April 14, 1932 – February 15, 2023) was an American physicist.

== Life and career ==
MacRae was born in New York City on April 14, 1932. MacRae is of Scottish descent, and learned how to play the bagpipes, which he did throughout college. MacRae earned his bachelor's and graduate degrees at Syracuse University, where he studied physics. Upon completing his doctorate in 1960, MacRae began working for Bell Labs. He was elected a fellow of the American Physical Society in 1964. MacRae later led his own company, MacRae Technologies. He was the 1994 recipient of the J. J. Ebers Award, presented by the Institute of Electrical and Electronics Engineers' Electron Devices Society at the International Electron Devices Meeting. In 2003, MacRae was elected to membership of the National Academy of Engineering.

MacRae died on February 15, 2023, at the age of 90.
