= Deji Akinwande =

Nigerian-American professor of Electrical and Computer Engineering

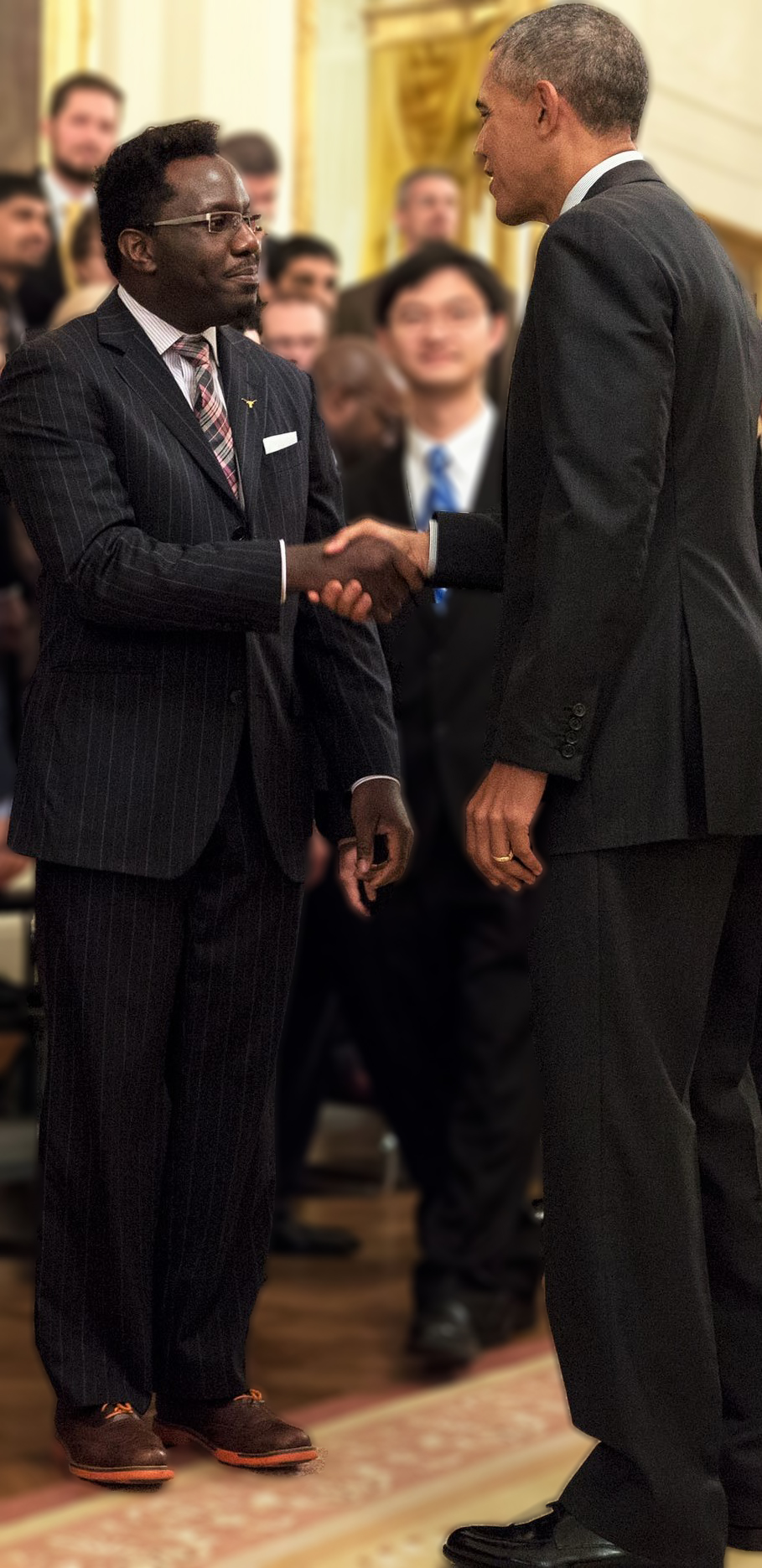
- Akinwande shakes hands with President Barack Obama, while receiving the PECASE in 2016
- Education: Stanford University; Case Western Reserve University
- Known for: 2D materials, flexible and wearable nanoelectronics, nanotechnology, STEM education
- Awards: PECASE, given in 2016; Fellow of American Physical Society; Fellow of IEEE; Fellow of the MRS
- Scientific career
- Workplaces: University of Texas at Austin
- Thesis: Carbon nanotubes: device physics, RF circuits, surface science and nanotechnology (2009)
- Doctoral advisor: H.-S. Philip Wong
- Website: https://nano.mer.utexas.edu/

Deji Akinwande is a Nigerian-American professor of Electrical and Computer Engineering with courtesy affiliation with Materials Science, and Biomedical Engineering at the University of Texas at Austin. He was awarded the Presidential Early Career Award for Scientists and Engineers in 2016 from Barack Obama. He is a Fellow of the American Physical Society, the African Academy of Sciences, the Materials Research Society (MRS), and the IEEE.

== Early life and education ==
Akinwande was born in Washington, DC and moved to Nigeria in his early years. He grew up in Ikeja with his parents. His father was the financial controller of Guardian News and his mother worked at the Ministry of Education. He attended Federal Government College, Idoani and became interested in science and engineering. He returned to America in 1994, starting at Cuyahoga community college and eventually transferring to Case Western Reserve University to study electrical engineering and applied physics. During his master's degree he pioneered the design of near-field microwave tips for non-destructive imaging. He was accepted to Stanford University as a graduate student, working on the electronic properties of carbon-based materials. He was selected as an Alfred P. Sloan Foundation Fellow during his PhD. He was also selected as a DARE (Diversifying Academia, Recruiting Excellence) Fellow in 2008. He completed his PhD in 2009. He joined University of Texas at Austin in 2010 as an Assistant Professor in January 2010, and was awarded research grants from several agencies including the National Science Foundation (NSF), Army Research Office (ARO), the Defense Threat Reduction Agency (DTRA), DARPA, AFOSR, and Office of Naval Research, the latter focusing on high-frequency flexible 2D electronics.

== Research and career ==
Akinwande collaborated with Aixtron on wafer-scale growth of graphene, characterization and integration The collaboration demonstrated scalable growth of polycrystalline graphene using chemical vapor deposition, creating the first 300 mm wafers. In 2011 he published the first textbook on Carbon Nanotube and Graphene Device Physics with Prof. Philip Wong of Stanford University. He was made a senior member of Institute of Electrical and Electronics Engineers (IEEE) in 2013. He has made several advances in two dimensional graphene electronics. In 2015 he demonstrated the first two dimensional silicene transistor. Akinwande in collaboration with Alessandro Molle's group at CNR, Italy, achieved this by evaporating silicon onto a crystal of silver, monitoring the growth in real-time using scanning tunnelling microscopy. This research breakthrough was selected as one of the top science stories of 2015 by Discover magazine. The silicene work was the most cited Nature Nanotechnology publication of similar age.

He went on to demonstrate the thinnest most transparent electronic tattoo sensors made from graphene in 2017, which were less than 500 nm thick and 85% optically transparent. This research was in collaboration with Nanshu Lu's group. The tattoos can be laminated onto human skin like a temporary tattoo, but could measure electrocardiography, electroencephalography, temperature and hydration. Subsequently, the graphene tattoos were developed as a wearable platform for monitoring blood pressure continuously using the bio-impedance modality published in Nature Nanotechnology in 2022. He demonstrated the first atomristor by investigating nonvolatile resistance switching using a 2D atomic sheet of molybdenum disulfide. Remarkably, the memory effect persists down to a single atom. The devices can be as thin as 1.5 nm and have applications in 5G and future 6G smartphones as zero-static power radio-frequency switches, internet of things and artificial intelligence circuits. The discovery of memory in these systems is expected to be universal amongst 2D materials.

He was on the Board of Reviewing Editors for Science, an associate editor of ACS Nano, a past editor for Nature journal npj 2D Materials and Applications, and a past editor of IEEE Electron Devices Letters. He has given more than a dozen plenary and keynote talks including the plenary talk at the 2017 SPIE annual meeting Optics & Photonics, where he discussed the progress, opportunities and challenges of 2D electronic devices, and the Kavli plenary at the MRS Fall in Boston Dec. 2024. He was made an American Physical Society Fellow in 2017 and a Fulbright Fellow in 2018. He visited the Adam Mickiewicz University in Poznań in 2019 as a Fulbright Specialist Fellow. Three of his former postdoctoral scholars are now professors, Dr. Shideh Kabiri at Queen's University in Canada, Dr. Li Tao at Southeast University in Nanjing, and Dr. Seongin Hong at Gachon University. Myungsoo Kim, a former PhD student is now a Professor at UNIST in South Korea.

He was a finalist for the University of Texas at Austin 'UT System Regents’ Outstanding Teaching' Award for several years, the highest teaching recognition in Texas.

He has chaired several major conferences and program committees in nanoelectronics/nanotechnology such as:

- Gordon Research Conference on 2D materials
- Device Research Conference
- the International Electron Devices Meeting NDT Sub-committee

== Academic posts ==
- Cockrell Family Regents Chair in Engineering #8, UT-Austin 2023–Present
- Temple Foundation Endowed Professorship, UT-Austin 2020–2023
- Theodore von Kármán Fellow and visiting professor, RWTH Aachen University, 2017
- Visiting professor, Cambridge University Engineering Department, and Fellow of Pembroke College, Cambridge, 2016
- Visiting scholar, CNR, Agrate Brianza, Italy, 2016

== Publications and patents ==
- He has authored over 340 publications which have been cited over 33,000 times
- He has published 1 textbook and 3 book chapters
- He has delivered over a dozen plenary and keynote talks
- He has given more than 130 invited talks and seminars at conferences, universities and institutions
- He has 6 patents awarded or pending covering inventions in electronics and nanotechnology

== Honors and awards ==
- 2024 Kavli Plenary at the Fall Materials Research Symposium in Boston, Dec 2024
- 2023 Fellow of the Materials Research Society (MRS)
- 2021 Fellow of the Institute of Electrical and Electronics Engineers (IEEE)
- 2021 Fellow of the African Academy of Sciences
- 2018 Fulbright Specialist Fellow
- 2017 Fellow of the American Physical Society (APS)
- 2017 Alexander von Humboldt Foundation Friedrich Bessel Research Award
- 2016 Gordon and Betty Moore Foundation Inventor Fellow Award
- 2016 U.S. Presidential (PECASE) Award from President Obama
- 2015 IEEE Nanotechnology Early Career Award
- 2013 Jack Kilby Endowed Faculty Fellowship
- 2012 IEEE Geim and Novoselov Graphene Prize 2012
- 2012 National Science Foundation CAREER Award
- 2012 Defense Threat Reduction Agency Young Investigator Award
- 2012 3M Nontenured Faculty Award
- 2011 Army Research Office Young Investigator Award
- 2010 Office of Naval Research Grant Award
