= C. C. Wei =

C. C. Wei may refer to:

- Chung Ching Wei (1914–1987)
- Che-Chia Wei (born 1953)
