= Simon Sze =

Taiwanese-American electrical engineer (1936–2023)

- 施敏
- Born: 21 March 1936; Nanjing, Jiangsu, China
- Died: 6 November 2023 (aged 87)
- Citizenship: Taiwan; United States
- Education: National Taiwan University (BS); University of Washington (MS); Stanford University (PhD)
- Known for: Floating-gate MOSFET
- Awards: J. J. Ebers Award (1991); IEEE Celebrated Member (2017); Future Science Prize (2021)
- Scientific career
- Fields: Electronic engineering
- Workplaces: National Yang Ming Chiao Tung University
- Thesis: Hot Electrons in Thin Gold Films (1963)
- Doctoral advisor: John L. Moll

Simon Min Sze, or Shi Min (Chinese: 施敏; pinyin: Shī Mǐn; 21 March 1936 – 6 November 2023), was a Taiwanese-American electrical engineer. He is best known for inventing the floating-gate MOSFET with Korean electrical engineer Dawon Kahng in 1967.

== Early life and education ==
Simon Min Sze was born in Nanjing, Jiangsu, and grew up in Taiwan. After graduating from National Taiwan University in 1957, he received a master's degree from the University of Washington in 1960 and a doctorate from Stanford University in 1963.

== Career and research ==
Sze worked for Bell Labs until 1990, after which he returned to Taiwan and joined the faculty of National Chiao Tung University. He is well known for his work in semiconductor physics and technology, including his 1967 invention (with Dawon Kahng) of the floating-gate transistor, now widely used in non-volatile semiconductor memory devices. He wrote and edited many books, including Physics of Semiconductor Devices, one of the most-cited texts in its field.

== Death ==
Simon Sze died on 6 November 2023, at the age of 87.

== Recognition ==
- 1977: IEEE Fellow
- 1991: J. J. Ebers Award
- 1994: Academician of Academia Sinica, Taiwan
- 1995: Member of National Academy of Engineering, United States
- 1998: Foreign Member of Chinese Academy of Engineering, China
- 2010: Tenured Chair Professor, National Chiao Tung University, Taiwan
- 2014: Honorary Chair Professor, National Taiwan University of Science and Technology, Taiwan
- 2017: IEEE Celebrated Member
- 2021: The Future Science Prize, China
- 2022: Asian Scientist 100, Asian Scientist

== Bibliography ==
- Physics of Semiconductor Devices, S. M. Sze. New York: Wiley, 1969, ISBN 0-471-84290-7; 2nd ed., 1981, ISBN 0-471-05661-8; 3rd ed., with Kwok K. Ng, 2006, ISBN 0-471-14323-5.
- Nonvolatile Memories: Materials, Devices and Applications 2-volume set, Tseung-Yuen Tseng and Simon M. Sze. Los Angeles: American Scientific Publishers, 2012; ISBN 1-58883-250-3.
- Semiconductor Devices: Physics and Technology, S. M. Sze. New York: Wiley, 1985; 2nd ed., 2001, ISBN 0-471-33372-7; 3rd ed., 2012, ISBN 978-0470-53794-7.
- VLSI Technology, ed. S. M. Sze. New York: McGraw-Hill, 1983, ISBN 0-07-062686-3; 2nd ed., 1988, ISBN 0-07-062735-5.
- Modern Semiconductor Device Physics, ed. S. M. Sze. New York: John Wiley & Sons, Inc., 1998, ISBN 0-471-15237-4.
