= Arokia Nathan =

Electrical engineer

- Awards: Royal Society Wolfson Research Merit Award; J. J. Ebers Award

Academic background
- Education: University of Leeds; University of Alberta
- Thesis: Carrier transport in magnetotransistors (1988)
- Doctoral advisor: Henry Baltes

Arokia Nathan is an engineer, author and academic. He is an expert in the field of electrical engineering and digital display technology.

== Education ==
Nathan obtained his BSc in communication engineering from the University of Leeds in 1981. He then studied at the University of Alberta, where he received his M.S. and Ph.D. in Electrical Engineering in 1984 and 1988, respectively.

== Career ==
Following Nathan's graduation, he spent time working at both LSI Logic Corporation and ETH Zurich in the 1990s, before he joined the University of Waterloo in 1997 to chair DALSA/Natural Sciences and Engineering Research Council following the establishment of the university's Giga-to-Nanoelectronics Centre. In 2001, he was recognised by the Canadian Natural Sciences and Engineering Research Council with the E.W.R. Steacie Memorial Fellowship. In 2004, he was awarded the Canada Research Chair in nano-scale flexible circuits. He then moved to University College London in 2006 to take up the role of Chair of Nanotechnology at the London Centre for Nanotechnology. While at UCL, he was the recipient of the Royal Society Wolfson Research Merit Award.

In 2011, Nathan was recruited by the University of Cambridge as Chair of Photonic Systems and Displays, having previously worked at University College London. At Cambridge, Arokia and his team developed ultra-low power transistor electronics in 2016 and 2019, which would go on to be used in various wearables and devices using Internet of Things technology. It was believed that the ultralow power transistors could operate for years, without the need for battery replacement.

Prof. Nathan is currently in the School of Information Science and Engineering at Shandong University in Jinan City, China.

In 2020, he was the recipient of J. J. Ebers Award, for his work with thin-film transistor and flexible/foldable electronics integration strategies.

Nathan's research and industry foresight has led to the creation of numerous companies, with a collective venture capital investment of over US$100 million. In 2022, he became a Fellow at the Royal Academy of Engineering.
