= Tso-Ping Ma =

Taiwanese-American electrical engineer (1945–2021)

- 馬佐平/马佐平
- Born: November 13, 1945; Lanzhou, Gansu, China
- Died: April 6, 2021 (aged 75); New Haven, Connecticut, U.S.
- Education: National Taiwan University (BS); Yale University (PhD)
- Scientific career
- Fields: Electrical engineering Applied physics
- Workplaces: Yale University
- Thesis: Surface States in Thick-Oxide MOS Tunnel Junctions (1974)
- Doctoral students: C. C. Wei

Tso-Ping Ma (simplified Chinese: 马佐平; traditional Chinese: 馬佐平; November 13, 1945 – April 6, 2021) was a Taiwanese-American electronic engineer and professor of electrical engineering and applied physics at Yale University.

== Early life and education ==
Tso-Ping Ma was born in Lanzhou, China in 1945, but relocated to Taiwan during the Great Retreat to escape the Chinese Civil War. After graduating from National Taiwan University in 1968, Ma completed doctoral studies in the United States, where he earned his Ph.D. from Yale University in 1974. His doctoral dissertation was titled, "Surface States in Thick-Oxide MOS Tunnel Junctions."

== Career ==
Ma joined IBM from 1975 to 1977. In 1977, he joined the Department of Electrical Engineering, Yale University as a faculty member. In 1985, he became a professor. His research focused on semiconductor devices, logic and memory technologies. At Yale, Ma held the Raymond John Wean Professorship of Electrical Engineering from 2002 and chaired the Electrical Engineering Department.

== Awards ==
Ma become an IEEE Fellow in 1994. He received the Paul Rapport Award of the IEEE Electronic Device Society in 1998. In 2003, he was elected to the US National Academy of Engineering. In 2005, he received the IEEE Andrew S. Grove Award. In 2008, he received the Connecticut Medal of Technology award. In 2009, he was elected a foreign member of the Chinese Academy of Sciences. In 2012, he was elected a member of Taiwan's Academia Sinica. In 2016, he received an honorary doctorate from National Chiao Tung University, Taiwan.

== Death ==
Ma died on April 6, 2021, at the age of 75, after a brief battle with cancer.
