= Vijay Raghunathan =

Indian-American electrical engineer

- Known for: Embedded systems; Internet of Things (IoT); System-on-Chip (SoC) design; Low-power and energy-efficient computing
- Title: Vice President and University Ambassador to India; Professor of Electrical and Computer Engineering
- Awards: IEEE Fellow (2023); IEEE/ACM Under-40 Innovators Award (2019); NSF CAREER Award (2010)

Academic background
- Education: Ph.D., University of California, Los Angeles (2006); M.S., University of California, Los Angeles (2002); B.Tech., Indian Institute of Technology Madras (2000)
- Website: https://www.cerias.purdue.edu/site/people/faculty/view/1036

Vijay Raghunathan is an Indian-American electrical engineer, researcher, and academic administrator. He is the Vice President and University Ambassador to India at Purdue University, where he also holds a professorship in Electrical and Computer Engineering and serves as Director of Semiconductor Education. Raghunathan is known for his work on low-power embedded systems and Internet of Things (IoT) devices, and he has led initiatives in semiconductor education and workforce development, including co-founding Purdue's Semiconductor Degrees Program. He was elected a Fellow of the Institute of Electrical and Electronics Engineers (IEEE) in 2024 and was appointed to the National Semiconductor Technology Center (NSTC) Workforce Advisory Board in 2025.

== Education ==
Raghunathan attended the Indian Institute of Technology Madras, where he earned a Bachelor of Technology (B.Tech.) in Electrical Engineering in 2000. During his undergraduate studies, a paper he co-authored won a best student paper award at a national conference in India. He moved to the United States for graduate studies at the University of California, Los Angeles (UCLA). He received the Outstanding Master's Student Award from the Electrical Engineering Department in 2002 and later the Edward K. Rice Outstanding Doctoral Student Award from the School of Engineering and Applied Sciences in 2005. He completed his M.S. in Electrical Engineering in 2002 and earned his Ph.D. in the same field in 2006.

== Career and research ==
In Fall 2023, Raghunathan was appointed as Purdue University's Vice President for Global Partnerships and Programs. As one of the youngest Vice Presidents at Purdue, he was charged with overseeing the university's international initiatives. He is also a Professor of Electrical and Computer Engineering at Purdue. In addition, he holds the position of Director of Semiconductor Education, leading university-level semiconductor workforce development programs that he co-founded.

=== Associate Head for Graduate and Professional Programs (2020–2023) ===
From 2020 to 2023, Raghunathan served as Associate Head for Graduate and Professional Programs in Purdue's Elmore Family School of Electrical and Computer Engineering, leading all graduate programs in the School. During his tenure, graduate enrollment grew from about 800 to nearly 1,400 students, with domestic enrollment increasing more than fourfold to comprise nearly half of the total. Over the same period, Purdue's online Master's in Electrical and Computer Engineering was ranked No. 1 nationally for three consecutive years by U.S. News & World Report, a reflection of Purdue's stated mission of excellence at scale.

Raghunathan's research focuses on the design of low-power embedded systems and Internet of Things (IoT) devices. In 2022, Raghunathan co-founded Purdue's Semiconductor Degrees Program (SDP), a university-level initiative for semiconductor workforce development. The program has been recognized as a model for semiconductor education nationally and internationally. He has also been involved in establishing international partnerships in the semiconductor sector. These collaborations include an alliance with the India Semiconductor Mission, and agreements with entities in Japan, Taiwan, Panama, South Korea, and the Dominican Republic.

Raghunathan has chaired multiple IEEE/ACM conferences and served as an Associate Editor of the ACM Transactions on Embedded Computing Systems (TECS) and the ACM Transactions on Sensor Networks (TOSN).

== Awards and recognition ==
Raghunathan was elected a Fellow of the Institute of Electrical and Electronics Engineers (IEEE) in 2024 for his contributions to the design of low-power and energy-harvesting embedded systems. His other accolades include the National Science Foundation NSF CAREER Award in 2010, and the IEEE/ACM Design Automation Conference Under-40 Innovators Award in 2019. In 2025, he was named one of the inaugural members of the Workforce Advisory Board for the National Semiconductor Technology Center (NSTC), a national body formed under the U.S. CHIPS and Science Act, one of only two academics nationwide in the country to be appointed to this national advisory board.
