= Jerry G. Fossum =

American electrical engineer (born 1943)

- Born: July 18, 1943 (age 83); Phoenix, Arizona, U.S.

Academic background
- Education: University of Arizona (BS, MS, PhD)

Academic work
- Discipline: Electrical engineering
- Sub-discipline: Semiconductor device theory Semiconductor device modeling Integrated circuit design
- Institutions: Sandia National Laboratories; University of Florida

Jerry G. Fossum (born July 18, 1943) is an American electrical engineer who is a Distinguished Professor Emeritus at the University of Florida College of Engineering.

== Early life and education ==
Fossum is a native of Phoenix, Arizona. He earned a Bachelor of Science, Master of Science, and PhD in electrical engineering from the University of Arizona.

== Career ==
Fossum worked for Sandia National Laboratories before joining the University of Florida faculty in 1978. In 1983, he was elected a fellow of the IEEE. Fossum received the J. J. Ebers Award in 2004. His scholarship focuses on the semiconductor device theory, modeling, and design.
