= Suman Datta =

Indian born American engineer

Suman Datta is an Indian-American engineer. He is a Fellow of the Institute of Electrical and Electronics Engineers and Joseph M. Pettit Chair Professor in the School of Electrical and Computer Engineering at Georgia Tech. Prior to that, he was the Stinson Professor of Nanotechnology at the University of Notre Dame. Between 2007 and 2015, he was a Full Professor of Electrical Engineering at Penn State University. He was a Principal Engineer at Intel Corporation from 1999 to 2007.

== Education ==
He studied at South Point High School, Kolkata. He received his bachelor's degree in Electrical Engineering at the Indian Institute of Technology, Kanpur, India, in 1995. He received his PhD in Electrical and Computer Engineering from the University of Cincinnati, Ohio, USA, in 1999.

== Career ==
From 1999 till 2007, he was with the Components Research division at Intel Corporation in Hillsboro, Oregon. He was a Principal Engineer in the Advanced Transistor and Nanotechnology Group at Intel. He was a member of the Intel transistor R&D team that pioneered several generations of advanced logic transistor technologies such as high-k/metal gate CMOS, non-planar Tri-gate CMOS, and strained Si/SiGe channel CMOS. He has also led many novel transistor research programs including compound semiconductor based MOSFET and Tunnel FETs. More recently, his research team has investigated phase transition solid-state devices to implement continuous-time dynamical systems and explore their applications in solving hard optimization problems in computer science.

He was a professor of Electrical Engineering at the Penn State University from 2007 to 2015. In 2013, he was named Fellow of the Institute of Electrical and Electronics Engineers (IEEE) in 2013 for his contributions to high-performance advanced silicon and compound semiconductor transistor technologies. In 2016, he was named Fellow of the National Academy of Inventors in recognition of his inventions that have made a tangible impact on quality of life, economic development and the welfare of society.

As of December 2025, he has authored or co-authored over 850 publications in journals, conferences and granted patents and 43,000 citations.

== Awards ==
He has received prestigious awards, including the 2026 IEEE Andrew S. Grove Award ("for contributions to and leadership in high-performance and energy-efficient logic transistor research"), the 2024 SRC/SIA University Research Award, and several best paper awards, alongside recognition for his impactful work on advanced logic transistors, such as the 2022 Test of Time Award of the IEEE Symposium on VLSI Technology & Circuits for his 2006 foundational research on FinFETs ("the first demonstration of FinFETs combined with the other two boosters – uniaxial strained silicon and high-k/metal gate, a combination that would later dominate the industry").

== Personal life ==
He is married to Anjuli Datta and they have two children, Rajeev and Tanya. Anjuli is a Teaching Full Professor in the School of Biological Sciences at Georgia Tech. Rajeev recently graduated from Caltech and pursuing his PhD in the field of computer vision at Cornell University, while Tanya is a junior in Computer Engineering at Cornell University.
