= Ben G. Streetman =

- Scientific career
- Fields: Semiconductor physics, Microelectronics
- Website: www.ece.utexas.edu/people/faculty/ben-streetman

Ben G. Streetman is the former dean of the Cockrell School of Engineering at the University of Texas at Austin. He earned a Ph.D. in electrical engineering from Texas in 1966, and became a professor there in 1982. He founded the university's Microelectronics Research Center and holds the Dula D. Cockrell Centennial Chair Emeritus in Engineering. Streetman is a member of the American Academy of Arts and Sciences and the National Academy of Engineering. He is a fellow of the Institute of Electrical and Electronics Engineers (IEEE) and the Electrochemical Society. He was awarded the IEEE Education Medal in 1989.

Streetman's academic focus is on semiconductor materials and devices. He is the co-author of Solid State Electronic Devices, along with Dr. Sanjay Banerjee, and author of over 290 articles.

Streetman helped start a workshop on molecular-beam epitaxy (MBE), which is now an annual conference known as NAMBE (North American Conference on Molecular Beam Epitaxy).
