= Sayeef Salahuddin =

Bangladeshi-American electrical engineer and materials scientist

- Born: Bangladesh
- Education: Bangladesh University of Engineering and Technology (B.Sc., 2003); Purdue University (Ph.D., 2007)
- Known for: Negative capacitance in ferroelectric materials
- Awards: PECASE (2013); IEEE Fellow (2019); APS Fellow; AAAS Fellow (2023); IEEE Andrew S. Grove Award (2025); APS James C. McGroddy Prize for New Materials (2026)
- Scientific career
- Fields: Electrical engineering; Materials science; Nanoelectronics
- Workplaces: University of California, Berkeley; Lawrence Berkeley National Laboratory
- Website: www2.eecs.berkeley.edu/Faculty/Homepages/salahuddin.html

Sayeef Salahuddin is a Bangladeshi-American electrical engineer. He is the TSMC Distinguished Professor of Electrical Engineering and Computer Sciences at the University of California, Berkeley, and a faculty senior scientist in the Materials Sciences Division of Lawrence Berkeley National Laboratory. His research concerns negative capacitance in ferroelectric materials and its use in low-power transistor and memory devices. He is a fellow of the IEEE, the American Physical Society, and the American Association for the Advancement of Science. He also co-founded the startup Sonera Magnetics, acquired by Apple Inc. in 2026.

== Early life and education ==
Salahuddin received a B.Sc. in electrical and electronic engineering from the Bangladesh University of Engineering and Technology in 2003, and a PhD in electrical and computer engineering from Purdue University in 2007. As a graduate student he co-authored, with Supriyo Datta, a 2008 paper proposing the use of negative capacitance in ferroelectric materials to amplify transistor gate voltage.

== Career ==
Salahuddin joined the UC Berkeley faculty in 2008 and became the TSMC Distinguished Professor of Electrical Engineering and Computer Sciences. He co-directs the Berkeley Device Modeling Center and the Berkeley Center for Negative Capacitance Transistors, and is an associate director of ASCENT, a DARPA/Semiconductor Research Corporation device-technology center. He served on the editorial board of IEEE Electron Devices Letters (2013–2016) and later became its editor-in-chief. In 2025 he was named to the inaugural technical advisory board of the U.S. National Semiconductor Technology Center, operated by Natcast under the CHIPS and Science Act.

=== Sonera Magnetics ===
In 2018, Salahuddin's graduate student Dominic Labanowski and co-founder Nishita Deka launched Sonera Magnetics, a Berkeley startup developing solid-state magnetic sensors aimed at making functional brain imaging (magnetoencephalography) cheaper and more portable than conventional superconducting-sensor systems, with applications also explored in muscle sensing. The pair "teamed up with Labanowski's Ph.D. advisor, Sayeef Salahuddin ... to launch Sonera Magnetics in 2018." In September 2026 it was reported that Apple Inc. had acquired the company in a deal that closed that May.

== Research ==
Salahuddin's work centers on device physics for low-power electronic and spintronic devices, particularly negative capacitance in ferroelectric materials as a way to reduce transistor operating voltage below conventional thermodynamic limits. His 2008 paper with Datta proposed the underlying mechanism; later work with collaborators reported experimental evidence of negative capacitance in ferroelectric capacitors , though the lack of accurate physical models,and on scaling hafnium- and zirconium-oxide ferroelectric films for transistor and memory applications, including films only a few atomic layers thick.

== Awards and honors ==
- Presidential Early Career Award for Scientists and Engineers, 2013, through the National Science Foundation.
- IEEE Fellow, 2019, "for contributions to low power electronic and spintronic devices."
- Fellow, American Physical Society.
- Fellow, American Association for the Advancement of Science, 2023 class, "for distinguished contributions to electronic device science and engineering, in particular for inventing negative capacitance devices with potential for dramatic increases in energy efficiency in computing."
- IEEE Andrew S. Grove Award, 2025, "for pioneering contributions to physics of ferroelectrics and integrated ferroelectric devices."
- APS James C. McGroddy Prize for New Materials, 2026, "for the discovery of ferroelectricity in ultra thin hafnium based oxides and their implementation in microelectronic devices."

== Selected publications ==
- Salahuddin, Sayeef; Datta, Supriyo (2008). "Use of Negative Capacitance to Provide Voltage Amplification for Low Power Nanoscale Devices". Nano Letters. 8 (2): 405–410. doi:10.1021/nl071804g.
- Khan, Asif Islam; et al. (2015). "Negative capacitance in a ferroelectric capacitor". Nature Materials. 14 (2): 182–186. doi:10.1038/nmat4148.
- Cheema, Suraj S.; et al. (2022). "Emergent ferroelectricity in subnanometer binary oxide films on silicon". Science. 376 (6593): 648–652. doi:10.1126/science.abm8642.
