= James T. Clemens =

American theoretical physicist

James T. Clemens (born 1943 in Brooklyn, New York) is an American theoretical physicist.

== Education and career ==
Dr. Clemens did his undergraduate studies at the Polytechnic Institute of Brooklyn, graduating in 1965 with a B.S. degree, magna cum laude in physics. After finishing his theoretical doctorate in collective modeling of nuclear structures in 1969, also at the Polytechnic Institute, he was employed by AT&T Bell Laboratories in Allentown, Pa. His research and development activities in the Allentown facility, were primarily focused on the research of materials for silicon based integrated circuits and he became responsible for all Silicon Gate MOS Technologies introduced into manufacture in the Allentown manufacturing facility.

In 1983 he transferred to the Central Research Laboratory in Murray Hill, New Jersey and headed all major lithographic research and development activities. His group developed the first excimer laser projection step and repeat printer.

In 1990, he was appointed to be the Technical Program Manager for the joint AT&T Bell Labs and NEC Corp. Joint Research and Development Program in Silicon based VLSI circuits. The program ended in 1999. Clemens and his team received the Bell Laboratories Gold Level Quality Award for the program.

== Awards and honors ==
Clemens was elected a fellow of the IEEE in 1987 "for contributions to the field of MOS fundamental device physics and its application to the development of VLSI integrated circuit technology". He was the 1999 recipient of the J J Ebers Award "for fundamental contributions to MOS VLSI electron devices".
