= IEEE Electron Device Letters =

- Discipline: Electronics engineering
- Language: English
- Edited by: Sayeef Salahuddin

Publication details
- History: 1980-present
- Publisher: IEEE
- Frequency: Monthly
- Impact factor: 4.1 (2023)

Standard abbreviations
- ISO 4: IEEE Electron Device Lett.

Indexing
- CODEN: EDLEDZ
- ISSN: 0741-3106 (print); 1558-0563 (web)
- LCCN: 499741646
- OCLC no.: 81643614

Links
- Journal homepage; Online access; Online archive

IEEE Electron Device Letters is a peer-reviewed scientific journal published monthly by the IEEE. It was founded in 1980 by IEEE Electron Devices Society. The journal covers the advances in electron and ion integrated circuit devices. Its editor-in-chief is Sayeef Salahuddin (University of California, Berkeley).

According to the Journal Citation Reports, the journal has a 2023 impact factor of 4.1.
