= Sanjay Banerjee =

American engineer

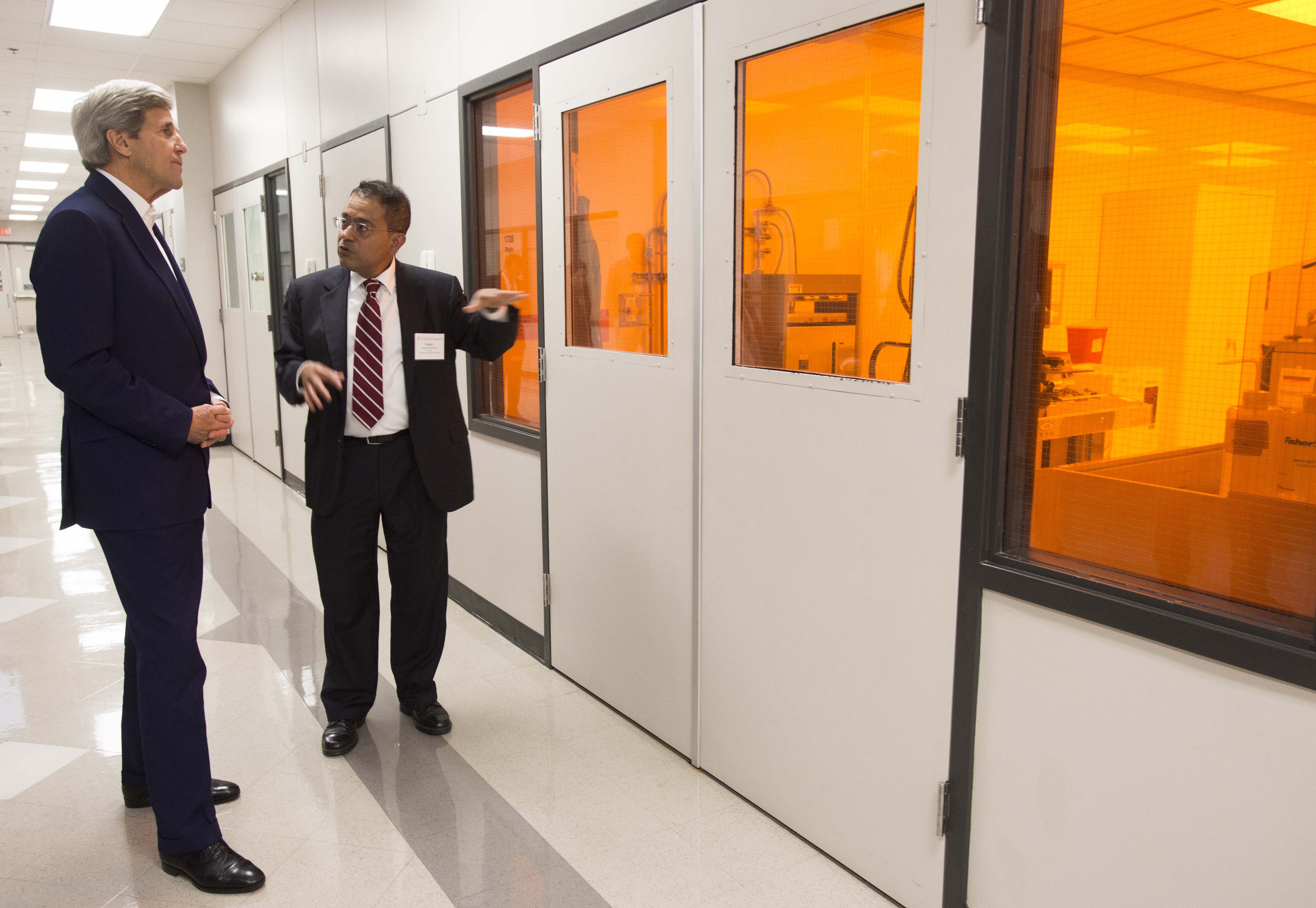
- Professor Sanjay Banerjee discusses his work at the Microelectronics Research Center with former Secretary of State John Kerry (April 2016).
- Education: University of Illinois at Urbana-Champaign (Ph.D.); Indian Institute of Technology Kharagpur (B.Tech.)
- Awards: 2014 IEEE Andrew S. Grove Award; 2003 Electrochemical Society Thomas D. Callinan Award; 2000 IEEE Millennium Medal; 1988 National Science Foundation Presidential Young Investigator Award
- Scientific career
- Fields: Electrical Engineering
- Workplaces: University of Texas at Austin
- Doctoral advisor: Ben G. Streetman
- Website: banerjeelab.mer.utexas.edu

Sanjay Banerjee is an American engineer at the University of Texas at Austin, Microelectronics Research Center which he directed from Sept. 1999-Jan. 2025, and director of the Southwest Academy of Nanoelectronics (SWAN) from 2006-2018 — one of three such centers in the United States funded by the Semiconductor Research Corporation to develop a replacement for MOSFETs as part of their Nanoelectronics Research Initiative (NRI).

== Career ==
Banerjee has supervised over 80 Ph.D. students and 70 M.S. students at the University of Texas, where he is the Cockrell Family Regents Chair Professor in Electrical and Computer Engineering.

=== Research ===
In 1986, he was awarded Best Paper at the IEEE International Solid State Circuits Conference for work on polysilicon transistors and dynamic random access trench memory cells used by Texas Instruments in the world's first 4 Megabit DRAM. He demonstrated the first three-terminal MOS tunnel FET as well as the first high-k dielectric/silicon-germanium quantum dot gates for flash memory. He is active in the areas of beyond CMOS nanoelectronic transistors based on 2D materials and spintronics, fabrication and modeling of advanced MOSFETs, and solar cells.

== Publications ==
He has over 1250 archival refereed journal publications and conference talks, and he holds 35 U.S. patents. He is co-author with former Dean of the Cockrell School of Engineering Ben G. Streetman of the textbook Solid State Electronic Devices, currently in its 7th edition.

== Honors and awards ==
Banerjee was elected Fellow of the Institute of Electrical and Electronics Engineers in 1996, Fellow of the American Physical Society in 2006, Fellow of the American Association for the Advancement of Science in 2007, and Fellow of the National Academy of Inventors in 2021. His awards include the 2017 Semiconductor Industry Association/SRC University Researcher Award, the 2014 IEEE Andrew S. Grove Award, the 2008 Cockrell School of Engineering Billy and Claude R. Hocott Distinguished Centennial Engineering Research Award, the 2005 Indian Institute of Technology Kharagpur Distinguished Alumnus Award, 2004 Industry R&D Award (with R.Singh), the 2003 Electrochemical Society Thomas D. Callinan Award, the 2000 IEEE Millennium Medal, and the 1988 National Science Foundation Presidential Young Investigator Award for high speed optoelectronic devices and VLSI structures by laser enhanced molecular beam epitaxy.
