= Gurtej Sandhu =

Indian-American inventor and semiconductor technologist

Gurtej Singh Sandhu
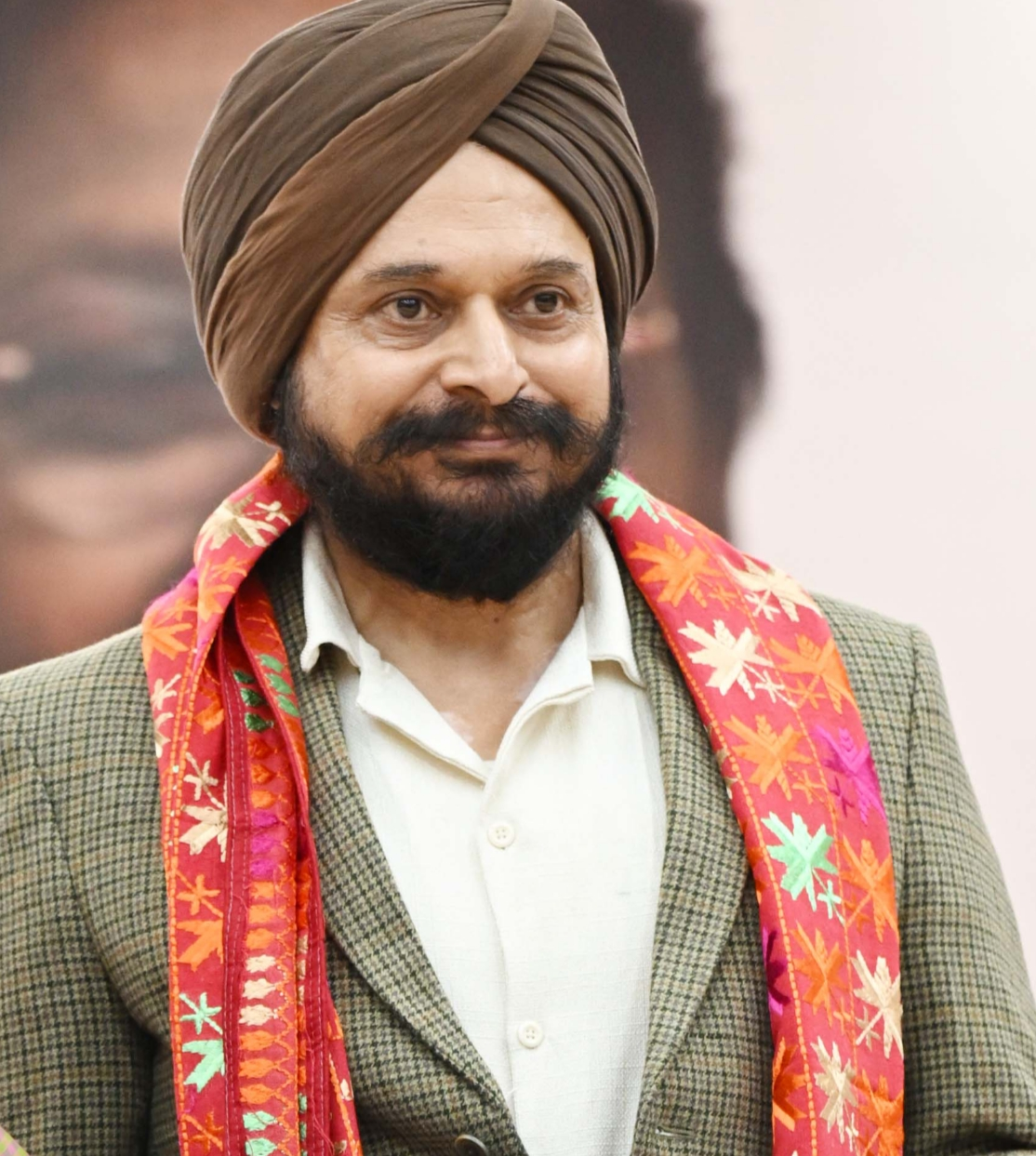
- Sandhu in 2025
- Born: 24 October 1960 (age 65); London, England
- Citizenship: United States
- Education: Guru Nanak Dev University (MSc); IIT Delhi (M.Tech); University of North Carolina at Chapel Hill (PhD)
- Known for: Inventions
- Scientific career
- Workplaces: Micron Technology

Gurtej Singh Sandhu (born 24 October 1960) is an American inventor and semiconductor technologist who is widely recognized for his pioneering contributions to computer memory and solid-state storage.

Sandhu currently serves as Principal Fellow and Vice President at Micron Technology, where he has worked since 1990. Sandhu is among the world’s most prolific inventors, holding over 2,211 patents worldwide and 1,432 within the U.S., surpassing Thomas Edison’s record.

== Early life and education ==
Gurtej Singh Sandhu was born on 24 October 1960 in London to Indian Sikh parents. Both of his parents were PhD graduates from the University of London. Sandhu was raised in Amritsar, India, where his father was a chemistry professor at the Guru Nanak Dev University.

Influenced by his parents, Sandhu earned a Master of Science (Honours) in Physics from Guru Nanak Dev University, followed by a Master of Technology in Electrical Engineering from the Indian Institute of Technology, Delhi. He moved to the United States, where he earned a Ph.D. in Physics from the University of North Carolina at Chapel Hill, graduating in 1990.

== Technical contributions ==
Sandhu’s early breakthrough at Micron involved developing a titanium coating process for microchips that prevented oxygen exposure, a technique now widely adopted in memory-chip production.

His innovations span several key processes in semiconductor manufacturing, including Atomic Layer Deposition (ALD) of high-κ films for DRAM, pitch-doubling techniques for NAND flash scaling, and CVD Ti/TiN processes still used in DRAM and NAND fabrication. These advancements have enabled the continuation of Moore’s Law for memory chips and have been foundational to advanced patterning and materials integration.

== Awards and recognition ==
Sandhu received the IEEE Andrew S. Grove Award in 2018 for outstanding contributions to solid-state devices and technology, and is a Fellow of the IEEE. He has also been honored with a Distinguished Alumni Award from IIT Delhi. As of 2024, he is recognized among the world’s top inventors for his extensive patent portfolio.

== Personal life ==
Sandhu resides in Boise, Idaho, and is known for his humility and mentorship of young engineers.

He enjoys sports such as basketball and table tennis, and emphasizes that innovation often extends beyond patents, with many breakthroughs retained as trade secrets. He is also active in philanthropy, supporting educational initiatives and contributing to thought leadership in semiconductor scaling through keynote talks and IEEE Spectrum interviews.
