= Mark Law (electrical engineer) =

American electrical engineer

- Education: Iowa State University; Stanford University
- Occupation: Electrical engineer

Mark Law is an American electrical engineer. He is a distinguished professor in the department of electrical and computer engineering at the University of Florida.

Law attended Iowa State University where he earned his Bachelor of Science degree. He then attended Stanford University where he earned his Master of Science and Doctor of Philosophy degrees. Law was director the University of Florida honors program from 2014 to 2022.

== Awards and recognition ==
Dr. Law was named an IEEE Fellow in 1998 for his contributions to integrated circuit process modeling and simulation. He has also won a number of awards:

Year	Award	Result	Ref
1993	Semiconductor Research Corporation SRC Technical Excellence Award	Won	
2006	Semiconductor Research Corporation SRC Aristotle Award	Won	
2010	IEEE EDS J. J. Ebers Award	Won	
2013	Semiconductor Industry Association (SIA) University Research Award	Won	
2013	SEMI North America award	Won	
