= Eugene Fitzgerald =

American scientist

Eugene A. Fitzgerald is an American materials scientist and engineer currently the Merton C. Flemings-SMA Professor of Materials Science and Engineering at Massachusetts Institute of Technology.
