= Hsu Su-ming =

Taiwanese pathologist

Hsu Su-ming (Chinese: 許世明; pinyin: Xǔ Shìmíng; born 28 January 1949) is a Taiwanese pathologist.

Hsu studied medicine at National Taiwan University and split his residency between National Taiwan University Hospital and Rhode Island Hospital. He remained in the United States, first working for the National Institutes of Health, then teaching at the University of Texas Health Science Center at Houston and later the University of Arkansas for Medical Sciences. He returned to Taiwan in 1995 to teach at NTU. From 1985, Hsu was an ISI highly cited researcher.
