= Tsunenobu Kimoto =

Tsunenobu Kimoto, from Kyoto University in Japan, was named Fellow of the Institute of Electrical and Electronics Engineers (IEEE) in 2015 for contributions to silicon carbide materials and devices.
