= Cindy Kao =

Human computer interaction researcher

Cindy Hsin-Liu Kao
- 高新綠
- Kao in 2022
- Born: Taiwan
- Other name: Hsin-Liu Kao
- Occupations: Computer Scientist, Designer & Associate Professor at Cornell University
- Website: https://www.hybridbody.human.cornell.edu/cindyhlkao

Cindy Hsin-Liu Kao (Chinese: 高新綠; pinyin: Gāo Xīnlǜ) is a Taiwanese-American professor, computer science researcher and interdisciplinary designer based at Cornell University focusing on human-centered design, computer science, and wearable technologies. She is the founder and director of Cornell University's Hybrid Body Lab, a transdisciplinary research laboratory focusing on integrating cultural and social perspectives into the design of on-body interfaces. Through her research, Kao aims to foster inclusive designs for soft wearable technologies. Kao was awarded the 2021 National Science Foundation CAREER Award and SXSW Interactive Innovation Award for her wearable research technologies, along with over a dozen design awards. Kao and her lab have also won numerous Best Paper Honors from the Association of Computing Machinery (ACM). Her work has been mentioned in Forbes, CNN, TIME, and WIRED. Kao was selected as the 2026-2027 Carl and Lily Pforzheimer Foundation Fellow at the Harvard Radcliffe Institute for Advanced Study.

== Education ==
In 2011, Kao attended the National Taiwan University and received a B.S. in Computer Science and a B.B.A. in Technology Management. In 2013, Kao continued her education at the National Taiwan University and graduated with a M.S. in Computer Science. In 2018, Kao attended the Massachusetts Institute of Technology (MIT), earning a Ph.D. in Media Arts and Sciences from the MIT Media Lab.

== Career ==
After publishing her research about NailO – a technology focused on using the fingernail as a site for wearable technology – at the MIT Media Lab, Kao became an intern at Microsoft Research in the summer of 2015. That summer, Kao initiated and lead a project focused on the creation of tattoo antennas with the capability of being read by NFC tag readers within smartphones. Kao continued this tattoo antenna project at the MIT Media Lab in the fall of 2015 where she was a PhD researcher, and in 2016 expanding it into a novel fabrication approach for creating a jewelry-like interactive temporary tattoo called DuoSkin. DuoSkin received viral media attention and numerous accolades due to its unique convergence of emerging on-skin technology, fashion, and human-centered design. DuoSkin expanded public interest in the potential of smart tattoos. Forbes described DuoSkin as: "This tattoo is temporary, but it’s permanently changed people’s impressions of wearable tech."

Kao currently holds the position of tenured associate professor in Human-Centered Design at Cornell University, with additional graduate field faculty appointments in Information Science and Electrical & Computer Engineering. She is also the founder and director of Cornell University's Hybrid Body Lab, a research laboratory dedicated to the exploration of on-body interfaces. Kao has worked on the development of a research practice known as Hybrid Body Craft, an approach for blending cultural and social perspectives into the design of on-body interfaces. Her goal is to create designs for next generation wearable technology that may reflect (instead of constrict) the uniqueness of individual identities.

In 2021, Kao founded the Hybrid Body Lab Artist-in-Residence (AiR) Program. The goal of the AiR is to invite on-body artists, such as tattoo, makeup, hair and nail artists, to collaborate and leverage the on-body technology developed by the Hybrid Body Lab into their artistic practices. The goal is to enable perspectives beyond STEM for the development of next generation wearable technology.

Kao was awarded the National Science Foundation CAREER Award in 2021 for her project focusing on the advancement of on-skin interfaces, such as smart tattoos and bandages.

== Awards ==
In 2016, Kao was awarded the Silver A'Design Award Winner in the Wearable Technologies Design Category, given to the top 5% percentile of participants.

In 2017, Kao's work were recognized as a finalist for the Fast Company's Innovation by Design Award. Kao received a nomination for the Ars Electronica STARTS Prize. She was also awarded the SXSW Interactive Innovation Award for her research technologies.

In addition to her design awards, Kao and her lab's research have been awarded over a dozen Best Paper Honors from the Association of Computing Machinery (ACM). This includes Best Paper Awards (given to top 1% percentile of submissions) at top-tier computer science venues such as ACM CHI, ACM UbiComp, ACM UIST, and ACM DIS.

Kao was awarded the National Science Foundation CAREER Award in 2021 for her project on "On-Skin Interface Prototyping Toolkits: Democratizing Next Generation Wearable Computing."

== Exhibitions ==
In 2017, Kao's work was featured on the New York Fashion Week Runway, showcasing the fusion of technology and fashion. In 2019, Kao's work was displayed at the Pompidou Centre in Paris. That same year, the Seattle Museum of Pop Culture exhibited Kao's work in its "A Queen Within: Adorned Archetypes" exhibition, organized by Barrett Barrera Projects and curated by MUSEEA. In 2020, Kao's contributions were showcased at a joint exhibition titled "human (un)limited" in Beijing that was hosted by hosted by Hyundai Motorstudio and Ars Electronica.
