= Tak H. Ning =

American professor of electrical engineering

Tak Hung Ning is an American physicist.

Ning earned a Bachelor of Arts in physics from Reed College in 1967, and continued his studies in the field at the University of Illinois Urbana-Champaign, completing a Master of Science in 1968, followed by a PhD in 1971. He remained at UIUC as an assistant professor within the electrical and computer engineering department before joining IBM's Thomas J. Watson Research Center as a research scientist in 1973.

Ning was elected a fellow of the IEEE in 1987. The IEEE honored him with the J. J. Ebers Award two years later. He was named an IBM Fellow in 1991. In 1993, Ning was elected a member of the National Academy of Engineering. He is a 1997 fellow of the American Physical Society.
