= Tsuhan Chen =

Chen Tsuhan is the Deputy President (Research and Technology) at the National University of Singapore. He is currently the Chief Scientist of AI Singapore. Prior to his current appoint he was the Dean of the College of Engineering at Nanyang Technological University from 2015 to 2017. He was previously Director of the School of Electrical and Computer Engineering at Cornell University from 2009 to 2013.

Chen was educated at National Taiwan University and the California Institute of Technology; at Caltech, his adviser was P. P. Vaidyanathan. He won the Charles Wilts Doctoral Prize for his 1993 Ph.D. thesis on filters. Prior to joining Cornell, he worked for Bell Labs from 1993 to 1997 and as a professor at Carnegie Mellon University from 1997 to 2009. He was the editor-in-chief of the IEEE Transactions on Multimedia from 2002 to 2004, and was elected as a Fellow of the IEEE in 2007.

Chen's research interests include signal processing and multimedia. His research projects have included systems for three-dimensional photography for automated analysis of security video footage, and for gesture-based control of vehicle functions.
