= Jiun-Huei Proty Wu =

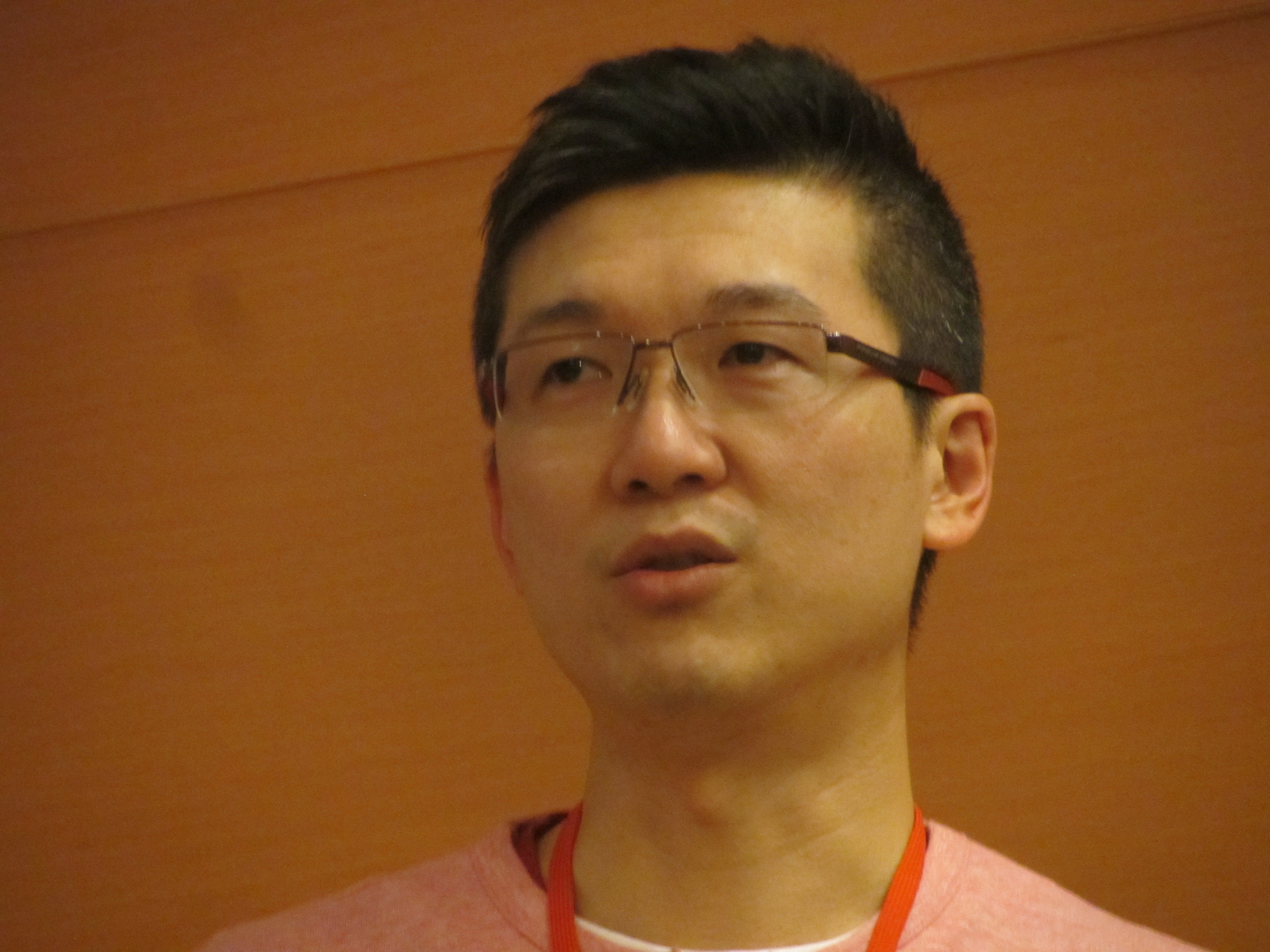
- Jiun-Huei Proty Wu in 2014
- Born: 1970 (age 55–56); Taichung, Taiwan
- Education: PhD, University of Cambridge; MSc, Sussex University; BSc, National Taiwan University
- Known for: Cosmology research; Telescope making
- Awards: 2014 Outstanding Young Scholar Project, Ministry of Science and Technology; 2013 Silver Medal, World Chinese Award for Popular Science; 2012 Excellence Award for Social Service, National Taiwan University; 2011 Outstanding Senior Professor, National Taiwan University
- Scientific career
- Fields: Cosmology
- Workplaces: Professor, National Taiwan University; Deputy Vice President for International Affairs, National Taiwan University; Advisory Panelist, Ministry of Science and Technology; Joint Researcher, Institute of Astronomy and Astrophysics, Academia Sinica (ASIAA)

Jiun-Huei Proty Wu is a cosmologist in Taiwan. He is currently on secondment serving as the Director of UK Office for Ministry of Science and Technology, Taiwan. Previously he was the Deputy Vice President for International Affairs, National Taiwan University. He is a tenured professor at Physics Department and Institute of Astrophysics, National Taiwan University, a Joint Researcher, Institute of Astronomy and Astrophysics, Academia Sinica, and an adjunct professor, Institute of Physics, National Chengchi University. He also promotes telescope-DIY and 3D film making.

== Life and career ==
Jiun-Huei Proty Wu was born in 1970. His mother, Shu-Meei Chang, is a retired professor in art and an oil painter. He grew up in Taichung, Taiwan, and received his BSc in physics from National Taiwan University in 1993. He then spent two years in Navy for the mandatory military service. After that, he moved to United Kingdom for advanced studies and received an MSc in astronomy with distinction from Sussex University in 1996, under the supervision of Andrew Liddle. He then obtained a PhD in cosmology under the supervision of Paul Shellard at Prof. Stephen Hawking's Relativity and Gravitation Group at DAMTP, University of Cambridge in 1999. During the PhD years, he won the J.T.Knight Prize, and the thesis title is 'Cosmological Perturbations from Cosmic Strings'. He then started working at U.C.Berkeley as a KDI Fellow, jointly appointed by NASA as a Long-Term Space Astronomer. He participated and led a few papers in the projects MAXIMA and MAXIPOL.

He joined the faculty of Physics Department at National Taiwan University in 2001, and is currently a professor in both the Physics Department and Institute of Astrophysics. He is also the Project Scientist of AMiBA, a cosmological telescope based in Hawaii and funded by Ministry of Education and Ministry of Science and Technology. In addition, he is a Joint Researcher at Institute of Astronomy and Astrophysics, Academia Sinica (ASIAA), and an adjunct professor at National Chengchi University. He was a visiting scholar at U.C. Berkeley, LBNL, UMN, and Fermilab. Between 2010 and 2011, he was the Chief Editor of Physics Bimonthly, a major journal of the Physics Society Taiwan. Between 2012 and 2014, he was a Review Panelist (as Chair in Astrophysics) at Ministry of Science and Technology (MOST). Since 2015, he has been the Advisory Panelist, Ministry of Science and Technology. Since 2014, he has been the Deputy Vice President for International Affairs, National Taiwan University. He is also the President of Cambridge Society Taiwan.

Since 2003, he has been serving in the national committee for the student selection and training for the International Physics Olympiad (IPhO), and has been participating in the IPhO leading the Taiwan team almost every year since. He has been serving the same role for the Intel International Science and Engineering Fairs (Intel ISEF). He is also a two-time Taiwan representative giving invited talks in the Intel ISEF Educator Academy (held every other year) to share the Taiwanese experience in education. He has been a high-school textbook writer in natural sciences (for age 12–18) since 2003 and has been serving on the exam board for national entry exams for universities.

== Research ==
His general research interest is in cosmology, in particular the cosmic strings, loop quantum gravity, cosmic microwave background, cosmic topology, dark energy, and applications using machine learning. He has expertise in telescope making, and designed the largest and the second largest home-designed observatories in Taiwan. He also owns a few patents related to optics, including applications in light-field camera and 3D visualization. These are widely applied in digital cameras and cell phones. He also designed the largest 3D planetarium in Taiwan, providing self-made 3D films related to astrophysics and cosmology.

Jiun-Huei Proty Wu is also an expert in I-Ching, the ancient Chinese philosophy dated back to around five thousand years ago. Between 1989 and 1992, he first official took the courses given by Prof. Cheng-He Yang (楊政河) at Institute of Philosophy, National Taiwan University, and then learned further applied skills under Prof. Yang's supervision. In 1996, he read the palm and evaluated the birth date of Prof. Stephen Hawking, in a spirit of checking the value of such ancient theory.

== Popular science ==
Jiun-Huei Proty Wu made his first two telescopes at the age of 12. He used them to image Halley's Comet in 1986. He started promoting the self-making of telescopes in 2003, and in the past years more than three thousands of telescopes have been made through the national camps that he conducted. He also led the projects of building the largest and the second largest observatories in Taiwan. With these contributions, he won the Excellence Award for Social Service, National Taiwan University, in 2012, and the Silver Medal of the first World Chinese Award for Popular Science in 2013. He is also the first TED speaker from National Taiwan University, delivering an 18-minute talk in the 2011 annual meeting organized by TEDxTaipei then the co-curator of the 2012 annual meeting, and the co-host for the TED Global-Taiwan 2013. He is a council member of TEDxTaipei. Since 2011, he has been a columnist of BBC Knowledge (International Chinese Edition), a monthly journal for popular science. In 2017 he co-hosted the NASA Hackathon (Space Apps Challenge) in Taiwan. The champion team of Taiwan, SpaceBar, then won the Global Winner for Best Use of Data. He led the team for an invited trip to watch the rocket launch at NASA in August 2017. In 2018 and 2019 he continued to serve as a Taipei lead judge and the coach of the Taipei representative teams.
