= Chu Kwo-ray =

Taiwanese plasma physicist (born 1942)

Chu Kwo-ray (Chinese: 朱國瑞; born 10 October 1942) is a Taiwanese plasma physicist.

== Life and career ==
Chu was born on 10 October 1942. He pursued a Bachelor of Science degree from National Taiwan University, graduating in 1965. He then obtained a master's of science in the same subject at the University of Massachusetts in 1968. He completed a doctorate in applied physics at Cornell University in 1973.

Chu subsequently worked for the Science Applications International Corporation until 1978, when he joined the United States Naval Research Laboratory. He returned to Taiwan in September 1983 to accept a professorship within the physics department at National Tsing Hua University. In 2010, Kuo became a distinguished chair professor of the National Taiwan University Department of Physics.

Chu's honors and awards include election as fellow of the American Physical Society in 1983, and IEEE in 1997, membership within Academia Sinica in 2002, and receiving a Presidential Science Prize in 2003.
