= Che-Chia Wei =

Taiwanese executive and electrical engineer

C. C. Wei
- 魏哲家
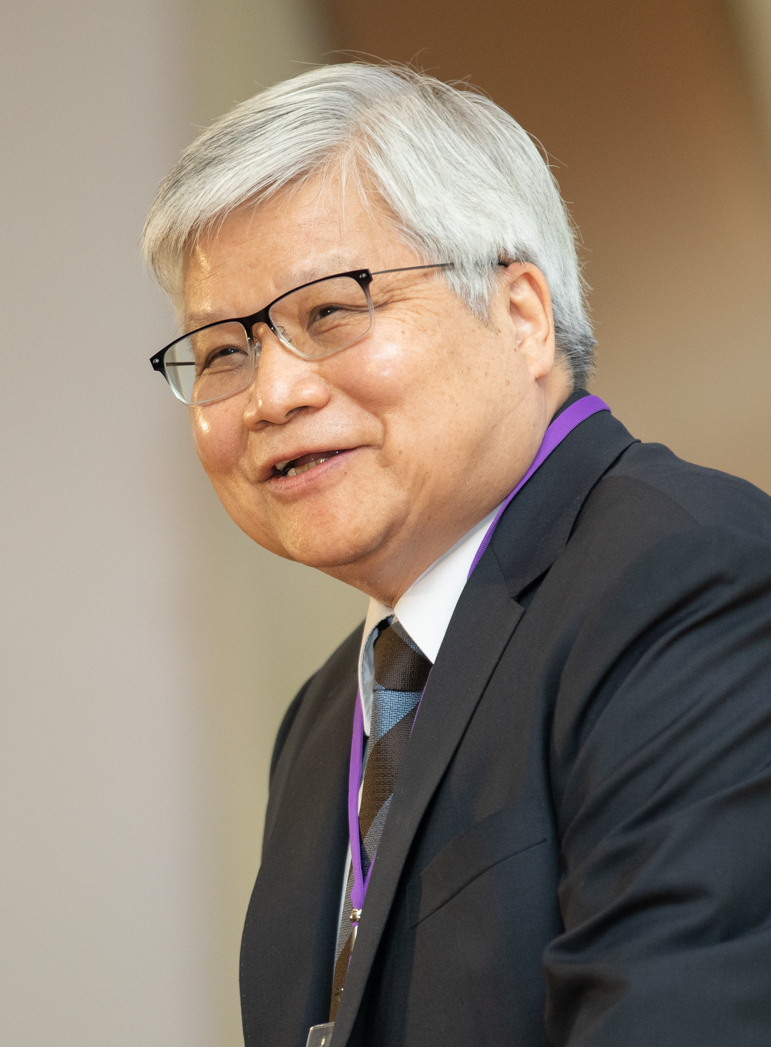
- Wei in 2020
- Born: 1953 (age 72–73); Nantou County, Taiwan
- Education: National Chiao Tung University (BS, MS); Yale University (PhD)
- Title: President, CEO, and chairman of TSMC
- Scientific career
- Fields: Electrical engineering
- Thesis: RF Plasma Damage in MOS Structures (1985)
- Doctoral advisor: Tso-Ping Ma

Che-Chia Wei (Chinese: 魏哲家; pinyin: Wèi Zhéjiā; born 1953) is a Taiwanese electrical engineer and business executive who is the president, chairman, and chief executive officer (CEO) of Taiwan Semiconductor Manufacturing Company Limited (TSMC).

== Early life and education ==
Wei was born Lugu Township, Nantou County, Taiwan, in 1953. When he was in elementary school, his family moved to Taichung, where he attended Taichung Municipal First Senior High School.

After high school, Wei graduated from National Chiao Tung University with a bachelor's degree in electrical engineering and a master's degree in electrical engineering. He then completed doctoral studies in the U.S., earning his Ph.D. in electrical engineering from Yale University in 1985. His doctoral dissertation, completed under the supervision of professor Tso-Ping Ma, was titled, "RF Plasma Damage in MOS Structures".

== Career ==
After receiving his doctorate, Wei joined Texas Instruments as a member of its research and development technical staff. He later served as senior manager for logic and SRAM technology development at STMicroelectronics, and then as senior vice president of technology at Charter Semiconductor Manufacturing Co.

On February 2, 1998, he was named as a vice-president of TSMC. He became the company's CEO in 2018 and succeeded Mark Liu as TSMC's chairman in June 2024.

He has been a member of the TSMC board of directors since 2017. He is also a fellow of the Industrial Technology Research Institute.

In September 2024, Wei was named by Time as one of the 100 most influential people in artificial intelligence.

== Personal life ==
Wei is married to Jessica N. Wei.
