= Chun-Hway Hsueh =

Taiwanese materials scientist

Chun-Hway Hsueh (Chinese: 薛承輝) is a Taiwanese materials scientist.

== Education and career ==
Hsueh studied physics at National Taiwan University, then switched to materials science as a graduate student at National Tsing Hua University and the University of California, Berkeley. He began working for Oak Ridge National Laboratory in 1986. In 2002, he was listed as an ISI highly cited researcher in materials science. Hsueh returned to Taiwan in 2008 to teach at National Taiwan University, and was appointed to a distinguished professorship within the school's Department of Materials Science and Engineering in 2010. He has served as associate editor for several academic journals. Hsueh was the 2019 recipient of the Taiwan Ceramic Society's Ceramic Industry Award.
