= I Lo-fen =

Taiwanese scholar and writer

I Lo-fen (Chinese: 衣若芬; pinyin: Yi Ruofen; born 26 October 1964, in Taipei) is a scholar and writer, originally from Taipei, Taiwan, and currently residing in Singapore. She holds a Ph.D. in Chinese Literature from National Taiwan University. Dr. I has previously served as a part-time lecturer at Tamkang University and National Taiwan University, an Associate Professor in the Department of Chinese Language and Literature at Fu Jen Catholic University, and an Associate Research Fellow at the Institute of Chinese Literature and Philosophy, Academia Sinica. Since 2006, she has been an Associate Professor in the Chinese Programme at Nanyang Technological University, Singapore.

Dr. I is a regular columnist for Singapore’s Lianhe Zaobao. She is the founder and current president of the Text and Image Studies Society, a registered association in Singapore. She also serves as a board member of the China Su Shi Studies Association, an academic advisory committee member at the San Su Culture Research Institute of Sichuan Normal University, and an international board member of the Academic Association of Global Cultural Contents in Korea.

She has published 13 academic monographs and edited or co-edited 12 scholarly volumes. Her journal and book articles number over 160. In addition to her academic work, she has published 18 volumes of fiction and essays. Dr. I is recognized as the first woman in history, both ancient and modern, to retrace the journey of Su Dongpo (Su Shi).

== Awards ==
- John Cheung Social Media Award. NTU, Singapore (2023)
- Koh Boon Hwee Scholars Award of Nanyang Technological University (2019)
- Singapore National Arts Council Publication Award (2015)
- Academia Sinica Research Award for Junior Research Investigators (2004)
- Wu Da-You Foundation Award (2004)
- Sichuan Provincial Government Exceptional Academic Works Award (Co-author of The History of Su Shi Studies (苏轼研究史)) (2003)
- Taiwan National Science Council Research Grant Award (1996-2002, award was discontinued after 2002)
- Taiwan Government Information Office Best Book Award (Co-editor of Van Gogh, O! Van Gogh (梵谷噢！梵谷！) with Ho Kung-shang, 1998)
- Hsueh Ming Min Academic Works Award, Outstanding (1989, 1994)
- Modern Poetry Writing Award, Department of Chinese Studies, National Taiwan University (“The Night of Hua Xi Street”(华西街之夜)) (1984)

== Works ==
=== Academic Monograph ===
- 《艺游狮城：翻看新加坡美术手账》（台北：远流文化，2024年）(Artful Wanderings in the Lion City: Exploring Singapore's Artistic Visual Note, Taipei Yuan-Liou Publishing Co., Ltd., 2024)
- 《AIGC文图学：人類3.0時代的生產力》（北京：中國社會科學出版社，2024） (Studies on AIGC: Productivity in the Age of Humanity 3.0, China Social Sciences Press, 2024)
- 《第一次遇見蘇東坡》（上海：上海人民出版社，2024） (The First Time I Met Su Dongpo, Shanghai People's Publishing House, 2024)
- 《星洲创意：文本．传媒．图像新加坡》（新加坡：八方文化創作室，2023） (Creative Nanyang: Text, Media, and Image in Singapore, Singapore: World Scientific Publishing, 2023)
- 《自爱自在：苏东坡的生活哲学》（北京：天地出版，2023） (Self-regard and Freedom: The Life Philosophy of Su Dongpo, Beijing: Tiandi Press, 2023)
- 《暢敘幽情：文圖學詩畫四重奏》（杭州：西冷印社，2022） (Free Our Most Hidden Feelings: Quartet of Text and Image Studies, Hangzhuo: Xiling Seal Art Society, 2022)
- 《倍萬自愛：學著蘇東坡愛自己，享受快意人生》（台北：有鹿出版公司，2021） (Dear Me: Learn Self-Love from Su Dongpo, Delight in Life, Taipei: Route Culture, 2021)
- 《陪你去看蘇東坡》（北京：商務印書館，2021） (Bringing You Through the Journey of Su Dongpo, The Commercial Press, 2021)
- 《春光秋波：看見文圖學》(南京：南京大學出版社，2020)

(Through the Ages: Encountering Text and Image Studies, Nanjing University Press, 2020)

- 《陪你去看蘇東坡》(台北：有鹿文化，2020)

(Bringing You Through the Journey of Su Dongpo, Route Culture, 2020)

- 《書藝東坡》(上海：上海古籍出版社，2019)

(The Art of Su Dongpo's Calligraphy, Shanghai Chinese Classics Publishing House, 2019)

- 《東張西望：文圖學與亞洲視界》(新加坡：八方文化創作室，2019)

(Observing the Synergy: Text and Image Studies and Asia Horizon, Singapore: Global Publishing, 2019)

- 《南洋風華：藝文•廣告•跨界新加坡》（新加坡：八方文化創作室，2016）

(Gorgeous Nanyang: Arts, Advertisements, Crossover Singapore, Singapore: Global Publishing, 2016)

- 《雲影天光：瀟湘山水之畫意與詩情》（臺北：里仁書局，2013）

(Of Cloud Shadows and Celestial Light: Poems and Paintings of the Landscape of Xiao Xiang, Taipei: Li Ren Shu Ju, 2013)

- 《藝林探微：繪畫•古物•文學》（上海：華東師範大學出版社，2012）

(Exploration of Art, Shanghai: East China Normal University Press, 2012)

- 《遊目騁懷：文學與美術的互文與再生》（臺北：里仁書局，2011）

(Intextuality and Citationality in Chinese Literature and Art, Taipei: Li Ren Shu Ju, 2011)

- 《三絕之美鄭板橋》（臺北：花木蘭出版社，2009）

(The Poetry, Paintings and Calligraphy of Zheng Banqiao, Taipei: Hua Mu Lan Publisher, 2009)

- 《觀看•敍述•審美：唐宋題畫文學論集》（臺北：中央研究院中國文哲研究所，2004）

(Observation, Description, Appreciation: Studies of Tang-Song Writings on Painting, Taipei: Institute of Chinese Literature and Philosophy, Academia Sinica, 2004)

- 《赤壁漫遊與西園雅集：蘇軾研究論集》（北京：線裝書局，2001）

(Wandering Under the Red Cliffs and Elegant Gathering in the Western Garden: Studies on Su Shi, Beijing: Xian Zhuang Shu Ju, 2001)

- 《蘇軾研究史》（與曾棗莊合著）（南京：江蘇教育出版社，2001）（四川省政府優良學術著作獎）

(A History of Su Shi Studies, co-authored with Zeng Zaozhuang, Nanjing: Jiangsu Education Publisher, 2001)

- 《世變與創化：漢唐、唐宋轉換期之文藝現象》（與劉苑如合編）（臺北：中央研究院中國文哲研究所，2000）

(Historical Transitions and Creativity: Literature and Art in the Han-Tang and Tang-Song Transitions, co-edited with Liu Yuan-ju, Taipei: Institute of Chinese Literature and Philosophy, Academia Sinica, 2000)

- 《蘇軾題畫文學研究》（臺北：文津出版社，1999）

(Su Shi's Literary Works on Paintings, Taipei: Wen Chin Publisher, 1999)
