= Tai-Ping Liu =

Taiwanese mathematician

- 劉太平
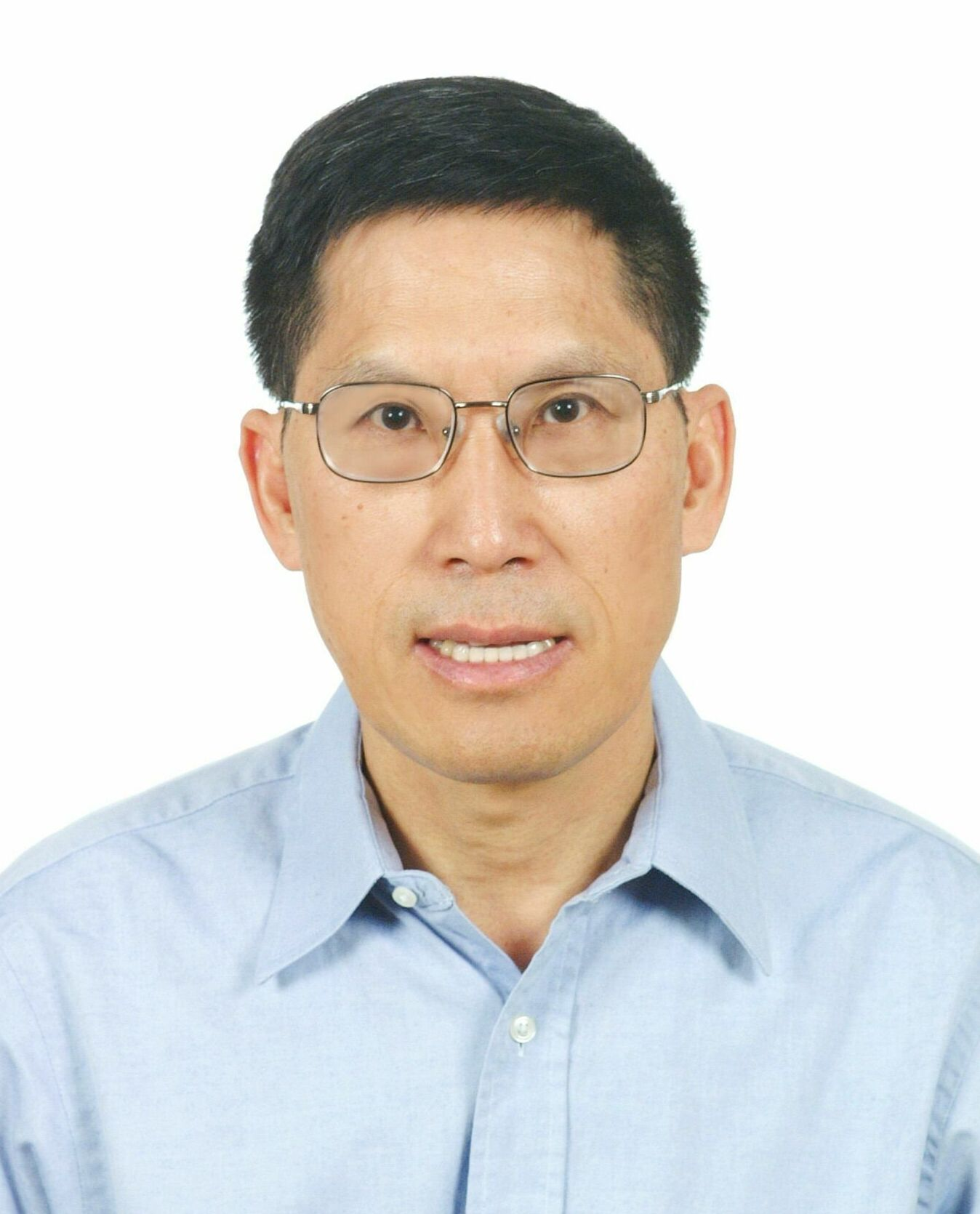
- Born: 18 November 1945 (age 80); Taiwan
- Education: National Taiwan University (BS); Oregon State University (MS); University of Michigan (PhD)
- Scientific career
- Fields: Mathematics
- Workplaces: University of Maryland, College Park; New York University; Stanford University
- Thesis: Riemann problem for general 2 × 2 systems of conservation laws (1973)
- Doctoral advisor: Joel Smoller

Tai-Ping Liu (Chinese: 劉太平; pinyin: Liú Tàipíng; born 18 November 1945) is a Taiwanese mathematician specializing in partial differential equations.

== Education and career ==
Liu earned his bachelor's degree in mathematics in 1968 from National Taiwan University, his master's degree in 1970 from Oregon State University, and his Ph.D. in 1973 from University of Michigan. His dissertation, supervised by Joel Smoller, was titled, "Riemann problem for general 2 × 2 systems of conservation laws".

After receiving his doctorate, Liu was a professor at University of Maryland, from 1988 at New York University and from 1990 at Stanford University, where he is now retired. Since 2000 he has been a Distinguished Research Fellow at the Academia Sinica. He was elected a Fellow of the American Mathematical Society in 2012.

His research deals with nonlinear partial differential equations, hyperbolic conservation laws, shock waves, the Boltzmann equation, and equations of gas dynamics. He is the author or coauthor of over 140 research publications.

In 1998 he gave the DiPerna lecture. In 1992 Liu became a member of Academia Sinica. In 2002 he was an Invited Speaker with talk Shock Waves at the International Congress of Mathematicians in Beijing.

== Selected publications ==
- Hyperbolic and viscous conservation laws, CBMS Regional Conference, SIAM 2000 doi:10.1137/1.9780898719420
- Admissible solutions of hyperbolic conservation laws, Memoirs AMS, No. 240, 1981.
- Nonlinear stability of shock waves for viscous conservation laws, Memoirs AMS, No. 328, 1985
- with Y. Zeng: Large-time Behavior of Solutions of General Quasilinear Hyperbolic-Parabolic Systems of Conservation Laws, Memoirs AMS, No. 599, 1997
- as editor with Heinrich Freistühler and Anders Szepessy: Advances in the theory of shock waves, Birkhäuser 2001
