= National Semiconductor Technology Center =

American research institution

The National Semiconductor Technology Center (NSTC) is a research institution operated by Natcast. It is a consortium comprising governments, industries, and academic institutions.

== History ==
The center was established through the CHIPS and Science Act, which allocated US$11 billion for the initiative to establish several research centers. In October 2024, Albany, New York was selected to be the site of its first research center.

== See also ==
- Vijay Raghunathan, a member of the workforce advisory board
