= Fushih Pan =

Taiwanese plastic surgeon

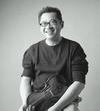
- Born: 17 October 1957 (age 68); Taipei, Taiwan
- Education: National Taiwan University (BS); University of Chicago (MD, PhD)
- Known for: development of MIRA Procedure, (Minimally Invasive Reconstructive Angiography)
- Scientific career
- Fields: Plastic Surgery, Chemistry
- Workplaces: National Taiwan University University of Chicago University of Pennsylvania

Fushih Pan (born 17 October 1957) is a Taiwanese plastic surgeon and chemist.

== Life ==
Fushih Pan was born in Taipei, Taiwan, on 17 October 1957. He graduated from National Taiwan University with a bachelor's degree in chemistry in 1979, then completed graduate studies in the United States from 1986 to 1989 at the University of Chicago, where he earned a Doctor of Medicine (M.D.) and his Ph.D. in chemistry. He completed all of his doctoral qualifications in the United States where he resided as a plastic surgeon in many hospitals and as an instructor in the department of plastic surgery in the University of Pennsylvania.

Fushih Pan represented Taiwan as a team member for the Physicians for Peace organization and Northwest Medical to offer medical skills and advice in Developing Countries who were in the state of war like Estonia, Mexico, and Honduras from 1993 to 1994.

Fushih Pan returned to Taiwan in 1995. There he established a clinic where he currently performs plastic surgery. During the following the years Fushih Pan has taken part in many research projects along with the University of Chicago, University of Pennsylvania as well as the National Taiwan University.

His most recent research on stem cell tracking using mesoporous nanoparticles, binding of short chain peptides on to gold and silver nanoparticles as a platform of biomarkers, and modification of MSC differentiation using nanopeptides in the National Taiwan University, have led him to the development of the MIRA Procedure in 2009.

The MIRA Procedure is a multidisciplinary method for treating many chronic disease such as heart or liver failure. This procedure has also proved to be useful in the field of cosmetic surgery as it has spawned a successful alternative to a facelift known as the MIRA Lift.
