= H.-S. Philip Wong =

Professor of electrical engineering

- 黃漢森
- Education: The University of Hong Kong, Hong Kong; State University of New York, Stony Brook, New York, USA; Lehigh University Bethlehem, PA, USA
- Known for: microelectronics, VLSI, semiconductor technology, nanotechnology, transistors and memory devices
- Awards: IEEE J.J. Ebers Award (2019)
- Scientific career
- Fields: Electrical engineering
- Doctoral advisor: Prof. Marvin H. White
- Doctoral students: Deji Akinwande, University of Texas - Austin Shimeng Yu, Georgia Tech Sangbum Kim, Seoul National University Ethan C. Ahn, George Mason University Haitong Li, Purdue University

H.-S. Philip Wong (Chinese: 黃漢森, pinyin: huáng hàn sēn) is the Willard R. and Inez Kerr Bell professor in the School of Engineering, He is professor of Electrical Engineering at Stanford University. He is a Chinese-American electrical engineer whose career centers on nanotechnology, microelectronics, and semiconductor technology.

== Biography ==
H.-S. Philip Wong completed his B.Sc. (Hons) in Electrical Engineering at the University of Hong Kong in 1982. He received his MS (1983) in Electrical Engineering from State University of New York, Stony Brook, and his PhD (1988) in Electrical Engineering from Lehigh University, under the tutelage of Professor Marvin H. White.

After completing his doctoral degree, he joined the IBM Thomas J. Watson Research Center at Yorktown Heights, New York, in 1988. At IBM, he held various positions from Research Staff Member to Senior Manager. He joined Stanford University as Professor of Electrical Engineering in September 2004.

In 2019, he received the IEEE Electron Devices Society J.J. Ebers Award, the Society’s highest honor to recognize outstanding technical contributions to the field of electron devices that have made a lasting impact.

In 2018, he took a leave of absence from Stanford to serve as Vice President of Corporate Research at TSMC (NYSE: TSM, Taiwan Stock Exchange: 2330), the largest semiconductor foundry in the world.

== Other academic appointments ==
- Hong Kong Polytechnic University: Visiting Chair Professor of Nanoelectronics
- Institute of Microelectronics, Chinese Academy of Sciences, Beijing, China: Honorary Professor
- Peking University, Beijing, China: Visiting Professor
- IMEP-LAHC, Grenoble, France: Chair of Excellence (Chaire d’Excellence de la Fondation Nanosciences)
- Hong Kong University of Science and Technology, Hong Kong: Visiting Professor

== Awards and honors ==
- 2012, Honorary Doctorate Degree (Docteur Honoris Causa), Grenoble Institute of Technology (Institut Polytechnique de Grenoble), France
- 2001, Fellow, IEEE
- 2019, IEEE Electron Devices Society, J. J. Ebers Award

== Published ==
- H.-S. P. Wong and D. Akinwande, “Carbon Nanotube and Graphene Device Physics,” Cambridge University Press, 2011. (ISBN 9780521519052).
