= Chang-Shou Lin =

Taiwanese mathematician

Chang-Shou Lin (Chinese: 林長壽; born 17 April 1951) is a Taiwanese mathematician.

== Education and career ==
Lin completed his bachelor's and master's degrees in mathematics at National Taiwan University. He then completed doctoral study at New York University in the United States in 1983, and was a member of the Institute for Advanced Study between 1984 and 1985. He taught at NTU from 1987 to 1990, when he joined the faculty of National Chung Cheng University. Lin was director of the National Center for Theoretical Sciences between 1993 and 2003. In 2006, Lin returned to NTU as director of the Institute for Mathematical Sciences.

In his research, Lin has explored mean field theory and Eisenstein series. Lin was elected a member of Academia Sinica in 1998, received the Morningside Medal that same year, and was awarded Taiwan's Presidential Science Prize in 2001. He is an editor of the Bulletin of the Institute of Mathematics, published by Academia Sinica. In 2014, Lin was invited to speak at the International Congress of Mathematicians conference in Seoul, South Korea.

Lin was critical of the Democratic Progressive Party response to the Sunflower Student Movement, and has signed petitions backing required mathematics education for Taiwanese senior high school students, and against the nuclear energy question posed by the 2018 Taiwanese referendum.
