= Angela Yang =

Chinese-American librarian

- Born: Taiwan
- Education: National Taiwan University (BA); University of Oregon (MLS)
- Occupations: Retired librarian Former president of Chinese American Librarians Association
- Known for: Adult literacy Community outreach Multicultural services

Angela Yang is a Taiwanese-American librarian whose efforts in adult literacy, multicultural services, and outreach services is notable within the library community. She served as president of the Chinese American Librarians Association from 1992 to 1993. She was born in Taiwan.

Yang's career has been characterized by a desire to improve literacy skills among underprivileged and overlooked individuals in society. She established a successful adult literacy program and introduced library services to a wider population that included the elderly and disabled communities.

== Education and early career ==
Angela Yang grew up in Taiwan with her twice-refugee family. She pursued her undergraduate education at National Taiwan University, where she received her bachelor's in foreign language and literature. She then moved to the U.S. to attain an advanced degree. Initially, Yang wanted to become an educator but decided to instead attend library school at the University of Oregon. She worked as a newspaper reporter before assuming the role of children's librarian.

Yang was the first outreach services librarian for the San Diego Public Library. In San Diego, she served on the City Council for the Aging, as well as the council for Minority Elderly. Following her career in the public setting, Yang became the multicultural services librarian at the University of California, Irvine, where she eventually became the university's first outreach services librarian. She worked at UC Irvine for 10 years participating in research consultation, bibliographic instruction, and reference services, in addition to community outreach.

Another notable feature in Yang's career was her participation in southern California's "Partnerships for Change" initiative. The mission of this program was "to assist California libraries in analyzing and restructuring their library service programs and policies to respond to the ethnic and cultural diversity of their communities."

In 1989, Yang's accomplishments were recognized when San Diego City Club presented her with the Finest Citizen of the Finest City Award. From 1992 to 1993, Yang also served as president of the Chinese American Librarians Association.

== Library philosophy, Fremont libraries, and retirement ==
In a personal communication from the summer of 1999 with Mengxiong Liu of San Jose State University's Clark Library, Yang wrote: "the guiding principles that propelled me to take on new assignments and newly created jobs have always been my strong belief in the important roles of a library in the community, and my practice of Confucius' teaching that among any three people, I can find at least one teacher."

Angela Yang became a branch manager for the Fremont libraries in Alameda County, California in 2002. She has been credited with bringing Fremont libraries into the modern age and expanding services from traditional audiences to include the greater local community.

She retired from Fremont in May 2008. Prior to this, Yang also volunteered as a kayaking guide with the Newport Bay Interpretive Center, for which she said that she would like to continue working with. In retirement, she said that she would also like to volunteer for libraries and take classes.

== Organizational involvement ==
- American Library Association Committee on Education and Committee on Orientation, Training, and Leadership Development
- California Library Association and committees
- California State Library
- Gifted and Talented Education Association
- International Rotary
- Literacy Volunteers of America
- Local historical and cultural foundations
- San Diego City Council for the Aging
- San Diego Council for Minority Elderly
- Second White House Conference on Library and Information Services, as a California delegate
- U.S.-China library conferences, as a delegate and translator
- University of California Librarians Association
