= MIRA procedure =

MIRA (Minimally Invasive Reconstructive Angiography) is a multidisciplinary and complementary method for treating many chronic diseases. It basically consists in medically grafting live rejuvenated tissue in the form of autologous adipose adult stem cells to a damaged organ in order to restore it and improve its function. This method is currently approved by the U.S. Food and Drug Administration (FDA).

The MIRA Procedure is a result of combining efforts from different medical fields developed in the University of Chicago in 1992.

== History ==
The MIRA Procedure originated as a result of combining medical innovations and was developed as a multidisciplinary technique for applications in a wide range of medical fields. In other words, this procedure was not developed for a specific application, it is a compilation from data and experience retrieved through years of research as well as practice that have been put together to create a new alternative to treat many diseases and other applications.

In 1989 Dr. Christoph Broelsch performed the first successful living donor liver transplantation in the University of Chicago. Nearly two years old Alyssa Smith was the first to receive part of a living’s person liver donated in this case by her mother. The remarkable results improved current prognosis on patients who required a liver transplant but even then there were far from meeting the demand and many hundreds to this date die waiting for a donor. This procedure has also sparked some controversial and legal issues for enticing organ trafficking and its practice is currently restricted in some countries.

In 1992, at the University of Chicago Dr. Fushih Pan is amongst the first to attempt repairing damaged organ tissue by tissue grafting, but with little success due to technological limitations for keeping the grafted tissue live and functional. Dr. Fushih Pan later becomes much more involved in the steps that followed in order to develop the MIRA procedure.

In 1995, the University of Pennsylvania caught the first glimpse of regenerative medicine after successfully regenerating cranial bone. During the same year these results led to determination pressure of adequate tissue growth in cases with anophthalmia.

In 1998 Dr. J. Peter Rubin from the University of Pittsburgh developed a basic science research program in the biology of adipose derived stem cells and serves as co-director of the Adipose Stem Cell Center at the University of Pittsburgh. More recently he has determined the safety on fat derived stem cells for breast reconstruction after mastectomy as long as there is no evidence of cancer.

In the year 2002 the UCLA under direction of Dr. Marc H. Hedrick M.D. started research on possible applications of adult stem cells generating positive results.

Opting for research on adult stem cells rather than embryonic stem cells resulted amidst the stem cell controversy that involve diverse ethical concerns and religious groups, most prominently the Catholic Church. Embryonic stem cells till this day are frowned upon many for the implication of the destruction of human embryos, yet the progress of adult stem cells has produced more promising results.

After the introduction of the subject of stem cells into the mainstream, it was of utmost importance to keep the public aware of the difference of embryonic Stem Cells and adult stem cells. To help clarify the matter, in 2006 the Pope of the Catholic Church openly stated the encouragement on research on adult stem cells.

In 2008, after years of research the University of Pittsburgh and the UCLA come together sharing their progress in order to the develop a viable stem cell treatment.

Dr. Kotaro Yoshimura was one of the first to implement an alternative to breast augmentation by safely grafting fat stem cells in 2006. In 2009 at the University of Tokyo he was able to determine the adequate pressure for grafting ADSC more effectively, paving the road to diverse applications for the future. After this breakthrough the engraftment rate was improved even further thanks to the development of a nanoscale shielding using biomaterials approved by the U.S. Food and Drug Administration (FDA). With this, Dr. Fushih Pan was able to successfully develop a safe and reliable medical procedure now known as the MIRA Procedure.

The concept of the MIRA procedure can be considered more off as a minimally invasive tissue graft which function restoring capabilities work under the principles of adult stem cells. The treatments potential use lies in improving patients with chronic diseases such as heart and liver failure as well as those with neurodegenerative diseases like Alzheimer's disease and multiple sclerosis. In 2010, the MIRA procedure spawned highly efficient alternatives to some operations in the field of cosmetics. The MIRA Lift is now an alternative for a face lift that rejuvenates the face's skin cells in order to produce more collagen for better and more natural results. Currently an alternative for breast augmentation surgery is also being implemented. All this is done in a minimally invasive way that involves almost no downtime to the patient.

== Clinical procedure (simplified) ==
The MIRA procedure consists of the following steps:

1. Harvest the resting progenitor cells- Bone marrow and/or adipose tissue are collected through liposuction by a reconstructive surgeon which are then harvested by a MIRA specialist.
2. Activate them intro-operatively- The cells capable of restoration are usually in a resting state. Through a proprietary method, these cells are awakened and activated into their growth stage. This allows the cells to replicate themselves and eventually increase the number of the arm force.
3. Package the activated cells with a protective shield- Activated progenitor cells are very fragile after being harvested and manipulated, making their engraftment rate less than 10%. Therefore, experts on the field developed a porous nanoscale shielding using biomaterials that are FDA approved that drastically increases engraftment rate and improve the results of organ function.
4. Delivery to the damaged tissue- Lastly, all of the packages are delivered to the nearest location to the injured site of the organ using a high-resolution angiogram operated by a high-skilled reconstructive surgeon for approaching, identifying, and isolating the feeder arterioles. This step is further assisted by an interventional radiologist for a more precise application.
- The MIRA Lift, alternative to a facelift, is combined with photorejuvenation for optimal results. The treatment of choice typically being Thermage.

== Applications ==
The MIRA Procedure has numerous applications for different fields and many more are still in development:

Clinical applications

- Ischemic Incidence

- Heart disease, kidney disease, brain damage, muscle damage

- Fibrosis

- Liver cirrhosis, pulmonary fibrosis

- Growth impairment

- Epiphyseal plate

- Degeneration

- Neurological

- Parkinson's disease, multiple sclerosis, Alzheimer's disease, retina damage

- Integument

- Osteoarthritis, certain types of skin diseases

- Cancer

- Prostate cancer
- Pancreatic ductal carcinoma

Cosmetic applications

- Facial rejuvenation
- Breast augmentation
- Alopecia or hair loss

== Advantages ==
Medical field:

- Unlike organ transplants, patients who opt for the MIRA Procedure do not rely on availability of a compatible donor for operation.
- The procedure, as it names indicate, is minimally invasive therefore is the safest and most reliable alternative up to date.
- There is minimal downtime after the procedure and the cost is much more affordable to the patients.
- If necessary, the patient can decide to repeat the procedure for further improvement on his or her condition.
- No risk of scarring.

Cosmetic field:

- More natural appearance after the procedure compared to surgical alternatives.
- Removes uneven pigmentation and reduces the appearance of scars.
- No risk of scarring.

== Limitations or complications ==
Patients who are not physically adequate to undergo a liposuction may not be subject for a MIRA procedure.

A drawback for the breast augmentation surgery is that it only provides half the extra volume when compared to current implants.

== Future ==
Currently the MIRA Procedure is most well known as an alternative to cosmetic surgery but has proved to be successful in restoring health to patients with chronic heart disease and cirrhotic liver. Soon enough further research will be employed to develop an adequate treatment for certain types of cancer as well as neuro-degenerative diseases with more efficacy.

The MIRA Procedure has proven to be a significant alternative to Embryonic Stem Cell treatments which still are under development. The procedure also has some advantages over Embryonic Stem Cell treatments due to its simplicity and therefore its financial cost.
