= Christian Helmut Wenzel =

German philosopher

- Awards: Humboldt Research Award

Education
- Education: University of Illinois at Urbana-Champaign (PhD); University of Wuppertal (PhD)
- Thesis: Classification of All Parabolic Subgroup-Schemes of a Semi-Simple Linear Algebraic Group over an Algebraically Closed Field (1990)
- Doctoral advisor: William Joseph Haboush

Philosophical work
- Era: 21st-century philosophy
- Region: Western philosophy
- School: Kantian philosophy
- Institutions: National Taiwan University, National Chi Nan University
- Website: https://sites.google.com/site/wenzelchristian1/home

Christian Helmut Wenzel is a German philosopher and mathematician who is a distinguished professor at National Taiwan University. He is known for his works on Kantian philosophy.

== Books ==
- An Introduction to Kant's Aesthetics: Core Concepts and Problems, with foreword by Henry Allison, Oxford: Blackwell Publishers 2005, viii + 183 p. ISBN 978-1-4051-3035-6 (hardcover), 978-1-4051-3036-3 (paperback).
- Das Problem der Subjektiven Allgemeingültigkeit des Geschmacksurteils bei Kant, volume 137 in the series Kant-Studien Ergänzungshefte, Walter de Gruyter, 2000, viii + 208 p. ISBN 3-11-016744-1 (hardcover)
