= James M. Early =

American electrical engineer

- Born: July 25, 1922; Syracuse, New York, U.S.
- Died: January 12, 2004 (aged 81); VA Palo Alto Health Care System; Palo Alto, California
- Education: Ohio State University

James M. Early (July 25, 1922 – January 12, 2004) was an American electrical engineer, best known for his work on transistors and charge-coupled device imagers. He was also known as Jim Early.

== Biography ==
He was born on July 25, 1922, in Syracuse, New York. He received an MSE degree (1948) and his Ph.D. (1951) all from Ohio State University.

The Early effect in bipolar junction transistors is named after Jim Early, who first characterized it and published a paper on it in 1952. The Early effect in bipolar junction transistors is due to an effective decrease in the base width because of the widening of the base-collector depletion region, resulting in an increase in the collector current with an increase in the collector voltage. The same type of length modulation in MOSFETs is also commonly referred to as Early effect.

Early was the first to make a transistor that would oscillate faster than "a thousand megacycles" (1 GHz), circa 1952, for which feat he won a bottle of Scotch whisky from John Robinson Pierce.

He also developed the transistors for America's first commercial communications satellite, the Telstar I. He was elevated to IEEE Fellow.

In the early 1970s, Early led research for Fairchild Semiconductor, where he invented the vertical anti-blooming drain for CCD image sensors.

He died on January 12, 2004, at the VA Palo Alto Health Care System in Palo Alto, California.
