= John L. Moll =

American electrical engineer (1921–2011)

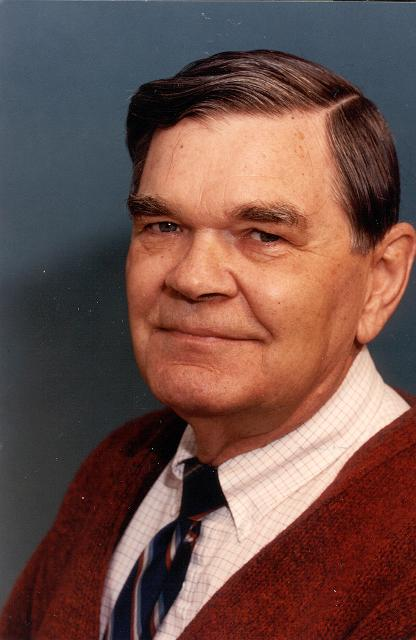
- Born: December 21, 1921; Wauseon, Ohio, US
- Died: July 19, 2011 (aged 89); Palo Alto, California, US
- Known for: Ebers–Moll model MOS diode Step recovery diode Thyristor
- Awards: Howard N. Potts Medal (1967); J J Ebers Award (1971); IEEE Lamme Medal (1989); IEEE Edison Medal (1991); C&C Prize (1997)

John Louis Moll (December 21, 1921 – July 19, 2011) was an American electrical engineer, notable for his contributions to solid-state physics.

== Biography ==
Moll was born in Wauseon, Ohio, and obtained a B.S. in physics and a Ph.D. in electrical engineering from Ohio State University in 1943 and 1952, respectively. The Ebers-Moll transistor model, and the theory of the p-n-p-n switch, came from this effort.

He was a professor of electrical engineering at Stanford University from 1958 to 1970.

Moll was the recipient of the Guggenheim Fellowship in 1964; Howard N. Potts Medal, Franklin Institute, 1967, and received the IEEE Edison Medal in 1991 "for pioneering contributions to diffused and oxide-masked silicon devices, transistor analysis, the p-n-p-n switch, and optoelectronics."

He was a Fellow of the IEEE and a member of the American Physical Society, the National Academy of Engineering, and the National Academy of Sciences.
