= International Electron Devices Meeting =

Nanoelectronics conference

The IEEE International Electron Devices Meeting (IEDM) is an annual micro- and nanoelectronics conference held each December that serves as a forum for reporting technological breakthroughs in the areas of semiconductor and related device technologies, design, manufacturing, physics, modeling and circuit-device interaction.

IEDM brings together managers, engineers, and scientists from industry, academia, and government around the world to discuss CMOS transistor technology, memory, displays, sensors, MEMS devices, quantum devices, nanoscale devices, optoelectronics, power, process technology, and device modeling and simulation. The conference also encompasses discussions and presentations on devices in silicon, compound and organic semiconductors, and emerging material systems. IEDM has technical paper presentations and plenary presentations, panel sessions, invited talks, and exhibits.

The IEEE IEDM is where "Moore’s Law" got its name, as Gordon Moore first published his predictions in an article in Electronics Magazine in 1965. Ten years later he refined them in a talk at the IEDM, and from that point on people began referring to them as Moore's Law. Moore’s Law states that the complexity of integrated circuits would double approximately every two years.

The IEEE International Electron Devices Meeting is sponsored by the Electron Devices Society of the Institute of Electrical and Electronics Engineers (IEEE). The 72nd annual IEEE IEDM conference will be held December 12-16, 2026 at the Hilton San Francisco Union Square Hotel.

== History ==
The First Annual Technical Meeting on Electron Devices (renamed the International Electron Devices Meeting in the mid-1960s) took place on October 24–25, 1955 at the Shoreham Hotel in Washington, D.C., with approximately 700 scientists and engineers in attendance. At that time, the seven-year-old transistor and the electron tube reigned as the predominant electron-device technology. Fifty-four papers were presented on the then state-of-the-art in electron device technology, the majority of them from four U.S. companies -- Bell Telephone Laboratories, RCA Corporation, Hughes Aircraft Co. and Sylvania Electric Products. The need for an electron devices meeting was driven by two factors: commercial opportunities in the fast-growing new "solid-state" branch of electronics, and the U.S. government's desire for solid-state components and better microwave tubes for aerospace and defense.

== Events ==
=== IEDM 2015 ===
The 2015 International Electron Devices Meeting took place at the Washington Hilton Hotel from December 5–9, 2015. The major topics included ultra-small transistors, advanced memories, low-power devices for mobile & Internet of Things (IoT) applications, alternatives to silicon transistors, and 3D integrated circuit (IC) technology. There were also a broad range of papers addressing some of the fastest-growing specialized areas in micro/nanoelectronics, including silicon photonics, physically flexible circuits, and brain-inspired computing.

=== IEDM 2016 ===
The 2016 IEEE International Devices Meeting took place at the Hilton San Francisco Union Square from December 3–7, 2016. The 2016 edition of the IEDM emphasized the following topics: advanced transistors, new memory technologies, brain-inspired computing, bioelectronics, and power electronics.

=== IEDM 2017 ===
The 2017 IEEE International Devices Meeting took place at the Hilton San Francisco Union Square from December 2–6, 2017. Highlights included Nobel Prize winner Hiroshi Amano speaking on ‘Transformative Electronics’, AMD President & CEO Lisa Su speaking on multi-chip technologies for high-performance computing; and Intel and Globalfoundries detailing their competing new FinFET technology platforms. Also, IBM’s Dan Edelstein gave a retrospective on copper interconnect. Copper interconnect (i.e., the wiring on computer chips) revolutionized the industry 20 years ago.

=== IEDM 2018 ===
The 2018 IEEE-IEDM took place at the Hilton San Francisco Union Square from December 1–5, 2018. Highlights included three plenary talks that addressed key future directions for semiconductor technology and business practices. Jeffery Welser, Vice President of IBM Research-Almaden, spoke about the hardware needed for artificial research (AI), while Eun Seung Jung, President of Samsung's Foundry Business, spoke about the challenges and opportunities facing chip foundries. Professor Gerhard Fettweis of TU Dresden, meanwhile, spoke about new ways to structure research into semiconductors to effectively pursue non-traditional uses such as bendable, flexible electronic systems. The conference also included an evening panel discussion during which a panel of industry experts looked forward for the next 25 years. The technical program featured many noteworthy papers on a range of topics, such as innovative memories for AI applications; quantum computing; wireless communications; power devices; and many more.

=== IEDM 2019 ===
The 2019 IEEE International Electron Devices Meeting (IEDM) took place in San Francisco, CA on December 7–11, 2019. Robert Chau, Intel Senior Fellow, gave a Plenary talk in which he discussed how ongoing innovation will help the industry stay on the path of Moore’s Law. In other Plenary talks, Martin van den Brink, President/Chief Technical Officer of ASML N.V., discussed the importance of EUV lithography, and Kazu Ishimaru, Senior Fellow at Kioxia, discussed the future of non-volatile memory. The technical program was highlighted by talks from Taiwan Semiconductor Manufacturing Co. on its forthcoming 5 nm chip manufacturing technology and by Intel on better ways to manufacture 3D chips. The program also featured many papers discussing various ways to use new memory technologies for artificial intelligence (AI) computing and other applications.

=== IEDM 2020 ===
The 2020 IEEE International Electron Devices Meeting (IEDM) was held virtually from December 12–18, 2020. Highlights included three plenary talks that addressed important issues for semiconductor technology development: Sri Samavedam, senior vice president at imec, discussed ways to continue scaling in logic devices, while Naga Chandrasekaran, senior vice president at Micron Technology, talked about the innovations needed for advanced memory technologies. Meanwhile, Sungwoo Hwang, President of Samsung’s Advanced Institute of Technology, gave an overview on the coming symbiosis of semiconductors, AI and quantum computing. The technical program was highlighted by talks from Intel Corp. on a 3D stacked nanosheet transistor architecture, and from Taiwan Semiconductor Manufacturing Co., which gave details about its 5 nm CMOS FinFET technology.

=== IEDM 2021 ===
The 67th annual IEEE International Electron Devices Meeting was held December 11–15, 2021 at the Hilton San Francisco Union Square hotel, with on-demand content available afterward. The Plenary talks were: The Smallest Engine Transforming Humanity: The Past, Present, and Future, by Kinam Kim, Vice Chairman & CEO, Head of Samsung Electronics Device Solutions Division, Samsung; Creating the Future: Augmented Reality, the Next Human-Machine Interface, by Michael Abrash, Chief Scientist, Facebook Reality Labs; and Quantum Computing Technology, by Heike Riel, Head of Science & Technology, IBM Research and IBM Fellow.

=== IEDM 2022 ===
The 68th annual IEEE International Electron Devices Meeting was held December 3-7, 2022 at the Hilton San Francisco Union Square hotel. Major themes were increasingly powerful logic devices and memories for artificial intelligence (AI) and other applications; better power devices in support of the growing electrification of society; and five special Focus Sessions in areas of intense research interest: Advanced Heterogeneous Integration; Bio-Computing; Emerging Implantable Device Technology; Quantum Computing; and Special Topics in non-von Neumann Computing. The Plenary talks were:

- “Celebrating 75 Years of Transistor Innovation by Looking Ahead to the Next Set of Industry Grand Challenges,” by Ann Kelleher, Executive VP/General Manager of Technology Development, Intel
- “Expanding Human Potential through Imaging and Sensing Technologies,” by Yusuke Oike, General Manager, Sony Semiconductor Solutions
- “Enabling Full Fault-Tolerant Quantum Computing with Silicon-Based VLSI Technologies,” by Maud Vinet, Quantum Hardware Program Manager, CEA-Leti

=== IEDM 2023 ===
The 69th annual IEEE IEDM was held at the Hilton San Francisco Union Square hotel from December 9–13, 2023. The theme for 2023 was “Devices for a Smart World Built Upon 60 Years of CMOS.” Among the program highlights were three Plenary talks:

- "Redefining Innovation: A Journey forward in the New Dimension Era," by Siyoung Choi, President & GM, Samsung Foundry Business, Device Solutions Division
- "The Next Big Thing: Making Memory Magic and the Economics Beyond Moore's Law," by Thy Tran, Vice President of Global Frontend Procurement, Micron Technology
- "Semiconductor Challenges in the 5G and 6G Technology Platforms," by Björn Ekelund, Corporate Research Director, Ericsson

The IEEE IEDM conference was followed by the 15th MRAM Global Innovation Forum, sponsored by the IEEE Magnetics Society, which was held in the same venue on Thursday, Dec. 14.

=== IEDM 2024 ===
The 70th annual IEEE IEDM was held at the Hilton San Francisco Union Square hotel from December 7–11, 2024. The keynote talks were:

- Semiconductor Industry Outlook and New Technology Frontiers, by Y-J. Mii, Executive Vice President and Co-Chief Operating Officer, TSMC
- Advancing AI with Energy-Efficient Architectures: Innovations in Fab Process, Packaging, and System Integration, by Mark Fuselier, Sr. Vice President, Technology and Product Engineering, AMD
- Revolutionizing Power Electronics with Silicon Carbide to Pioneer Sustainable Solutions, by Elif Balkas, Chief Technology Officer, Wolfspeed

=== IEDM 2025 ===
The 71st annual IEEE IEDM was held at the Hilton San Francisco Union Square hotel from December 6–10, 2025. The keynote talks were:

- Electron Device Challenges to Enable Individual Centric Edge AI, by Chidi Chidambaram, Senior Vice President & Fellow at Qualcomm
- Inside Enterprise Mission-Critical Computing, by Hillery Hunter, CTO, IBM Infrastructure and GM, Innovation; IBM Fellow at IBM
- Essential Semiconductors - Innovation and Impact, by Ted Letavic, Senior Vice President, GlobalFoundries

== Additional information ==
- IEDM
- IEDM on Facebook
- IEDM on Twitter: @ieee_iedm
- Electron Device Society of the IEEE
- IEEE
- IEEE Xplore Digital Library

== Related conferences ==
- Symposia on VLSI Technology and Circuits
- International Solid-State Circuits Conference
- Device Research Conference
- Hot Chips: A Symposium of High Performance Chips
