= Yoram Raved =

Israeli lawyer and former PM advisor

- יורם ראב"ד
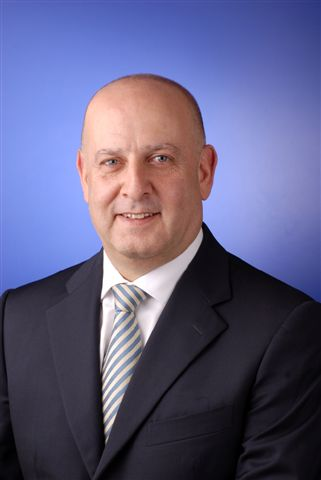
- Born: 1956 (age 69–70); Jerusalem, Israel
- Education: Tel Aviv University
- Occupation: Attorney
- Spouse: Ayala Raved
- Children: 4
- Website: https://www.shibolet.com/attorneys/yoram-raved/

Yoram Raved (Hebrew: יורם ראב"ד; born June 22, 1956) is an Israeli lawyer who specializes in commercial law. He is co-director of Shibolet, the fourth-largest law firm in Israel and Liberia's honorary consul in Israel.

== Biography ==
Yoram Raved was born in Jerusalem. His father, Dan Raved, was a Holocaust survivor who worked as a bacteriologist at the blood bank of Hadassah Medical Center in Ein Karem. His mother, Miriam, who immigrated to Mandate Palestine in the 1930s, headed a department for Diaspora affairs at the Jewish National Fund. At the age of eight, both parents died one after another. Following the death of his parents, Raved and his older brother Ari were sent to Hadassim youth village. After completing elementary school, he moved in with his grandmother in Tel Aviv and attended a local high school. Initially, he was drafted into the Israeli air force and underwent pilot training but then transferred to Unit 8200 of the Israeli Intelligence Corps. Upon his release, he studied law at Tel Aviv University, completing his degree in 1982.

Raved is married to Ayala, with whom he has four sons. He lives in Ramat Aviv Gimmel. Raved's oldest son, Tomer Raved, is the CEO of B communications, a public holding company and Bezeq's chairman and his second son, Itay Raved, was the CEO of the local branch of Lime in Israel, and currently he is Tesla's Israel CEO.

== career ==
In 1991, he decided to open his own office, specializing in commercial law. In 1994, he was joined by Yossi Benkel and David Magriso.

Raved was the acting attorney of Israeli prime minister Ariel Sharon and his family from 2000 to 2006. He was a member of the "Ranch Forum," a select group of friends and advisors that held weekly meetings at Sharon's cattle ranch in the Negev desert. At one point, Raved was tapped as head of Sharon's bureau but turned down the offer. Raved was present at the meeting at Sharon's ranch where Sharon's idea of Israeli disengagement from Gaza was first broached.

In 2004, he served as chief negotiator for the Likud party during marathon coalition talks to form a national unity government. Other members of the team included Justice Minister Tzipi Livni, coalition chairman Gideon Sa'ar and cabinet secretary Israel Maimon. He played an important role in the founding of the Kadima party in November 2005.

In 2006–2008, Raved took part in a series of confidential talks between Israel and the Palestinians organized by former foreign minister Shlomo Ben-Ami which took place under the aegis of the government of Spain. The goal was to reach an understanding between Ehud Olmert and Abu Mazen. The negotiating team, which included Giora Eiland and Gidi Grinstein of the Reut Institute, met dozens of times. In 2008, Raved served as an advisor to Tzipi Livni, the new chair Kadima, and headed her team of negotiators together with Israel Maimon in her efforts to form a coalition.

Raved's office specializes in capital investment, high tech, real estate, mergers, acquisitions, infrastructure and litigation. Raved's clients include Bank Hapoalim, Amidar, Mifal Hapayis, Elbit Systems, the Nochi Dankner, Poju Zabludowicz, Elron Electronic Industries, Haifa Chemicals, Elscint, Elbit Imaging, Mekorot, Tadiran and Cellcom. He also represents a number of Japanese firms in Israel, among them the Sumitomo Corporation, and accompanied Prime Minister Netanyahu on an official visit to Japan. In December 2017, Raved's office merged with Shibolet to form the fourth largest law firm in Israel.

== Public positions ==
Raved is the chairman of Arik - Ariel Sharon Leadership Association, a non-profit organization established by Shimon Peres and Meir Dagan and others. He sits on the board of Governors of Tel Aviv University and the university's Finance Committee, and serves as a board member of the Tel Aviv University Faculty of Law. In 2012, he was on a committee devoted to reforms in Sport in Israel, focusing on violence at soccer matches. In July 2020 he was appointed as Liberia's honorary consul in Israel.

== Awards and recognition ==
In 2003, Haaretz newspaper named him as one of the most successful lawyers in Israel. In 2004, he was on the list of the 100 most influential people in Israel compiled by The Marker. In 2008, Calcalist named his firm as one of the 15 top commercial law offices in Israel. In 2010, Ma'ariv ranked him among the 11 best corporate lawyers in Israel.

== See also ==
- Israeli law
- Politics of Israel
