= Focused Ultrasound Surgery Foundation =

Focused Ultrasound Surgery Foundation may refer to:

- Focused Ultrasound Foundation - medical foundation based in Charlottesville, Virginia, United States
- Insightec - medical device company headquartered in Israel
