= Jody Lulich =

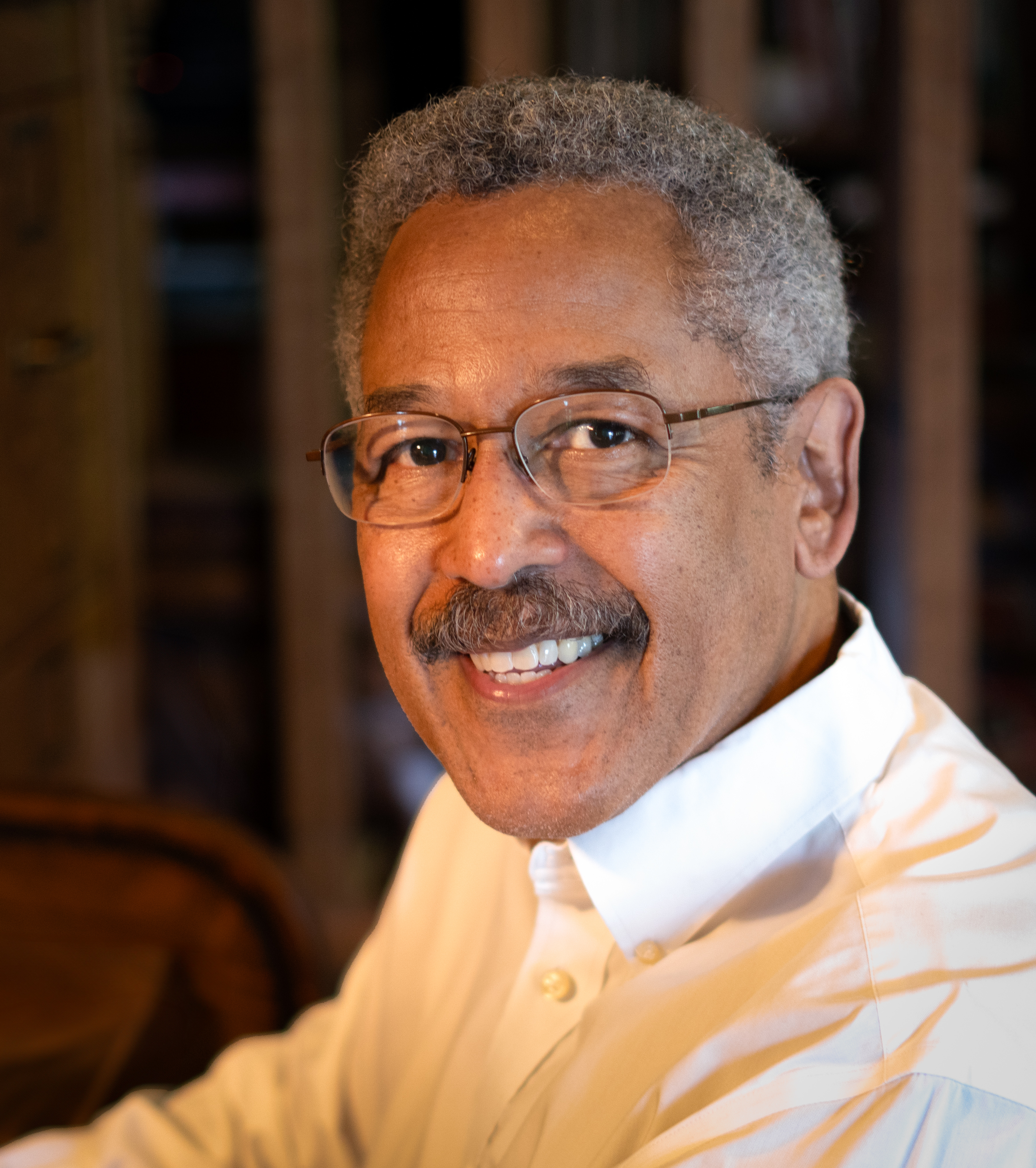
- Occupations: Veterinarian, author and academic

Academic background
- Education: Northwestern University; Tuskegee University; University of Minnesota
- Thesis: Canine calcium oxalate urolithiasis: Etiology, pathophysiology, and therapy (1992)

Jody Lulich is an American veterinarian, author and academic. He serves as an Osborne/Hills Endowed Chair in Nephrology and Urology, Director of Minnesota Urolith Center and Professor of Internal Medicine at the University of Minnesota (UMN).

Lulich's primary research interests lie in veterinary nephrology and urology, focusing on enhancing the diagnosis, treatment and prevention of urinary tract disorders in companion animals. His publications include over five hundred articles in scientific journals and several textbooks. He served as a Contributing Editor for four medical books and published a memoir titled In the Company of Grace: A Veterinarian's Memoir of Trauma and Healing, which delved into his veterinary career path. His contributions have earned him awards, including the Norden-Pfizer-Zoetis Distinguished Teacher Award, the Mark L. Morris Sr. Lifetime Achievement Award, and the Lifetime Achievement Award. At UMN, he was inducted into the Academy for Excellence in Clinical Practice and received the Award for Outstanding Contributions to Graduate and Professional Education.

Lulich is a Diplomat at the American College of Veterinary Internal Medicine and briefly served as a President of the R.O.C.K. (Research on Calculi Kinetics) Society from 2023 to 2024, being the first veterinarian to hold this office.

== Education ==
Lulich earned his Bachelor of Arts in biology from Northwestern University in 1979. He then completed his Doctor of Veterinary Medicine at Tuskegee University in 1984. Following this, he completed an internship in Companion Animal Medicine and Surgery at UMN in 1984 and continued there obtaining a Doctor of Philosophy in Veterinary Medicine in 1990.

== Career ==
Lulich served as an assistant professor in the Department of Veterinary Clinical Sciences at UMN from 1990 to 1996, after which he became an associate professor serving until 2002. Since 2008, he has been the Osborne/Hills Endowed Chair in Nephrology and Urology, the Director of the Minnesota Urolith Center while also holding the position of Professor of Internal Medicine at UMN.

== Works ==
Lulich authored his memoir In the Company of Grace to detail his life from a traumatic childhood to a career in veterinary medicine, exploring how his experiences with family trauma and racial identity shaped his approach to healing both animals and himself. Terri Schlichenmeyer, in her review for The Washington Informer, praised the book for being melancholic and challenging, noting that it offers a sense of triumph and meaningful reflection. His book was a finalist for the Minnesota Book Awards in the category of creative nonfiction.

== Research ==
Lulich's research has addressed urolithiasis, including the epidemiology, etiopathogenesis, dissolution, and prevention of calcium oxalate and other urolith types. His research interests also extend to urolith analysis and disease biomarkers using techniques such as NMR spectroscopy, proteomics, metabolomics, and genetics as well as exploring urinary tract oncology, clinical and translational research, spontaneous animal models for disease, and urinary tract infections.

Lulich's clinical work in internal medicine has focused on urological issues and advancing non-surgical treatments for urinary stones in pets. In 1993, he developed voiding urohydropropulsion, a non-invasive technique using fluid to quickly remove uroliths from the urinary bladder. He then investigated dietary factors influencing the formation of calcium oxalate (CaOx) and magnesium ammonium phosphate (MAP) uroliths in cats, finding that diets high in sodium increase the risk of CaOx uroliths while urine acidifying diets low in magnesium and phosphorus reduce the risk and enhance the dissolution of MAP uroliths. In the same year, he analyzed proportional morbidity rates (PMR) and risk factors for lower urinary tract diseases (LUTD) in cats using a large dataset.

Lulich has been advocating for minimally invasive techniques in the urology clinic to substantially reduce pain and shorten recovery times. Under a grant from the Focused Ultrasound Foundation, he and colleagues assessed a veterinary-specific ultrasound device for noninvasively fragmenting ureteral stones in cats, evaluating its safety and effectiveness. Additionally, his collaboration with engineers from the University of Washington led to the adaptation of burst wave lithotripsy technology for cats, effectively breaking up feline stones in under 10 minutes during laboratory tests.

== Awards and honors ==
- 2012 – Mark L. Morris Sr. Lifetime Achievement Award, Hill's Pet Nutrition
- 2020 – Outstanding Contributions to Graduate and Professional Education, University of Minnesota
- 2022 – Inducted in Academy for Excellence in Clinical Practice, University of Minnesota
- 2023 – The Specialty Lifetime Achievement Award for Small Animal Internal Medicine, American College of Veterinary Internal Medicine
- 2024 – Nominated for a Minnesota Book Award in Memoir and Creative Nonfiction for In the Company of Grace: A Veterinarian's Memoir of Trauma and Healing

== Personal life ==
Lulich was born in Chicago, Illinois, to a Black mother who died by suicide and a white father with whom he had an estranged relationship. At the age of nine, he faced a tragedy on the way to his mother's funeral when his father's car hit a dog that had darted out from an alley. This incident inspired him to pursue a career in veterinary medicine, with his personal loss influencing his work in the field. He lives with his husband in Roseville, Minnesota.

== Bibliography ==
=== Book ===
- In the Company of Grace: A Veterinarian's Memoir of Trauma and Healing (2023) ISBN 978-1517914196

=== Selected articles ===
- Lulich, J. P. (1992). Feline renal failure: questions, answers, questions. Comp Cont Educ Pract Vet, 14, 127–152.
- Lekcharoensuk, C., Osborne, C. A., & Lulich, J. P. (2001). Epidemiologic study of risk factors for lower urinary tract diseases in cats. Journal of the American Veterinary Medical Association, 218(9), 1429–1435.
- Lekcharoensuk, C., Osborne, C. A., Lulich, J. P., Pusoonthornthum, R., Kirk, C. A., Ulrich, L. K., ... & Swanson, L. L. (2001). Association between dietary factors and calcium oxalate and magnesium ammonium phosphate urolithiasis in cats. Journal of the American Veterinary Medical Association, 219(9), 1228–1237.
- Osborne, C. A., Lulich, J. P., Kruger, J. M., Ulrich, L. K., & Koehler, L. A. (2009). Analysis of 451,891 canine uroliths, feline uroliths, and feline urethral plugs from 1981 to 2007: perspectives from the Minnesota Urolith Center. Veterinary Clinics of North America: Small Animal Practice, 39(1), 183–197.
- Lulich, J. P., Berent, A. C., Adams, L. G., Westropp, J. L., Bartges, J. W., & Osborne, C. A. (2016). ACVIM small animal consensus recommendations on the treatment and prevention of uroliths in dogs and cats. Journal of veterinary internal medicine, 30(5), 1564–1574.
