= Elron Ventures =

Israeli technology holding company

Elron Electronic Industries Ltd.
- Type: Public
- Traded as: TASE: ELRN
- Industry: Medical technology, Telecommunications, Clean technology, Semiconductors, Information Technology
- Founded: 1962; 64 years ago
- Founder: Uzia Galil
- Headquarters: Haifa, Israel
- Key people: Lysia Bahar Manoah (chairman); Yaniv Schnieder (CEO)
- Revenue: ▲US$5 billion (2016)
- Website: www.elronventures.com

Elron Ventures (formerly Elron Electronic Industries Ltd.) is an Israeli technology holding company based in Tel Aviv; since 1962 the company has been involved in setting up, funding and developing over 30 companies and is considered one of the foundation stones of the high-tech industry in Israel. The company's sectors of interest include clean technology, software, semiconductors, medical technology, telecommunications, defence and aerospace. Today, the combined annual revenues of the companies established by Elron are approximately $5 billion.

== History ==
=== Early years ===
Elron was founded in 1962 by Uzia Galil, with the support of Dan Tolkowsky of the Discount Investment Corporation. Uzia Galil graduated from the Technion – Israel Institute of Technology in 1947, and in 1948 joined the Israel Navy as an officer responsible for maintaining its Radio systems. In 1952 Uzia was sent to study for a master's degree in Electrical Engineering at Purdue University in the United States. During his studies in the United States, he worked at Motorola's research lab and was part of a team that developed of one of the world's first colour televisions. But in 1954 he had to return to Israel to complete another 4 years of service in Navy, which financed his studies.

=== Founding Elron ===
Uzia Galil's short experience working for Motorola in the United States exposed him to the technology industry and he decided to establish Israel's first high tech Startup company. He started the company, while still serving in Navy, in a friend's (Benjamin Sandller) flat in Haifa, later joined by another friend (Gideon Kirshner), who was a teacher at the Haifa Technical High-School, and worked with them in his spare time. The company's first products were measurement instruments for medical and electronic applications. In 1958 Uzia left the Navy, however the company did not generate enough revenues and he got a job at the Physics laboratory of the Technion; while there Moshe Arens, who was Professor of Aeronautics at the time, introduced him to Dan Tolkowsky. Dan, who was fascinated by Uzia's ideas, managed to convince the board of Discount Investment Corporation to provide the capital required to properly fund the company. Elron was officially formed in 1962 with an initial capital of $US 160,000, and within 3 years generated annual revenues of $1 million.

=== First joint venture – Elbit Computers Ltd. ===
In 1966, Shimon Peres, who at the time was the deputy defence minister, visited Elron and Uzia convinced him to establish a new company that will develop minicomputers for defence applications. The new company, initially called Elbit Computers, was a joint venture with the Israel's Ministry of Defence and Elron (each holding 50% of the company). The company launched its first product in 1967 the Elbit-100 minicomputer. The company evolved through the years to become the multinational defence electronics company – Elbit Systems (Nasdaq: ELBT).

=== Founding Elscint ===
In 1969, Uzia convinced a talented engineer, Avraham Suhami, who just completed his PhD at the Technion, to join him and start a new company that will focus on the development of medical and scientific solutions, a new company – Elscint, a contraction of the words "electronic" and "scientific", was established again with the support of Dan Tolkowsky. The company developed medical imaging equipment, such as MRI and CT scanners. In 1972 Elscint was the first Israeli company to have an initial public offering on NASDAQ. By 1996, Elscint's revenues reached $311 million.

=== Growth during the 1980s and 1990s ===
In 1981 Elron was involved in the establishment of a company that will later become Orbotech (Nasdaq: ORBK) a manufacturer of equipment for the Printed Circuit Board (PCB), TFT& LCD assembly industries.

In 1983 Uzia met by chance, while waiting for a flight in the lounge of Ben Gurion International Airport, Levy Gerzberg an academic from Stanford University, who in 1981 founded Zoran Corporation (Zoran stands for "silicon" in Hebrew), which develops digital signal processing solutions. At the time Levy Gerzberg was looking for additional funding, which Elron was able to provide. In 1995, Zoran had an initial public offering on NASDAQ (Nasdaq: ZRAN) and later was the leading provider of complete OEM solutions for consumer electronics products, such as DVD and digital cameras, with annual revenues of over $500 million in 2007.

In 1996, Elbit spun off into three independent companies:

- Elbit Medical Imaging Nasdaq: EMITF – during 1999 and 2000 both Elscint and Elbit Medical Imaging sold their imaging activities to General Electric Medical Systems NYSE: GE and to Picker (now part of Philips Medical Systems, NYSE: PHG for approximately $600 million.
- Elbit Systems – Created as the defence electronics arm of Elbit and had an Initial public offering on NASDAQ.
- Elbit – which focused on communications activities and in 1999 led the consortium that founded Partner Communications Company Ltd., Israel's first GSM operator Nasdaq: PTNR. In 2002 Elbit was merged into Elron. Elron sold its shares in Partner during 2003–2006 for approximately $160 million.

In 1998, Given Imaging (Nasdaq: GIVN), a developer of a video capsule for medical diagnostics, was founded.

=== 2000s ===
During the 2000s, Elron started operating less as holding company and moved to act more as a venture capital fund, jointly investing in numerous start-up companies and realizing the investment by selling the companies or conducting an initial public offering. Notable investments and investment exits include:

- Elron Software – a provider of spam, email and web filtering solutions, sold to Zix Corp.
- Oren Semiconductor – a fabless integrated circuits manufacturer that designs and develops integrated circuits for the digital television and set-top box markets, sold to Zoran Corporation.
- Galil Medical – a developer of cryotherapy solutions.
- SELA Semiconductor Engineering Laboratories – a provider of automated sample preparation tools for semiconductor manufacturers, sold to Camtek Intelligent Imaging.
- 3DV Systems – developers of the ZCam, a time-of-flight camera products for video applications, sold to Microsoft.
- Medingo – developer of a micro pump insulin delivery system consists of two parts: a semi-disposable insulin dispensing patch and a remote control, which allows for discreet personalised insulin delivery. The company was sold to Hoffmann-La Roche's subsidiary Roche Diagnostics for $160 million, as well as up to $40 million in milestone payments.
- Safend – a leading provider of endpoint data protection solutions was sold to Wave Systems.
- Wavion – a provider of outdoor Wi-Fi applications for metro and rural areas, acquired by Alvarion.

== Current holdings ==
In 2012, Elron celebrated its 50th anniversary and announced that it is refocusing solely on Medical Devices investment. As of 2013, it has holding in 7 companies in this market, including:

- Given Imaging – a developer of a video capsule for medical diagnostics
- Brainsgate – a medical device company developing a novel treatment modality, electrical SPG stimulation
- Pocared – a developer of a real-time, fully automated laboratory system for the microbiology market

== Former holdings and spin-offs ==
- Elbit Systems – defence and aerospace group
- Elscint – an early developer of CT and MRI solution
- Elbit Medical Imaging
- Elbit Vision Systems – manufacture of computerised vision and imaging systems for in-line inspection and monitoring of production processes
- Zoran Corporation – a fabless semiconductor company specialising in solutions for digital TV and DVD products
- NetManage – a software company founded in 1990 and sold in 2008 to Micro Focus International
- Partner Communications Company Ltd. – a mobile and fixed line operator in Israel (operating under the Orange brand name)
- NetVision – a leading Internet and Telephony service provider in Israel
- Orbotech – a manufacturer of equipment for the Printed Circuit Board (PCB), TFT& LCD assembly industries
- Elron Telesoft – a software provider for telecommunication operators sold to ECtel of the ECI Telecom group in 2005

== See also ==
- Silicon Wadi
- List of Israeli companies listed on the Nasdaq
