= James D. Meindl =

American engineer (1933–2020)

- Born: April 20, 1933
- Died: June 7, 2020 (aged 87)
- Education: Carnegie Mellon University (BS, MS, PhD)
- Awards: NAE (1978); J. J. Ebers Award (1980); IEEE Solid-State Circuits Award (1989); IEEE James H. Mulligan, Jr. Education Medal (1990); IEEE Medal of Honor (2006)
- Scientific career
- Fields: Electrical engineering
- Workplaces: Stanford University; Rensselaer Polytechnic Institute; Georgia Institute of Technology
- Doctoral advisor: Edward R. Schatz
- Doctoral students: William R. Brody; Levy Gerzberg; Roger Melen; Jim Plummer; L. Rafael Reif; T. J. Rodgers; Krishna Saraswat

James Donald Meindl (April 20, 1933 – June 7, 2020) was director of the Joseph M. Pettit Microelectronics Research Center and the Marcus Nanotechnology Research Center and Pettit Chair Professor of Microelectronics at the Georgia Institute of Technology in Atlanta, Georgia. He won the 2006 IEEE Medal of Honor "for pioneering contributions to microelectronics, including low power, biomedical, physical limits and on-chip interconnect networks.”

== Education ==
He received his Bachelor of Science, Master of Science and Doctor of Philosophy degrees in Electrical Engineering from Carnegie-Mellon University in 1955, 1956 and 1958 respectively.

== Career ==
From 1965 to 1967, he was the founding Director of the Integrated Electronics Division at the Fort Monmouth, New Jersey, US Army Electronics Laboratories. In 1967 he was appointed John M. Fluke Professor of Electrical Engineering at Stanford University before becoming vice provost of research.

He went on to serve as Associate Dean for Research in the School of Engineering; Director of the Center for Integrated Systems; and was the founding Director of the Integrated Circuits Laboratory. He was appointed Senior Vice President for Academic Affairs and Provost of Rensselaer Polytechnic Institute in 1986 and served in there until 1993.

Meindl's fellowships include the IEEE and the AAAS and he was elected a member of the National Academy of Engineering in 1978.

He is also a co-founder of Telesensory Systems, Inc., a manufacturer of electronic reading aids for the blind. Meindl also served on the board of directors of SanDisk Corporation and Zoran Corporation and previously of Stratex Networks.

== Notable students ==
Among his more than 80 doctoral students include T. J. Rodgers, founder of Cypress Semiconductor, William R. Brody, president of Johns Hopkins University, Levy Gerzberg, founder of Zoran Corporation, Roger Melen founder of Cromemco, Jim Plummer, dean of engineering at Stanford University, L. Rafael Reif, President of MIT, Richard Swanson, founder of SunPower Corporation, Steve Combs, founder of Maxim Integrated Products, Nicky Lu, founder of Etron Technology and Krishna Saraswat, professor at Stanford University.
