= The Tumor =

2015 short story by John Grisham

- Author: John Grisham
- Language: English
- Genre: short story
- Publisher: Focused Ultrasound Foundation
- Publication date: December 4, 2015
- Publication place: United States
- Media type: Print, eBook
- Pages: 48
- ISBN: 978-1-4951-7940-2 (Paperback)

"The Tumor" is a short story by John Grisham, telling about the focused ultrasound process through the case of a fictional character named Paul. This story was not released through Grisham's usual publisher, but instead was published for a free eBook on the website of the Focused Ultrasound Foundation, on whose board Grisham serves. Grisham's purpose in writing this short story was to increase awareness about the promising new medical therapy. The use of focused ultrasound is not yet approved for use on brain tumors, but The Tumor takes place in a time when the therapy is in regular use. Unlike most short stories, the story is as much informational as narrative, and includes medical illustrations and brain scan images. The book's cover includes the subtitle A Non-Legal Thriller. On Grisham's website, in a letter introducing The Tumor, Grisham states "It's the most important book I've ever written."

== Plot ==
Paul is a 35-year-old man with a family, who is in good health. His brain develops a tumor, which causes gradual impaired function of his left side, and eventually a complete blackout. He is diagnosed with glioma, the severity unknown. Paul undergoes the most effective treatment currently available, which involves brain surgery to remove the tumor, followed by chemotherapy and radiation treatments. Following the surgery his tumor is diagnosed as malignant cancer, a full-on glioblastoma. Paul's doctor informs him that the average life expectancy after this diagnosis is approximately 12 months. Side effects of the cancer treatments prevent Paul from fully resuming his daily life, including his inability to go into work. In 6 months, the tumor reappears, treatments become ineffective, and Paul dies 9 months after the initial diagnosis.

Paul's story is then retold, supposing that he had been born 10 years later. At the time of the discovery of his brain tumor, in 2025, medical treatment has advanced such that his glioblastoma is immediately diagnosed, and focused ultrasound treatment is available for treating it. Paul receives the treatment as a non-invasive outpatient procedure. The treatment is so effective, he is able to return to work and resume his normal activities. Three years later, the tumor returns, and Paul gets the focused ultrasound therapy again, with similarly positive results. Four years after that, the tumor regrows again, and Paul receives the treatment a third time.

At this point, the narrative ends and Grisham acknowledges that eventually, the cancerous brain tumor will kill Paul. But the extension of Paul's life and greatly reduced medical bills is worth it. Following this, Grisham explains the details of focused ultrasound therapy, including how it works, how far along the research and testing is for its application in various medical diagnoses, and what obstacles remain for its widespread adoption. The book concludes with an introduction to the Focused Ultrasound Foundation and an appeal for support from the reader.

== Reception ==
Because The Tumor was not released through a traditional publisher, nor a typical novella or short story, few literary reviews of the story are available. However, several reviews from the medical community have been received. Ed Miller, M.D., of Johns Hopkins, stated "[Grisham] has pulled an exciting new medical technology out of the labs of academic research and onto the pages of an enlightening book. He paints a great picture of how sound waves may shape the future of medicine." CBS news stated the book is more likely to be found shelved with the medical texts than with mystery novels.

Some readers felt misled by the story's subtitle A Non-Legal Thriller, one calling the story "a 50 page sales pitch." Grisham's publisher, editor, and agent all advised him not to publish the free short story, fearing it would tarnish his image as a writer of thriller novels. Grisham published it anyway because of his belief that increased awareness could speed up research and approval of focused ultrasound, helping many patients. He has stated "If it finds a much bigger market, if it finds people to push our research to get us there, that's the purpose of the book."
