= ADAC (disambiguation) =

ADAC, or Allgemeiner Deutscher Automobil-Club e.V., is the German automobile association.

ADAC may also refer to:

- ADAC GT Masters, a grand tourer-based auto racing series
- ADAC Laboratories, a medical device company
