= Orbotech =

Israeli electronics company

Orbotech Ltd.
- Type: Subsidiary
- Traded as: Nasdaq: ORBK
- Industry: Electronics
- Founded: 1981; 45 years ago
- Founder: Shlomo Barak; Yochai Richter; Kobi Richter; Prof. Shimon Ullman; Zvi Lapidot; Ami Caspi
- Headquarters: Yavne, Israel
- Key people: Gil Oron (CEO)
- Number of employees: 2,400 (2019)
- Parent: KLA Corporation (2019–present)
- Divisions: Printed Circuit Boards; Flat Panel Displays
- Subsidiaries: Orbograph Ltd. Orbotech LT Solar, LLC; Frontline PCB Solutions Ltd.
- Website: orbotech.com

Orbotech Ltd. a subsidiary of KLA Corporation and a technology company used in the manufacturing of consumer and industrial products throughout the electronics and adjacent industries. The company providing electronics reading, writing, and connecting solutions used by manufacturers of printed circuit boards, flat panel displays, advanced packaging, micro-electro-mechanical systems and other electronic components. The company is headquartered in Yavne, Israel and operates in North America, Europe, Japan and Asia-Pacific.

== Corporate history ==
=== Early years ===
Optrotech, one of the two companies which eventually merged to create Orbotech, was founded in 1981 by a team of engineers at Electro-Optical Industry Ltd. (El-Op) led by Shlomo Barak, who was developing electro-optical systems for military use, but saw commercial use for them as well. The company received financial backing from Uzia Galil of Elron Electronic Industries, an Israeli holding company. After 18 months of development, Optrotech was first to market with its first-generation Automated optical inspection product, although a number of other companies also had been working on their own automated inspection systems.

As the first to market, Optrotech was able to become the market leader in its field helping transform the printed circuit board industry, enabling companies to begin the first of a series of productivity improvements. The faster production times and greater volumes helped drive costs down, and the steadily dropping prices of printed circuit boards provided still further stimulation for the development of the global electronics and computer industries.

In 1983, a fellow Israeli company Orbot was founded by brothers Yochai and Kobi Richter, Shimon Ullman, Zvi Lapidot and Ami Caspi; with the financial backing of Ormat Industries. Orbot successfully launched competing automated optical inspection solutions.

In 1984 Optrotech had an initial public offering on NASDAQ raising $10 million USD. The funds raised enabled Optrotech to develop the next generation of its automated optical inspection technology and launched an effort to diversify its market, beginning development of its first CAD/CAM system.

=== Merger of Optrotech and Orbot ===
In 1991, due to a slowdown in the global AOI market Optrotech and Orbot started discussing a merge of their complementary operations. In August 1992, Optrotech and Orbot reached a merger agreement, in which Orbot absorbed Optrotech, excluding its semiconductor subsidiary Orbot Instruments (which was later sold to Applied Materials). The resulting business was then renamed Orbotech and managed to capture 70 percent of the AOI market.

=== Growth by diversification and acquisitions ===
In 1995, Orbotech adapted its technology to provide automatic check processing solutions for financial institutions, launching a new subsidiary Orbograph Ltd.

In 1996, Orbotech established a joint venture with Germany's Jenoptik AG, to develop a laser-based direct imaging system for the production of PCB prototypes. The partnership came under full ownership of Orbotech in 2000.

In 1997, Orbotech acquired the AOI business of Germany's W. Schuh GmbH, a company that specialized in the production of assembled printed circuit board inspection equipment.

In 1998, Orbotech boosted its presence in Japan by acquiring Toyo Ink Manufacturing's PCB sales and marketing operations, as well as Toyo's computer-aided manufacturing (CAM) product line, which was developed by its Israeli subsidiary EIT.

In 1998, Orbotech entered into an agreement with Valor Computerized Systems Ltd. (which is now part of Mentor Graphics), to form Frontline PCB Solutions, a joint venture that develops CAM software for PCB fabrication. Frontline PCB Solutions is owned equally by Orbotech and Mentor Graphics.

==== Entry into the flat panel display market ====
During the 1990s Orbotech started developing a new automatic inception product line to support the new, fast growing, market of Liquid crystal display (LCD) flat panel displays. In 1999, Orbotect acquired Japan's KLA Acrotec from the KLA-Tencor Corporation, which enabled the company to develop a leading position in the LCD Inception market.

=== 2000s ===
In 2001, Orbotech established its own venture capital arm, Orbotech Technology Ventures Ltd., in order to invest in technology start-ups.

In 2004, as part of the company’s strategy of diversifying into new growth areas for imaging technologies, Orbotech established a new subsidiary Orbotech Medical Solutions Ltd., to focus on the medical market. In 2005, Orbotech Medical acquired Imarad, a privately held Israeli company that developed a technology to manufacture high performance, solid state cadmium zinc telluride gamma radiation detectors, for $7.0 million; and in 2007 Orbotech Medical acquired 3D Danish Diagnostic Development A/S, a privately held Danish company engaged in the development, manufacture and sale of gamma cameras for use in nuclear cardiac imaging, for approximately $41.0 million.

In October 2010, Orbotech entered into an agreement with General Electric in which it sold Orbotech Medical Solutions to a subsidiary of GE, GE Medical Systems Israel Ltd. (formerly Elscint Ltd.).

In 2009, Orbotech's Assembly Automated Optical Inspection (AOI) division, which had been started in 1997 by the acquisition of Schuh GmbH, was spun off into a separate company, ORPRO Vision GmbH. The company sells self-contained machines for production line inspection in the automotive electronics, telecommunication, aerospace, medical and industrial electronics industries.

In September 2011, Orbotech's subsidiary Orbograph diversified into healthcare revenue cycle management through the acquisition of Correct Claims Now, a company providing healthcare payments processing services.

In July 2014, Orbotech acquired British company SPTS Technologies, a manufacturer of equipment used to produce Micro ElectroMechanical Systems (MEMS) and semiconductor devices, for total consideration of $371 million.

In March 2018, semiconductor company KLA-Tencor announced that it would buy Orbotech for a price of $38.86 in cash and 0.25 of a share of KLA-Tencor common stock in exchange for each ordinary share of Orbotech, implying a total consideration of approximately $69.02 per share, a 10% premium on the share price.

In February 2019 KLA completed the acquisition of Orbotech.

== See also ==
- Automated optical inspection
- Elron Electronic Industries
- Ormat Industries
- Silicon Wadi
