= ADAC Laboratories =

American medical device company

- Industry: Medical Devices
- Founded: 1970; 56 years ago
- Defunct: 2000
- Fate: Acquired by Philips
- Headquarters: United States
- Number of employees: 720

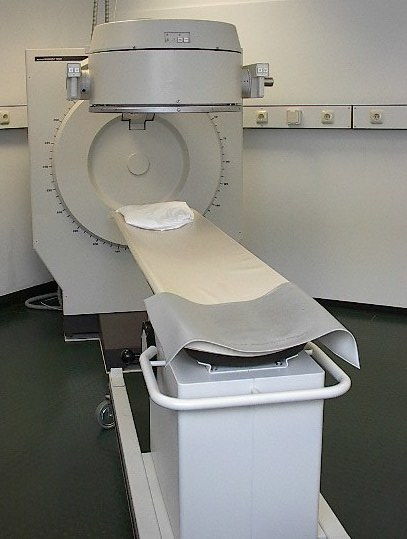
ARC 3000 Gantry & Patient Table

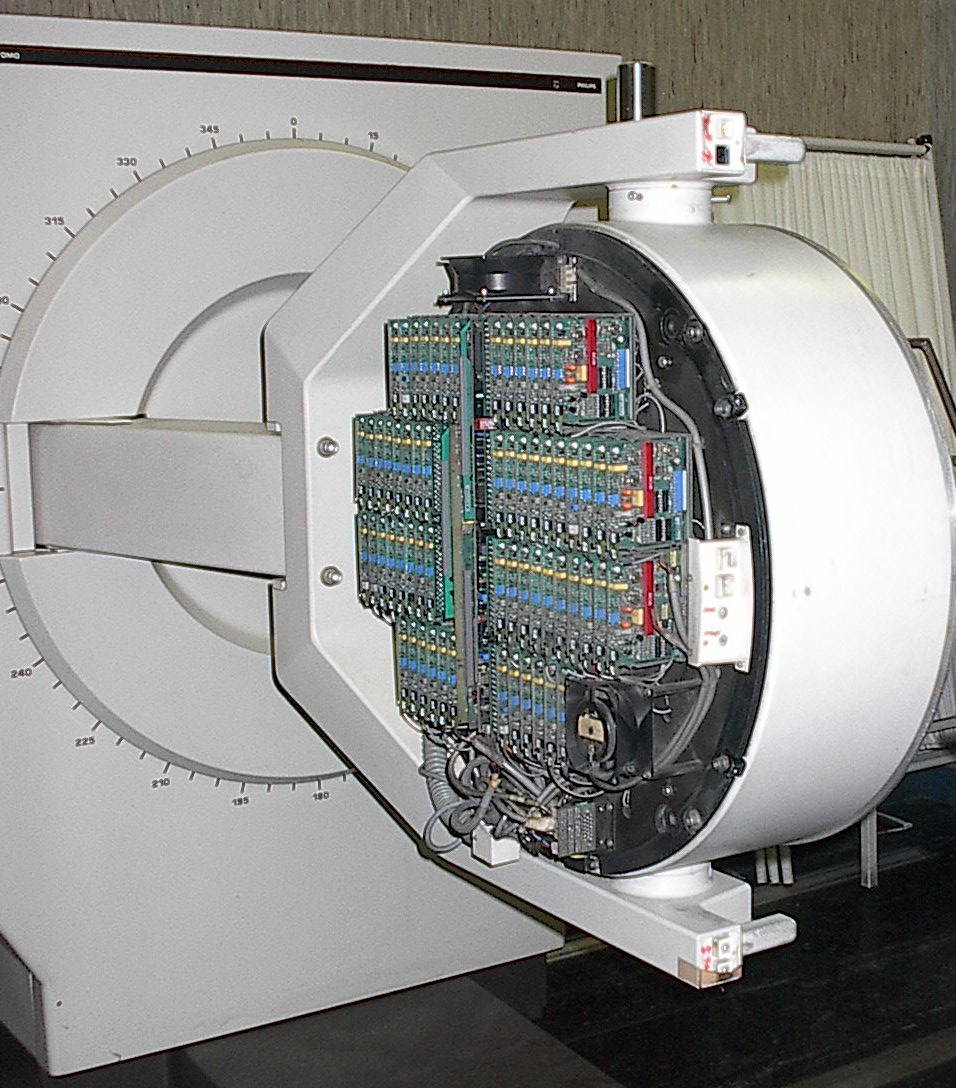
ARC 3000 showing detector printed circuit boards

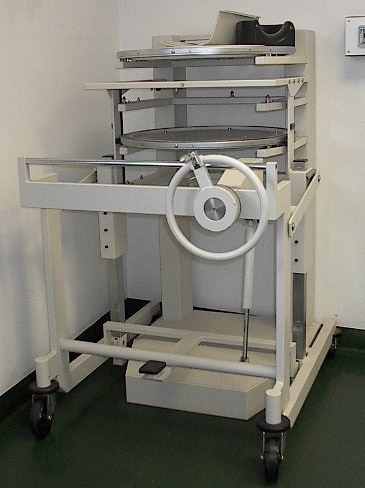
ARC 3000 Mobile Collimator Cart & Storage Rack

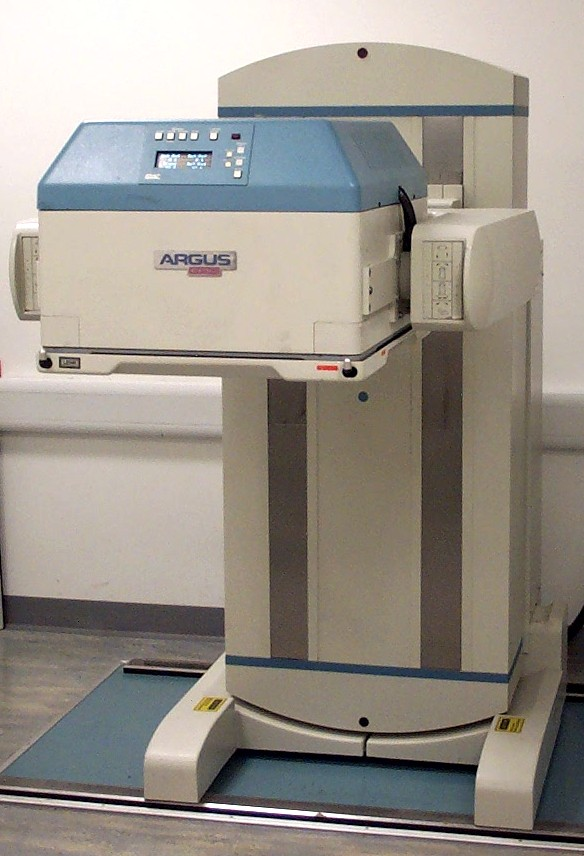
Argus single head gamma camera

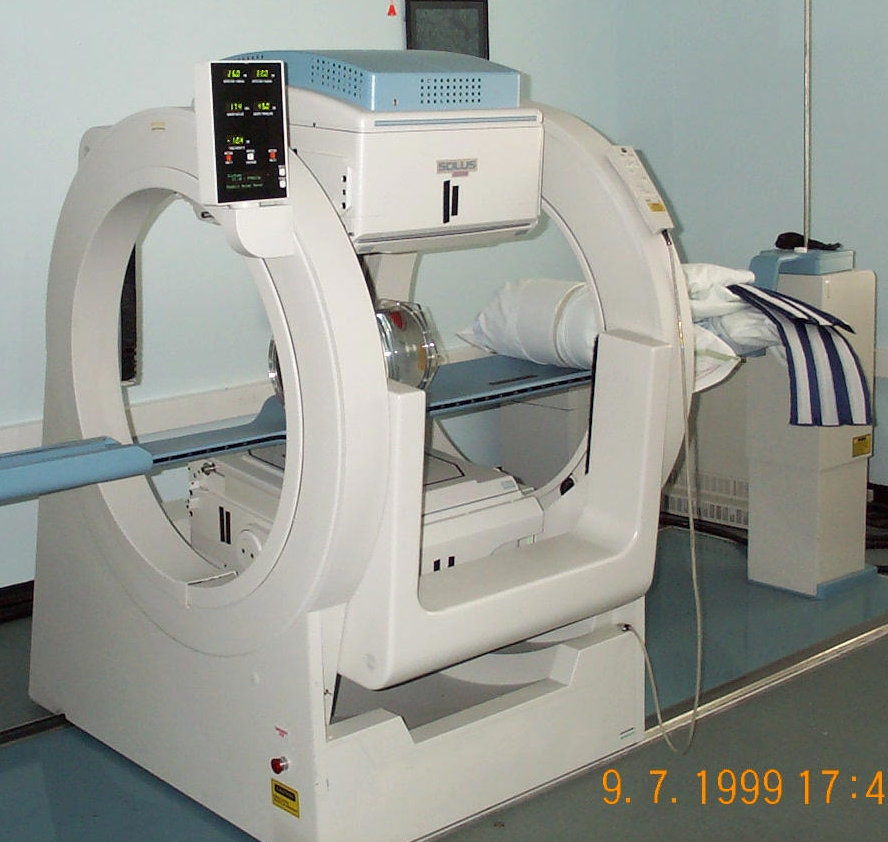
Solus dual head gamma camera

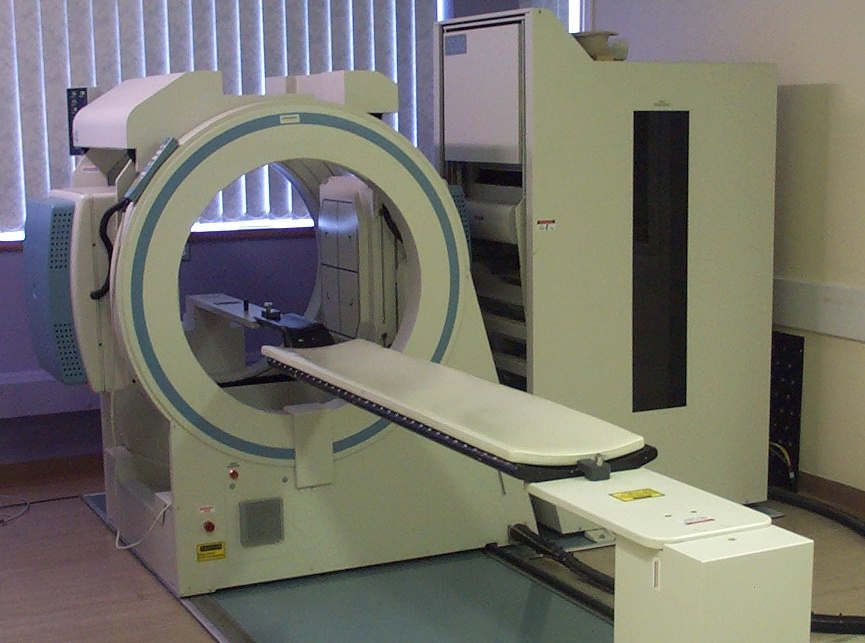
Vertex MCD gamma camera with automatic exchanger

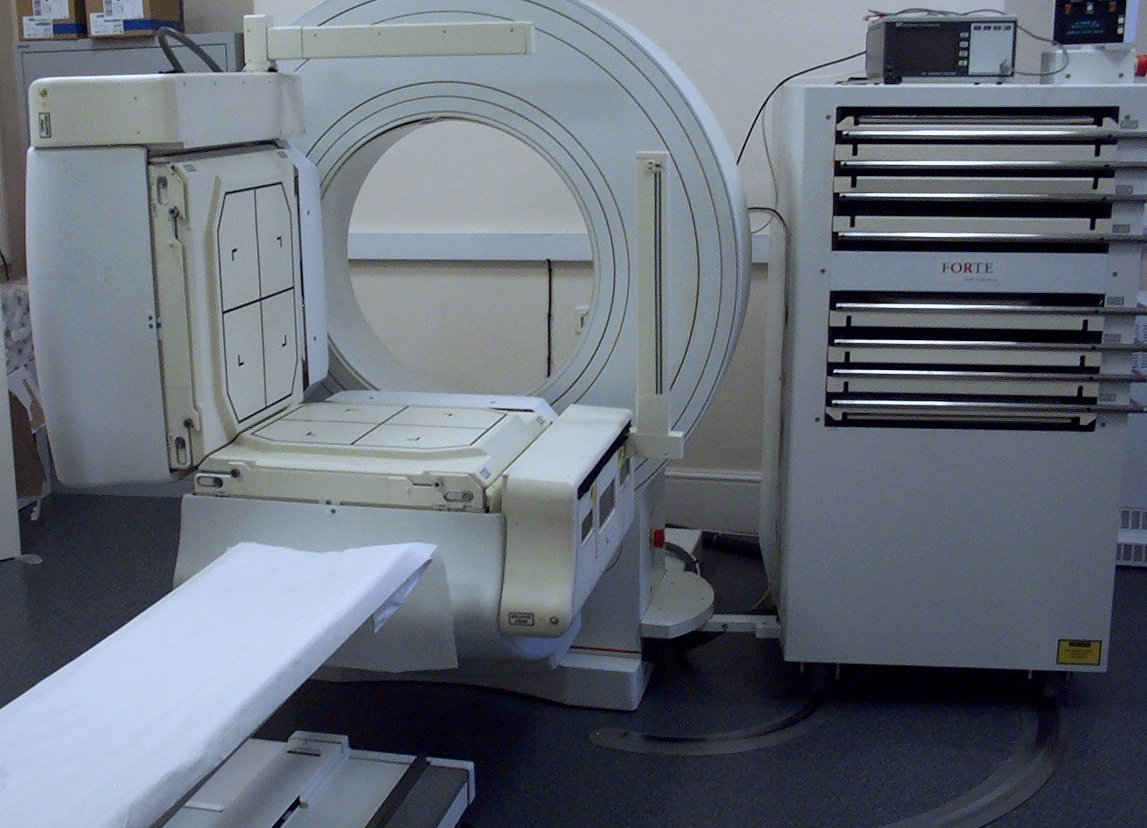
Forte dual head gamma camera

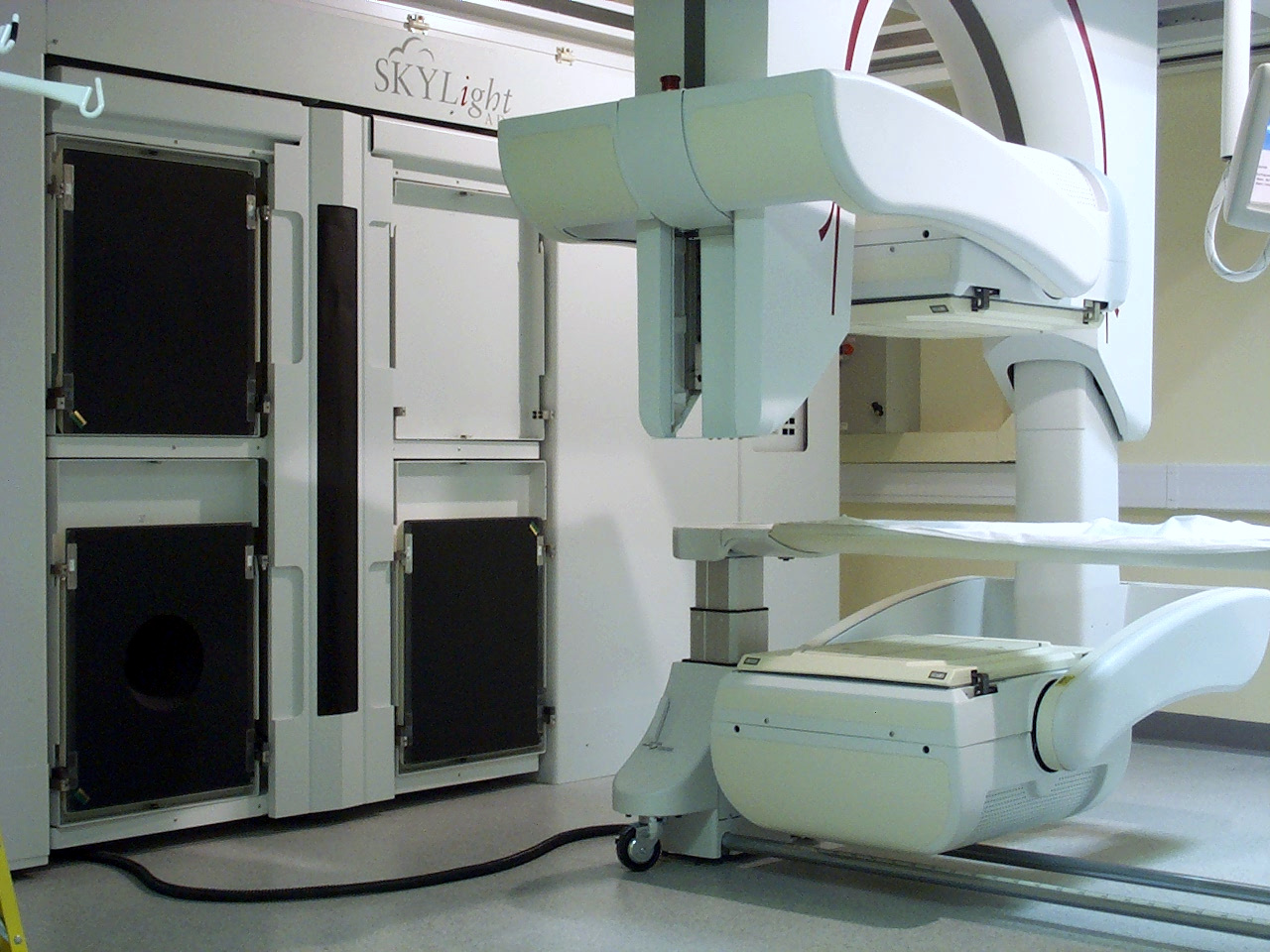
Skylight dual headed gamma camera

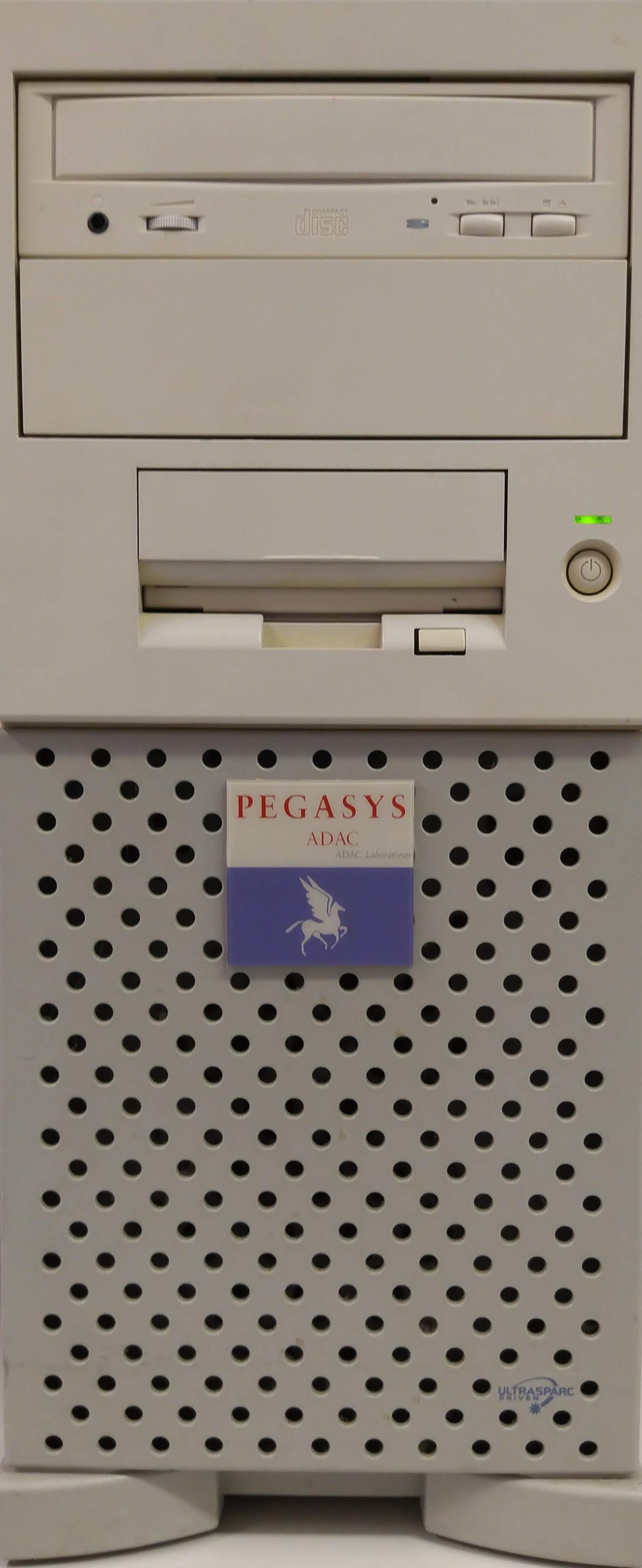
Pegasys Ultra 10

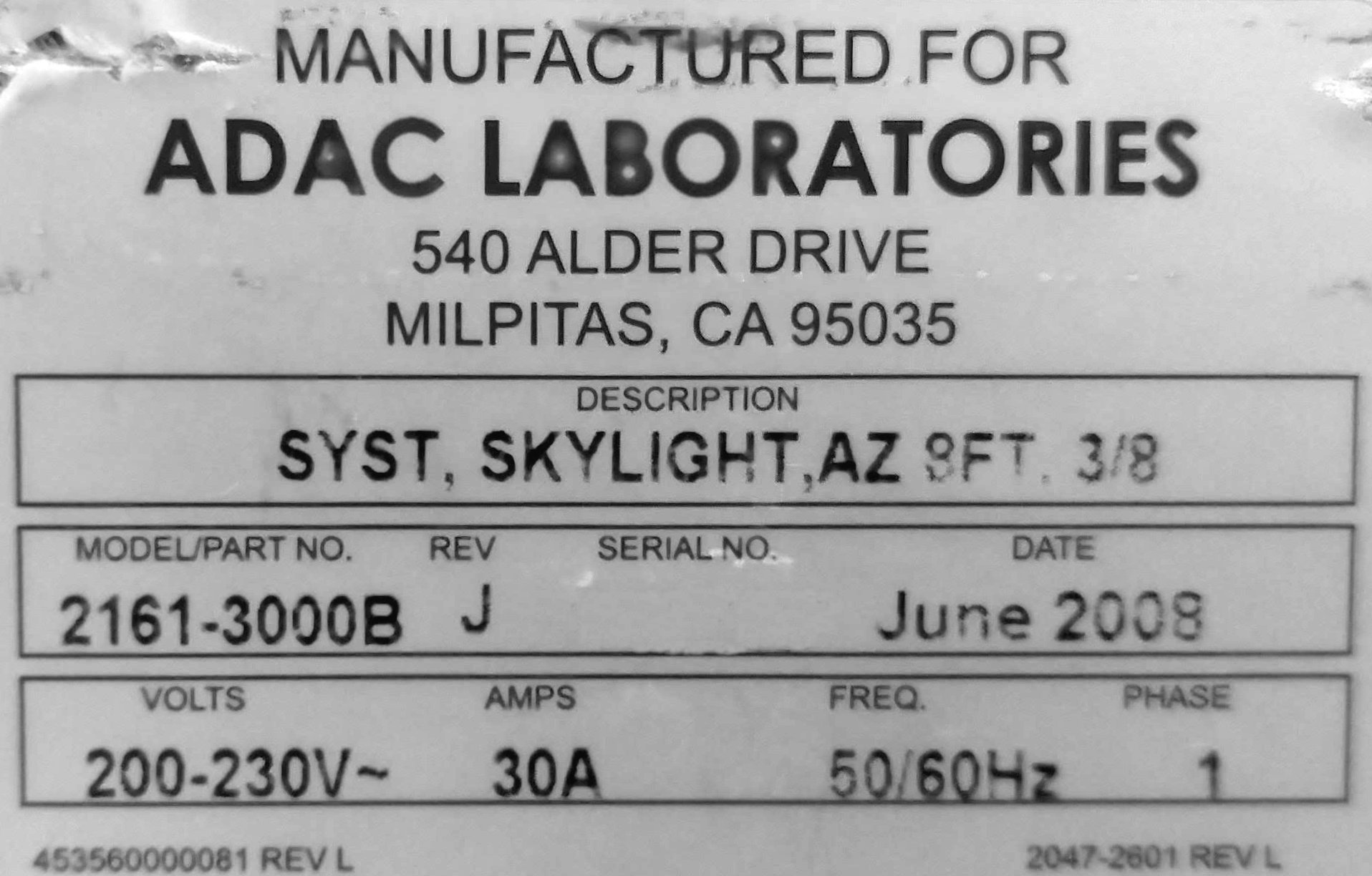
Skylight serial number label on 2008 manufactured system showing ADAC Laboratories Milpitas address.

ADAC Laboratories was a Silicon Valley medical device company specialising in nuclear medicine gamma camera manufacturing and associated nuclear medicine processing computers and software. It was originally located at 10300 Bubb Road, Cupertino, California, 95014, then as the company expanded moved in turn to the following locations. 4747 Hellyer Avenue, San Jose, CA 951, then 255 San Geronimo Way, Sunnyvale, CA, then from ~1993, 540 Alder Drive Milpitas, CA 95035. Although most people called the company ADAC or adaclabs, the name ADAC was an acronym of Analytical Development Associates Corporation. It was incorporated in California on October 14, 1970.

In the early years ADAC developed both small nuclear medicine related hardware and software products but between 1975 and the 1980s, become better known for their computer systems such as the CDS and DPS acquisition and processing systems. In 1987–88 ADAC maintained Philips ARC gamma camera installed base under licence and In ~1991 Philips exited the nuclear medicine market. At that time, the Dutch vendor licensed its nuclear technology to both ADAC and Digital Design of France". The 1990s were the dominant decade for ADAC in terms of gamma camera production, manufacturing the Argus, Genesys, Polaris, Thyrus, Transcam, Vertex, Forte and Skylight gamma cameras as well as the EPIC detector and molecular coincidence detection (MCD) option, along with the Pegasys nuclear medicine processing workstation and radiation treatment planning systems (RTP). In 1993 it was sued by Elscint for patent infringement and in 1994 purchased Philips' nuclear medicine patent portfolio, consisting of 13 U.S. patents and 56 foreign patents and patent applications. "ADAC announced it had filed a patent infringement claim against Elscint in U.S. District Court in San Jose, California, charging Elscint with violating the Philips patents. ADAC filed the lawsuit in direct response to the Elscint litigation". In 1996, ADAC was the recipient of a Malcolm Baldrige National Quality Award and during that year employed 720 people worldwide.

ADAC Laboratories was acquired by Philips in 2000 for $426 million, and incorporated into Philips Medical Systems (later Philips Healthcare). ADAC continued to operate from the Milpitas location until around 2006 and was submitting FDA pre-market filings under the company name ADAC Laboratories, Milpitas, until 2006, whereupon the 540 Alder Drive, Milpitas operation was closed and ADAC become fully integrated into the Philips organisation.

== Products ==
=== Network based Nuclear Medicine Analysis and early products ===
Year	Product	Description	Notes
1972	Mednet	Network based Nuclear Medicine Analysis (off site)	
1972	Patient Positioning Chair for Mednet System		
1974	RP/ED (Renal Perfusion/Excretion Determination)	Software based feature for Mednet product	
1974	AW 1450 automatic well counter	Isotometer well counter	
-	Gamma Probes	Such as model PA-6	
-	Interface Instrumentation		
1975	ADAC MUS 10	Mobile uptake system, thyroid uptake, cardiac output, clearance studies such as kidney & liver. Includes Spectrometer/scaler model SS-101, single probe stand on wheels, model SPS-4 and a gamma probe, model PA-6. Optional teleprinter on mobile cart, model ASR-33, ADAC Lister, model ADL-150	

=== Nuclear Medicine Acquisition/Processing and Processing Only Workstations ===
Year	Product	Description	Notes
1975	Clinical Data System I (CDS I)	ADAC first advertised computer for less than $30,000 with 32K memory (Dec 1975)	Hardware unknown but probably DEC based.
1976	Clinical Data System II (CDS II)	Similar to ADAC's clinical Data System I but with an increase in memory to 40K x 16, dual 7" and 9" displays instead of a single display, 64 shades of gray, 512x512 image matrix, light pen with eight regions of interest (ROI's), dual 8" floppy disc drives. High speed 110 characters/sec printer, clinical software packages, in vivo & in vitro data analysis, optional extras: third disk drive which allows simultaneous processing while acquiring data, 64k x 16 memory, 8" x 10" film camera, Polaroid camera, FORTRAN IV compiler, paper tape reader for input of RIA, high speed disk drive for list mode and mass storage, remote dual displays, color display, image transmission via telephone, Microdot (Serale TM) interface.	
1980	System I, II, III and IV	Nuclear Medicine Acquisition and Processing Workstation	Based on DEC hardware.
1985	DPS 3300 Micro	Nuclear Medicine Acquisition and Processing Workstation, Ethernet (10BASE5) can be used to connect multiple DPS 3300 micros together. Includes one 5.25" floppy disc drive.	Based on DEC 11/23 hardware with RT11 O.S.
-	DPS 33000	Nuclear Medicine Processing Workstation	Based on DEC hardware with RT11 O.S.
1988	Viewpoint	Remote viewing station	MicroVAX system?
1988	Centor	-	MicroVax system
1989	PegasysX	Nuclear Medicine Processing Workstation	Based on Sun Solaris
1995	Pegasys Ultra 1	Nuclear Medicine Processing Workstation	Based on Sun Solaris
1997	Pegasys Ultra 60	Nuclear Medicine Processing Workstation	Based on Sun Solaris
1998	Pegasys Ultra 10	Nuclear Medicine Processing Workstation	Based on Sun Solaris
-	Pegasys HD	Nuclear Medicine Processing Workstation	Based on Sun Solaris
2001	Pegasys Blade 150	Nuclear Medicine Processing Workstation	Based on Sun Solaris
2004	Jetstream Workspace (2004)	PC, Windows O.S.	Post Philips acquisition but FDA pre-market filings as ADAC Laboratories, Alder Dr., Milpitas.

=== Digital Radiography Systems ===
Year	Product	Description	Notes
1982	DPS 2800	Digital Processing System	510(k) premarket notification, decision 07/Feb/1982[ Applicant: ADAC Laboratories, Jellingvej 5, 92320 Svenstrup, Denmark, DK
1982	DPS 4050	Digital Radiography System	510(k) premarket notification, decision 06/Sep/1982 Applicant: ADAC Laboratories, Jellingvej 5, 92320 Svenstrup, Denmark, DK
1982	DPS 6100	Multi Modality Digital Processing System	510(k) premarket Notification, Decision 07/Sep/1982 Applicant: ADAC Laboratories, Jellingvej 5, 92320 Svenstrup, Denmark, DK
1983	PDX-4800	Electronic Image Processing and Recording Apparatus which Converts Conventional X-Rays to a Digital Format	510(k) premarket notification, decision 03/Jan/1983 Applicant: ADAC Laboratories, Jellingvej 5, 92320 Svenstrup, Denmark, DK
1984	DPS 7100	Digital Radiography System	510(k) premarket notification, decision 10/Jan/1984 Applicant: ADAC Laboratories, 803 N. Front St. Suite 3, Mchenry, IL 60050
1985	DPS 4070	Digital Radiography System	510(k) premarket notification, decision 16/Apr/1985 Applicant: ADAC Laboratories, 4747 Hellyer Avenue, San Jose, CA 95138.
1988	DTV-4114	Fluoroscopic Television Camera	510(k) premarket notification, decision 18/May/1988 Applicant: ADAC Laboratories, 540 Alder Drive, Milpitas, CA 95035.

=== Gamma Cameras ===
Year	Product	Description	Notes
-	ARC 3000	Single detector.	
1987	ARC 5000	Single detector.	510(k) premarket notification, decision 30/Oct/1987 Applicant: ADAC Laboratories, 540 Alder Drive, Milpitas, CA 95035.
1988	Genesys SH	Single rectangular detector, dual ring gantry design.	
1990	Genesys DH	Dual rectangular detectors, dual ring gantry design.	
1991	Cirrus	Single detector	510(k) premarket notification, decision 23/Oct/1991 Applicant: ADAC Laboratories, 540 Alder Drive, Milpitas, CA 95035.
1993	Argus analogue detector	Single rectangular detector 20"x15".	
1993	Polaris	Single circular detector.	Produced by the company's Danish subsidiary, ADAC A/S
1993	Thyrus		510(k) premarket notification, decision 21/Jun/1993 ADAC Laboratories 540 Alder Dr. Milpitas, CA 95035. Manufactured by the company's Danish subsidiary, ADAC A/S
1994	EPIC Detector	The EPIC detector was introduced in 1994 and replaces the analogue rectangular detector.	
-	Transcam	Single round detector, mobile	Manufactured by the company's Danish subsidiary, ADAC A/S
1994	Vantage	Simultaneous transmission/emission attenuation correction	ADAC plans to file for FDA 510(k) clearance for Vantage Jun 1994
-	Argus EPIC detector	Single rectangular detector.	
1995	Vertex Classic	Dual rectangular detector, 180/90° user selectable geometry, dual ring gantry design, automatic collimator exchange	
1995	Vertex Cardio EPIC	Dual rectangular detector, 90° fixed geometry, dual ring gantry design.	
1995	Vertex Solus EPIC	Dual rectangular detector, 180° fixed geometry, dual ring gantry design.	
-	Vertex PLUS	Dual rectangular detector, 180/90° user selectable geometry, dual ring gantry design.	
-	Vertex Amazon V60	Dual rectangular detector, 180/90° user selectable geometry, dual ring gantry design.	
1995	MCD Technology	Molecular Coincidence Detection (MCD) was introduced in Jun 1995	
1995	Vertex with MCD	Dual rectangular detector, 180/90° user selectable geometry, dual ring gantry design, with Molecular Coincidence Detection (MCD)	
1998	Forte Classic	Dual rectangular detector, 180/90° user selectable geometry, single ring gantry design.	The Forte gantry was a design by DDD, manufactured by ADAC Laboratories.
-	Forte Power Pack	Dual rectangular detector, 180/90° user selectable geometry, single ring gantry design.	
-	Forte with MCD	Dual rectangular detector, 180/90° user selectable geometry, single ring gantry design.	
1999	Skylight EPIC	Dual rectangular detectors, 19=80/90 user selectable geometry, overhead gantry with suspended detectors. With EPIC detectors	

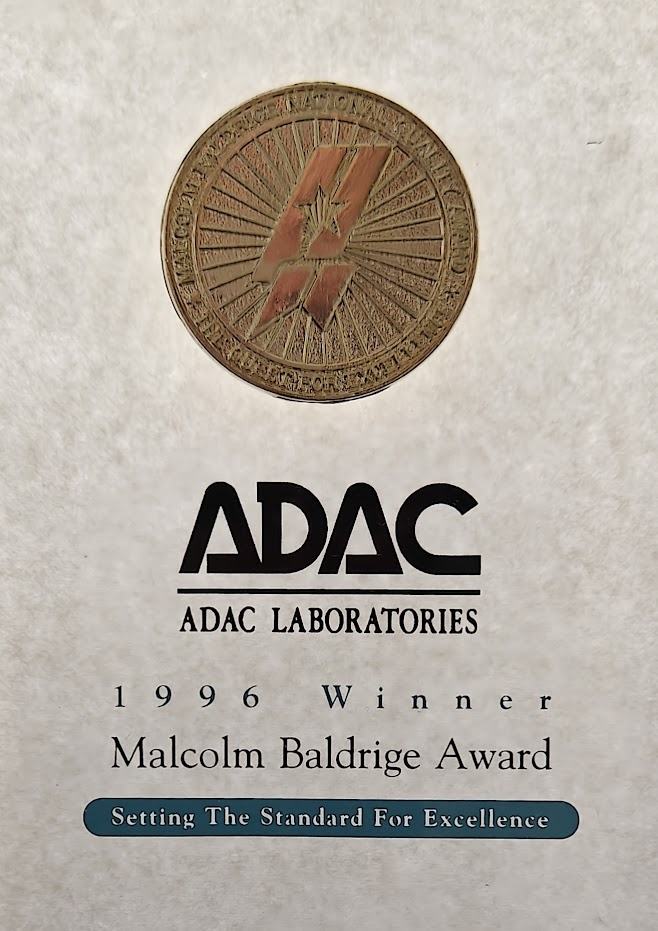
https://www.nist.gov/news-events/news/1996/10/president-clinton-announces-winners-1996-baldrige-quality-awards

==== Products post Philips acquisition but issuing FDA pre-market filings as ADAC Laboratories, 540 Alder Dr., Milpitas, CA 95035. ====
Year	Product	Description	Notes
2001	Gemini		
2001	Skylight (modification)	Option added: "to acquire a single head acquisition studies on two separate but simultaneous planar patients"	
-	Skylight (modification)	EPIC detectors replaced with AZ detectors.	Although the name ADAC Laboratories had been replaced with Philips in regards to the main brand labels on the Skylight, there were still references to ADAC on the serial number labels as late as 2008. See photo.
2005	Precedence	SPECT/CT imaging system	
2006	Apollo	Larger bore Forte with 3/4" rather the 5/8" crystals, not sold under the name Apollo.	From FDA information this product was sold under the name Philips Brightview

=== Positron Emission Tomography (PET) ===
Year	Product	Description	Notes
1993	C-PET		
-	C-PET Plus		
2001	Allegro		

=== Radiation Treatment Planning Systems ===
Year	Product	Description	Notes
1982	RTP 5000		
1985	XL-Plan 23 & XL-Plan 73		510(k) premarket notification, decision 18/Jul/1985
-	Pinnacle		
-	Pinnacle3		
-	ePinnacle		

=== Healthcare Information Systems (ADAC Laboratories, Milpitas and HCIS a subsidiary of ADAC Laboratories ) ===
Year	Product	Description	Notes
~1985-87	MARS II	Radiology Management System	For clerical and administrative functions in a diagnostic imaging department
-	Envoi		
-	QuadRIS		
-	CorCAAT	Cardiology Systems	
-	CAATi	Cardiology Systems	

ADAC Laboratories were once the US domestic market leaders and as of 2021 are still in clinical use around the world and are also used for commercial & educational use

== Corporate Affairs ==
=== Company Acquisitions ===
- 1993 SD&G Healthcare Systems, Inc., specializing in radiology information systems.
- 1995 Community Health Computing (CHC), Inc., specializing in laboratory and radiology information systems
- 1997 Cortet, Inc., a developer of integrated computer systems for use in cardiac catheterization laboratories

=== Patent Acquisitions ===
- ADAC purchases Philips' nuclear medicine patent portfolio, consisting of 13 U.S. patents and 56 foreign patents and patent applications. (1994)

=== Litigation ===
- Elscint sues ADAC for patent infringement, ADAC counter sues. (1993)

=== Corporate Officers ===
- Lowe, David L (CEO/Director)
- Eckert, R Andrew (CEO/Director)
- Starr, Robert A (Director)
- Simone Phillip A (Treasurer)
- Czerwinski, Stanley D (CEO/Director)
- King, Graham O. (Director)
- Masterson, Karen L (Corporate Secretary)

=== Related Entities with reference to 540 Alder Drive, Milpitas ===
- Adac Medical Technologies, Inc
- Adac Laboratories
- Adac Research & Manufacturing, Inc
- Adac/SD&G Healthcare Systems, Inc
- Adac Radiology Services, Inc
- Adac Healthcare Partners, Inc

=== ADAC International Subsidiaries ===
- ADAC Laboratories (Australia)
- ADAC Laboartories (Brazil)
- ADAC Laboratories (Canada)
- ADAC Laboratories (Denmark) (Jellingvej 5 9230 Svenstrup, Denmark, DK)
- ADAC Laboratories (France)
- ADAC Laboratories (Germany)
- ADAC Laboratories (Italy)
- ADAC Laboratoires (Japan)
- ADAC Laboratories (Latin America)
- ADAC Laboratories (Netherlands) (European H.Q.)
- ADAC Laboratories (Pacific)
- ADAC Laboratories (United Kingdom) Thame, Oxfordshire.
