= Krishna Saraswat =

Indian professor

- Born: July 3, 1947 (age 79)
- Education: Stanford University (Ph.D.); BITS Pilani (B.E.)
- Awards: 2000 Thomas D. Callinan Award; 2004 IEEE Andrew S. Grove Award
- Scientific career
- Fields: Electrical Engineering, nanophotonics, photonic crystals, solar cells
- Workplaces: Stanford University
- Doctoral advisor: James D. Meindl

Krishna Saraswat is a professor in Stanford Department of Electrical Engineering in the United States. He is an ISI Highly Cited Researcher in engineering, placing him in the top 250 worldwide in engineering research, and a recipient of IEEE's Andrew S. Grove Award for "seminal contributions to silicon process technology".

== Education and positions ==
Saraswat received his B.E. degree in electronics in 1968 from Birla Institute of Technology and Science, Pilani (BITS) and his M.S. (1968) and Ph.D. (1974) in electrical engineering from Stanford University. Saraswat stayed at Stanford as a researcher and was appointed professor of electrical engineering in 1983. He also has an honorary appointment of an adjunct professor at the Birla Institute of Technology and Science, Pilani, India, since January 2004 and a visiting professor during the summer of 2007 at IIT Bombay, India. He is Stanford's Rickey/Nielsen Professor in the School of Engineering, and courtesy professor of materials science and engineering.

== Career ==
Saraswat has worked on modeling of CVD of silicon, conduction in polysilicon, diffusion in silicides, contact resistance, interconnect delay, and oxidation effects in silicon. He pioneered the technologies for aluminum/titanium layered interconnects, which became an industry standard, as well as CVD of MOS gates with alternative materials such as tungsten, WSi2, and SiGe.

Saraswat worked on microwave transistors in graduate school, and his thesis was on high voltage MOS devices and circuits. During the late 1980s he focused on single wafer manufacturing and developed equipment and simulators for it. Jointly with Texas Instruments a microfactory for single wafer manufacturing was demonstrated in 1993. Since the mid 1990s, Saraswat has worked on technology for scaling MOS technology to sub-10 nm regime and pioneered several new concepts of 3-D ICs with multiple layers of heterogeneous devices. His present research focuses on new materials, particularly SiGe, germanium, and III-V compounds, to replace silicon as nanoelectronics scales further.

As of July 2019, Krishna Saraswat has been granted approximately 15 patents.

== Awards and honors ==
- 2013; 1989 - Elected Fellow of the IEEE ('89) and Life Fellow ('13)
- 2012 - Semiconductor Industry Association (SIA) University Researcher of the Year Award
- 2012 - Alum of the Year Award Birla Institute of Technology and Science, Pilani
