= Zoran Corporation =

American digital technology company

- Type: Public
- Traded as: Nasdaq: ZRAN
- Industry: Fabless semiconductor; Consumer electronics
- Founded: 1981; 45 years ago
- Founder: Yuval Almog and Dr. Levy Gerzberg
- Defunct: 31 August 2011
- Fate: Merged/acquired
- Successor: CSR
- Headquarters: Sunnyvale, California, U.S.
- Area served: Worldwide
- Key people: Dr. Uzia Galil (chairman of the board); Dr. Levy Gerzberg (president, CEO, director); Isaac Shenberg (senior VP of business development)
- Brands: Vaddis (DVD player chip), COACH (digital camera chip), SupraHD (HDTV chip)
- Revenue: ▼US$357 million (2010)
- Operating income: ▼-$40.6 million (GAAP, 2010)
- Net income: ▼-$47.6 million (GAAP, 2010); ▼-$21.5 million (Non-GAAP, 2010)
- Total assets: ▼$507 million (2010)
- Total equity: ▼$401 million (2010)
- Number of employees: 1,411 (September 2009)
- Website: qualcomm.com

Zoran Corporation was a multinational digital technology company, founded in 1981 and headquartered in Silicon Valley, that was predominantly focused on designing and selling SoC (System on a Chip) integrated circuits for consumer electronics applications. The name Zoran is derived from the Hebrew word for silicon. Zoran was incorporated in the state of Delaware and had offices in Canada, China, England, Germany, India, Israel, Japan, Korea, Taiwan, and the US. Zoran had strong ties with Israel, with a strong R&D presence and being the beneficiary of incentives from organizations such as Israel's Ministry of Industry and Trade.

After an early focus on filter and signal processors for military, industrial and medical applications, Zoran started focusing on data compression products for emerging multimedia applications and became better known in the late 1990s as a supplier of Motion JPEG codec chips used on PC add-in cards for video capture and video editing applications. After the turn of the millennium, sales increased substantially as Zoran became a leading provider of chips for DVD players, which it continued to be until about 2007, covering a period during which the production volume of DVD players increased strongly and the semiconductor value in this segment reached its peak. Starting from 2005, Zoran also supplied chips for a substantial portion of the worldwide production of digital cameras. Around 2008 and 2009, Zoran was successful as a supplier of cost-effective integrated chips for LCD TVs supporting the ATSC standards used for HDTV broadcast in the US.

In 2011, Zoran merged with UK-based CSR and is now represented by the CSR brand and stock. After the merger, CSR executed substantial layoffs of former Zoran employees.

== History ==
=== Supplier of signal processing ICs ===
Zoran was founded in 1981 by Yuval Almog and Dr. Levy Gerzberg, with a focus on DSP technology.

The James Bond film A View to a Kill was about a conspiracy to destroy Silicon Valley to corner the market on computer chips. After production wrapped, none of the film's producers had been aware of the Zoran Corporation's existence when selecting a name for the villainous Max Zorin (Christopher Walken) and his fictional organisation known as "Zorin Industries". Zoran Corporation considered this calumnious and settled with Pinewood Studios by agreeing that a disclaimer be stated prior to film's start that the name "Zorin" identified no known, living person nor was intended to be critical to the computer chip industry or any real world corporate entity.

Until 1991, Zoran derived the substantial majority of its revenues from digital filter processors and vector signal processors used principally in military, industrial and medical applications. In 1989, it repositioned its business to develop and market data compression products for emerging multimedia applications and discontinued development of digital filter processor and vector signal processor products.

=== Supplier of multimedia chips, success in DVD player market ===
Zoran became better known through PC video products incorporating Motion JPEG technology, which until 2001 were a significant contributor to Zoran's revenues. The ZR3606x and ZR3650x (with USB interface) family of devices was widely used in PC-based video capture and editing devices. Zoran also offered digital audio products such as the ZR38601, a single-chip digital audio processor designed to support the PC and home theater digital speaker market. Zoran also offered to third parties chip design IP (intellectual property) cores for decoding and encoding NTSC, PAL or SECAM television signals.

In 1997 Zoran acquired CompCore Multimedia, a provider of software-based compression products and a designer of IP cores for video and audio decoder integrated circuits.

Beginning in 1997, Zoran established itself as a leading provider of MPEG-2 technology for DVD and Super Video CD applications. Although, unlike some competitors, the company had not participated in the first major revenue opportunity for high-volume MPEG-decoding chips, the Chinese Video CD player boom of the late 1990s based on MPEG-1 decoding technology, increasing sales of chips for DVD player applications launched Zoran into a period of strong revenue growth and expansion. For several years starting from 2001, Zoran derived a substantial majority of its product revenues from the sale of DVD player chips.

=== Prominence and product diversification through acquisitions and turning point of DVD business ===
In October 2000, Zoran acquired Nogatech, Inc., a manufacturer of integrated circuits that establish connections between video devices and computers as well as connections between video devices across a variety of networks, in exchange for Zoran common stock with a fair value of $154 million.

In 2003, Zoran purchased Oak Technology in a deal valued at $358 million, thereby expanding its product portfolio with chips used in digital televisions (originally from TeraLogic which Oak had earlier acquired), as well as chips and software used in inkjet printers, laser printers, multi-function printers, and industrial imaging equipment. Zoran also acquired IP related to optical storage technology, which it intended to utilize in chips targeting DVD recorders.

DVD chip sales reached a climax in Q2 2004, after which a significant inventory correction in China greatly affected Zoran. Thereafter, revenues from DVD products declined from a substantial majority of revenues until the middle of 2004 to 8% of revenues by 2010. DVD chip revenues were affected by significant declines in average selling prices and associated commoditization of DVD player chips, resulting in lower revenues and profit margins, and market share loss due to competition from low-cost competitors.

=== Growth in non-DVD product lines ===
By 2005, its COACH product line for digital camera processors, which built on its earlier JPEG expertise, had started to become significant and would be the largest revenue contributor in Zoran's later years. The printer/imaging business acquired from Oak also consistently contributed in the region of 20% of revenues.

Targeting the mobile phone market, Zoran acquired Emblaze Semiconductor (based in Israel close to a large part of Zoran's own R&D facilities) in 2004 for $54 million in cash. The resulting mobile phone multimedia processor product line eventually achieved limited success with production for LG camera phones in 2008, but could not sustain growth and Zoran discontinued development on this product line in Q3 2009.

Zoran's revenues and net income peaked in 2007, with revenues reaching $507 million and non-GAAP net income of $71 million. In 2008, revenues declined to $439 million, with non-GAAP net income declining to $8 million.

The DTV product line for flat-panel TVs and set-top boxes became successful for Zoran for a period, being the largest revenue contributor with 35% in Q3 2008. After expectations of a significant revenue decline for the company in Q1 2009, an unexpected recovery of its DTV business in Q1 2009 allowed Zoran to maintain its revenue level with DTV reaching 40% of revenues in Q2 and Q3 2009 based on Zoran's leading position in low to mid-range LCD TVs for the U.S. market.

=== Decline in final years as independent company ===
For 2009, Zoran reported revenues of $380 million, declining from $439 million in the previous year, with a non-GAAP net loss of $13 million. TV revenues increased by 40% over the previous year on market share growth for DTV in the US, with market share reported to have reached 30%. However, by Q2 2010 the DTV business began to see challenges and the outlook for this business was significantly reduced. Around this time frame the market for DTV and digital camera chips started to suffer from increased competition and a trend towards commoditization, which had earlier affected Zoran's DVD chip business, resulting in reduced average selling prices and reduced profit margins.

Zoran's last acquisition was that of silicon RF tuner company Microtune Inc. in 2010, for a transaction price of approximately $166 million. Microtune's tuner chips targeted cable set-top box, broadband cable modem, digital TV, and automotive entertainment markets.

Zoran posted a non-GAAP net loss of $21.5 million for the year 2010, on revenues of $357 million, with a loss of $15 million for Q4 2010 alone. Despite a material revenue run-rate contributed by the Microtune acquisition (based on quarterly revenues of $24 million in Q2 2010), Zoran reported revenues of $85 million for Q1 2011, with a non-GAAP net loss of $21 million. The company reported a reduced outlook for its digital camera business for the remainder of the year due to Cisco's exit from the video camcorder business. For Q2 2011, its last quarter as an independent company, revenues declined to $83 million with a non-GAAP net loss of $18 million, although it forecast revenue growth to between $100 million and $105 million for the seasonally stronger third quarter of 2011.

=== CSR plc merger ===
On 21 February 2011, Zoran announced it was merging with CSR, a global leader in wireless connectivity (including WLAN and Bluetooth) and location chip technology such as GPS based in the UK. At the time of the merger agreement, Zoran's board of directors was agitated by hedge fund Ramius LLC, which had said in a letter to the board that it believed Zoran's shares were undervalued. Due to Zoran's decreased business outlook, the offer for Zoran was reduced to about $484 million in June from the originally agreed offer value of about $679 million (based on an all-stock transaction) under mutual agreement, although a significant cash component was introduced. The merger was completed on 31 August 2011, and Zoran now trades under the CSR banner with little mention of the original company name. Zoran described the transaction as a merger, but actually, it is a takeover according to CSR management.

After the merger, CSR executed substantial layoffs involving former Zoran employees. The discontinuation of the DTV and silicon tuner divisions was announced at the end of 2011, involving the layoff of 800 employees, which some say caused CSR's share price to jump up substantially. Other divisions were cut as well, and as of the end of 2012, only the COACH (camera-on-a-chip) and Quatro (printer/imaging) product lines still existed. In December 2013 CSR announced it would discontinue development of the COACH platform, with around 200 people being laid off. As of 30 June 2014, CSR had sold the COACH and related camera/video IPs to Qualcomm.

Finally, Qualcomm acquired CSR.

== Products ==
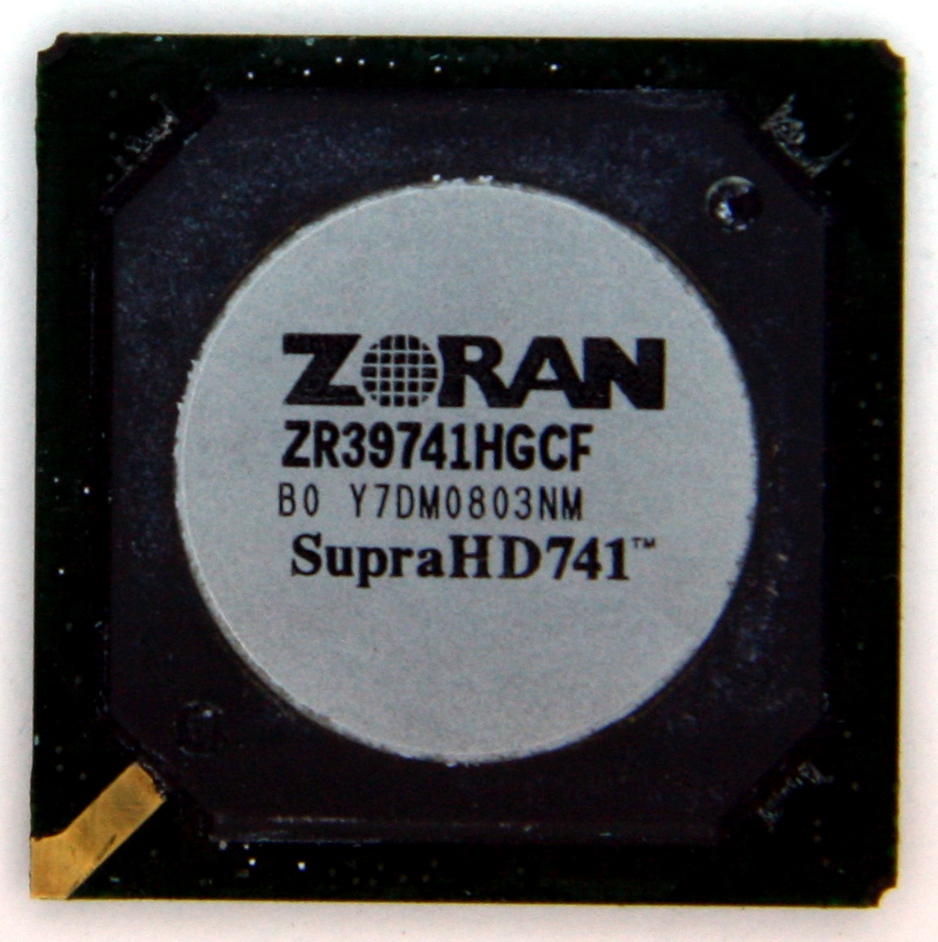
Zoran SupraHD chip

Zoran developed and marketed chips that were used in a wide range of consumer and professional electronics devices featuring image compression or video compression, including PC-based video capture and video editing devices, DVD players, DVD recorders, LCD TVs and digital CRT TVs, digital cameras, security cameras, digital TV set-top boxes, printers and related imaging devices, and mobile phones.

As is common in the semiconductor industry, Zoran was a fabless semiconductor company that outsourced the actual manufacturing of chips to independent foundries such as TSMC. Apart from semiconductor chips, Zoran also commonly provided customers with associated reference designs including a printed circuit board layout and a bill of materials with required components for common configurations, as well associated firmware and software tools, allowing a customer to bring an end product (for example, a DVD player or digital camera) to market faster with a reduced amount of investment while requiring less technical expertise.

Examples of successful chip families sold by Zoran include the Vaddis product line that was widely used in DVD players, especially in earlier brand-name models with upscaled HDMI output (using Zoran's HDXtreme upscaler chip) and by numerous low-cost manufacturers in China, the COACH image processor/video processor product line for digital cameras that saw widespread adoption among both major brands and lower cost manufacturers in Asia and shipped hundreds of millions of units, and the SupraHD product line of integrated SoC solutions for LCD TVs, primarily supporting the ATSC and NTSC standards for the U.S. market.

Other specific target applications included set-top boxes for digital TV deployment in Asia, converter boxes facilitating the transition away from analog terrestrial television in the US, DVD recorders with the Activa product line featuring MPEG-2 encoding, and high-end camera phones with APPROACH camera multimedia processors.

Prominent customers and products using Zoran chips included DVD players from brands such as Samsung, LG, Sharp and Toshiba, digital cameras sold under major brands such as Casio, Kodak, Nikon, Olympus, Pentax, Samsung and Sony, LG Viewty camera phones using APPROACH camera processors, budget LCD TVs sold in the US under brands including Insignia, Magnavox, Vizio and Westinghouse using SupraHD DTV processors, and single-function and multi-function printers (involving SoCs as well as software licenses) from brands such as Canon, Epson, HP, Lexmark, and Samsung.
