= Average selling price =

Economic term

The average selling price (ASP) of goods or commodities is the average price at which a particular product or commodity is sold across channels or markets. The term is especially used in the retail sector and technology distribution. In lodging industry, it is more commonly referred to as Average Room Rate or Average Daily Rate.
