= Elbit Imaging =

Israeli holding company

Elbit Imaging Ltd.

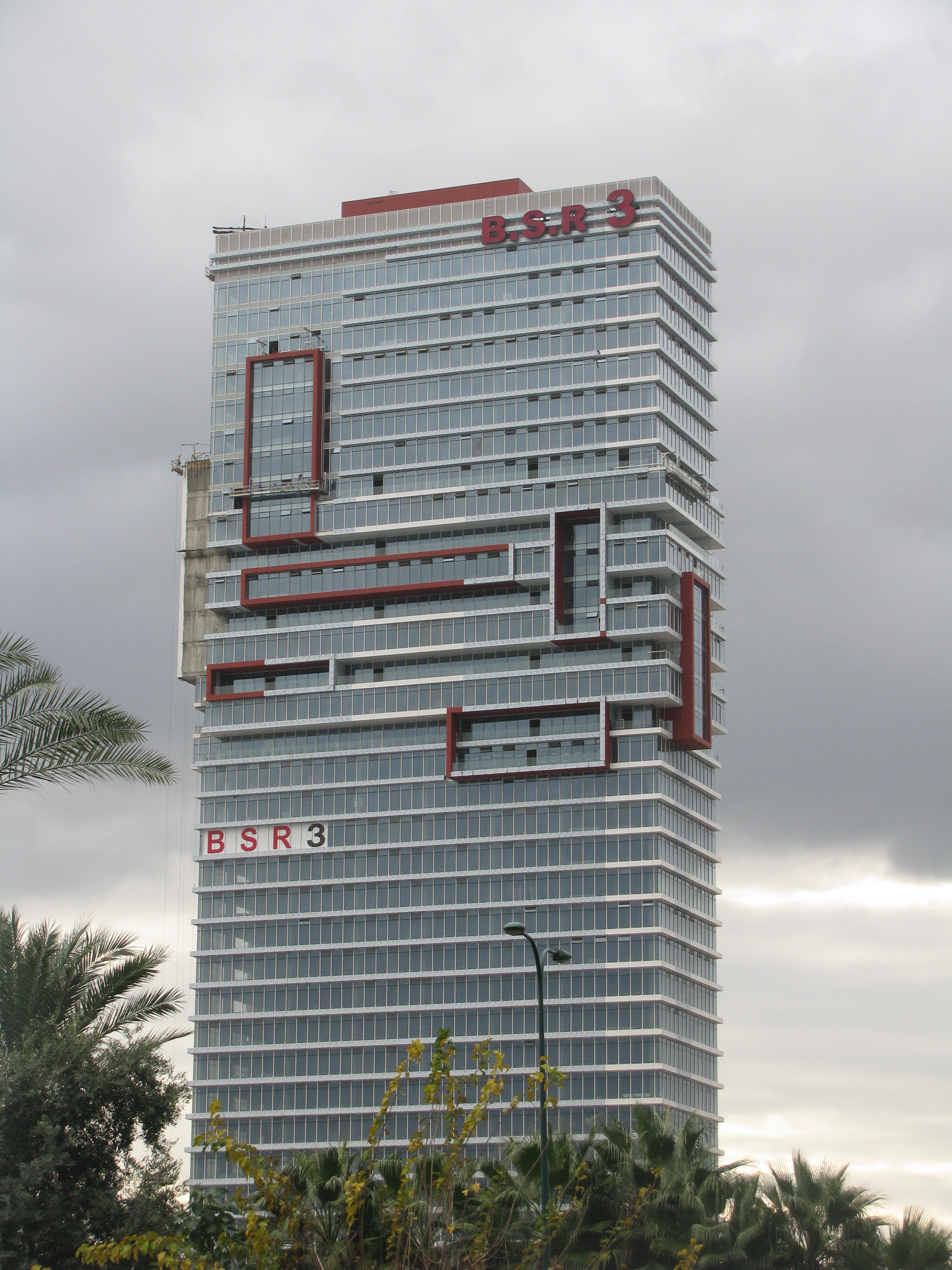
- Elbit Imaging Headquarters in Bnei Brak Israel
- Company type: Public
- Traded as: TASE: EMITF, Nasdaq: EMITF
- Industry: Medical imaging, Real Estate, Hotels; Shopping malls
- Founded: 1996; 30 years ago
- Headquarters: Tel-Aviv, Israel
- Area served: Worldwide
- Key people: Mordechai Zisser (executive president); Shimon Yitzhaki (chairman)
- Products: Magnetic resonance
- Revenue: US$ 1,049.19 million (2008)
- Number of employees: ~2,000 (2008)
- Subsidiaries: Plaza Centers N.V., Insightec, Gamida Cell Ltd., Elbit Trade and Retail Ltd.
- Website: elbitimaging.com

Elbit Imaging Ltd., formerly Elbit Medical Imaging Ltd., is an Israeli holding company with activities in real estate, medical imaging, hotels, shopping malls, and retail.

The company was founded as a spin-off from Elron Electronic Industries and Elbit, to develop and manufacture diagnostic systems and medical imaging devices; in 1999 Elbit Medical Imaging was sold to Europe-Israel Ltd., a company controlled by businessman Mordechai (Moti) Zisser, who turned it into a diversified holding company.

== History ==
The origins of Elbit Medical Imaging can be traced to 1990, when Elbit's medical arm, at the time a subsidiary of Elron, acquired a majority share in Elscint. Elscint was a company founded in 1969, which developed medical imaging equipment such as MRI and CT scanners. In 1996, Elbit was spun off into three independent companies, and Elbit Medical Imaging was created as separate NASDAQ listed company (ticker symbol:EMITF).

During 1999 and 2000 Elscint and Elbit Medical Imaging sold their imaging activities to GE Healthcare and to Picker (now Philips Medical Systems) for approximately $600 million.

In 1999. Elron Electronic Industries sold all its holdings in Elbit Medical Imaging to Europe Israel Ltd., formerly an Israeli company listed on the Tel-Aviv Stock Exchange and controlled by real estate developer Mordechai (Moti) Zisser, for a sum of approximately $127.8 million.

Following the acquisition in May 1999, Zisser integrated his existing real estate activities into the company and restructured Elbit Medical Imaging as a holding company, focusing on: real estate and hotels development, shopping and entertainment malls, industrial manufacturing and supply of components for the medical imaging; and venture capital investments in high-technology and bio-technology companies.

In 2005. Elscint, which was the first Israeli company to be listed on the then-recently established National Association of Securities Dealers Automated Quotation System (NASDAQ) in 1972, was acquired by Elbit Medical Imaging. At that time, Elscint was no longer engaged in its original medical imaging equipment activities.

On November 1, 2006, Plaza Centers N.V., an indirect subsidiary of Elbit Imaging, was listed on the London Stock Exchange. The Company raised approximately £166 million of gross proceeds and its shares are traded under the ticker "PLAZ". On October 19, 2007 Plaza Centers N.V.s shares were also listed on the Warsaw Stock Exchange under the ticker "PLZ".

In August 2007, Elbit Imaging sold its Arena Plaza Mall in Budapest, Hungary to Active Asset Investment Management (aAIM), a company chaired by Sir Alex Ferguson, for €400m. The mall was still under construction and was opened in November 2007 by Sir Alex.

In November 2007 the company's name was changed from Elbit Medical Imaging Ltd. to Elbit Imaging Ltd.

In March 2014 Elbit Imaging Ltd, Announces talks of purchasing "Gamida Cell"

== Major holdings ==
=== Shopping malls ===
- Plaza Centers N.V. - a developer of shopping and entertainment centres in the Central and Eastern Europe region.

=== Hotels ===
- The Company has 2,332 rooms in operating hotels, in the UK, Netherlands, Belgium and Romania.

=== Bio-tech and medical devices ===
- Insightec Ltd.
- Gamida Cell Ltd.

=== Mega projects ===
- Casa Radio (Dâmboviţa Center), Bucharest, Romania
- Dream Island, Budapest, Hungary

=== Hi-tech ===
- Olive Software Inc. (18.33% holding) - a leading provider of digital edition and digital archiving solutions for the publishing industry.
- Easyrun Ltd. (47.79% holding), a provider of call centers software solutions.

=== Retail ===
- Elbit Trade and Retail Ltd. - holds the Gap (clothing retailer) and Mango (clothing) franchises in Israel

== See also ==
- Elron
- Elbit
