= Insightec =

Medical device company

INSIGHTEC Ltd.
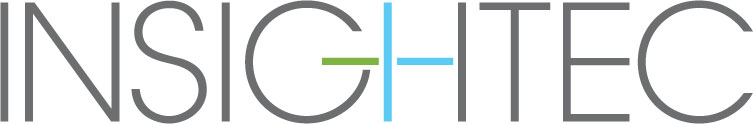
- Type: Private
- Industry: Medical devices
- Founded: 1999; 27 years ago
- Headquarters: Tirat Carmel, Israel
- Area served: Worldwide
- Products: Exablate, Exablate Neuro
- Website: Insightec.com

INSIGHTEC Ltd., is an Israeli privately held medical device company that sells MR guided Focused Ultrasound equipment. The technology can destroy deep tissue in the body without the need for incisions. Clinical use of the technology has been reported to reduce tremor symptoms in patients with essential tremor and Parkinson’s disease.

The company is headquartered in Tirat Carmel, and maintains offices in Dallas, Miami, Tokyo, and Shanghai. As of 2019, its technology had been used in more than 50 medical centres worldwide, with over 2,000 patients treated.

== History ==
The company was founded in 1999 by Kobi Vortman and Oded Tamir, with seed investment from Elbit Medical Imaging and GE Healthcare.

The company obtained premarket approval (PMA) from the Food and Drug Administration (FDA) in 2004 to market its Exablate system to treat uterine fibroids in women who did not intend to get pregnant again; and in 2015 it obtained a PMA to expand the marketing of the system to treat uterine fibroids in any woman. In 2012 the company obtained a PMA from the FDA to market the system to treat pain from metastatic bone cancer who had failed other treatments.

In 2011, the company's work was featured in TEDMED by Yoav Medan, chief systems architect.

In 2012, the company received European CE mark for the treatment of neurological disorders in the brain including essential tremor, Parkinson's disease and neuropathic pain. It won approval to market the system for uterine fibroids in China in 2013.

In 2016, Insightec obtained a PMA from the FDA to market its Exablate Neuro system to treat essential tremor, and the next month published data from the pivotal trial in the New England Journal of Medicine.

In 2016, the company hired Maurice R. Ferré, the founder and former CEO of Mako Surgical, as its CEO. Later that year, the company signed an agreement with Siemens to integrate the device with Siemens' MRI systems.

The company also received additional FDA approval in 2018 for its focused ultrasound technology.
