= Focused Ultrasound Foundation =

U.S. nonprofit organization

The Focused Ultrasound Foundation (FUSF) is a 501(c)(3) non-profit organization based in Charlottesville, Virginia, United States, that promotes the use of image-guided focused ultrasound. The foundation is primarily funded through philanthropic donations.

== History ==
The Foundation was formed on the third of January in 2005, and received charity status in November of the same year. In October 2005 the Foundation hosted the 5th International Symposium on Therapeutic Ultrasound, at Harvard Medical School, which resulted in the largest-ever gathering of world experts in the use of ultrasound for the treatment of cancer and other disorders. Under the Foundation's charter it operates as an unincorporated association.

Formerly known as Foundation for Focused Ultrasound Research and Focused Ultrasound Surgery Foundation.

In December 2019, Physics for Medicine Paris was inaugurated as a Center of Excellence, focusing on the treatment of cardiovascular diseases and neurological disorders.

In September 2020, the Children’s National Hospital became the first pediatric hospital designated as a Center of Excellence, helping patients with specific types of childhood tumors.

May 2022 marked the ten-year anniversary of Sunnybrook Health Science Centre conducting brain surgery without scalpels. In 2016, they were the only Canadian site designated by The Focused Ultrasound Foundation.

== Activities ==
The Foundation compiles and reports on web-based news related to focused ultrasound in therapeutic and diagnostic medicine, organizes and assists with symposia, discussions, and meetings pertaining to diagnostic and therapeutic focused ultrasound as well as student-related research programs. There is a strong concentration in high intensity focused ultrasound (HIFU). The Association promotes collaborations between clinical and research groups via written and oral communication.

The Focused Ultrasound Foundation offers a fellowship program to high school and university students allowing them to work with the Foundation’s medical and research teams. They often partner up with the University of Virginia and Xavier University of Louisiana to help students begin their careers.

== Funding and media ==
The FUF has received attention in part because of The Tumor, a 2015 novella by legal thriller writer John Grisham about a future glioma patient who benefits from focused ultrasound treatment. Grisham is distributing the book at no cost to raise awareness about the therapy and the Foundation. Referencing the book and Foundation, Grisham states "This is the most important book I have ever written. I have found no other cause that can potentially save so many lives."

In 2018, Virginia’s former governor, Ralph Northam visited the FUF to discuss state funding toward the technology. The Foundation received $11 million in state funding under Northam’s predecessors. Northam pledged that he would continue the support and while also investing in education hoping to draw in more scientists.

The Focused Ultrasound Foundation has been recognized by National Geographic UK for funding research regarding the ultrasound treatment technique that has the protentional to transform the treatment of life-threatening diseases and difficult-to-cure conditions.
