= Levy Gerzberg =

Israeli-American businessman (born 1945)

- לוי גרצברג
- Born: 1945 (age 80–81); Israel
- Education: Technion – Israel Institute of Technology (B.Sc., M.Sc.); Stanford University (Ph.D. in Electrical Engineering)
- Occupations: Businessman, inventor
- Known for: Co-founding Zoran Corporation
- Awards: Northern California’s “Ernst & Young Entrepreneur of the Year” (2003); California Israel Chamber of Commerce International Partnership Award (2004); Inductee, Consumer Electronics Hall of Fame (2014)

Levy Gerzberg (Hebrew: לוי גרצברג; born 1945) is an Israeli-American businessman and inventor, known for co-founding Zoran Corporation. Zoran pioneered directly and via acquisitions the design and marketing of system on a chip (SoC) technology and devices which operate many consumer electronic products. These include Digital Cameras, DVD Players, DVRs, HDTV sets, set-top boxes, Home Theaters, Printers, Digital Tuners, and more.

== Early life ==
Born in Israel, he attended the Technion, Israel's Institute of Technology, earning a bachelor’s degree in electrical engineering and a master’s degree in medical electronics. He moved to the United States in 1972 and earned a Ph.D in electrical engineering from Stanford University. He was a doctoral student of integrated circuitry pioneer James D. Meindl.

== Career ==
He began his career as an associate director of Stanford’s Electronics Laboratory. In 1981, he co-founded Zoran Corporation in Silicon Valley. Zoran is the Hebrew word for silicon. The founders conceived of integrating the digital signal processing (DSP) components of electronic system on a single silicon chip that would later be known as (SoC). The company initially created silicon chips and software for medical, industrial and military markets. Recognizing the new digital age, Gerzberg switched to designing chips and software for consumer electronics. The company’s first consumer product was a credit-card sized digital camera SoC that was used in the world’s first fully digital camera, Fujifilm’s FUJIX DS-1P. The technology was later used by many manufacturers, including Kodak, Konica, Minolta, Nikon, Pentax, Samsung, Sony, Olympus, and others. Under Gerzberg’s leadership, the company created digital camera technology, which features became mainstream, such as displaying high-resolution photos from a digital camera on an HDTV via an HDMI connection, direct printing from a camera to a printer without a personal computer, image and video stabilization, lens distortion correction, and integrating advanced camera technology on mobile devices. Gerzberg led company efforts to create SoCs including those that standardized Dolby digital audio in DVD players as well as movie and home theater systems, and more. The company was involved with digital video, audio, television, cameras, and printing as well as set-top boxes. Under Gerzberg's leadership, Zoran created the successful processor for DVD players and other gadgets with about 35% market share. Its Camera on a Chip (COACH) line of digital camera processors was also popular.

Zoran's headquarters were in Silicon Valley, CA and had development and marketing centers in the U.S., China, France, Germany, Hong Kong, Israel, Japan, Korea, Taiwan, and the United Kingdom. Gerzberg was President and CEO of Zoran from 1981 to 1985. He served as Executive Vice President and CTO from 1985 to 1987. Gerzberg was President and CEO From 1988 until 2011. The company went public in 1995, the stock traded on the NASDAQ (ZRAN). Semiconductor maker CSR on Nasdaq and on the London Stock Exchange (LSE) purchased Zoran in 2011.

Gerzberg holds 10 U.S. Patents, and Zoran’s inventions have accounted for more than 1,000 patents. He authored or co-authored more than 50 technical papers about the design of integrated circuits, device physics and fabrication, digital signal processing and related applications.

Gerzberg founded the Liora and Levy Gerzberg Family Foundation which contributes to a variety of healthcare and educational causes. He is a trustee of the Consumer Technology Association Foundation and is on the Board of the American Friends of the Rambam Medical Center. Gerzberg served two-terms on the CEA Board of Industry Leaders.

An avid open-water swimmer, Gerzberg founded the “Swim From the Heart” swim meet in Haifa, Israel that raises money to support research to treat Sudden Cardiac Death in Children. He also has swum from Alcatraz Island to San Francisco dozens of times, frequently raising money for children’s charities.

== Awards ==
In 2003, Gerzberg was named Northern California’s “Ernst & Young Entrepreneur of the Year” in the semiconductor category. In 2004, he received the California Israel Chamber of Commerce International Partnership Award. In 2007 he was elected to a seat on the Board of Industry Leaders of the Consumer Electronics Association. In 2014, he was inducted to the Consumer Electronics Hall of Fame.
