= Discount Investment Corporation =

Israeli holding company

Discount Investment Corporation Ltd.
- Type: Public
- Traded as: TASE: DISI
- Industry: Holding company (real estate, telecommunications, technology, agriculture, asset management)
- Founded: 1961; 65 years ago
- Headquarters: Tel Aviv, Israel
- Key people: Nataly Mishan-Zakai (CEO)
- Number of employees: 673
- Parent: IDB Development Ltd.
- Website: www.dic.co.il

Discount Investment Corporation Ltd. (Hebrew: דיסקאונט השקעות), or DIC, is a holding company based in Israel. The company is listed on the Tel Aviv Stock Exchange and is a constituent of the TA-125 Index. The company is controlled by IDB Development Company, which itself is held by IDB Holding Corporation Ltd. (TASE: IDBH).

DIC also holds stakes in a number of companies, including Elron Electronic Industries, Cellcom Israel, and Israir.

== History ==
Discount Investment Corporation was founded in 1961 as an investment vehicle of the Recanati family, which at the time were owners of the Israel Discount Bank, itself founded by the family in the 1930s after emigrating from Greece during the British Mandate of Palestine. The family business were controlled by umbrella company IDB Holding Corporation (IDB standing for Israel Discount Bank) founded in 1969.

In 2002 the company sold its holdings to a group of investors headed by Nochi Dankner.

In September 2012, Discount Investment Corporation and its parent company IDB Holdings had a "going concern" warning attached to their second-quarter financial reports by the group's auditors, who doubted the company can meet all its debt-repayment obligations in the foreseeable future. Bondholders of the company's debt started the process of taking control over the company.

In November 2020, control of the company passed to a group of investors headed by real estate company Mega Or Holdings, following a vote by bondholders. As of the mid-2020s, the company's main shareholders are Mega Or Holdings, controlled by Zahi Nahmias, and Elco Ltd., controlled by brothers Daniel and Michael Salkind.
