= Shibolet & Co. =

Israeli law firm

Shibolet & Co. Law Office
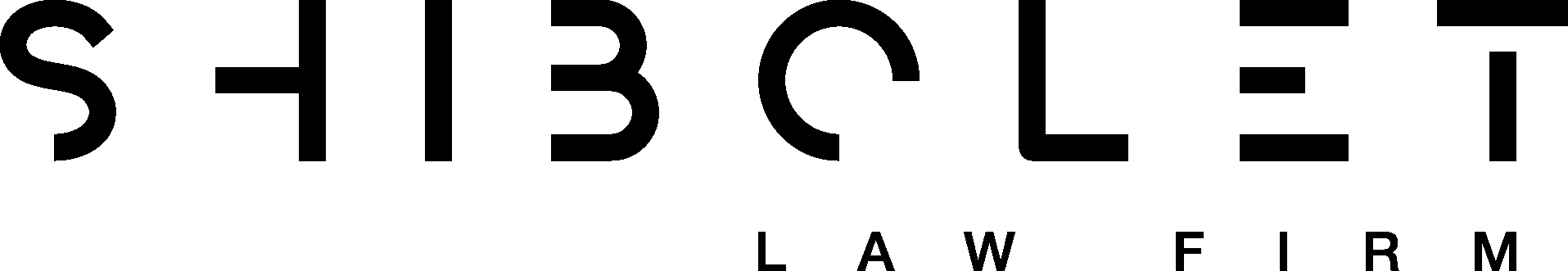
- Type: Partnership (Israel)
- Industry: Law
- Founded: Tel Aviv, Israel; 1973; 53 years ago
- Headquarters: Rubinstein Twin Towers, 4 Yitzhak Sade St., Tel Aviv, Israel
- Services: Legal advice
- Number of employees: 358 (2025)
- Website: shibolet.com

Shibolet & Co. (Hebrew: שבלת ושות') is one of the largest law firms in Israel, comprises over 280 lawyers, of whom 107 partners.

The firm is headquartered at Rubinstein Twin Towers in Tel Aviv and specializes in corporate law, providing comprehensive legal services across the full range of commercial companies’ local and international activities.

== History ==
Shibolet & Co. was founded in 1973 by Richard Roberts, Amnon Shibolet, and Yaakov Israeli. The three met while studying law at the Hebrew University of Jerusalem in the 1960s. Shortly before the Yom Kippur War outbreak, Shibolet and Roberts met with the CEO of Mizrahi Bank, Aharon Meir, and drafted a list of prospective clients on the back of his business card, which became the firm’s founding agreement.

In 1987, the first law firm merger in Israel took place, when Yaakov Israeli initiated the merger of his law firm with Shibolet & Roberts, each then comprising about 18 lawyers. In 2006, the firm merged with the practice of Moshe Neeman and Revital Ben-Artzi, growing to 70 lawyers, including 18 partners, and relocated to the Museum Tower in Tel Aviv. That year, it represented Israel's largest privatization at that time, the privatization of Ashdod Oil Refineries at a price of NIS 3.5 billion. In 2007, the firm rebranded from Shibolet, Israeli, Roberts, Zisman & Co. & Moshe C. Neeman, Ben-Artzi & Co. to the shorter name - Shibolet & Co., emphasizing the collective identity of the partnership rather than individuals. The name was chosen by lottery among the founders.

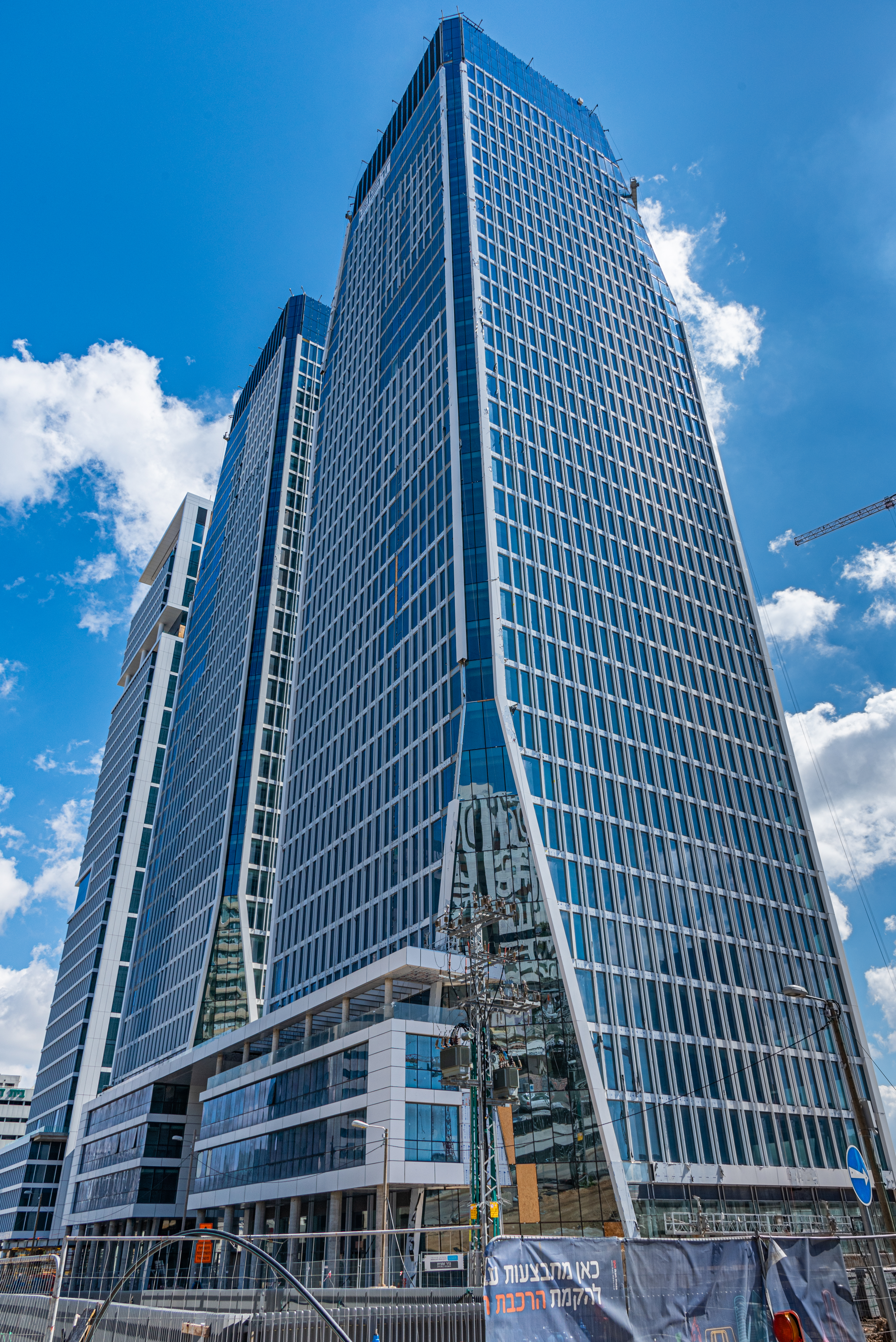
Rubinstein Twins Towers, where Shibolet offices are located.

Over the years, Shibolet & Co. has undergone significant growth and transformation through multiple mergers, including with Zeligman & Co. (2009), Israeli–Ben-Zvi (2014), and Rabin, Magriso, Benkel (2018).

These developments expanded the firm to over 210 lawyers and broadened its area of practice, including regulation and medical technology, privacy and data protection, customs law, import and export, international trade and maritime insurance, tenders, gaming, U.S. taxation, family law and wealth management, and inheritance planning for wills and trusts.

Alongside professional growth, Shibolet launched initiatives such as Israel’s first workplace sustainability guide (2008) and the “Time Out” program (2022) promoting work-life balance. The firm also took public positions on national issues, including opposing the 2023 judicial overhaul, providing legal aid following the October 7 attacks, and played a significant role together with other major Israeli law firms in establishing a global network of lawyers called “STAND WITH HUMANITY,” whose purpose was to provide information and legal defense against allegations of human rights violations and breaches of the laws of war.

In 2025 Ofer Ben-Yehuda was appointment as the firm's managing partner.

== Community Involvement ==
Shibolet allocates a portion of its lawyers’ billable hours to pro bono work. Among the organizations supported are Beit HaGalgalim, Israeli Spirit, Shavot, Ramat Hadassah Youth village, Keren Shemesh, Ra'anana Symphonette Orchestra, and the “Other Lesson” project.

Following the 2023 Israel–Hamas war, the firm made contributions to AMCHA (supporting trauma prevention among soldiers and reservists) and Ayalim (helping repopulate Israel’s southern communities).

== Recognition ==
Since 2018, Shibolet has consistently ranked among Israel’s top 5 leading law firms.

Since 2004, the firm has been recognized by Chambers and Partners in multiple practice areas, with 11 leading lawyers ranked individually. It is also ranked in 19 practice areas by The Legal 500, with 27 individual lawyers receiving distinctions, and in 8 categories by IFLR1000, with 9 lawyers highlighted.
