= Elscint =

Israeli technology company

Elscint Ltd.
- Type: Public
- Industry: Medical imaging
- Founded: 1969; 57 years ago
- Founder: Avraham Suhami
- Defunct: 2005
- Fate: sold
- Headquarters: Haifa, Israel
- Products: Computerized tomography, Magnetic resonance imaging, Ultrasound, X-ray scanners
- Revenue: US$ 311,000,000 (1996)
- Net income: US$ 8,100,000 (1996)
- Number of employees: 2000 (1996)
- Parent: Elron

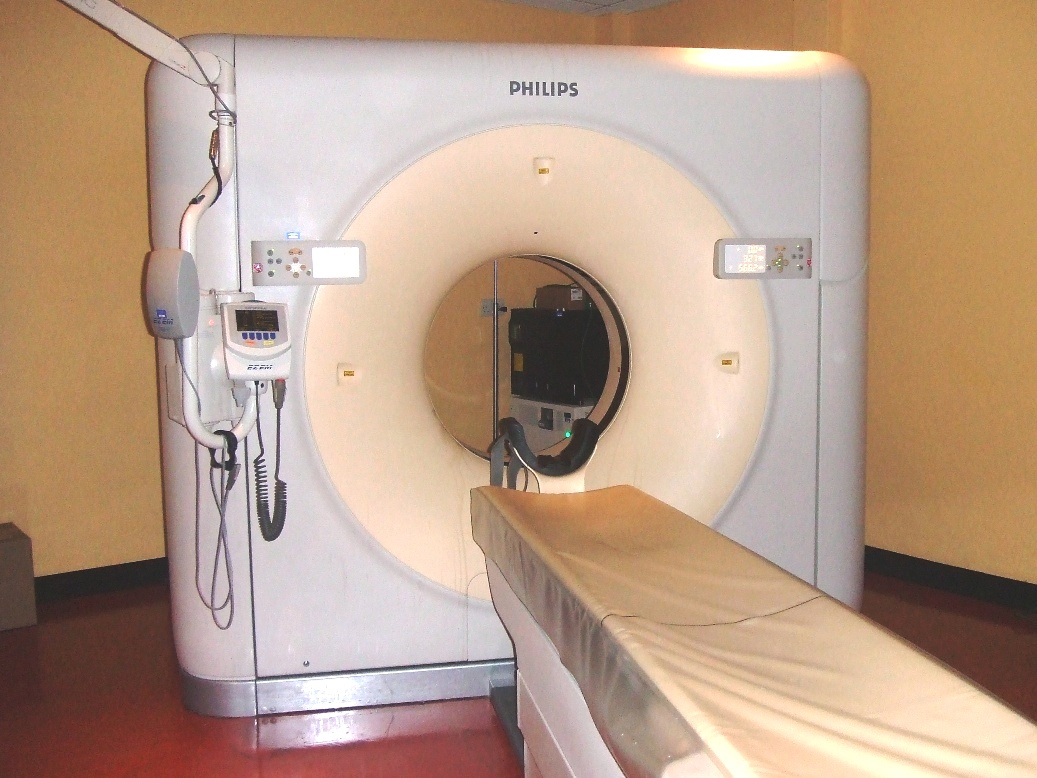
64-slice CT scanner originally developed by Elscint, now a Philips product

Elscint was an Israeli technology company that developed, manufactured and sold medical imaging solutions, including: nuclear medicine, computed tomography magnetic resonance imaging and X-ray scanners. Elscint's shares traded on the NASDAQ as well as on the Tel Aviv Stock Exchange. At its height, Elscint was a world leader in the development of medical imaging technologies. Most of Elscint's activities were sold to GE Healthcare and Philips Medical Systems.

== History ==
=== 1969–1974: Early years ===
Elscint (perhaps a portmanteau of the words "electronic" and "scientific, but more likely of "El" as in "El Al", and "Scint", as in scintillation, referring to the type of radiation detector used in Nuclear Medicine as in Elscint's first products.) was founded in 1969 by Dr. Avraham Suhami, who was a nuclear physics professor at the Technion – Israel Institute of Technology at the time, after receiving encouragement to apply his scientific and technical knowledge for commercial applications from Uzia Galil, founder of Elron, a technology investment company. Elscint was founded as a subsidiary of Elron with an initial investment of 250.000 US dollars, Suhami was appointed as the company's CEO and Dan Tolkovsky (who was the CEO of Discount Investment Corporation parent of Elron at the time) was appointed as Chairman.

The first product developed by the company was a nuclear measurement device for laboratory testing, but since the entire global market for the device was a few hundred units, which sold for $ 800 only, it was decided to refocus on the field of medical imaging. Elscint's first product in this field was a nuclear camera designed to detect cancer, but it failed commercially. Later, the company developed the VDP1, a gamma scanner used to monitor radioactive isotopes in the body. The product, sold at a price of $ 25,000 and was the first in the world with digital imaging capability.

This VDP1 was the Elscint's first commercial success, and helped the company to reach sales of a million dollars, with a loss of $ 25,000 at the end of first year of operation. The VDP1 product was displayed in trade show in Los Angeles and drew the attention of General Electric, the world leader in medical imaging; and in 1971, Elscint and General Electric signed an exclusive distribution agreement in North America. General Electric insisted that the product met its quality standards, forcing the young company to expand its technical capabilities and its manufacturing capabilities quickly. In 1972, in order to bring the company's products to world markets outside North America, Elscint opened its first international sales and marketing subsidiary in Belgium.

==== IPO on NASDAQ ====
In 1971, Fred Adler, an East Coast venture capitalist, invested in Elscint and 1972 helped the company undertake an initial public offering on the National Association of Securities Dealers Automated Quotation System (NASDAQ), making Elscint the first Israeli company to list on the then-recently established stock exchange.

=== 1975–1989: Expansion ===
By 1975, sales of gamma scanners and other products generated $12 million in revenue, and a profit of $ 400,000 for Elscint, and Avraham Suhami decided to enter a new market - computerized tomography, at the time a new emerging medical imaging technology. The company spent 2 years developing a computerized tomography scanner, which it started selling in 1977.

The company's sales began a steady growth, from $21 million in 1979 to $42 million in 1981. That year, Elscint, which by that time had provided more than 100 CT scanners to hospitals and research institutes around the world, acquired Pfizer's CT scanner business. Elscint's market share grow to 10 percent by the middle of the 1980s.

In the first half of the eighties Elscint acquired several other companies and also expanded its product offering to nuclear cameras, ultrasound, digital and conventional X-ray equipment, thus providing products for all medical imaging technologies. In addition, the company began developing its own equipment for the latest breakthrough in medical imaging at the time, magnetic resonance imaging systems. By 1983 the company had sales of $132 million and a net profit of $12.6 million. The company had more than 3,000 employees in factories, research and development facilities in Boston, England, Paris, Milan, Jerusalem, Haifa and Chicago.

=== Breakup ===
In 1990 Elbit Computers Ltd, a sister company of Elscint, and a subsidiary of Elron, acquired a majority share in Elscint. In 1996, Elbit Computers was spun off into three independent companies, one of them Elbit Medical Imaging became the holding company of Elscint. During 1999 and 2000, Elscint and Elbit Medical Imaging sold their imaging activities to GE Healthcare and to Philips Medical Systems for approximately $600 million.

In 1992, Elscint introduced Elscint CT Twin, the world's first multi-slice (actually it was double-slice) CT scanner. This system could acquire two images with every rotation of the gantry, this was something no other scanner in the world at the time could do. After the Twin the company wished to create a 4 slice system, but this would require a totally new gantry design. In an effort to save time the company decided to sell the multi-slice detector design to Siemens in exchange for their gantry and table. This allowed Siemens to enter into the multi-slice CT game and Elscint shorter to market time for the system that was to be known as the VolumeX. The VolumeX was never produced. By the time it was ready the company was sold to Picker and GE.

By 1996, Elscint's revenues reached $311 million. In 1999, Elron Electronic Industries sold all its holdings in Elbit Medical Imaging to Europe Israel Ltd., formerly an Israeli company listed on the Tel-Aviv Stock Exchange and controlled by real estate developer Mordechay (Moti) Zisser, for a sum of approximately $127.8 million.

Following the acquisition in May 1999, Zisser integrated his existing real estate activities into the company and restructured Elbit Medical Imaging as a holding company, focusing on: real estate, hotels development, shopping and entertainment malls.

In 2005, Elscint was delisted and became a wholly owned subsidiary of Elbit Medical Imaging. By that time, Elscint was no longer engaged in its original medical imaging equipment activities.

== See also ==
- Elbit Medical Imaging
- Elron
- Silicon Wadi
