= Focused ultrasound =

Non-invasive therapeutic technique

High-intensity focused ultrasound
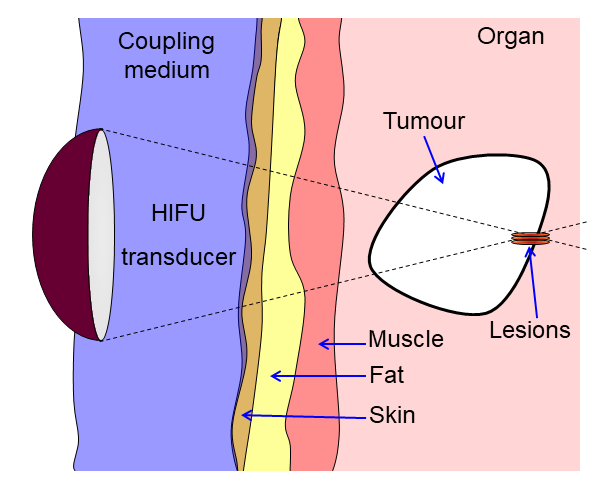
- Diagram showing how HIFU can be used to destroy tissue in the body. An acoustic lens is used to focus sound to a small point in the body. The sound propagates through many layers of tissue. Because of the focal gain, only tissue at the focus is destroyed.
- Other names: Magnetic-resonance-guided focused ultrasound surgery (MRgFUS), focused ultrasound surgery (FUS), MR-guided focused ultrasound ablation

High-intensity focused ultrasound (HIFU), or MR-guided focused ultrasound surgery (MR-guided focused ultrasound ablation), is an incisionless therapeutic technique that uses non-ionizing ultrasonic waves to heat or ablate tissue. HIFU can be used to increase the flow of blood or lymph or to destroy tissue, such as tumors, via thermal and mechanical mechanisms. Given the prevalence and relatively low cost of ultrasound generation mechanisms, HIFU is expected to be a non-invasive and low-cost therapy that can outperform surgical care.

The technology is different from that used in ultrasonic imaging, though lower frequencies and continuous, rather than pulsed, waves are used to achieve the necessary thermal doses. However, pulsed waves may also be used if mechanical rather than thermal damage is desired. Acoustic lenses are often used to achieve the necessary intensity at the target tissue without damaging the surrounding tissue. The ideal pattern diagram is the beam-focusing of a magnifying glass of sunlight; only the focal point of the magnifying glass has high temperature.

HIFU is combined with other imaging techniques such as medical ultrasound or MRI to guide treatment and monitoring.

== History ==
In March 1992 General Electric filed U.S. patent 5,247,935 on a system and method combining MRI temperature Imaging with high intensity focused ultrasound.

Studies on localized prostate cancer in 2007 showed that, after treatment, progression-free survival rates were high for low- and intermediate- risk patients with recurrent prostate cancer.

In 2009, the Insightec ExAblate 2000 was the first MRgFUS system to obtain FDA market approval,

In 2016, the US Food and Drug Administration (FDA) approved Insightec's Exablate system to treat essential tremor. Treatment for other thalamocortical dysrhythmias and psychiatric conditions are under investigation.

In 2023, Edison histotripsy developer HistoSonics was approved by the FDA to use the technique to destroy tumors and tissue under real-time image guidance. In 2025 the company closed a $250M investment round.

== Medical uses ==
There is no accepted boundary between HIFU and other forms of therapeutic ultrasound. In some literature, HIFU refers to the high levels of energy required to destroy tissue through ablation or cavitation, although it is also sometimes used to describe lower intensity applications such as occupational and physical therapy.

Either way, HIFU is used to non-invasively heat or ablate tissue deep in the body without an incision. The main applications are the destruction of tissue caused by hyperthermia, increasing perfusion and physical therapy. It later found use to treat tumors of the liver, with clinical trials underway for other sites, as well as musculoskeletal conditions.

=== Neurological disorders ===
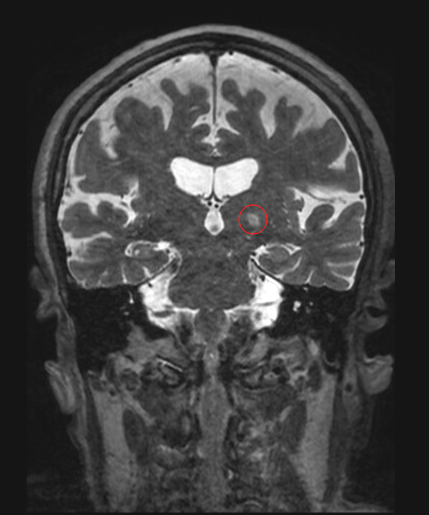
Frontal MRI four days after MRgFUS (MRI-guided high-intensity focused ultrasound): Left ventral intermediate nucleus (Vim) thalamotomy. 79-year-old man with essential tremor.

One of the first applications of HIFU was for Parkinson's disease in the 1940s. Although ineffective at the time, HIFU has the capacity to lesion pathology. Focused ultrasound is approved in Israel, Canada, Italy, Korea and Russia to treat essential tremor, neuropathic pain, and Parkinsonian tremor. This approach enables treatment of the brain without an incision or radiation.

=== Cancers ===
HIFU applied to cancers can disrupt the tumor microenvironment and trigger an immune response, as well as possibly enhance the efficacy of immunotherapy.

==== Prostate ====
HIFU may be effective for treating prostate cancer.

==== Liver ====
HIFU has been studied in liver cancer and many studies report a high response rate and positive outcome. During the treatment of metastasized liver cancer with HIFU, immune responses have been observed in locations distant from the focal region. A 2024 clinical trial of histotripsy on liver tumors, researchers reported a 95% success rate. Clinical trials are underway for treating tumors of the pancreas and kidney.

=== Histotripsy ===
Histotripsy is a form of non-thermal HIFU for use on the liver that shows some therapeutic potential. Histotripsy mechanically destroys tissue through cavitation.

=== Kidney stones ===
Focused ultrasound may be used to dissolve kidney stones by lithotripsy.

=== Cataracts ===
Ultrasound may be used to treat cataracts by phacoemulsification.

== Mechanism ==
Multiple HIFU beams are precisely focused on a small region of diseased tissue to locally deposit high levels of energy. Focused ultrasound can generate localized heating. Focusing can be guided by Magnetic Resonance Imaging (MRgFUS). These procedures generally use lower frequencies than diagnostic ultrasound (0.7 to 2 MHz), but the higher frequency means lower focusing energy.

=== Temperature ===
The temperature of tissue at the focus can be increased to between 65 and 85 °C. This induces coagulative necrosis, destroying the tissue. Tissue heated above 60 °C for longer than 1 second becomes irreversibly damaged. Each sonication (individual ultrasound energy deposition) treats a precisely defined portion of tissue. Multiple sonications cover a larger area, creating a volume of incompressible material, such as tap water.

$\mathit{CEM} = \int_{t_o}^{t_f} R^{T_{\mathrm{reference}}-T} dt$

with the integral over the treatment time, R=0.5 for temperatures over 43 °C and 0.25 for temperatures between 43 °C and 37 °C, a reference temperature of 43 °C, and time T is in minutes. The equations and methods represent an approach for thermal dose estimation in an incompressible material such as tap water.

An ultrasound acoustic wave cannot propagate through compressible tissue, such as rubber or human tissues. In that case the ultrasound energy is converted to heat. Using focused beams, a small region of heating can be achieved deep in tissues (usually on the order of 2~3 mm). Tissue changes as a function of the subtle shaking from the heated water within and the duration of this heating according to the thermal dose metric. Focusing at more than one place or by scanning, a volume can be ablated. Thermal doses of 120-240 min at 43 °C coagulate cellular protein and lead to irreversible tissue destruction.

=== Cavitation ===
==== Inertial ====
At high enough acoustic intensities, cavitation (microbubbles forming and interacting with the ultrasound field) can occur. Microbubbles produced in the field oscillate and grow (due to factors including rectified diffusion), and can eventually implode (inertial or transient cavitation). During inertial cavitation, temperatures increase inside the bubbles. The ultimate collapse during the rarefaction phase is associated with a shock wave and jets that can mechanically damage tissue.

==== Stable ====
Stable cavitation creates microstreaming, which induces high shear forces on cells and leads to apoptosis. Bubbles produced by the vaporization of water due to acoustic forces oscillate under a low-pressure acoustic field. Strong streaming may cause cell damage, but also reduces tissue temperature via convective heat loss.

=== Theory ===
Ultrasound can be focused in several ways—via a lens (for example, a polystyrene lens, parabola curve transducer, or a phased array). This can be calculated using an exponential model of ultrasound attenuation. The ultrasound intensity profile is bounded by an exponentially decreasing function where the decrease in ultrasound is a function of distance traveled through tissue:

$I=I_o {e}^{-2\alpha \mathrm{z}}$

$I_o$ is the initial intensity of the beam, $\alpha$ is the attenuation coefficient (in units of inverse length), and z is the distance traveled through the attenuating medium (e.g. tissue).

In this ideal model, $\frac{-\partial I}{\partial \mathrm{z}} = 2\alpha I= Q$ is a measure of the power density of the heat absorbed from the ultrasound field. This demonstrates that tissue heating is proportional to intensity, and that intensity is inversely proportional to the area over which an ultrasound beam is spread. Therefore, narrowly focusing the beam or increasing the beam intensity creates a rapid temperature rise at the focus.

The ultrasound beam can be focused in several ways:

- Geometrically, with a lens or with a spherically curved transducer.
- Electronically, by adjusting the relative phases of elements in an array of transducers (a "phased array"). This steers the beam to different locations. Aberrations in the ultrasound beam due to tissue structures can be corrected. This assumes no reflection, no absorption and no diffusion in intermediate tissue. The ultrasound itself can penetrate incompressible materials such as water, but compressible materials such as air, rubber, human tissue, fat, fiber, hollow bone, and fascia reflect, absorb, and diffuse the energy.

== Beam delivery ==
Beam delivery consists of beam steering and image guidance. The beam has the ability to pass through overlying tissues without harm and focus on a localized area of 2–3 mm (at most), that determines the frequency of the ultrasound. Following ablation a distinct boundary (less than 50 microns wide) forms between healthy and necrotic tissue.

=== Beam steering ===
The most common transducer is a concave focusing transducer with a fixed aperture and a fixed focal length. Phased array transducers can be used with different arrangements (flat/bowl).

=== Beam guidance ===
HIFU therapy requires careful monitoring and so it is usually performed in conjunction with other imaging techniques.

Pre-operative imaging, for instance CT and MRI, are used to identify general parameters of the target anatomy. Real-time imaging provides safe and accurate noninvasive targeting and monitoring. Both MRI and medical ultrasound have been used. These techniques are known respectively as Magnetic Resonance guided Focused Ultrasound Surgery (MRgFUS) and Ultrasound guided Focused Ultrasound Surgery (USgFUS) respectively.

MRgFUS is a 3D imaging technique. It features high soft tissue contrast and provides information about temperature, thus allowing ablation to be monitored. However, low frame rates make this technique perform poorly in real-time imaging while high costs limit its use.

USgFUS is a 2D imaging technique. While no quantitative temperature measurement system is available, benefits such as high frame rate (up to 1000 images per second), low cost and minimal adverse health effects commend it. Ultrasound verifies the acoustic window in real time using the same modality as the therapy. This implies that if the target region is not visualized by ultrasound imaging before and during therapy, then it is unlikely that the therapy will be effective in that specific region. In addition, treatment outcomes can be estimated in real time through visual inspection of hyperechoic changes in standard B-mode images.
