= List of fellows of IEEE Electron Devices Society =

The Fellow grade of membership is the highest level of membership, and cannot be applied for directly by the member – instead the candidate must be nominated by others. This grade of membership is conferred by the IEEE Board of Directors in recognition of a high level of demonstrated extraordinary accomplishment.

Year	Fellow	Citation
1968	James Meindl	For leadership and contributions in the field of microelectronic and integrated circuitry
1968	James Biard	For outstand contributions in the field of optoelectronics
1970	Herbert Kroemer	For the invention of the drift transistor and other semiconductor devices
1971	Richard Anderson	For contributions to semiconductors and to engineering education
1972	George Haddad	For contributions to solid-state and quantum electronic devices and engineering education
1972	Martin Lepselter	For contributions to the advancement of transistor and integrated circuit arts
1974	Marvin White	For contributions to the theory and development of solid-state electronic devices, especially memory transistors and charge-coupled imaging arrays
1975	Lewis Terman	For contributions to the design and development of semiconductor computer memory and logic circuitry
1977	J Zemel	For contributions to solid-state electronics and the development of IV- VI compound semiconductors for infrared photoconductive applications
1978	David Barbe	For contributions to the theory, understanding, and development of charge-coupled devices.
1978	John Osepchuk	For contributions to microwave technology and to microwave safety.
1979	James Goell	For technical contributions and leadership in the fields of optical fibers, integrated optical circuits, and millimeter waveguides
1979	Alfred U. MacRae	For leadership in the development of ion implantation technology and its application to semiconductor device fabrication
1981	A Ballato	For contributions to the theory of piezoelectric crystals and frequency control.
1981	Robert G. Meyer	For contributions to analysis and design of high-frequency amplifiers
1982	Fred Blum	For leadership in and contributions to the development of high-speed electronic and optoelectronic devices using III-V compounds
1982	William Holton	For technical leadership in semiconductor research and development
1982	Simon Middelhoek	For contributions to the theory of magnetic thin films and to magnetic and semiconductor technologies and for leadership in engineering education
1982	Bruce Wooley	For contributions to the design of integrated circuits for communications systems
1983	B. Jayant Baliga	For contributions to the development of power semiconductor devices
1983	C Berglund	For contributions to metal–oxide–semiconductor interface physics and devices
1983	Richard Eden	For contributions to the development of high speed gallium arsenide integrated circuits and III-V alloy photodetectors.
1983	Jerry G. Fossum	For contributions to the theory and technology of silicon solar cells and transistors
1983	H Troy Nagle	For contributions to industrial electronics, data acquisition, and control instrumentation.
1983	Takuo Sugano	For contributions to semiconductor technology and devices and to engineering education.
1984	H Casey	For contributions to III-V compounds in understanding emission based on the basic optical and impurity behavior
1984	Robert W. Dutton	For contributions to computer-aided modeling of silicon devices and fabrication processes
1984	Cyril Hilsum	For pioneering theoretical predictions of negative resistance effects due to photoelectrons in gallium arsenide
1985	Michael Adler	For contributions to CAD modeling of power semiconductor devices
1985	Arthur Foyt	For contributions to ion implantation techniques for semiconductor device fabrication.
1985	Rajinder Khosla	For contributions to solid-state imaging, and for leadership in microelectronics
1985	James McGarrity	For contributions to the understanding of the physical mechanisms producing radiation damage in MOS devices
1985	Jim Plummer	For contributions to understanding silicon fabrication processes, device physics, and high-voltage integrated circuits
1986	David K. Ferry	For contributions to the study of carrier transport in semiconductors and the physics of submicron semiconductor devices.
1986	Kenneth Galloway	For contributions to the study of radiation effects in microelectronics
1986	Richard Jaeger	For contributions to devices technology for high-performance analog and digital computer systems.
1986	Michael Tompsett	For innovation and leadership in the application of charge-coupled devices for imaging, memory, and signal processing
1986	Kensall Wise	For leadership in the field of integrated solid-state sensors and engineering education
1986	H Yu	For leadership and contributions to advanced technology for VLSI circuits
1987	P Daniel Dapkus	For development of the metalorganic chemical vapor deposition process for the growth of III-V compound semiconductor heterostructures
1987	John Hauser	For contributions to the understanding of carrier transport in semiconductors and to the development of cascade solar cells.
1987	Tak Ning	For contributions to understanding hot-electron effects on MOSFET devices, and advances in bipolar technology
1987	Ca Salama	For contributions to the development of power semiconductor devices and the design of integrated circuits
1988	Richard S. Muller	For contributions to solid-state sensors and to the education in solid-state electronics
1988	Robert Bierig	For leadership in the research of GaAs device and MMIC technology
1988	James S. Harris	For contributions to compound semiconductor materials and devices
1988	Lawrence Kazmerski	For contributions to photovoltaic device technology and to electronic materials and device characterization
1989	Louis Parrillo	For contributions to CMOS and bipolar integrated circuits
1989	Michael Shur	For contributions to the development of high-speed devices and integrated circuits
1989	Pallab Bhattacharya	For contributions to the synthesis and characterization of III-V compounds and heterostructures and their application to electronic and optical devices
1989	Raymond Boxman	For advances in vacuum arc theory and its applications
1989	Madhu Gupta	For contributions to the characterization and modeling of noise in high-frequency semiconductor devices and microwave integrated circuits
1989	Robert Hartman	For contributions to the reliability of semiconductor lasers for optical-fiber communication systems
1989	John Kassakian	For contributions to education and research in power electronics
1989	Krishna Pande	For contributions to III-V semiconductor materials and device technology, particularly for advancing the indium-phosphide, metal-insulator-semiconductor field-effect-transistor technology
1989	Krishna Saraswat	For contributions to metallization and interconnects for VLSI.
1989	Rudy Van De Plassche	For contributions to the design of analog integrated circuits
1989	E Vittoz	For contributions to the development of micropower integrated circuits.
1990	Harold Fetterman	For contributions in extending optical technologies into submillimeter and millimeter wave regions
1990	H Jory	For technical leadership in the development of gyrotrons
1990	John Owens	For contributions to the understanding and application of magnetostatic waves in the microwave frequency bands
1990	Dimitri Antoniadis	For contributions to the fabrication process modeling and simulation and to field-effect quantum transport devices
1990	Shojiro Asai	For contributions to advancing semiconductor device technology.
1990	C Bajorek	For leadership in the development and manufacture of magnetic data storage and high-speed computer switching devices
1990	Joe Campbell	For contributions to semiconductor photo detectors for lightwave communication.
1990	J Donnelly	For development of icon implantation techniques and their application to semiconductor photonic devices
1990	Richard Fair	For contributions to the understanding of dopant diffusion in silicon, computer modeling of silicon processes, and developments in electron devices
1990	Randy Geiger	For contributions to discrete and integrated analog circuit design
1990	Sung Mo Kang	For technical contributions to and leadership in the development of computer-aided design of very-large-scale integrated (VLSI) circuits and systems
1990	David Myers	For pioneering the development of ion beam modification of strained-layer superlattice and quantum-well compound-semiconductor materials for novel electronic and optoelectronic devices
1990	William Seidler	For contributions to research in electromagnetic pulse effects
1990	Gerald Stringfellow	For development and understanding of the organometallic vapor phase epitaxy process for III-V semiconductor devices
1990	Denny Tang	For contributions to the design and scaling of high-speed silicon bipolar devices
1991	John Bean	For contributions to silicon molecular-beam epitaxy
1991	Nathan Bluzer	For contributions to infrared image sensors and heterojunction diode detectors
1991	Gerald Borsuk	For technical leadership in solid-state and vacuum electronic devices and for contributions to the development of microelectronic photo detectors for optical signal processing
1991	Gailon Brehm	For contributions to microwave circuit design and semiconductor processing of GaAs monolithic microwave integrated circuits
1991	E Cohen	For leadership in the advancement of microwave and millimeter-wave monolithic integrated circuits
1991	Peter Cottrell	For the development of finite-element simulations for MOS and bipolar transistors and for the measurement and modeling of hot-electron effects in MOS devices
1991	Philip Hower	For contributions to the understanding and development of power semiconductor devices
1991	Renuka Jindal	For contributions to the field of solid-state devices noise theory and practice
1991	Theodore Kamins	For contributions to materials, process, design, and education in semiconductor electronics
1991	Mark Kushner	For contributions to the fundamental understanding of low-temperature plasmas
1991	Robert Leheny	For contributions to the integrated of optical and electronic devices exploiting the advantages of InP materials for telecommunications applications
1991	Nicky Lu	For contributions to semiconductor memory design and technology
1991	Ajeet Rohatgi	For theoretical and experimental contributions to the design and fabrication of high-efficiency solar cells
1991	George Sai-halasz	For contributions to device miniaturization and novel device concepts
1991	Andrzej Strojwas	For contributions to statistically based computer-aided manufacturing of integrated circuits
1991	Orlin Trapp	For contributions in industrial training in the fields of semiconductor reliability and failure analysis
1992	Bryan Ackland	For contributions to the design of custom integrated circuits for signal processing systems
1992	James J. Coleman	For contributions to semiconductor lasers through innovative epitaxial growth techniques and device designs
1992	Sergio Cova	For contributions to the instrumentation of nuclear electronics, in particular, the conception and demonstration of silicon single-photon detectors
1992	Milton Feng	For contributions to the development of implanted GaAs and InGaAs millimeter-wave MESFET transistors
1992	Chihiro Hamaguchi	For contributions to the understanding of hot-electron effects in semiconductors and the development of modulation spectroscopy
1992	Amr Mohsen	
1992	Hisashi Shichijo	For contributions to semiconductor memory technology
1992	Michael Stroscio	For contributions to the understanding of quantum and relativistic phenomena in solid-state and laser-produced plasma
1992	Eli Yablonovitch	For contributions to semiconductor optical device physics.
1993	David Blackburn	For contributions to the understanding and characterization of the electrothermal properties and related failure mechanisms of power semiconductor devices
1993	James Cooper	For time-of-flight studies of high-field transport at the silicon/silicon dioxide interface and demonstration of long-term charge storage in wide-band gap semiconductors
1993	Gilbert Declerck	For leadership and contributions to MOS device physics, CCD technology, and VLSI processing techniques
1993	Wilbur Johnston	For contributions to optoelectronic materials and device technology
1993	Dimitrios Pavlidis	For contributions to the design and technology of heterojunction transistors and monolithic microwave integrated circuits
1993	Siegfried Selberherr	For pioneering work in numerical analysis of semiconductor devices and their fabrication processes
1993	Stephen Senturia	For contributions to the application of microfabrication technology to microsensors and microacoustors, and to the characterization of microelectronic materials
1993	Paul Solomon	For contributions to the theory of the scaling of semiconductor devices
1993	Richard True	For contributions to a unified theory of electron-beam transport in high-power microwave systems
1994	Gordon Day	For technical contributions and leadership in lightwave measurement and optical fiber sensors
1994	Richard Ziolkowski	For contributions to the theory of localized waves and their realization in pulse-driven arrays and for contributions to computational electromagnetics.
1994	Aristos Christou	For contributions to the reliability of microwave power devices
1994	Giovanni De Micheli	For contribution to synthesis algorithms for the design of electronic circuits and systems
1994	Lawrence Dworsky	For contributions to piezoelectric and transmission line resonators and band pass filters for telecommunications applications
1994	Ronald Gutmann	For contributions in microwave semiconductor technology
1994	Evelyn Hu	For contributions to the development of high-resolution dry etching processes in compound semiconductors
1994	James C Hwang	For contributions to development of molecular beam epitaxy manufacturing and heterostructure devices and materials
1994	Mark Lundstrom	For contributions to heterostructure devices physics and simulation
1994	Martin Peckerar	For contributions to and leadership in X-ray and microlithography
1994	James Spratt	For contributions to the design and fabrication of radiation-hardened integrated circuits, and advances in semiconductor device technology
1994	Robert Swartz	For contributions to the design of high-speed integrated circuits for optical communication systems.
1994	Richard Temkin	For leadership in the development and application of millimeter-wave and infrared coherent sources
1994	Wen Wang	For contributions to compound semiconductor devices through innovative crystal growth
1994	Peter Zory	For contributions to the development and understanding of semiconductor and gas lasers
1995	Tiao-yuan Huang	For invention and demonstration of fully overlapped lightly doped-drain MOS transistors
1995	Andre Jaecklin	For contributions to the understanding and development of high power semiconductor devices.
1995	Chih-yuan Lu	For contributions to semiconductor technology, and for leadership in the growth of the Taiwan integrated circuit industry
1995	Tso-ping Ma	For contributions to the understanding of oxide semiconductor interface and hot carrier effects
1995	Seiki Ogura	
1995	John Pierro	For contributions to solid-state microwave low noise amplifiers, and integrated circuit developments
1995	Willy Sansen	For contributions to the systematic design of analog integrated circuits
1995	Peter Staecker	For leadership and contributions to the design and development of microwave and millimeter-wave devices and circuits
1996	Harry Charles	For leadership in electronics packaging technology for space, marine and biomedical electronic systems
1996	Sanjay Banerjee	For contributions to physics of semiconductor devices used in three-dimensional integrated circuits, and low temperature silicon-germanium epitaxy using non-thermally assisted chemical vapor deposition.
1996	David Carlson	For contributions to the discovery of methods of preparing hydrogenated amorphous silicon thin films
1996	Joseph Crowley	For contributions to education and practice in electrostatic processes, and for fundamental contributions to electrohydrodynamics.
1996	Supriyo Datta	For contributions to the understanding of electronic transport in ultra small devices
1996	J Michael Golio	For contributions to the characterization, parameter extraction, and modeling of microwave transistors
1996	Roger T. Howe	For seminal contributions to microfabrication technologies
1996	Hiroyoshi Komiya	For contributions to the development and operation of a fully automated semiconductor manufacturing line
1996	Jean P Leburton	For contributions to nonlinear electronic transport and size quantization in semiconductor quantum wells, quantum wires, and quantum dots, and the theory of the index of refraction in superlattices
1996	Alan Lewis	For contributions to advanced complementary metal oxide semiconductor devices physics and circuit design for large area microelectronics and very large scale integrated.
1996	Ephraim Suhir	For contributions to the application of mechanical and reliability engineering to physical design and analysis of microelectronic and fiber optic systems
1996	Toru Toyabe	For contributions to numerical device modeling and physics of metal–oxide–semiconductor devices
1997	Herbert Bennett	For contributions to modeling heavy doping and transport physics in semiconductors
1997	Howard Kalter	For contributions to the development of DRAM.
1997	Larry Carley	For contributions to the design o analog integrated circuits and to computer-aided analog design
1997	Andrzej Filipkowski	For contributions to engineering education
1997	Daniel M. Fleetwood	For contributions to the field of electronic devices and materials
1997	Joseph Giachino	For contributions to micro mechanical and microelectro-mechanical control systems
1997	Steven Hillenius	For contributions to the field of solid-state technology and its applications to integrated circuits
1997	Kazuhiko Honjo	For contributions to the development of gallium-arsenide integrated circuits
1997	Hiroshi Iwai	For contributions to ultra-small geometry CMOS BiCMOS devices.
1997	Mitsumasa Koyanagi	For the invention of the stacked capacitor DRAM cell
1997	Hisham Massoud	For contributions the understanding of silicon oxidation kinetics, ultrathin gate dielectrics, and the Si-SiO2 interface.
1997	Richard Snyder	For contributions to the development of high power miniature stopband filters and extremely wideband bandpass filters for microwave applications
1997	W Trybula	For contributions in developing and advancing electronics manufacturing technology.
1997	Osamu Wada	For his contributions to III-V semiconductor Optoelectronic Integrated Circuit (OEIC)
1997	Cheng Wen	For contributions to the invention and the development of copolar waveguide based microwave integrated circuit techniques
1998	Mark Law	For contributions to integrated circuits process modeling and simulation
1998	Asad Madni	For contributions to the design and development of instrumentation for electronic warfare systems
1998	Allen Barnett	For contributions and technical leadership in the development and commercialization of photovoltaic solar cells.
1998	Richard Chapman	For the development of HgCdTe imaging devices and contributions to CMOS technology
1998	Young-kai Chen	For contributions to ultra-short pulse generation using semiconductor lasers, integrated laser-modulators, and high frequency InPHBATs
1998	Michael Driver	For contributions to broadband gallium aresenide power circuits.
1998	Tadayoshi Enomoto	For contributions to the development of integrated circuits multimedia
1998	Eric Fossum	For contributions to image sensors and on-chip image processing
1998	Barry Gilbert	For development of improved electronic packaging for high performance gallium arsenide integrated circuits.
1998	Richard Kiehl	For contributions to heterostructure field-effect transistors and circuits
1998	Conilee Kirkpatrick	For leadership in development and manufacturing of III-V electronic materials and devices and their application to military and commercial systems
1998	Carlton Osburn	For contributions to silicon technology including self-aligned silicides, dielectric breakdown, and hot electron phenomena
1998	Mark Pinto	For contributions to computer-aided design of electronic devices.
1998	M Ayman Shibib	For contributions to the devices physics of heavy doping effects and the development of high voltage integrated circuits for telecommunications switching systems
1999	David Lambeth	For scientific, educational and professional contributions in the fields of magnetism, data storage systems, and electronic devices
1999	Christopher Silva	For contributions in the application of nonlinear circuits and systems theory to communications signal processing.
1999	Giorgio Baccarani	For contributions to the scaled silicon device theory.
1999	James Dayton	For contributions to the design of microwave devices
1999	Dan Goebel	For advancements in plasma sources and technology for pulsed-power switches and microwave sources
1999	Yue Kuo	For contributions to thin-film transistor technology and processes.
1999	Michael Melloch	For contributions to silicon carbide device technology
1999	Tohru Nakamura	For contributions to the development of high-speed bipolar integrated circuits
1999	Heiner Ryssel	For introduction of ion implantation technology into the German Semiconductor Industry
1999	Nihal Sinnadurai	For contributions to the field of cost effective, reliable microelectronics packaging
1999	Andrew Steckl	For contributions to focused ion beam implantation and semiconductor device fabrication
1999	Dwight Streit	For contributions to the development and manufacturing of heterojunction materials and devices
1999	Cary Yang	For contributions to microelectronic education and the understanding of interfacial properties of silicon-based devices
1999	Ian Young	For contributions to microprocessor circuit implementation and technology development
2000	Peter Asbeck	For development of heterostructure bipolar transistors and applications
2000	E Fred Schubert	For contributions to semiconductor doping and resonant-cavity devices
2000	Bogdan Wilamowski	For contributions to industrial electronics and static induction devices
2000	Jeffrey Bokor	For contributions to EUV optical lithography and deep-submicron MOSFETs
2000	Leonard Brillson	For contributions to the understanding and control of semiconductor interfaces and electrical contacts by atomic-scale techniques
2000	Caio Ferreira	For contributions to the development of switched reluctance motors and generators applied to advanced electric aircraft
2000	Tor Fjeldly	For contributions to semiconductor device modeling and the development of AIM spice
2000	Robert Kolbas	For contributions to understanding and development of quantum well heterostructure lasers and light emitters.
2000	John Haig Marsh	For contributions to development of integrated optics based on semiconductor quantum well devices
2000	Masatoshi Migitaka	For contributions to research and development of silicon high temperature integrated circuits
2000	Arto Nurmikko	For contributions to laser science and optoelectronics devices
2000	Gregory Nusinovich	For contributions to the theory of gyrotron oscillators and amplifiers and cyclotron autoresonance masers
2000	David Pulfrey	For contributions to the modeling of heterojunction bipolar semiconductor devices
2000	Ronald Schrimpf	For contributions to the understanding and the modeling of physical mechanisms governing the response of semiconductor devices to radiation exposure
2000	Yuan-chen Sun	For contributions to advanced CMOS technology
2000	Naoki Yokoyama	For contributions to the development of self-aligned gallium arsenide MESFET integrated circuits.
2001	Edward Rezek	For contributions to GaAs and InP monolithic microwave integrated circuits and optoelectronic devices
2001	Richard Ahrenkiel	For contributions to measurement of minority carrier lifetimes in semiconductor materials
2001	Barry Burke	For contributions to the technology development of charge-coupled devices for imaging and signal processing
2001	Ih-chin Chen	For leadership in the development of advanced CMOS technologies
2001	Sorin Cristoloveanu	For contributions to Silicon-on-Insulator device physics, technology, and characterization
2001	Sang Hoo Dhong	For contribution to high speed processor and memory chip design
2001	Samir El-ghazaly	For contributions to the analysis and simulations of microwave devices and circuits.
2001	Cesar Gonzales	For contributions to MPEG encoding algorithms and leadership in their use.
2001	Aditya Gupta	For contributions to the advancement of microwave monolithic integrated circuit technology and leadership in the development of manufacturable processes
2001	Yoshiaki Hagiwara	For pioneering work on, and development of, solid-state imagers.
2001	Wei Hwang	For contributions to high density cell technology and high speed Dynamic Random Access Memory design
2001	Kei May Lau	For contributions to III-V compound semiconductor heterostructure materials and devices
2001	Chin Lee	For pioneering research in fluxless bonding technology and contributions to thermal design tools for electronic devices and packages.
2001	Baruch Levush	For leadership in the development of theoretical and computational models of free electron radiation sources
2001	Kenji Nishi	For contributions to semiconductor process and device modeling and the development of software for their simulation
2001	Jon Orloff	For contributions to Focussed Ion Beam Technology
2001	Stephen Pearto	For development of advanced semiconductor processing techniques and their application to compound semiconductor devices
2001	John Przybysz	For contributions in the development and application of Josephson digital circuits to electronic systems, especially radars, communication satellites and data switching networks
2001	Muhammad Rashid	For leadership in power electronics education and contributions to the analysis and design methodologies of solid-state power converters
2001	Krishna Shenai	For contributions to the understanding, development and application of power semiconductor devices and circuits
2001	Ritu Shrivastava	For contributions to high performance CMOS memory technology and product development
2001	James Sturm	For contributions to novel silicon-based semiconductor devices and large-area electronics
2001	Yang Yuan Wang	For leadership in China's semiconductor research and education
2002	Ming Wu	For contributions to optical micro-electro-mechanical systems and high-speed optoelectronics
2002	Narain Arora	For contributions to the development of MOSFET compact models for circuit simulation
2002	Joachim Burghartz	For contributions to integrated high-speed and radio-frequency silicon devices and components
2002	Keh-yung Cheng	For contribution to semiconductor heterostructure materials and devices using molecular beam epitaxy
2002	Nico De Rooij	For contributions to microelectrical/mechanical systems and technology transfer to the marketplace
2002	Evangelos Eleftheriou	For contributions to equalization and coding, and for noise-predictive maximum likelihood detection in magnetic recording.
2002	J. Haslett	For contributions to high temperature instrumentation and noise in solid-state electronics
2002	Chennupati Jagadish	For contributions to III-V compound semiconductor optoelectronic device integration
2002	Ralph James	For contributions to and leadership in the development of wide band-gap compound semiconductor devices used for detecting and imaging X- and gamma-ray radiation
2002	Allan Johnston	For contributions to the understanding of space radiation effects in optoelectronics
2002	Leda Lunardi	For contributions to the development of high-performance 1.55 um monolithically integrated photoreceiver for optical communication
2002	Lawrence Pileggi	For contributions to simulation and modeling of integrated circuits
2002	Wolfgang Porod	For contributions to circuit concepts and architectures for nanoelectronics
2002	Rajendra Singh	For contributions to and technical leadership in the materials processing and manufacturing of semiconductor devices
2002	Manfred Thumm	For contributions to the development and application of gyrotron oscillators, oversized microwave mode converters and transmission line components
2002	Toshiaki Tsuchiya	For contributions to the understanding of the reliability physics of MOS devices and the development of hot-carrier-immune CMOS technologies
2002	Charles Tu	For contributions to molecular beam epitaxy of novel III-V semiconductors
2002	Jan Van Der Spiegel	For contributions in biologically motivated sensors and information processing systems
2002	Toshiaki Yachi	For contributions to power semiconductor and micro-magnetic devices.
2003	Jamal Deen	For contributions to modeling, noise, and parameter extraction in silicon transistors and high speed photodetectors
2003	David Frank	For contributions to solid-state devices and ultra-small CMOS devices.
2003	William Gallagher	For contributions to the development of oxide-barrier tunnel junctions for superconducting and magnetic device applications
2003	David Harame	For contributions to the development of SiGe Heterojunction Bipolar Transistor and BiCMOS technologies
2003	Nan Jokerst	For contributions to the integration and packaging of optoelectronic devices for the realization of optical interconnections and interfaces.
2003	Hoi-sing Kwok	For pioneering research in liquid crystal display technology
2003	Burn Lin	For contributions to lithography theory, tooling, masks, and fabrication technology
2003	Tadashi Nishimura	For leadership in the development of advanced CMOS devices and process technologies
2003	Umberto Ravaioli	For contributions to Monte Carlo simulation of electron devices
2003	Mark Rodwell	For contributions to high speed electron devices and integrated circuits
2004	Stephen Goodnick	For contributions to carrier transport fundamentals and semiconductor devices
2004	Gary Bronner	For contributions to dynamic random access memory technology
2004	Constantin Bulucea	For contributions to transistor engineering in the area of power electronics
2004	Casimer De Cusatis	For contributions to fiber optic data communication systems
2004	Robert Eklund	For leadership in the development and manufacturing of sub-micron CMOS technologies
2004	Hiromu Fujioka	For contributions to electron beam testing of semiconductor devices and circuits
2004	Erik Heijne	For contributions to semiconductor detector systems and radiation tolerant detector readout electronics
2004	Shuji Ikeda	For contributions to the development and manufacturing of static random access memory
2004	Colin Mcandrew	For contributions to compact and statistical modeling of semiconductor devices
2004	Sawaki Nobuhiko	For contributions to the development of group III-nitride semiconductor materials and devices
2004	Hiroshi Nozawa	For contributions to nonvolatile semiconductor memories
2004	Mikael Ostling	For contributions to semiconductor device technology and education
2004	Jerzy Ruzyllo	For contributions to ultrathin oxidation in microelectronic manufacturing
2004	Victor Ryzhii	For contributions to the development of quantum well infrared photodetectors and quantum dot infrared photodetectors.
2004	David Scott	For contributions to CMOS and BICMOS technology and circuits
2004	Douglas Verret	For leadership in the commercialization of bipolar and BiCMOS technologies
2004	Shin-tson Wu	For contributions to liquid crystal displays and tunable photonic devices
2005	Jason C Woo	For contributions to nanoscale silicon on insulator and bulk metal oxide semiconductor device physics and technology
2005	Donald Wunsch	For contributions to hardware implementations of reinforcement and unsupervised learning
2005	Supriyo Bandyopadhyay	For contributions to device applications of nanostructures.
2005	Robert Baumann	For contributions to the understanding of the reliability impact of terrestrial radiation mechanisms in commercial electronics
2005	Duane Boning	For contributions to modeling and control in semiconductor manufacturing
2005	Clifton Fonstad	For leadership in compound semiconductor heterostructure devices.
2005	William Frensley	For contributions to nanometer-scale quantum semiconductor devices
2005	Guido Groeseneken	For his contributions to the physical understanding and the modeling of reliability of metal oxide semiconductor field effect transistors
2005	George Heiter	For contributions to microwave circuits, including linear amplifiers and space diversity combiners
2005	Tadao Ishibashi	For contributions to high-speed and optoelectronic semiconductor devices
2005	Noble Johnson	For contributions to the control of impurities in semiconductors
2005	Masaaki Kuzuhara	For contributions to Group III-V microwave power devices.
2005	Joy Laskar	For contributions to the modeling and development of high frequency communication modules
2005	Kartikeya Mayaram	For contributions to coupled device and circuit simulation
2005	Deirdre Meldrum	For contributions to genome automation
2005	Hisayo Momose	For contributions to ultra-thin gate oxide metal oxide semiconductor fields effect transistors
2005	Yutaka Ohmori	For contributions to the development of organic and semiconductor light emitting materials and devices
2005	Shinji Okazaki	For contributions to the resolution enhancement technology in optical and electron-beam lithography.
2005	Fang Zheng Peng	For contributions to multilevel power converter topology, control, and applications.
2005	Mark Rodder	For contributions to deep sub-micron complementary metal oxide semiconductor technology
2005	Enrico Sangiorgi	For contributions to the modeling and characterization of hot carriers and non stationary transport effects in small silicon devices
2005	Phillip Smith	For contributions to microwave high electron mobility transistors
2005	Juzer Vasi	For leadership in microelectronics education
2005	Sophie Verdonckt-Vandebroek	For leadership in developing document systems
2005	Lois Walsh	For leadership in electronic device reliability
2005	Kazuo Yano	For contributions to nanostructured-silicon devices and circuits and advanced CMOS logic
2006	Andreas Andreou	For contributions to energy efficient sensory microsystems
2006	William Chen	For contributions to packaging and assembly technology
2006	Steve Chung	For contributions to reliability in ultra-thin-oxide complementary metal oxide semiconductor (CMOS) devices
2006	Hector De Los Santos	For contributions to radio frequency (RF) and microwave micro electromechanical systems (MEMS) devices and applications
2006	Simon Deleonibus	For contributions to nanoscaled complementary metal oxide semiconductor (CMOS) devices technology.
2006	Martin Giles	For contributions to technology computer aided design (TCAD) modeling of processes and devices.
2006	Hideki Hayashi	For contributions to and leadership in compound semiconductor device technologies
2006	Larry Hornbeck	For invention, development, and applications of the Digital Micromirror Device
2006	Qin Huang	For contributions to emitter turn-off thyristor technology and its applications
2006	Gary May	For contributions to semiconductor manufacturing and engineering education
2006	David Seiler	For leadership in the development of critical metrology and measurement science at the micro and nano levels
2006	Usha Varshney	For technical leadership in sensor technologies and systems
2006	Katsuyoshi Washio	For contributions to high-speed silicon and silicon germanium bipolar/Bi complementary metal oxide semiconductors (CMOS) device and circuit technologies
2006	Burnell West	For contributions to high-performance automatic test equipment
2006	Paul Franzon	For contributions to chip-package codesign.
2007	Giovanni Ghione	For contributions to numerical physics-based modelling of passive and active integrated microwave components
2007	Victor Chen	For contributions to time-frequency analysis for radar imaging and target feature extraction
2007	Kwong-kit Choi	For contributions to quantum well infrared photodetector technology
2007	T Paul Chow	For contributions to smart power semiconductor devices
2007	Charvaka Duvvury	For contributions to electrostatic discharge devices and design protection methods for integrated circuit applications
2007	Philip Hochan	For contributions to the development of low-cost flip-chip technology
2007	Takayuki Kawahara	For contributions to low-voltage low-power random access memory circuits
2007	Bumman Kim	For contributions to linear power amplifiers, gallium arsenide microwave and millimeter-wave power devices and monolithic microwave integrated circuits
2007	Tsu-jae King	For applications of silicon-germanium thin films to metal oxide semiconductor transistors and microelectro mechanical systems
2007	Mitiko Miura-Mattausch	For contributions to nanoscale metal oxide semiconductor field effect transistor compact modeling
2007	Clark Tu-cuong Nguyen	For contributions to the physics and technology of microelectromechanical systems
2007	Jayasimha Prasad	For contributions to compound semiconductor heterojunction bipolar transistors
2007	Pasqualina Sarro	For contributions to micromachined sensors, actuators, and microsystems
2007	Yan-kuin Su	For contributions to optoelectronics and nanophotonics research and education
2007	John Wood	For contributions to the nonlinear microwave device and behavioral modeling, and technology
2008	John Booske	For contributions to vacuum electronics and microwave processing of materials
2008	Akintunde Akinwande	For contributions to the development of digital self-aligned gate technology and vacuum microelectronic devices
2008	Colombo Bolognesi	For contributions to millimeter-wave antimonide-based heterojunction bipolar transistors
2008	Joe Brewer	For contributions to nonvolatile memory integrated circuit technology and digital signal processor architecture
2008	Carlos Diaz	For contributions to deep sub-micron foundry CMOS technology
2008	Gary Fedder	For contributions to integrated micro-electro-mechanical-system processes and design methodologies
2008	Michael Fu	For contributions to stochastic gradient estimation and simulation optimization
2008	Paolo Gargini	For leadership in the globalization and implementation of the technology roadmap for semiconductors
2008	Fernando Guarin	For contributions to semiconductor materials and reliability
2008	Hiroki Hamada	For contributions to red semiconductor laser diodes and polycrystalline silicon thin-film transistors
2008	Gregg Higashi	For contributions to wet chemical processing of silicon
2008	Minghwei Hong	For contributions to III-V semiconductor MOSFET transistors
2008	Harold Hosack	For contributions to resonant tunneling and imaging devices
2008	Eishi Ibe	For contributions to neutron-induced soft-error analysis for semiconductor memory devices
2008	Ming-dou Ker	For contributions to electrostatic protection in integrated circuits, and performance optimization of VLSI micro-systems
2008	Rakesh Kumar	For entrepreneurial leadership in the field of integrated circuits
2008	Massimo Rudan	For contributions to theory and modeling of current transport in semiconductor devices
2008	Jyuo-min Shyu	For leadership in the microelectronics industry
2008	Michael Simpson	For contributions to nanotechnology in engineered devices and biology
2008	Hoi-jun Yoo	For contributions to low-power and high-speed VLSI design
2008	Paul Kit Lai Yu	For contributions to semiconductor waveguide modulators and detectors
2009	Homer Alan Mantooth	For contributions to modeling of power electronic devices
2009	Yves Baeyens	For contributions to the broadband and millimeter-wave circuits for optical and wireless communications
2009	Aleksander Braginski	For leadership in research and development in magnetics and applied superconductivity
2009	Cor Claeys	For contributions to semiconductor device physics, defect engineering, and low frequency noise characterization
2009	Vikram Dalal	For contributions to thin-film photovoltaic energy conversion materials and devices
2009	Nicholas Economou	For leadership in developing and commercializing focused ion beam systems
2009	Tahir Ghani	For contributions to deep submicron metal oxide semiconductor transistor development for microprocessors
2009	Shoji Kawahito	For contributions to sensor interfacing, sensor signal processing and multiple-level signaling
2009	Konstyantyn Lukin	For contributions to research in noise and chaotic waveform radars
2009	Timothy Maloney	For contributions to electrostatic discharge protection of semiconductor components
2009	Joe cpherson	For contributions to reliability physics and engineering and application to integrated circuits
2009	Matthias Passlack	For contributions to III-V metal–oxide–semiconductor technology
2009	Adam Skorek	For contributions to electro-thermal analysis of industrial processes
2009	Robert Wallace	For contributions to high-k gate dielectric materials for integrated circuits
2009	Albert Wang	For contributions to design-for-reliability and system-on-chip
2009	Shan Wang	For contributions to magnetic materials and device
2009	Richard Withers	For development of superconductive and cryogenic radio frequency circuits for nuclear magnetic resonance probes
2009	Zhiping Yu	For contributions to modeling and simulation of advanced semiconductor devices
2009	Enrico Zanoni	For contributions to reliability of compound semiconductor devices
2009	John Zolper	For leadership in compound semiconductor electronics
2010	Amitava Chatterjee	For contributions to complementary metal oxide semiconductor device technology and on-chip electrostatic discharge protection
2010	Mario Dagenais	For contributions to photon correlation, semiconductor devices, and integration technologies
2010	Long-sheng Fan	For contributions to Micro Electro-Mechanical Systems
2010	Yogesh Gianchandani	For contributions to silicon-based microactuators and on-chip microplasmas
2010	Masashi Horiguchi	For contributions to circuit technologies for high-density low-power memories
2010	Dimitris Ioannou	For contributions to reliability and characterization of silicon-on-insulator devices and materials
2010	Yusuf Leblebici	For contributions to reliability and design techniques for integrated circuits and systems
2010	Patrick Lenahan	For contributions to understanding of radiation damage and reliabilityof metal-oxide semiconductor devices
2010	Ching Fuh Lin	For contributions to broadband semiconductor optical devices
2010	Kaizad Mistry	For contributions to high performance complementary metal-oxide semiconductor technology and reliability
2010	Arokia Nathan	For contributions to thin film transistor technologies
2010	Kwok Ng	For contributions to the optimization of intrinsic parasitics in metal-oxide semiconductor field-effect transistor design
2010	Yasuhisa Omura	For contributions of silicon on insulator devices technology, analysis, and modeling
2010	Gary Patton	For contributions to silicon germanium heterojunction bipolar transistors
2010	Jin Koo Rhee	For contributions to Gallium Arsenide, Microwave and Millimeter-wave Monolithic Integrated Circuits
2010	Thomas Skotnicki	For contributions to development of metal-oxide semiconductor field effect transistor models and advanced semiconductor technologies
2010	Robert White	For contributions to digital power management in power systems for computing and telecommunications equipment
2010	Shumpei Yamazaki	For contributions to, and leadership in the industrialization of non-volatile memory and thin film transistor technologies
2010	George Zentai	For contributions to the advancement of digital x-ray imagers
2011	Paul R. Berger	For contributions to the understanding, development, and fabrication of silicon-based resonant interband tunneling devices and circuits
2011	Paul Davis	For development of bipolar integrated circuits
2011	Asen Asenov	For contributions to the understanding and prediction of semiconductor device variability via modeling and simulation
2011	Albert Chin	For contributions to high-K dielectrics and metal gate electrodes for complementary metal-oxide semiconductor
2011	Jen-inn Chyi	For contributions to III-V compound semiconductor optoelectronic devices
2011	Bernard Dieny	For contributions to the development of nanomagnetism and spin-electronic devices, including spin valves
2011	Véronique Ferlet-Cavrois	For contributions to understanding of radiation effects on electronic devices
2011	Digh Hisamoto	For contributions to complementary metal-oxide semiconductor devices
2011	Mark Itzler	For leadership in avalanche photodiode technologies
2011	Eun Kim	For contributions to microelectromechanical systems
2011	Dirk B M Klaassen	For contributions to semiconductor device modeling and simulation
2011	Thomas Kuech	For contributions to electronic materials growth for epitaxial devices
2011	Santosh Kurinec	For leadership in integrating innovative microelectronics research in engineering education
2011	James Lu	For contributions to three-dimensional integrated circuit technology
2011	Paolo Lugli	For contributions to nanostructured materials and devices
2011	Chris Mack	For contributions to semiconductor microlithography
2011	Vladimir Mitin	For contributions to sensors and detectors
2011	Kenneth O.	For contributions to ultra-high frequency complementary metal-oxide semiconductor circuits
2011	Ir Puers	For contributions to implantable microelectromechanical systems
2011	Zheng Shen	For contributions to the development of lateral power metal-oxide semiconductor field-effect transistors
2011	James Stathis	For contributions to complementary metal-oxide semiconductor gate-oxide reliability
2011	Dennis Sylvester	For contributions to energy-efficient integrated circuits
2011	Jie Xue	For contributions to survivability and quality of service in computer networks
2011	Jeffrey Welser	For leadership in emerging device technologies for computer applications
2012	Clifford King	For contributions to silicon germanium heterojunction devices and technologies
2012	John Suehle	For contributions to the understanding of thin gate dielectric films
2012	Anant Agarwal	For contributions to silicon carbide power device technology
2012	Kaustav Banerjee	For contributions to modeling and design of nanoscale integrated circuit interconnects
2012	Zeynep Celik-butler	For contributions to the understanding of noise and fluctuation phenomena in solid-state devices
2012	Luigi Colombo	For contributions to infrared detectors and high-k gate dielectrics
2012	J David	For contributions to avalanche-photodiodes and impact ionization in semiconductors
2012	Donald Gardner	For contributions to integrated circuit interconnects and integrated inductor technology
2012	Nadim Haddad	For development of radiation hardened semiconductor device technology and products for space applications
2012	Wilfried Haensch	For contributions to metal?oxide?semiconductor field-effect transistor device physics and scaling
2012	Francis Kub	For leadership in the development of wide bandgap semiconductor power electronics
2012	Oleg Mukhanov	For leadership in research and development of superconducting digital electronics
2012	Andreas Neuber	For contributions to the physics of dielectric surface flashover in high electric fields
2012	Anthony Oates	For contributions to the engineering and understanding of interconnect reliability in integrated circuits
2012	Shunri Oda	For contributions to silicon quantum dot devices
2012	William Palmer	For leadership and contributions in microwave and millimeter wave systems and sources
2012	Ci-ling Pan	For contributions to optoelectronic and liquid crystal devices for ultrafast and terahertz photonics
2012	Unil Perera	For contributions to quantum structures for infrared and terahertz detection
2012	Valluri Rao	For contributions to the characterization technologies for microprocessor and logic circuits
2012	Johnny Sin	For contributions to the design and commercialization of power semiconductor devices
2012	Chris Van De Walle	For contributions to the theory of interfaces, doping and defects in semiconductors
2012	Edward Yu	For contributions to characterization and device applications of semiconductor nanostructures
2013	Arthur Morris	For development and commercialization of CMOS radio frequency micro electro mechanical systems
2013	John Verboncoeur	For contributions to computational plasma physics and plasma device applications
2013	Ramachandra Achar	For contributions to interconnect and signal integrity analysis in high-speed designs
2013	Robert Aitken	For contributions to testing and diagnosis of integrated circuits
2013	Carter Armstrong	For technical leadership in the development of high power microwave and millimeter-wave radiation sources, especially their power modules
2013	David Cumming	For contributions to integrated sensors and microsystem technology
2013	Suman Datta	For contributions to high-performance advanced silicon and compound semiconductor transistor technologies
2013	Takatomo Enoki	For contributions to compound semiconductor high speed integrated circuits for optical and wireless communication systems
2013	Kenneth Hansen	For technical leadership in wireless communications
2013	Ravi Mahajan	For contributions to electronic packaging technology and thermal management of microprocessors
2013	Cian Mathuna	For leadership in the development of power supply using micromagnetics on silicon
2013	Carlos Mazure	For leadership in the field of silicon on insulator and memory technologies
2013	Gaudenzio Meneghesso	For contributions to the reliability physics of compound semiconductors devices
2013	Subhasish Mitra	For contributions to design and test of robust integrated circuits
2013	Masaaki Niwa	For contributions to CMOS technology using high dielectric constant materials and metal gate
2013	David Perreault	For contributions to design and application of very high frequency power electronic converters
2013	John Robertson	For contributions to the understanding of high-k dielectrics and metal gate electrodes for CMOS technology
2013	John Spargo	For leadership in superconducting electronics and related technologies
2013	R P Thakur	For leadership in development and implementation of single-wafer technology in semiconductor manufacturing
2013	Thomas Theis	For leadership in the development of semiconductor technologies
2013	Chen-hua Yu	For leadership in development of interconnect technology for integrated circuits
2014	Richard Brown	For contributions to microsystem design
2014	Seiichi Aritome	For contributions to flash memory technologies
2014	Babu Chalamala	For contributions to the development of advanced materials and device technologies for vacuum microelectronics and field emission displays
2014	Shoou-jinn Chang	For contributions to nano scale photonic, electronic, and sensing devices
2014	Jing Kevin Chen	For contributions to compound semiconductor heterojunction transistor technologies
2014	Donald Disney	For contributions to power integrated circuits and energy efficiency applications
2014	Ichiro Fujimori	For contributions to oversampled data converters and gigabit wireline transceivers
2014	Kazunari Ishimaru	For contributions to static random access memory and complementary metal-oxide semiconductor devices
2014	Byoungho Lee	For contributions to diffractive optics and three-dimensional display technologies
2014	Taiichi Otsuji	For contributions to plasmonic semiconductor integrated device technology for terahertz sensing
2014	Daniel Radack	For leadership in microwave and millimeter-wave integrated circuit technologies and packaging techniques
2014	Jean-pierre Raskin	For contributions to the characterization of silicon-on-insulator RF MOSFETs and MEMS devices
2014	Jacobus Swart	For contributions to microelectronics education in Brazil
2014	Srinivas Tadigadapa	For contributions to microeletromechanical systems for fluidic and biochemical sensors
2014	Mircea Stan	For contributions to power- and temperature-aware design of VLSI circuits and systems
2015	David Abe	For leadership and contributions to the development of high power microwave and millimeter wave vacuum electronic devices
2015	C Auth	For contributions to strained silicon transistor technology
2015	Victor Bright	For contributions to micro- and nano-electromechanical systems
2015	John Conley	For contributions to semiconductor process technology to improve radiation hardening of MOS devices
2015	John Dallesasse	For contributions to oxidation of III-V semiconductors for photonic device manufacturing
2015	Weileun Fang	For contributions to measurement methods and process technologies for micro-electro-mechanical systems
2015	Lorenzo Faraone	For development of semiconductor optoelectronic materials and devices
2015	D Gupta	For contributions to superconductor digital radio-frequency receivers
2015	Ray-Hua Horng	For contributions to high brightness light emitting diodes
2015	Giuseppe Iannaccone	For contributions to modeling transport and noise processes in nanoelectronic devices
2015	Safa Kasap	For contributions to photoconductive sensors for x-ray imaging
2015	Tsunenobu Kimoto	For contributions to silicon carbide materials and devices
2015	Hiroshi Kondoh	For contributions to microwave and millimeter wave MMIC technologies
2015	Paul Lee	For contributions to the development of CMOS image sensor technology and the pinned photo-diode active pixel sensor
2015	Yong Liu	For contributions in power electronics packaging
2015	Susan Lord	For professional leadership and contributions to engineering education
2015	Roger Malik	For contributions to heterojunction compound semiconductor materials and devices
2015	Sokrates Pantelides	For contributions to point-defect dynamics in semiconductor devices
2015	Luca Selmi	For research on carrier transport and reliability of semiconductor devices
2015	Mark Weichold	For contributions to international development of engineering education
2015	Gaozhi Xiao	For contributions to the development of safety and security monitoring instrumentation and measurement technologies
2016	Bruce Carlsten	For contributions to high-brightness electron beams and vacuum electron devices
2016	Chorng-ping Chang	For contributions to replacement gate and shallow trench isolation for CMOS technology
2016	Mukta Farooq	For contributions to 3D integration and interconnect technology
2016	Patrick Fay	For contributions to compound semiconductor tunneling and high-speed device technologies
2016	Qing-an Huang	For contributions to modeling and packaging of microsensors and microactuators
2016	Adrian Ionescu	For contributions to the development of novel devices for low power applications
2016	Alvin Joseph	For contributions to silicon-germanium bipolar-CMOS and RF silicon-on-insulator technology
2016	Jong-ho Lee	For contributions to development and characterization of bulk multiple-gate field effect transistors
2016	Ellis Meng	For contributions to biomedical microelectromechanical systems
2016	Leonard Register	For contributions to modeling of charge transport in nanoscale CMOS devices
2016	Thomas Silva	For contributions to the understanding and applications of magnetization dynamics
2016	Toru Tanzawa	For contributions to integrated high-voltage circuits
2016	Akira Toriumi	For contributions to device physics and materials engineering for advanced CMOS technology
2017	Hulya Kirkici	For contributions to high frequency, high field dielectric breakdown and electrical insulation for space and aerospace power systems
2017	Edoardo Charbon	For contributions to solid-state single photon avalanche detectors and their applications in imaging
2017	Wei-ting Chien	For leadership in reliability management
2017	Christopher Hierold	For contributions to microelectromechanical sensors and microthermoelectric energy harvesting
2017	Ru Huang	For contributions to multi-gate silicon nanowire transistor technology
2017	Quanxi Jia	For contributions to coated superconductors and metal-oxide thin films for electronic applications
2017	Hongrui Jiang	For contributions to materials and micro-scale optical tools for medical imaging
2017	Richard King	For contributions to high-performance space and terrestrial photovoltaics technology
2017	Steven Koester	For contributions to group-IV electronic and photonic devices
2017	Donald Lie	For contributions to high linearity and high efficiency silicon RF power amplifiers for broadband wireless applications
2017	Theresa Mayer	For contributions to nanomaterials integration and directed assembly
2017	Junichi Nakamura	For leadership in CMOS image sensors
2017	Borivoje Nikolic	For contributions to energy-efficient design of digital and mixed-signal circuits
2017	Tomas Palacios	For contributions to gallium nitride electron devices and two-dimensional materials
2017	Andrei Vladimirescu	For contributions to the development and commercial adoption of SPICE circuit simulation
2017	Sorin Voinigescu	For contributions to silicon and silicon-germanium microwave and millimeter-wave devices and integrated circuits
2017	Xin Zhang	For contributions to microelectromechanical systems
2018	Pamela Ann Abshire	For contributions to CMOS biosensors
2018	Timothy Boykin	For contributions to atomistic models for semiconductor device simulation
2018	Kuan-neng Chen	For contributions to 3D integrated circuit and packaging technologies
2018	Michel Houssa	For contributions to materials characterization for advanced MOSFETs
2018	Jaroslav Hynecek	For contributions to solid-state image sensors
2018	Michael Krames	For leadership in GaN-based light-emitting device physics and its commercialization
2018	Isaac Lagnado	For leadership in the development of silicon-on-sapphire technology
2018	Chee Wee Liu	For contributions to high-mobility Ge and SiGe MOSFETs
2018	Wei Lu	For contributions to development of neuromorphic systems
2018	Zhenqiang Ma	For contributions to flexible and biodegradable microwave electronics
2018	Saibal Mukhopadhyay	For contributions to energy-efficient and robust computing systems design
2018	Hidetoshi Onodera	For contributions to variation-aware design and analysis of integrated circuits
2018	Philippe Paillet	For contributions to the understanding of radiation effects in electronics
2018	Joseph Pawlowski	For contributions to memory system interfaces
2018	Seiji Samukawa	For contributions to damage-free plasma processing for nano-device manufacturing
2018	Gregory Snider	For contributions to single electron based computing technology
2018	Shuji Tanaka	For contributions to micro-electromechanical systems for acoustic wave devices, physical sensors, and power generation
2018	Victor Veliadis	For contributions to development of SiC power devices
2018	Robert Weikle	For contributions to millimeter-wave and submillimeter-wave electronics and instrumentation for terahertz frequencies
2018	Huikai Xie	For contributions to micro-electromechanical optical scanning systems
2018	Jianbin Xu	For contributions to nanoscale electronic materials and devices
2018	Anthony Yen	For leadership in extreme-ultraviolet lithography for high volume manufacture of integrated circuits
2019	Matthias Bauer	For contributions to growth technologies for alloys for transistors
2019	Meng-fan Chang	For contributions to static and nonvolatile memories for embedded systems
2019	Kin Ping Cheung	For contributions to plasma process-induced damage in integrated circuits
2019	Hiroshi Ito	For contributions to high-speed photodiodes for millimeter and terahertz wave generation
2019	Christoph Jungemann	For contributions to hierarchical simulation of semiconductor devices
2019	Ali Khakifirooz	For contributions to fully depleted silicon-on-insulator complementary-metal-oxide-semiconductor technology
2019	Chih-huang Lai	For contributions to magnetic information storage and spintronic devices
2019	Roger Lake	For contributions to quantum mechanical electronic device modeling
2019	Miroslav Micovic	For contributions to gallium nitride electronics
2019	Theodore Moise	For contributions to ferroelectric memory development and engineering
2019	Katsu Nakamura	For contributions to integrated circuits for digital imaging
2019	Stewart Rauch	For contributions to microelectronics reliability
2019	Samar Saha	For contributions to compact modeling of silicon field-effect transistors
2019	Sayeef Salahuddin	For contributions to low power electronic and spintronic devices
2019	Venkat Selvamanickam	For contributions to development and manufacturing of superconductor tapes
2019	Munehiro Tada	For contributions to copper interconnects for very-large-scale integration
2019	Harkhoe Tan	For contributions to compound semiconductor optoelectronic materials and devices
2019	Deepak Uttamchandani	For contributions to photonics-based sensing
2020	Geoffrey W. Burr	For contributions to neuromorphic computing using non-volatile memories
2020	Ting-chang Chang	For contributions to non-volatile memory and thin-film transistor technologies
2020	Pr Chidambaram	For contributions to strain engineering in MOSFETs and to designtechnology co-optimization
2020	Chion Chui	For contributions to high-mobility germanium metal-oxidesemiconductor devices
2022	Sarah Kurtz	For contributions to photovoltaic devices and systems reliability
2026	Bonnie Weir	For contributions to gate dielectric breakdown in semiconductor devices and standards

== See also ==
- List of IEEE Fellows
