= IEEE Joseph F. Keithley Award in Instrumentation and Measurement =

- Awarded for: Outstanding contributions in electrical measurements
- Presented by: Institute of Electrical and Electronics Engineers
- First award: 2004
- Website: IEEE Joseph F. Keithley Award in Instrumentation and Measurement

The IEEE Joseph F. Keithley Award in Instrumentation and Measurement is a Technical Field Award of the Institute of Electrical and Electronics Engineers (IEEE) that was established by the IEEE Board of Directors in 2001 and first awarded in 2004. It is named in honor of Joseph F. Keithley, the founder of Keithley Instruments, and it replaced the previous IEEE Morris E. Leeds Award, which was named in honor of Morris E. Leeds, an inventor of electrical measuring devices and controls. The award is presented annually for outstanding contributions in electrical measurements, and is sponsored by Keithley Instruments and the IEEE Instrumentation and Measurement Society.

The award is not to be confused with the similarly-named Joseph F. Keithley Award For Advances in Measurement Science of the American Physical Society, which was also endowed by Keithley Instruments.

== Recipients ==
The award has been given to the following people.

- 2004: Henry Parsons Hall
- 2005: Clark A. Hamilton
- 2006: Alessandro M. Ferrero
- 2007: Douglas Kent Rytting
- 2008: Robert G. Fulks
- 2009: Bryan P. Kibble
- (Not awarded in 2010)
- 2011: Reza Zoughi
- 2012: Rik Pintelon
- 2013: Dylan Forrest Williams
- 2014: Thomas E. Linnenbrink
- 2015: Jean-Charles Bolomey
- 2016: Samuel P. Benz
- 2017: Jerome Blair
- 2018: David W. Allan
- 2019: Alan Finkel
- 2020: Dario Petri
- 2021: Eric W. Strid and Reed K. Gleason
- 2022: Ian Hunter
- 2023: Barry M. Wood, Carlos Sanchez and Richard G. Green
- 2024: Deepak G. Uttamchandani
- 2025: Alexander Bergmann
- 2026: Georg Schitter
- 2027: Pasquale Daponte
