= Edward Yu =

Edward Yu may refer to:

- Edward T. Yu, American engineer and physicist
- Edward W. Yu, American crystallographer
