= Keithley =

Keithley is a surname. Notable people with the surname include:

- Gary Keithley (born 1951), American football player
- Joe Keithley (born 1956), Canadian punk musician
- June Keithley (1947–2013), Filipino actress and broadcast journalist

== Businesses ==
- Keithley Instruments
