= Lunardi =

Lunardi is an Italian surname. Notable people with the surname include:

- Alessandra Lunardi (born 1958), Italian mathematician
- Dino Lunardi (born 1978), French racing driver
- Ivan Lunardi (born 1973), Italian ski jumper
- Joe Lunardi, American sportscaster
- Leda Lunardi, Brazilian-American electrical engineer
- Paul J. Lunardi (1921–2013), American politician
- Pietro Lunardi (born 1939), Italian politician
- Vincenzo Lunardi (1754–1806), Italian balloonist

== See also ==
- Lunardini
