= Enoki (disambiguation) =

Enoki can refer to:

- Enokitake (mushroom)
- Enoki Films
- Enoki-class destroyer, a class of destroyers in the Imperial Japanese Navy
  - Japanese destroyer Enoki (1918), lead ship of the class
- Hiroyuki Enoki
- Yasukuni Enoki (榎 泰邦), Japanese diplomat
- Enoki Irqittuq
- Takatomo Enoki, Japanese engineer
- Junya Enoki, Japanese voice actor
- Enoki surface
- The Enoki family in the manga series Baby and Me
