= Lunardini =

Lunardini is an Italian surname. Notable people with the surname include:

- Cecilia Lunardini, Italian astrophysicist
- Francesco Lunardini (born 1984), Italian footballer

== See also ==
- Lunardi
