= Yoshiaki Hagiwara =

Yoshiaki Hagiwara (July 4, 1948 – ) is a Japanese scientist, engineer, and inventor who spent his career at Sony developing image sensors and related technologies.

== Early life ==
Under his birth name Yoshiaki Tsuneo Daimon, he earned his BS degree in electrical engineering and physics at the California Institute of Technology in 1971, followed by is MS degree in 1972 and Ph.D. in 1975 at the same University, under the guidance of his advisor Carver Mead. He changed his name to Hagiwara upon getting married in 1974.

== Inventions ==
The first mass-produced consumer CCD video camera, the CCD-G5, was released by Sony in 1983, based on a prototype developed by Hagiwara in 1981.

Hagiwara was elected Fellow of the IEEE in 2001, "For pioneering work on, and development of, solid-state imagers", for, among other things, his 1975 invention of a photodiode that was later branded by Sony the "hole accumulation device" (HAD), and which Sony and he claim as the origin of the pinned photodiode.

== See also ==
- List of fellows of IEEE Electron Devices Society
