= Deepak Uttamchandani =

British electrical engineer and academic

Deepak G Uttamchandani FRSE FIEEE FIET FInstP
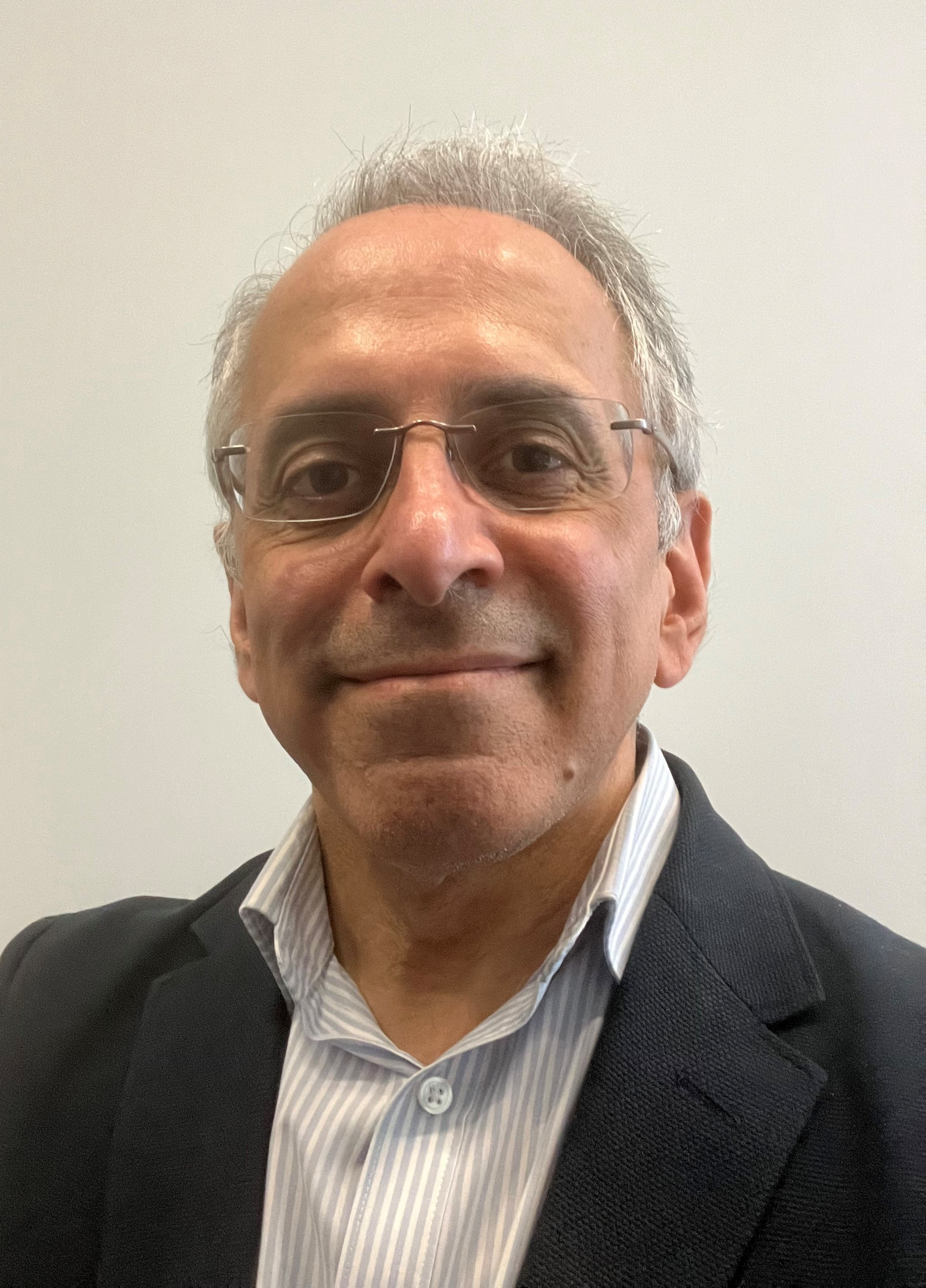
- Uttamchandani in 2025
- Born: 1958 (age 67–68)
- Education: University College London (Msc, PhD)
- Known for: Fiber-optic sensors; Photonics; MEMS
- Awards: IEEE Joseph F. Keithley Award in Instrumentation and Measurement (2024); IEEE Sensors Council Technical Achievement Award (2017)
- Scientific career
- Fields: Electronic and Electrical Engineering
- Workplaces: University of Strathclyde
- Website: www.strath.ac.uk/staff/professordeepakuttamchandani/

Deepak G Uttamchandani is a British electrical engineer and academic, and Emeritus Professor. at the University of Strathclyde, Glasgow, United Kingdom. A UK Chartered Engineer in electrical engineering, he received a PhD from University College London for research in the field of optical sensor multiplexing using current-induced optical frequency modulation of a laser diode. He was elected Fellow of the Institute of Electrical and Electronics Engineers (see entry for 2019), Fellow of the Royal Society of Edinburgh in 2019, and is Member of IEEE-Eta Kappu Nu (HKN) Honor Society. Uttamchandani is the Founding Editor of IET Micro & Nano Letters, a journal dedicated to research in micro- and nanoscale science, engineering and technology. He is Associate Editor-in-Chief of IEEE Sensors Letters, a journal dedicated to rapid publication in the field of sensor technologies and sensor networks. Uttamchandani is currently serving as 2024–2025 President of the IEEE Sensors Council.

== Career and Research ==
Uttamchandani began his career as a postdoctoral researcher in optoelectronics at the Department of Electronic and Electrical Engineering, University of Strathclyde where he worked on surface plasmon resonance for optical chemical sensing. His subsequent research in the areas of fiber optic sensors led to the development of nanometric tip (nano-tip) optical fiber chemical sensors for intracellular pH and dissolved oxygen measurements through surface modification of the fiber nano-tips. He has also carried out research in MEMS (micro-electromechanical systems), undertaking measurements of the anisotropic Young’s modulus of single-crystal silicon and its temperature dependence below 273 K. As silicon is widely used in MEMS, these mechanical property measurements are needed for accurate modeling of silicon MEMS devices and sensors for improved performance and reliability.

== Research Assessment and Advocacy ==
Uttamchandani served as a member of the Electrical and Electronic Engineering, Metallurgy and Materials sub-panel for the 2014 Research Excellence Framework exercise in the UK. This UK-wide research assessment evaluated the quality and impact of research undertaken by UK Higher Education Institutions. Uttamchandani was appointed Deputy Convenor of the Electrical and Electronic Engineering Panel for a very similar Research Assessment Exercise in 2020 of Hong Kong’s universities, conducted by the University Grants Committee (Hong Kong). For the forthcoming 2026 Research Assessment Exercise of universities in Hong Kong, he has been appointed as Convenor of the Electrical and Electronic Engineering Panel

Uttamchandani’s talk at the 2024 International Instrumentation and Measurement Technology Conference illustrated how photonics-based instrumentation and measurement technologies are contributing towards meeting all seventeen of the United Nations Sustainable Development Goals. He emphasized the active role of photonics in contributing to sustainable development, which is about meeting current societal needs without compromising the needs of future generations.

== Awards ==
- The IEEE Joseph F. Keithley Award in Instrumentation and Measurement (see entry for 2024) with citation "for contributions to photonics-based optical frequency and wavelength domain instrumentation and measurement"
- The IEEE Sensors Council Technical Achievement Award (see entry for 2017) with citation "for contributions to photonic and fiber-optic sensing systems which have led to significant improvements in healthcare"
