= Peter J. Wild =

Swiss electronics engineer and inventor (born 1939)

Peter J. Wild (German: [ˈvɪlt]; born 1939) is a Swiss electronics engineer and a pioneer of liquid-crystal display (LCD) technology.

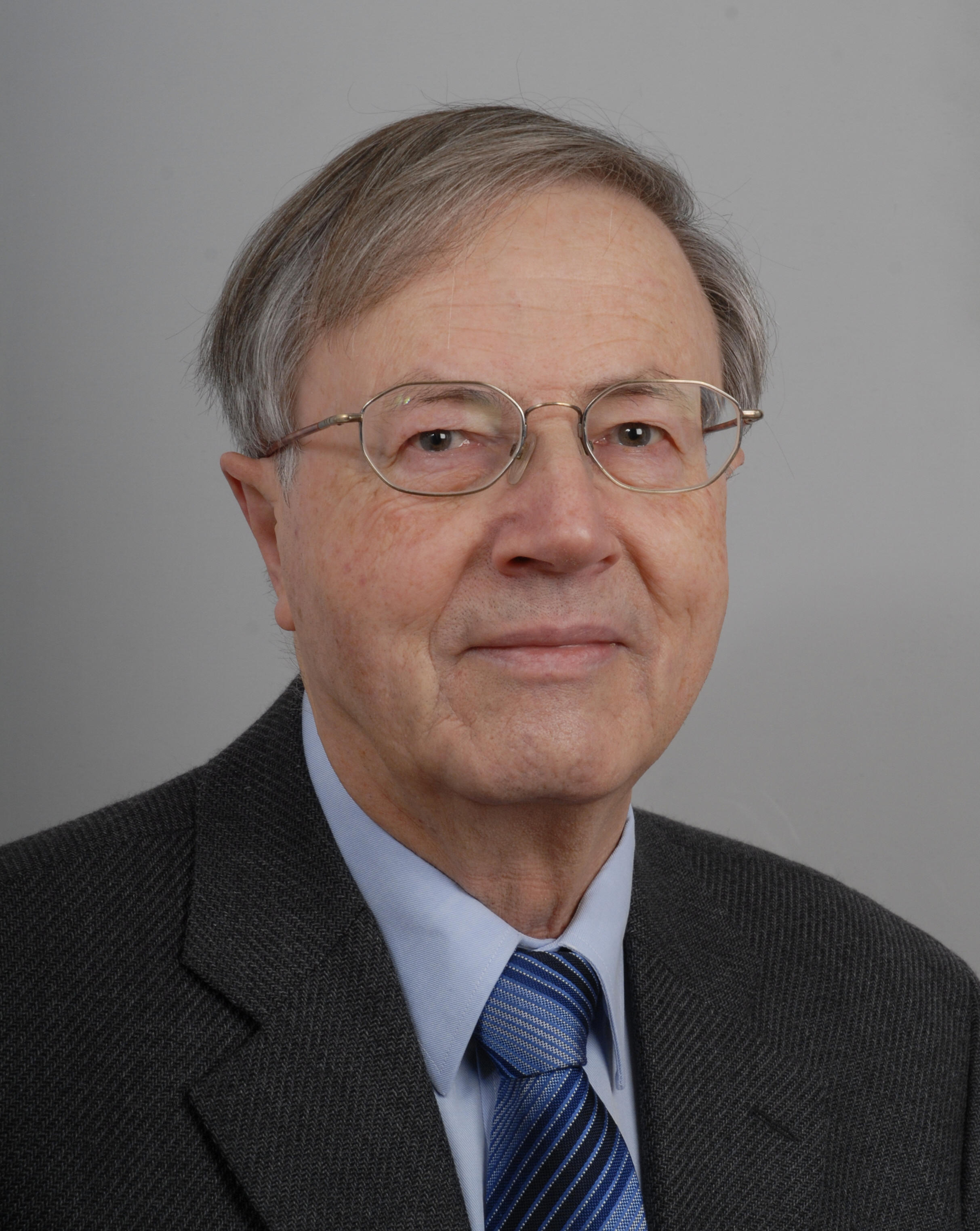
Peter J. Wild, Electronics Engineer (2012)

== Biography ==
Peter Josef Wild was born and educated in St. Gallen, Switzerland. He studied electrical engineering at the Swiss Federal Institute of Technology in Zurich (ETH Zurich) and graduated in 1963.

From 1965 to 1968 he worked in the San Francisco Bay Area, California, as development engineer and obtained a Master of Science degree from the Department of Electrical Engineering and Computer Science at UC Berkeley. After his return to Switzerland in 1969, he joined the new Corporate Research Center of Brown, Boveri & Cie (now ABB) in Baden, Switzerland, developed a phase measurement for an opto-electric current meter on high-voltage lines based on the Faraday effect working with Andre Jaecklin and became the first member of a team developing LCDs from 1970 onwards.

In 1980, he started working in the Swiss telecommunications industry for the rest of his career.

After his professional career, he became a volunteer contributor to Wikipedia for many years.

== Achievements ==
Initially, Wild investigated earlier LCD work done at the RCA Laboratories in the US. Thereafter, Brown Boveri entered into a joint venture with Roche in Basel to explore LCD technologies. As part of this common project, physicists at Roche discovered and patented the Twisted nematic field effect (TN). Also, new room-temperature liquid crystal compounds for the TN effect were developed during this cooperation.

Wild recognized early-on, that matrix-addressing of such displays was important for many potential applications to show images (such as flat-screen computer monitors). Results of his work in this field were published. In particular, Wild discovered, that the RMS voltage of the driving waveforms of LCD matrix displays is relevant for the electrooptic threshold and is not to be exceeded at partially-addressed pixels of passive-matrix displays.

Pioneering work of his team included experiments with LCD projectors as well as illumination schemes for backlit panels resulting in corresponding patents. More than 20 patent applications where filed naming Wild as inventor or co-inventor.

He helped setting up manufacturing of TN LCDs at a new factory in Lenzburg, Switzerland, which started deliveries in 1974, mainly to manufacturers of digital watches, such as Casio of Japan, which used these LCDs to launch its first quartz wristwatches with digital time display under the Casiotron brand.
