= James S. Harris =

American scientist and engineer

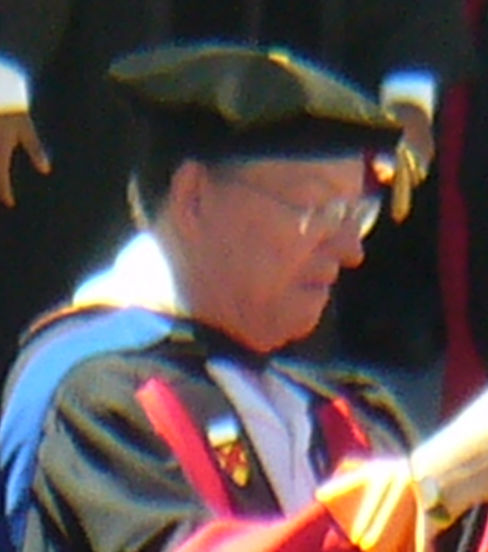
- Education: Stanford University
- Known for: molecular beam epitaxy (MBE), nanofabrication technologies, micromachining, high speed electronic devices, optoelectronics devices, quantum transport and quantum computation
- Awards: 2013 Aristotle Award, Semiconductor Research Corp, 2000 IEEE Third Millennium Medal
- Scientific career
- Fields: Electrical engineering
- Doctoral advisor: Gerald L. Pearson

James S. Harris is a scientist and engineer and fellow of IEEE, American Physical Society and Optical Society of America. His research primarily deals with optoelectronic devices and semiconductor material research.

Since 1982, he is the James and Elenor Chesebrough Professor of Electrical Engineering, Applied Physics and Material Science at Stanford University.

Harris was elected a member of the National Academy of Engineering in 2011 for contributions to epitaxial growth of compound semiconductor materials and their applications.

== Education ==
Harris completed his BS (1964), MS (1965), and PhD (1969) – all in electrical engineering – from Stanford University.

== Career ==
Prior to joining the Stanford department of electrical engineering in 1982, James Harris was with Rockwell International Science Center, where he held various positions from technical staff member to director optoelectronics research.

== Research ==
Harris’ research interests are in the areas of new electronic and optoelectronic device structures created by heterojunctions, quantum wells, superlattices and nanostructured materials. He has carried out research on novel semiconductor materials and their growth at atomic level dimensions for the past 50 years.

Harris has been issued approximately 37 patents as of this publication (2019).

== Awards ==
- 1988 IEEE Fellow
- 1992 American Physical Society Fellow
- 2005 Optical Society of America Fellow
- 2000 IEEE Third Millennium Medal
- 2000 IEEE Morris N. Liebmann Memorial Award
- 2009 Materials Research Society Fellow
- 2011 Member of National Academy of Engineering
- 2013 Aristotle Award, Semiconductor Research Corp
- 2014 Alfred Y. Cho MBE Award, International MBE Conference
- 2023 IEEE Jun-ichi Nishizawa Medal
