= Bonnie Weir =

American electrical engineer

Bonnie E. Weir is a Japanese-born American electrical engineer known for her work on the properties of semiconductors and their reliability against dielectric breakdown. She works for Broadcom.

== Education and career ==
Weir is originally from Osaka, Japan. She majored in physics at Swarthmore College, graduating in 1988. Continuing her studies at the Stevens Institute of Technology, she completed a Ph.D. in physics and engineering physics in 1993.

She worked for AT&T Bell Laboratories, Lucent Technologies, and Agere Systems before taking her present position at Broadcom.

Weir also serves on the board of trustees of Geneva College, a private Christian college in Pennsylvania.

== Recognition ==
Weir was named to the 2026 class of IEEE Fellows, "for contributions to gate dielectric breakdown in semiconductor devices and standards".
