= Gaozhi Xiao =

Gaozhi Xiao is an electrical engineer with the National Research Council Canada in Ottawa, Ontario. He was named a Fellow of the Institute of Electrical and Electronics Engineers (IEEE) in 2015 for his contributions to the development of safety and security monitoring instrumentation and measurement technologies.
