= Mitiko Miura-Mattausch =

Japanese electronics engineer

Mitiko Miura-Mattausch (Japanese: 三浦 道子, born 1949) is a Japanese electronics engineer specializing in the design, modeling, and simulation of electronic components based on semiconductors, including MOSFETs and new models for transistors in LDMOS. She is a professor at Hiroshima University.

== Education and career ==
Miura-Mattausch has a doctorate from Hiroshima University. She was a researcher in Germany at the Max Planck Institute for Solid State Research from 1981 to 1984, and at Siemens from 1984 to 1996. In 1996 she returned to Japan as a professor in the Hiroshima University Faculty of Engineering, taking a special appointment in 2015 with the HiSIM (Hiroshima-University STARC IGFET Model) Research Center.

== Recognition ==
Miura-Mattausch was elected as an IEEE Fellow in 2007, "for contributions to nanoscale metal oxide semiconductor field effect transistor compact modeling".

== Books ==
Miura-Mattausch is the author or editor of:

- Ultra-Fast Silicon Bipolar Technology (edited with Ludwig Treitinger, Springer, 1988)
- The Physics and Modeling of MOSFETs: Surface-Potential Model HiSIM (with Hans Jürgen Mattausch and Tatsuya Ezaki, World Scientific, 2008)

== Awards and honors ==
- 2025 - Person of Cultural Merit
