= Shunri Oda =

Japanese engineer

Shunri Oda from the Tokyo Institute of Technology, Tokyo, Japan was named Fellow of the Institute of Electrical and Electronics Engineers (IEEE) in 2012 for contributions to silicon quantum dot devices.
