= Lina Sarro =

Italian nanoscientist

Pasqualina Maria (Lina) Sarro (born 1957) is an Italian nanoscientist whose research concerns micromachining and other techniques for fabricating silicon and silicon carbide based micro-electromechanical systems. She is a professor of Electronic Components, Technology and Materials, former Antoni van Leeuwenhoek Professor, and former department chair, in the Department of Microelectronics of the Delft University of Technology in The Netherlands.

== Education and career ==
Sarro earned a laurea in physics (the Italian equivalent of a master's degree) at the University of Naples Federico II in 1980. After graduate research at Brown University in the US, she went to the Delft University of Technology for doctoral study in electrical engineering, completing her Ph.D. in 1987.

She continued at Delft as a member of the Delft Institute of Microsystems and Nanoelectronics, and was named Antoni van Leeuwenhoek in 2001. In 2005, she became the first woman on the university's Council of Professors. She chaired the Department of Microelectronics from 2009 to 2016.

== Recognition ==
Sarro was elected as a Eurosensors Fellow in 2004, and elected member of the Royal Netherlands Academy of Arts and Sciences in 2006. She became an IEEE Fellow in 2007, "for contributions to micromachined sensors, actuators, and microsystems". She received the Order of the Netherlands Lion in 2015, and the Order of the Star of Italy in 2016.

Sarro was one of three 1997 recipients of the Rudolf Kingslake Medal and Prize, a best paper award of the journal Optical Engineering. She received the career award of the Italian Association of Sensors and Microsystems (AISEM) in 2007. In 2012 she was the recipient of the IEEE Sensors Council Meritorious Service Award. She was the 2018 recipient of the IEEE Robert Bosch Micro and Nano Electro Mechanical Systems Award, given "for pioneering contributions in novel materials, material integration and innovations in MEMS and strong commitment to education and technology transfer".
