= Andre Jaecklin =

Swiss electrical engineer (born 1933)

Andre A. Jaecklin
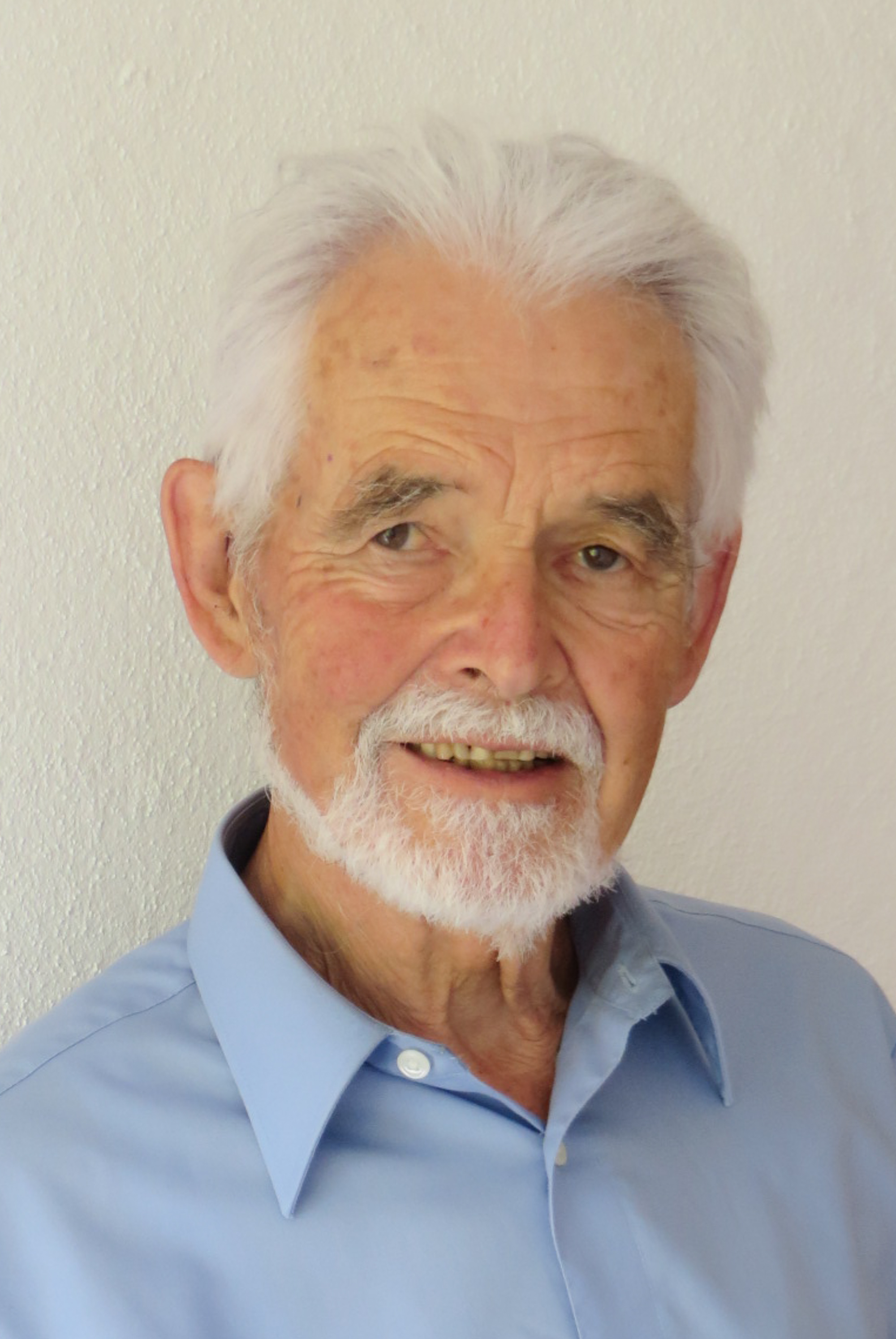
- Jaecklin in 2019
- Born: June 27, 1933 (age 93); Berlin
- Education: ETH Zürich
- Known for: Notable contributions in semiconductor power electronics
- Scientific career
- Fields: Electrical engineering, physics
- Workplaces: Brown, Boveri & Cie
- Doctoral advisor: Heinrich Emil Weber

Andre August Jaecklin (born June 27, 1933) is a Swiss electrical engineer and was a university teacher. He made contributions in different fields of electronics starting with telecommunications, followed by data storage while in California and notably semiconductor devices for power applications. In particular, he is a pioneer of optically fired thyristors in the field of power electronics.

== Life ==
Andre A. Jaecklin graduated in electrical engineering at the Federal Institute of Technology, Zurich (ETH Zurich) in 1958. Subsequently, he spent two years at its Institute of Telecommunications, headed by Heinrich Emil Weber, earning his doctorate degree based on a thesis entitled Transistorisierter Impulsgenerator für die Zeittaktzählung von Telefontaxen. His first employment in industry was at G. Hasler Ltd. in Berne, Switzerland. In 1963, he emigrated to the US and worked for Ampex Corporation in Redwood City in the field of magnetic-tape data storage devices. When he returned to Switzerland in 1968, he joined the newly founded Corporate Research Center of Brown, Boveri & Cie in Baden AG. His first assignment was the development of a photoelectric current sensor for high-voltage transmission lines using the Faraday effect together with Peter J. Wild.

In 1970, he started and led a new research group Semiconductor Devices. The efforts were directed towards applications in AC/DC converters for high-voltage DC power transmission. Within the company, he changed from the Research Center to the Electronics Division in 1973. There, he contributed to the development of corresponding products. His activity concentrated on the conception and realization of new bipolar devices such as very high power thyristors and Gate turn-off thyristors (GTOs) to be used in DC transmission lines and electrical locomotives.

From 1981 onwards, he lectured power electronics at the ETH Zurich. In April 1993, this university made him adjunct professor at the Department of Information Technology and Electrical Engineering.

== Honors ==
- IEEE Fellow since 1995
- Prof. André Jaecklin introduced into the ISPSD / IEEE Hall of Fame. D-ITET, ETH Zurich, 29 May 2018

== Publications ==
- A. A. Jaecklin, M. Lietz: Birefringence and Faraday Effect. J. of Appl. Math. and Phys. 20 (4), 1969, p. 565
- André A. Jaecklin (Editor): Power Semiconductor Devices and Circuits. Springer, New York. 26 October 2012, ISBN 978-0-306-44402-9.
- André A. Jaecklin: Publications by Andre A. Jaecklin. Researchgate. Retrieved 28 May 2019
- Wolfgang Fichtner and André A. Jaecklin: ISPSD Proceedings International Symposium on Power Semiconductor Devices & ICs. IEEE, 1 December 1994, 436 pp. ISBN 978-0-7803-1494-8
- André A. Jaecklin (Keynote Paper): Integration of Power Components – State of the Art and Trends. 7th European Conference on Power Electronics and Applications. Trondheim, Norway. EPE Association, Brussels, September 1997.
