= Unil Perera =

Physicist

A. G. Unil Perera is a Sri Lanka-born American physicist with an assortment of research interests in experimental condensed matter physics, especially semiconductor infrared detectors and applications. He has authored over 200 publications covering a variety of disciplines. He is a Regents’ Professor of Physics at Georgia State University, in Atlanta, Georgia.

After his basic education in Sri Lanka, he obtained his doctoral degree in (applied) physics from the University of Pittsburgh under the supervision of Darry D. Coon. During his graduate research, he developed a detector, which can detect infrared (IR) radiation without the use of any amplifiers. (Solid State Electronics, 29, 929, (1986). Then he introduced the concept of a two-terminal artificial (semiconductor) neuron (International Journal of Electronics, 63, 61, (1987), a parallel asynchronous processing based on artificial neurons (Int journal of Infrared and Millimeter Waves, 9, 1037, 1987), Neural Networks 2, 143, (1989).( Phys. Rev. Lett., 58, 1139, (1987, Neural Information Processing Systems", 201–210, Edited by Dana Z. Anderson, A. I. P., New York, (1988)).

== Early life and education ==
Unil Perera was born in Sri Lanka to Mr. A. G. Weyman Perera and Mrs. Daya Perera. He had his pre-college education at Ananda College of Colombo, the premier Buddhist School in Sri Lanka founded by the Theosophical Society headed by the US visionary Henry Steel Olcott. He obtained a BSc in physics (First Class Honors) in 1981 from the University of Colombo, Sri Lanka. After serving as an assistant lecturer for one year, he came to University of Pittsburgh and obtained a PhD degree in experimental solid state physics in 1987. After a brief postdoctoral position at the University of Pittsburgh, he was appointed as a research assistant professor in January 1988. In 1992, he accepted an assistant professor position at Georgia State University. He has held visiting research positions at the Institute for Microstructural Studies, National Research Council, Ottawa, Canada, National Institute of Fundamental Studies, Sri Lanka, and Technical University, Singapore.

== Recognition ==
Perera was elected a Fellow of the American Physical Society (APS) in 2005 and as a Fellow of the Society of Photo Instrumentation Engineers (SPIE) of the Institute Electrical and Electronics Engineers (IEEE) in 2012. He was recognized as the IEEE Photonics Society distinguished lecturer award in 2020.

He became a full professor at GSU in 2001. In 2009, College of Arts and Sciences at GSU awarded him “Outstanding Faculty Scholarship Award”, followed by the “Alumni Distinguished Professor” Award from GSU and the “Carl R Nave Award for the Outstanding Educator in Physics” from the Society of Physics Students, both in 2010. In 2013 GSU awarded him the title Regents’ Professor of Physics.

In 2012, Sri Lanka Foundation, a non-profit organization with a mission to educate the citizens of the world on Sri Lanka and the achievements of its people, gave Perera their highest award ”Lifetime Achievement Award”. He was instrumental in establishing joint tri partite research programs with the National Institute of Fundamental Science, Sri Lanka (NIFS) and IIT Chennai and GSU. He also established a joint PhD program with NIFS, where NIFS junior researchers can obtain a PhD at GSU.

He also organized and chaired an international conference on Infrared detectors in Sri Lanka. He as a member of the APS international Affairs committee, organized webinars on “Graduate Studies in US” for the Southeast Asian audiences.

== Research ==
- Homojunction Interfacial work function internal photoemission IR Detectors (HIWIP): Rather than using specific semiconductors for specific wavelength range detection, he developed detectors which can detect IR radiation over a wide range irrespective of the semiconductor material. The idea is based on metal–insulator transitions, where a semiconductor material will behave as a metal under high doping. This will develop an interfacial workfunction (energy gap) at an interface between a highly doped and intrinsic semiconductor junction. The energy gap can be controlled by the doping, leading to a wavelength tailorable detector. (APL, 60 (25) 3168-3170 (1992), JAP 77 (2) 915-924 (1995), APL 66, 2262–2264 (1995) He used commercially available PIN diodes, (Silicon, Ge and InGaAs) to demonstrate a far infrared concept which can be used with any semiconductor material system. [App. Phys. Lett., 55, 1738, (1989), Appl. Phys. Lett., 60, 3168, (1992), Superlattice and Microstructures 14, 123–128 (1993). LASER FOCUS WORLD, NEWSBREAKS, featured this work in their August 1992 issue. Based on these ideas a wavelength tunable infrared detector patent was awarded. [U.S. Patent # 5,030,831, issued on July 9, 1991.] A complete model to explain the wavelength tunable homojunction interfacial workfunction internal photoemission (HIWIP) detector concepts was developed. [J. Appl. Phys, 77, 915–924, (1995), Appl. Phys. Lett. 66, 2262–2264, (1995)] This idea was successfully tested in MBE grown GaAs and SI HIWIP FIR detectors. JAP 81(7) 3316–3319, 1997, APL 72(18) 2307-2309 (1998).
- Quantum well infrared photodetector (QWIP): Perera demonstrated that the quantum well detectors can be developed to detect LWIR (long-wavelength infrared) and VLWIR detectors by continuously extending the threshold to:

(a) A 14.5 micron threshold quantum well infrared detector demonstrated in 1990.[ Appl. Phys. Lett., 60, 3022, (1992).]

(b) Designed and successfully demonstrated a 28-micron threshold QWIP in 1998 [Appl. Phys. Lett. 72, 1596–1598, (1998)]

(c) Extended the threshold wavelength to 32 micron in 2000. [Appl. Phys. Lett, 77 741–743, (2000)]

The November 2000 issue of PHOTONICS SPECTRA, TECHNOLOGY WORLD BRIEFS featured this work. In each case it was the longest threshold detected in QWIPs at the time. He reported non-monotonic dependence of the polarization extinction ratio on the parameters of the diffraction grid in QWIP detectors in 2010. (IEEE J of Quantum Electronics 46, 6, 877, (2010). Two back-to-back connected p-i-n photodiodes with InGaAs/GaAs and GaAs/AlGaAs-based quantum wells integrated within the n-regions was designed to detect five bands covering visible to long-wave infrared was demonstrated using a GaAs-based n-p-n-architecture. {APL, 97, 231102 (2010) }

- Heterojunction Interfacial work function internal photoemission IR Detectors (HEIWIP) The hole–hole transitions limited the Homojunction (HIWIP) detector tailorability and also the high doping contributed to the dark current. This led to his development of Heterojunction (HEIWIP) detectors combining the free carrier from HIWIP and the adjustable barrier ideas from Molecular-beam epitaxy (MBE) growth and Quantum Well infrared detectors. [APL 78, 2241–2243 (2001) Dark current wavelength tailorability and bias tunability was demonstrated using different Al fractions in the AlGaAs barriers. [Solid State Electronics 45, 87–93, (2001), APL 82 (1) 139-141 (2003), JAP 93 (4) 1879-1883 (2003), JAP 96 (8) 4588-4597 (2004), IEEE transactions of Electron Devices, 44, 2180–2186, (1997), Appl. Phys. Lett., 71, 2677–2679, (1997)].
- Quantum dot and Ring IR detectors (QDIP): Multicolor QDIP detectors were demonstrated. The effect of well width on the dot in a well structure was studied. [Applied Physics Letters, 83, 2745–2747 (2003), Photonics Tech. Letts, 17, 1064–1066, (2005), Photonics Tech. Letts, 17, 178–180, (2005)] The three color QDIP results were reported in the December 2003 issue of LASER FOCUS WORLD, NEWSBREAKS. Room temperature operation of a QDIP was demonstrated. [Appl. Phys. Lett, 86, 191106, (2005), IEEE Journal of Quantum Electronics, 41(7), 974–979, (2005)]. These ideas were extended to detect multiband detection into the terahertz range. (APL 89, 031117, (2006), APL 92, 011117, (2008)). Quantum rings obtained by annealing the dot structures were demonstrated to detect terahertz radiation. To understand the performance, the effect of the dot size and distribution on the intersublevel transmission and absorption coefficients of III-V systems was calculated.
- Multiband Junction Detectors: A dual band (NIR and FIR) homojunction detector was demonstrated. [Appl. Phys. Lett, 86, 143510, (2005) & APL 89, 061112,(2006)] The idea was extended to UV – IR dual band heterojunction detectors, {APL 89, 091113 (2006) APL 89,061112 (2006)}. A US patent was issued No. 7838869 on Nov. 23, 2010 for this Dual Band detector. PHOTONICS SPECTRA, TECHNOLOGY NEWS issue of June 2005 reported this as their featured article. In order to detect UV and IR simultaneously and separately, a three terminal device was developed (Optics Letters, Vol 33, 21, 2422–2424, 2008) and a patent was issued on 10/27/2011.
- Split off Band IR detectors: A GaAs based Split-Off (S-O) band detector responding in 2–4 μm at ambient temperature was demonstrated to work at room temperature. (APL 93, 021105 (2008). A model calculating the dark and illuminated currents from the photoabsorption, carrier escape and transport, explaining the experimental response was developed. (JAP 106, 1064503 (2009) Hole transitions from the heavy-hole (hh) to the light-hole (lh) band contributing to the 4–10 μm response range were demonstrated on p-GaAs/AlGaAs detectors. The detectors show a spectral response up to 16.5 μm, operating up to a temperature of 330 K where the lh-hh response is superimposed on the free-carrier response. (APL 97, 091104 (2010)) In contrast to conventional 1-D current models due to carrier transport based on tunnelling and/or thermionic emission mechanisms, a 2-D electrical model explained non uniformity degradation of zero-bias differential resistance (R0A) with temperatures as measured on SO detectors. This 2-D characteristic of carrier transport could have limitations on high-temperature performances of detectors. Modifications such as using smaller mesa sizes, higher doping of the p+-GaAs layer, and a higher potential barrier that prospectively provides better electrical uniformity shows the possibility of working at high temperatures. (IEEE Transactions on Electron Devices Vol 57, No 6, 2010). By employing a non-symmetrical band alignment a long-wavelength photovoltaic response (up to 8 lm) in a short-wavelength p-type GaAs heterojunction detector (with the activation energy of EA 0:40 eV), operating at 80 K was demonstrated. (APL 104, 131101 (2014). He demonstrated a new, long-wavelength photodetection principle based on a hot–cold hole energy transfer mechanism that overcomes the standard cutoff wavelength limit λ_{c} that is related to the activation energy (or bandgap) of the semiconductor structure (or material) (Δ) through the relationship λ_{c} = hc/Δ. Using this he demonstrated a very long-wavelength infrared response up to 55 μm, which is tunable by varying the degree of hot-hole injection, for a GaAs/AlGaAs sample with Δ = 0.32 eV (equivalent to 3.9 μm in wavelength). ( Nature Photonics 8, 412–418, (2014).
- Physics of Internal Photemission: The temperature-dependent characteristic of band offsets at the heterojunction interface was studied by an internal photoemission (IPE) method. In contrast to the traditional Fowler method independent of the temperature (T), this method takes into account carrier thermalization and carrier/dopant-induced band-renormalization and band-tailing effects, and thus measures the band-offset parameter at different temperatures. Re-examining a p-type doped GaAs emitter/undoped AlxGa1−xAs barrier heterojunction system disclosed its previously ignored T dependency in the valence band offset, with a variation up to ~−10−4 eV/K in order to accommodate the difference in the T -dependent band gaps between GaAs and AlGaAs. Through determining the Fermi energy level (Ef), IPE is able to distinguish the impurity (IB) and valence bands (VB) of extrinsic semiconductors. One important example is to determine Ef of dilute magnetic semiconductors such as GaMnAs, and to understand whether it is in the IB or VB. (PRB 86 195315 (2012)) He also employed IPE spectroscopy to directly measure the valence-band Van Hove singularity, and identify phonons participating in indirect intervalence-band optical transitions. Photoemission of holes photoexcited through transitions between valence bands displays a clear and resolvable threshold, unlike previous reports of interband critical points, which become obscure in doped materials. It demonstrated the enhancement of optical phonon-assisted features primarily contributing to the photoemission yield. (PRB 88, 201302 (2013). He also reported the non-commutativity of band offset for GaAs/AlGaAs, i.e., the dependence on the order of the growth of the layers by probing a slightly higher (5–10 meV) valence-band offset at the GaAs-on-Al_{0.57}Ga_{0.43}As interface compared to that of the Al_{0.57}Ga_{0.43}As-on-GaAs interface, by using internal photoemission spectroscopy. IPE Spectroscopy was also applied to other materials such as HgCdTE (APL 104, 131106 (2014), type-II InAs/GaSb superlattice (T2SL) pBp photodetector (APL 103, 181110 (2013), GaAs and GaMnAs, GaAsSb, InGaAs (JAP 119, 105304 (2016)
- Minimally invasive disease diagnostics: Activation of Jurkat T-cells in culture following treatment with anti-CD3 (cluster of differentiation 3) antibody was detected within 75 min after the cells encountered specific Immunoglobulin molecules by interrogating the treated T-cells using the Attenuated Total Reflection–Fourier Transform Infrared (ATR-FTIR) spectroscopy technique. (APL 104, 243705 (2014). It was demonstrated as an effective tool to detect colitis in mice blood serum. (J. Biophotonics 10, 465 (2017)) The same technique was extended to demonstrate the identification of biochemical changes induced by Non-Hodgkin lymphoma and subcutaneous melanoma using EL4 mouse model of non-Hodgkin lymphoma and a B16 mouse model of subcutaneous melanoma. (Nature Series Scientific Reports 7, 16993, 2013)
