= Lois Walsh =

American researcher

Lois Diane Harper Walsh is a retired researcher for the Air Force Research Laboratory (AFRL). Originally a materials scientist, she became branch chief for advanced computing at the AFRL Rome Laboratory.

Walsh earned a master's degree from Syracuse University in 1984, with the master's thesis Microstructural Characterization of Copper Films Deposited in Titanium Substrates. By the time she completed her Ph.D. in solid state science at Syracuse in 1989, she was already working at the Rome laboratory (then known as the Rome Air Development Center), and married with two children. Her dissertation, The Interaction of Polycrystalline Copper Films with Dilute Aqueous Solutions of Cupric Chloride, was supervised by James A. Schwarz, a Syracuse professor of chemical engineering and materials science.

In 2005, Walsh was named an IEEE Fellow "for leadership in electronic device reliability". At this point she was branch chief for advanced computing at the Rome Laboratory, in charge of a team of 30 staff researchers, and had fostered collaborations between them and "numerous extramural researchers and university faculty". Her work involved not only device reliability, based on "innovative surface analysis and diagnostic techniques", but also high performance computing, quantum computing, and biologically inspired nanotechnology.
