= Edward W. Yu =

Edward W. Yu is an American crystallographer.

After completing his doctoral degree at the University of Michigan in 1997, Yu became a postdoctoral researcher with the National Institutes of Health, then subsequently joined the faculty of Iowa State University in 2004. He is also associated with the Ames National Laboratory. ISU's Department of Chemistry named Yu to the John D. Corbett Professorship in 2014. That year, he was also elected a fellow of the American Association for the Advancement of Science. In 2016, the American Physical Society elected Yu to fellowship, "[f]or his distinguished contributions to the field of efflux transporters, which mediate resistance to a variety of antimicrobials in bacteria, and his research into the crystallography of integral membrane proteins."
