= Thomas Edward Linnenbrink =

American electrical engineer

Thomas Edward Linnenbrink is an American electrical engineer with the Hittite Microwave Corporation of Colorado Springs, Colorado. He was named a Fellow of the Institute of Electrical and Electronics Engineers (IEEE) in 2012 for his work in standards for instrumentation and measurement systems.
