= Kei May Lau =

Hong Kong semiconductor engineer

Kei May Lau (Chinese: 劉紀美) is a semiconductor engineer whose research topics have included high-electron-mobility transistors, light-emitting diodes, and laser diodes. She is Fang Professor of Engineering and Director of the Photonics Technology Center in the Hong Kong University of Science and Technology Department of Electronic & Computer Engineering.

== Education and career ==
Lau is originally from Hong Kong, but came to the US for her undergraduate and graduate education, earning bachelor's and master's degrees in physics at the University of Minnesota in 1976 and 1977, respectively, and completing a Ph.D. in electrical engineering at Rice University in 1981.

After briefly working in industry, she became a faculty member at the University of Massachusetts Amherst in 1982, and was promoted to full professor there in 1993. She visited Hong Kong University of Science and Technology in 1998 and moved there permanently as a chair professor of engineering in 2000. She was given the Fang Professorship in Engineering in 2016.

== Recognition ==
Lau was named a Fellow of the IEEE in 2001, "for contributions to III-V compound semiconductor heterostructure materials and devices". She was elected to the Hong Kong Academy of Engineering Sciences in 2016, and is also an OSA Fellow. In 2020, she received the Nick Holonyak Jr. Award, "For significant contributions to hetero-epitaxy of compound semiconductors on silicon for future integrated lasers and advancing the field of light-emitting diode microdisplays."
