= Aristos Christou =

American engineer

Aristos (Aristotelis) Christou
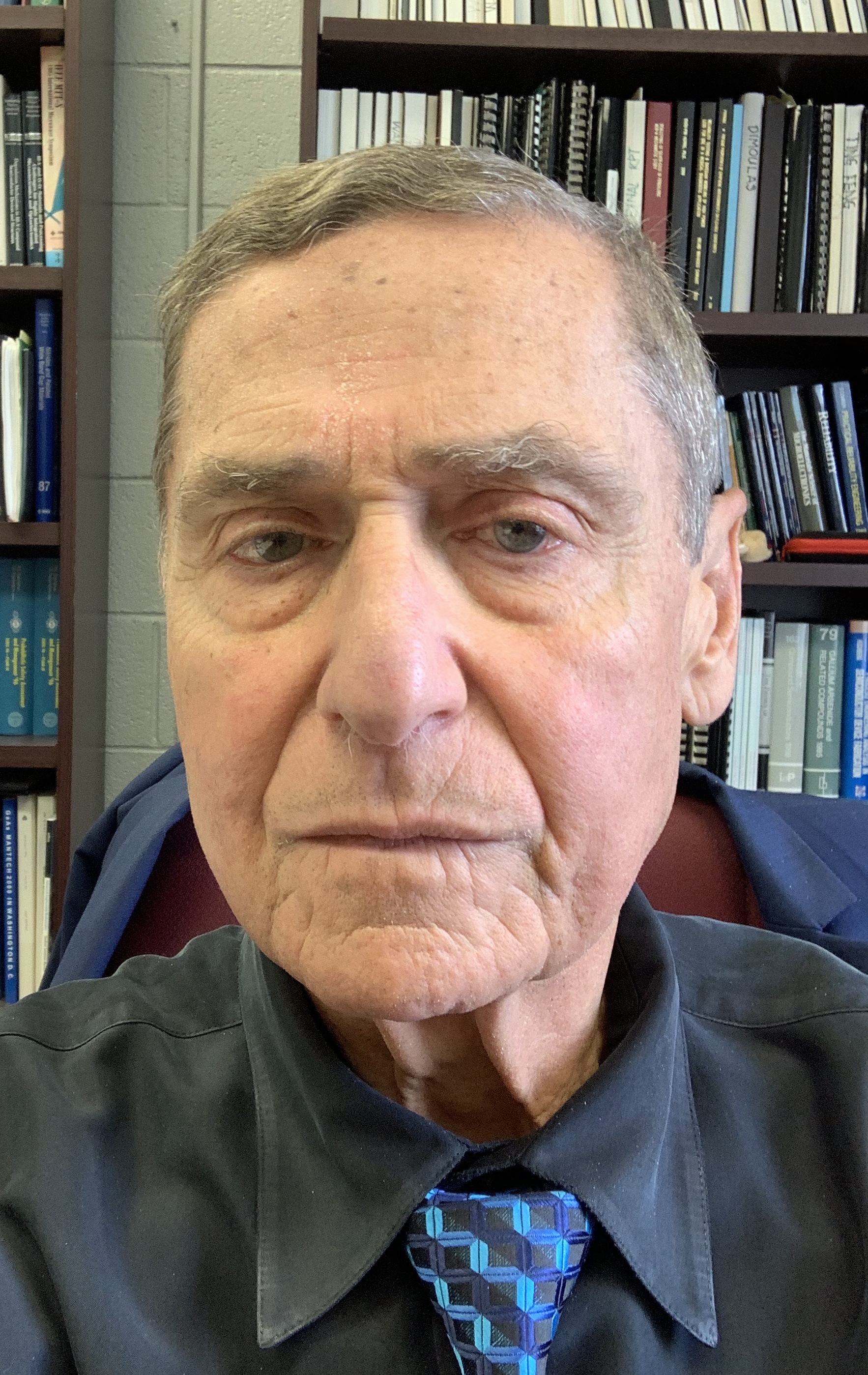
- Occupations: Professor, Academic and Research Scientist
- Awards: UNESCO Award for Scientific Excellence; Navy Patent Awards for Electron Device Inventions iNEER Lifetime Achievement Award for Achievement on International Engineering Education and Research; ASM Burgess Award; Centennial Medal, University of Bolognia

Academic background
- Education: B.A., Physics; Ph.D., Materials Science
- Alma mater: Columbia University; University of Pennsylvania

Aristos Christou is an American engineer and scientist, academic professor and researcher. He is a professor of Materials Science, Professor of Mechanical Engineering and Professor of Reliability Engineering at the University of Maryland.

Christou has conducted research in basic device physics, solid state electronics, semiconductor materials, radiation effects in microelectronics, radiation hard design methodologies, basic processes of materials degradation, along with degradation of metal microstructure and high pressure induced transformations in steels and iron alloys. His technical contributions include the development of material's surface and interface science and methodologies for achieving reliable high frequency devices, optoelectronic devices and circuits.

Christou is a life fellow of Institute of Electrical and Electronics Engineers. He has been the Editor of Materials Science and Engineering, and of Reliability and Quality International and previous co-editor of the IEEE Transactions of Devices Materials and Reliability.

== Education ==
Christou received his bachelor's degree in physics from Columbia University 1967 and received his Doctoral degree in Material Science from the University of Pennsylvania in 1971.

== Career ==
Christou worked at Naval Research Laboratory as a Researcher from 1971 until 1976, as a Section Head until 1985 and as a Branch Head of Surface Physics until 1989. He then taught briefly at Rutgers University and the University of Crete before joining the University of Maryland in 1990 as a professor of Mechanical Engineering. He became a professor of Materials Engineering in 1993 as well as Professor of Reliability Engineering.

At the University of Maryland, Christou chaired the Department of Materials and Nuclear Engineering (1993–2003) and the Materials Science and Engineering Department in 2003.

Christou directed the NSF University-Industry Cooperative Research Center in Optoelectronic Devices Interconnects and Packaging (COEDIP) from 2002 until 2005. In 1989, Christou established the Microelectronics Research Group (MRG) at the University of Crete and the Foundation for Research and Technology-Hellas (FORTH).

== Research ==
Christou began his career by investigating shock induced transformations in binary iron alloys and steels and was the first to report on the retention of shock induced phases in Fe-Mn based alloys. His later research is focused on compound semiconductor materials, nitride semiconductors and the process science for such materials, radiation effects in materials and devices, manufacturing science of microwave and millimeter wave electronics, and reliability science of high frequency devices.

=== Device physics and modeling ===
Christou is known for his research on the transistor back-gating phenomenon, hot electron injection, light-induced sensitivity of HEMTs and 2D conducting channel structures in wide bandgap electronics. Christou, using delta doping techniques he developed for GaAs/AlGaAs HEMTs, extended the use of delta doping to ultra- wide bandgap semiconductors and developed the p-Diamond HEMT. He pioneered the development of optical interconnects based on GaAs/Si and InGaAs/Si using molecular beam epitaxy and developed the modeling tools for the optical interconnect design. Christou demonstrated that III-V semiconductors can be grown directly on silicon through interface control, thereby limiting the density of threading dislocations.

Christou designed and demonstrated the selectively oxidized Vertical Cavity Surface Emitting Laser (VCSEL) for operation at a wavelength of 1.546 μm and determined performance limitations due to the effects of Bragg mirror interface grading and layer thickness variations. He also developed computational simulations to identify the key sensitivities to VCSEL performance.

=== Physics of failure in electronic materials ===
Christou studied metal-semiconductor inter-diffusion and electro-migration and developed the Failure Physics approach to the design and manufacture compound semiconductor devices and circuits. His research identified failure modes which were validated by the application of advanced characterization techniques such as Auger electron spectroscopy, and the high resolution SEM.

In the 1990s, Christou authored papers and one book on GaAs MMIC Reliability, which introduced new failure mechanism models for electromigration and highlighted a practical model for electromigration and its relationship to microstructure. He also presented procedures for avoiding solid-state electromigration failure.

Later in his career, Christou's research resulted in the development of a model for OLED based flexible display degradation based on the ingress of moisture through the protective barrier films. Christou's research on flexible displays starting in 2010 resulted in the solution of the fatigue degradation problem and the elimination of line-out defects which plagued the flexible display industry. He was the first to publish S-N fatigue curves for graphene and Indium Tin Oxide interconnects.

=== Processing technology research ===
Christou pioneered UV laser processing of GaAs MBE buffer layers through a technique known as LAMBE (Laser Assisted Molecular Beam Epitaxy). This new laser assisted MBE growth technology enabled low temperature growth to be realized for GaAs buffer layers as well as GaAs epitaxial layers. He conducted research on tunable photonic bandgap devices based on multiple layer perovskite heterostructures that are grown by pulsed laser deposition (PLD) on (001) MgO/GaAs substrates. Christou showed that such superlattices are feasible especially for nonlinear photonic applications. His work resulted in optical modulation at primary and first harmonic frequencies, and provided direct evidence of the non-linear electro-optic effect in such materials

=== Reliable nitride semiconductors ===
Christou's contributions to the field of reliable nitride semiconductors and wide bandgap semiconductors led to enhanced and reliable power electronics performance. His contributions also included vertical high electron mobility transistors based on nitride semiconductors utilizing the AlGaN/GaN heterojunctions and high k dielectrics for high voltage transistors. He investigated the key reliability problem relating to the conduction channel breakdown due to high electric fields and related the breakdown mechanism to substrate dislocations. Christou proposed a solution to the reliability problem through the control of traps for electrons and through dislocation density reduction. He applied deep-level transient spectroscopy and investigated the formation of trap centers, as well as the application of x-ray topography to determine the morphology of dislocation clusters.

== Awards and honors ==
- 1974 – NRL Alan Berman Publication Award
- 1978–1983 – Navy Outstanding Service Awards for contributions to solid state electronics, phased array radar and for contributions to reliable microelectronics materials
- 1981 – UNESCO Award for Scientific Excellence and Contributions for Scientific Assistance
- 1985–1986 – Fulbright Scholar Award
- 1987 – Centennial Medal for Contributions in Compound Semiconductors, University of Bologna
- 1991 – Navy Patent Award for Electron Device Inventions
- 1993 – Fellow, IEEE
- 1999 – Invention of the Year Award in the Physical Sciences, University of Maryland
- 1999–2002 – IEEE National Lecturer in Electron Devices
- 2000 – IEEE National Lecturer in Optoelectronic Devices and Device and Materials Reliability Physics
- 2001–2012 – IEEE Electron Devices Society Recognition and Contributions Service Award
- 2004 – iNEER Lifetime Achievement Award for Achievement on International Engineering Education and Research
- 2007 – Burgess Memorial Award for Seminal Contributions to Electronic Materials, Packaging and Devices, ASM
- 2012 – Micro & Nano Scientific Society Award of the MNE Annual Conference, Heraklio Crete.

== Bibliography ==
=== Selected books ===
- Integrating Reliability into Microcircuit Manufacturing (1994) ISBN 978-0471944072
- Electromigration and Electronic Device Degradation (1994) ISBN 978-0471584896
- Reliability of Gallium Arsenide Monolithic Microwave Integrated Circuits (1995) ISBN 978-0471961611
- Reliability of High Temperature Electronics (1996) ISBN 978-0965266949
- Photonic Materials, Devices and Reliability (2006) ISBN 978-1933904047

=== Selected articles ===
- A. Christou, "Solid Phase Formation in AuGeNi and AuGeIn-GaAs Ohmic Contact Systems", Solid State Electronics 22, 141, pp. 149–157 (1979).
- A. Georgakilas, P. Panayotatos, J. Stoemenos, J.L. Mourrain and A. Christou, "Achievements and Limitations in Optimized GaAs Films Grown on Si by Molecular Beam Epitaxy", Journal of Applied Physics, Vol. 71, No. 6, pp. 2679–2701 (March 1992).
- N. Papanicolaou, A. Christou and M. Gipe, "Pt and PtSi Schottky Contacts on n-type B-SiC", Journal of Applied Physics 65 (9), pp. 3526–3530 (1989).
- S. Yang, A.Christou, "Failure Model for Silver Electromigration" IEEE Trans Materials Device Reliability, Vol2, Feb 2007.
- S. Yang, J.Wu, A. Christou, "Initial Stages of Silver Electrochemical Migration Degradation," Microelectronics Reliability vol.46 (2006) 1915–1921.
