= Keh-Yung Cheng =

Taiwanese electrical engineer and semiconductor materials scientist

- 鄭克勇
- Citizenship: Republic of China (Taiwan)
- Education: B.S. Electrical Engineering – Chung Cheng Institute of Technology (1969); M.S. Electrical Engineering – Stanford University (1972); Ph.D. Electrical Engineering – Stanford University (1975)
- Known for: Molecular beam epitaxy research; III–V compound semiconductors; High-speed electronic and optoelectronic devices
- Awards: IEEE Fellow; AAAS Fellow; MBE Innovator Award (2007); 2011 Pan Wen Yuan Prize
- Scientific career
- Fields: Semiconductor materials, Optoelectronics, Molecular Beam Epitaxy
- Workplaces: Chung Cheng Institute of Technology ( now CCIT, NDU ); Bell Laboratories; University of Illinois Urbana-Champaign ( UIUC ); National Tsing Hua University ( NTHU )

Keh-Yung Cheng is a Taiwanese electrical engineer and semiconductor materials scientist known for his work on III–V compound semiconductors and molecular beam epitaxy (MBE). He served as a professor at the University of Illinois Urbana-Champaign and later returned to Taiwan to serve at National Tsing Hua University.

== Early life and education ==
Cheng received his Bachelor of Science in Electrical Engineering from the Chung Cheng Institute of Technology ( now NDU IST ) in Taiwan in 1969.

He later pursued graduate studies at Stanford University, receiving:

- M.S. in Electrical Engineering (1972)
- Ph.D. in Electrical Engineering (1975)

== Academic and research career ==
After completing his doctoral studies, Cheng returned to Taiwan and taught at the Chung Cheng Institute of Technology from 1975 to 1979.

He later joined Bell Laboratories, where he worked with semiconductor pioneer Alfred Y. Cho on molecular beam epitaxy and compound semiconductor materials. During this period he contributed to: rotating substrate holder designs for MBE systems, improved mobility in InP-based heterostructures, development of GaInAs/AlInAs/InP high electron mobility transistors (HEMTs).

In 1987 Cheng joined the faculty of the University of Illinois Urbana-Champaign, where he conducted research on III–V semiconductor materials, nanostructures, and optoelectronic devices.

He directed several major research programs including: Broadband Optical Switching Systems Center (BOSS Center), Center for Heterostructure Materials and Devices (HUNT Center).

After retiring from UIUC, Cheng returned to Taiwan and served as Dean of the College of Electrical Engineering and Computer Science at the National Tsing Hua University.

== Scientific contributions ==
Cheng's research focuses on epitaxial growth and device physics of III–V compound semiconductors. He has published more than 200 scientific papers in semiconductor physics and optoelectronics.

His work contributed to: development of molecular beam epitaxy techniques, heterostructure semiconductor materials, and high-speed electronic and photonic devices.

== Honors and awards ==
- Fellow, Institute of Electrical and Electronics Engineers (2002)
- Fellow, American Association for the Advancement of Science (2003)
- MBE Innovator Award (2007)
