= Takatomo Enoki =

Japanese engineer

Takatomo Enoki from the Nippon Telegraph and Telephone Corporation, NTT, Atsugi-shi, Kanagawa, Japan was named Fellow of the Institute of Electrical and Electronics Engineers (IEEE) in 2013 for contributions to compound semiconductor high speed integrated circuits for optical and wireless communication systems.
