= Leda Lunardi =

Brazilian-American electronics engineer

Leda Maria Lunardi is a Brazilian-American electrical engineer whose research concerns electronics, photonics, and optoelectronics. She is a professor of electrical and computer engineering at North Carolina State University.

== Education and career ==
Lunardi is from a large Brazilian family, part of the first generation of her family to go to college. She followed a pre-medical track in high school, but after developing an aversion to the internals of human bodies, changed her focus, switching to physics on the advice of a teacher. She studied physics at the University of São Paulo, earning a bachelor's degree in 1976 and a master's degree in 1979. She completed a Ph.D. in electrical engineering at Cornell University in 1985.

She joined AT&T Bell Labs in 1986, and worked for AT&T until moving to JDS Uniphase in 1999. In 2003, she returned to academia as a professor at North Carolina State University. From 2005 to 2007 she served as a program director for Electrical, Cyber and Communication Systems at the National Science Foundation.

== Book ==
With Alice C. Parker, Lunardi is co-editor of the book Women in Microelectronics (Springer, 2020), with chapters written by researchers in this area detailing their lives and research.

== Recognition ==
Lunardi won the Achievement Award of the IEEE Lasers and Electro-Optics Society in 2000. She was named a Fellow of the IEEE in 2002, "for contributions to the development of high-performance 1.55 um monolithically integrated photoreceiver for optical communication".
