= Keithley Instruments =

American measurement company

Keithley Instruments, LLC
- Company type: Division
- Industry: Electronic Test Equipment
- Founded: Cleveland, Ohio (1946)
- Area served: Worldwide
- Key people: Joseph F. Keithley, Founder
- Owner: Tektronix (100%)
- Parent: Raliant Corporation
- Website: https://www.tek.com/en/products/keithley

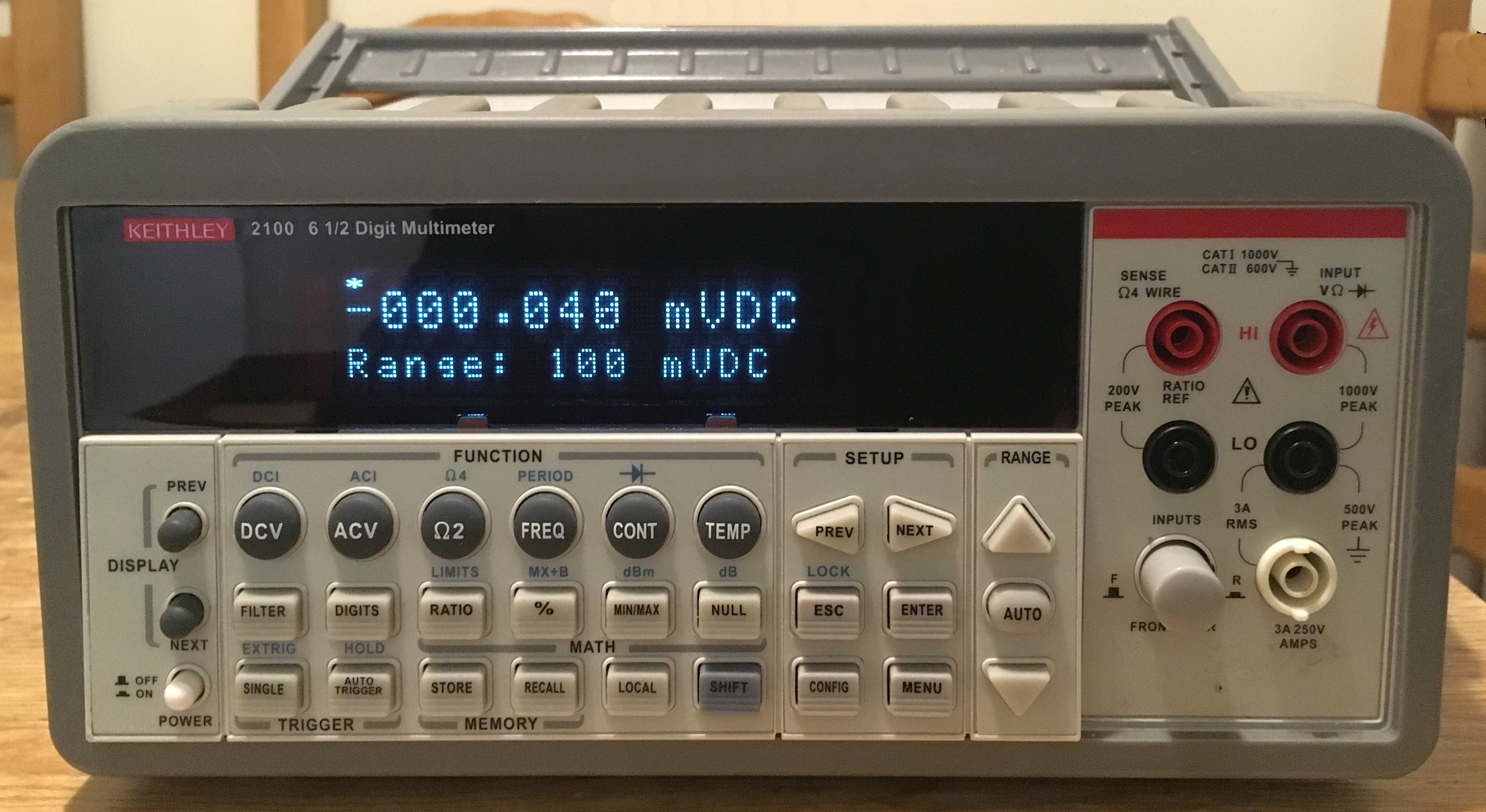
Keithley Instruments bench-top digital multimeter

Keithley Instruments is a measurement and instrument company headquartered in Solon, Ohio, that develops, manufactures, markets, and sells data acquisition products, as well as complete systems for high-volume production and assembly testing.

In September, 2010, the company agreed to sell itself to the Danaher Corporation, a Washington, D.C.–based conglomerate, for $21.60 per share. It was soon merged with Tektronix, Inc, which had been acquired by Danaher in 2007, and now exists wholly as a brand of Tektronix.

== History ==
Joseph F. Keithley founded Keithley Instrument in 1946. His first product, the "Phantom Repeater," amplified low-level electric signals so that they could be measured by more standard equipment. The device was used by physicists, chemists, and engineers in the development of hearing aids and amplifiers. The product enjoyed some success in sales, but it was the next product, an electrometer, that clinched the future for Keithley's fledgling company.

== General ==
The company designs, develops, manufactures and markets electronic instruments and systems geared to the specialized needs of electronics manufacturers for production testing, process monitoring, product development, and research.

The company has approximately 500 products used to source, measure, connect, control or communicate direct current (DC), radio frequency (RF), or optical signals. Product offerings include integrated systems solutions, instruments, and personal computer (PC) plug-in boards that can be used as system components or as stand-alone solutions.

The company's markets are engineers, technicians, and scientists in manufacturing, product development, and research functions.

Keithley operates throughout North America, Asia, and Europe. It develops new solutions for the broader electronics industry, as well as electronic manufacturing production test, semiconductor, telecommunications/wireless and research/education.

== Products ==
Keithley Instruments' major product lines included testing and measurement products such as electrometers, voltmeters, signal generators, data acquisition, and production and benchtop parametric testers and analyzers.

== Historical highlights ==
- 1946 – Founded in Cleveland, Ohio, U.S., by Joseph F. Keithley
- 1950 – First employee hired
  - John Yeager, the first employee, died 10 January 2018.
- 1964 – Moved headquarters to Solon, OH
- 1966 – German office opened
- 1967 – UK office opened
- 1991 – Joseph P. Keithley becomes chairman
- 1995 – Listed on New York Stock Exchange
- 1998 – Taiwan office opened
- 2000 – Korea office opened
- 2003 – Santa Rosa, California RF Design center opened (sold to Agilent Technologies 2009)
- 2005 – Singapore office opened
- 2009 – S600 Series parametric test product line discontinued
- 2010 – Agreed to sell itself to the Danaher Corporation, many operations merged with Tektronix
- 2011 – Announcement that most manufacturing will shift from Ohio to China
