= Edward T. Yu =

Edward T. Yu is an American physicist and engineer.

Yu earned his bachelor's and master's degrees in physics at Harvard University in 1986, then pursued doctoral studies in applied physics at the California Institute of Technology, graduating in 1991. Upon completing postdoctoral research at the Thomas J. Watson Research Center, he joined the University of California, San Diego faculty. Yu began his career at UCSD as an assistant professor, became an associate professor in 1996, then was promoted to a full professorship in 1998. In 2009, Yu moved to the University of Texas at Austin as Judson S. Swearingen Regents Chair in Engineering. Yu was elected a fellow of the IEEE in 2012.
