= Food safety incidents in Taiwan =

Food safety incidents in Taiwan have received international media scrutiny.

There have been several notable food safety incidents in Taiwan, including foods adulterated with chemical agents.

== 2011: Plasticizer use in food products ==
The most well-known food safety incident in Taiwan was the use in 2011 of the plasticizer DEHP to replace palm oil in food and drinks as a clouding agent. The chemical agent affects hormones and has been linked to developmental problems in children.

The foods affected includes beverages, fruit juices, bread, sports drinks, tea, and jam.

After two years of investigations, the Taiwanese government levied NT$1.2 million (around United States $40,000) in fines against 37 companies, or slightly more than US$1,000 per company.

=== History ===
In mid-May 2011, the Republic of China (ROC) authorities reported that two Taiwanese companies, Yu Shen Chemical Co. and Pin Han Perfumery Co., were using DEHP in clouding agents the firms manufactured. This was used as a substitute for palm oil in clouding agents as a way to keep cost down and improve profits. However, Wei Te Chemical Co., a manufacturer of clouding agents, claims that "the reason most businesses tended to utilize illegal clouding agents was not because of price, but rather the long preservation periods and esthetically pleasing effect of using DEHP-laced products."

Near the end of May, the government of the ROC had begun confiscating contaminated (DEPC-laced) products and announced a ban from exporting them. Later, the list for government safety checks was extended to syrups, tablets, pastries, and powders. By 27 May 2011, "up to 465,638 bottles of DEHP-tainted beverages have been pulled from store shelves. Also, up to 270,822 boxes and 68,924 packs of powdered probiotics and 28,539 kilos of fruit juices, fruit jam, powder, and syrup, and yoghurt powder have been removed from shelves", according to EcoWaste Coalition and a report from Food and Drug Administration (FDA Taiwan; Food and Drug Administration (Taiwan)).

As of mid-June, there are roughly 900 products which have been recalled from nearly 40,000 Taiwanese retailers. Some media reports, including in The Economist, conclude that Taiwan's former reputation as a reliable and safe food manufacturing country had been damaged.

Taiwanese prosecutors alleged that one of the companies, Yu Shen, at the center of the crisis used 5 tons of DEHP every month to manufacture clouding agents which were supplied to food processing firms and pastry shops. There were 95 Taiwanese manufacturers which had used the DEHP ingredient. An additional 244 ingredient manufacturing firms had also used the DEHP.

=== Reactions ===
==== Domestic ====
In 2011, Ma Ying-jeou stated that the government health units launched the nation's largest-ever action to secure food safety by checking up to 16,000 food makers and outlets, and removing from sales stands over 20,000 food and beverage items suspected of being contaminated with DEHP.

Health officials inspected over 14,000 food vendors and stores around the island, taking over 20,000 products off shelves.

Ma was criticized by the opposition Democratic Progressive Party (DPP) for his handling of the scandal. Opposition spokesperson Lin Yu-chang pushed the Ma Ying-jeou administration to come out with a new "D-Day" to combat the national plasticizer scare. The Kuomintang (KMT) criticized the DPP for their inability to detect DEHP while it was in power. They pointed out that DPP legislator Huang Sue-ying spoke against placing DEHP on the US Environmental Protection Agency's (EPA's) class-1 control list of toxic substances. KMT legislator Chiu Yi also alleged that the DPP had ties with the owner of the Yu Shen Company, Lai Chun-chieh. Lai's son also claimed on his Facebook webpage that DEHP was not responsible for cancer, contrary to studies that showed otherwise.

==== International ====
In 2011, mainland Chinese authorities banned 812 products from the original list of 22 from Taiwan. This included sports drinks, tea, jam, juices, and other beverages. China later upgraded the banned list to cover 1,004 products.

In Hong Kong, authorities started monitoring its residents for contamination-related health issues. They banned two types of Taiwanese sports beverages called Speed. Hong Kong's health secretary York Chow stated that because the ingestion of the carcinogen will be a health risk, he supported an outright ban of the DEHP agent. In neighboring Macau, health authorities found that the antacid Scrat Suspension tested positive for DIBP and later issued a notice of recall to local importers and pharmacies. Standard Chem&Pharm had notified its retailers to pull the product off the shelves in Taiwan and Macau.

Malaysian authorities found some bubble tea products were contaminated with DEHP and the importers were instructed to halt importation and ceased distribution of the products in Malaysia.

Authorities in the Philippines banned DEHP affected products and carried out investigations of importers to ensure affected products were recalled. Vietnam and South Korea both banned affected Taiwanese products from importation.

In the United States, California-based 99 Ranch Market, one of the largest Asian grocery chains in the country, removed plasticizer-contaminated beverages imported from Taiwan, off store shelves.

== 2013: Cooking oil adulteration and mislabeling ==
In October 2013, a scandal occurred in Taiwan regarding the presence of chlorophyllin in cooking oil. Subsequent investigations unearthed widespread adulteration and mislabeling amongst cooking oil products sold in Taiwan. The resulting scandal affected many products, even outside cooking oil, such as health pills, alcoholic beverages, milk, and rice.

=== Companies involved ===
==== Chang Chi Foodstuff Factory Co. ====
Chang Chi Foodstuff Factory Co. (Chinese: 大統長基) used copper chlorophyllin, an illegal coloring agent for cooking oil, in its olive oil and had adulterated its higher-end cooking oil with cheaper cottonseed oil. The company was fined NT$ 28.6 million in accordance to the Act Governing Food Sanitation after authorities found that their products had been adulterated. In December 2013, company chairman Kao Chen-li was sentenced to 16 years in prison for his role in the scandal. The company was also mandated to pay a further NT$50 million fine. A NT$1.85 billion fine levied by the Changhua County Public Health Bureau was annulled in July 2014 because Kao and two other company executives had already been put in jail. Kao Tsung-hsien of the Ministry of Health and Welfare's Administrative Appeal Committee stated:

Given that the Changhua District Court has handed down a punishment against the company’s chairman, Kao Cheng-li [in December last year], the committee members decided to cancel the NT$1.85 billion fine in accordance with Article 26 of the Administrative Penalty Act.

—

==== Flavor Full Food Inc. ====
Flavor Full Food Inc. (Chinese: 富味鄉食品股份有限公司) was accused of blending cheaper cottonseed oil into more expensive cooking oils to increase their profit. On 26 October 2013, the company admitted their wrongdoings through health officials. The company had adulterated 24 of its products sold in Taiwan with cheaper cottonseed oil, and also added flavoring agents to one of its peanut oil products. The company had been fined NT$8 million for 25 violations. The former chairman and his brother were each sentenced to 16 months in prison and ordered to pay NT$25 million in September 2014. The company itself was ordered to pay a further NT$5 million fine.

==== Formosa Oilseed Processing Co. ====
Formosa Oilseed Processing Co. (Chinese: 福懋油) was found to intentionally mislabel their six cooking oil mixtures as pure olive oils. The company general manager issued an apology saying that the company will stop selling the small-package olive oil. The company was fined NT$15 million.

==== Geneherbs Biotechnology Co. ====
The weight-loss pills manufactured by the Geneherbs Biotechnology Co. (Chinese: 菁茵荋生物科技) were found to contain unauthorized drugs. The pills product called the Wellslim Plus+ contains cetilistat, a lipase inhibitor designed to treat obesity.

==== Sing-Lin Foods Corporation ====
In early November, sodium copper chlorophyllin was found on Wu Mu (Chinese: 五木) steamed spinach ramen noodles manufactured by Sing-Lin Foods Corporation (Chinese: 興霖).

==== Taisun Enterprise Co. ====
On 20 November 2013, the FDA Taiwan of Ministry of Health and Welfare confirmed the grapeseed oil made by Taisun Enterprise Co. (Chinese: 泰山) contained the prohibited food additive copper chlorophyllin complex.

==== Ta Lien Alcohol Company ====
On 28 October 2013, the contents of 11 out of 12 alcohol products manufactured by Ta lien Alcohol Company (Chinese: 大聯製酒工業公司) were found not to match the ingredients listed on their labels as announced by the Department of Finance of Changhua County Government. The company was fined NT$5.5 million.

==== Ting Hsin International Group ====
The chairman of Ting Hsin International Group (Chinese: 頂新集團) was indicted in early November 2013 on fraud charges because of mislabeling products and violating the Act Governing Food Sanitation in connection to adulterated oil purchased from Chang Chi Foodstuff Factory Co.

==== Wei Chuan Food Corp ====
Wei Chuan Food Corp (Chinese: 味全食品) were found to be involved in an adulterated cooking oil scandal. The chairman of the company offered a public apology during a press conference on 5 November 2013.

=== Reactions ===
==== Domestic responses ====
ROC President – On 23 October 2013, President Ma Ying-jeou pledged to strengthen inspection on food and beverage manufacturers and severely punish those with altered food products. He also ordered the Ministry of Health and Welfare to hold a national food safety conference in November 2013 to address the issues.

Executive Yuan – The Executive Yuan had announced that it is setting up a joint food safety inspection and control team between the Yuan and Ministry of Health and Welfare and Council of Agriculture.

ROC Ministry of Health and Welfare (MOHW) – On 23 October 2013, Minister Chiu Wen-ta said that he took full responsibility for cracking down the 'black-hearted' food suppliers.

- FDA Taiwan – On 29 October, Deputy Head Wu Hsiu-ying said that the MOHW drafted law amendments to increase penalties for any food fraud. The maximum fines would be increased, while the minimum fines would remain the same. FDA Taiwan is also seeking heavier criminal penalties for manufacturers of adulterated or counterfeit food with longer prison terms. Rewards will also be given to any whistle blower exposing food fraud within his/her company.
- Deputy Minister Shiu Ming-neng held an interim press conference on 30 October 2013. There was a list of 37 cooking oil products and MOHW officials would conduct investigations of the manufacturers because the products were suspected of containing fatty acid issues. The list consisted of Taisun Enterprise Co. (Chinese: 泰山), Ting Hsin International Group (Chinese: 頂新集團), and Taiwan Sugar Corporation (Chinese: 台糖).

ROC Minister of Economic Affairs (MOEA) – Vice Minister Woody Duh said that the MOEA Industrial Development Bureau was reviewing the Good Manufacturing Practice (GMP) system and might require a manufacturer to present its export and import invoices and declarations to allow on-the-spot inspection for its production line when it seeks certification. He said that the MOEA will ensure that the GMP is a guarantee for safety, and without it, consumers will be exposed to unsafe foods.

ROC Environmental Protection Administration – Minister Stephen Shen said on 28 October 2013 that he would instruct local cleaning squads to accept and recycle oil bottles that still contain the adulterated oil.

Democratic Progressive Party – Former Chairman Shih Ming-teh said on 24 October 2013 that he and his friends would file a class-action lawsuit against Flavor Full Food Inc. to seek compensation over its adulterated oil products because his household's organic sesame oil was from the company. Any compensation he received from the lawsuit will be donated to charity organizations.

==== International responses ====
===== China =====
In Mainland China, a food distributor in Fujian filed a lawsuit against Chang Chi Foodstuff Factory Co. to seek damages for compensation. Xiamen had ordered 40,000 liters of cooking oil made by the company to be removed from shelves and stepped up inspections on edible oil products purchased from Taiwan.

===== Singapore =====
Singaporean food suppliers that source from Taiwan cooking oil companies involved in the food scandal were ordered to hold their shipping by the Government of Singapore on 22 October 2013.

===== United States =====
In the US, stores removed all Taiwanese foods tainted by the chemicals and other questionable products from the shelves.

== 2014: Gutter oil incident ==
=== 2014 Taiwanese Adulterated Oil Scandal ===
In September 2014, reports of adulteration of cooking oil with recycled waste oil and animal feed began to surface. Despite coming to light only in 2014, mass food adulteration by Taiwanese food conglomerates, however, had been suppressed for decades, and the food safety crisis was among the reasons for the electoral defeat of the Kuomintang in late 2014. At least 1,256 businesses were affected in the gutter oil scandal.

=== First case ===
The series of incidents first came to light on 4 September 2014, when it was discovered that tainted cooking oil was being produced by Kaohsiung-based company Chang Guann Co. (強冠企業) and branded as Chuan Tung Fragrant Lard Oil (全統香豬油). The company was found to have blended cooking oil with recycled oil, grease, and leather cleaner. The recycled oil was processed by an unlicensed factory in Pingtung County owned by Kuo Lieh-cheng (郭烈成), who allegedly purchased the oil from waste recycler Hu Hsin-te (胡信德), whose factory is named Shun Te Enterprises (順德企業行), located in the Daliao District of Kaohsiung.

Chang Guann purchased up to 243 tons of recycled waste oil disguised as lard from the Pingtung factory, starting in February 2014. The company then allegedly refined the waste oil before mixing it with processed lard and selling the tainted product to its distributors. The recycled waste oil was collected from restaurants, and included discarded animal parts, fat, and skin.

The President of Chang Guann Co. apologized to the public on 4 September 2014. He emphasized that his company was not aware and did not intentionally buy the tainted oil, and that the oil the company purchased from the illegal Pingtung factory was not cheaper than oil from other oil suppliers.

On 11 September 2014, reports revealed that Chang Guann had also imported 87.72 tons of lard oil falsely listed for human consumption from Hong Kong-based Globalway Corp Ltd. (金寶運貿易) but was actually meant for animal use only. Since 2008, Chang Guann had imported 56 batches of lard oil weighing 2,385.1 tons from Hong Kong, about 300 tons of which were purchased from Globalway Corp between 2011 and 2014.

The Taiwan Food Good Manufacturing Practice Development Association (TFGMPDA) reported that the cooking oil produced by Chang Guann has never been awarded GMP certification, although the TFGMPDA issued an apology saying that five food companies whose products have won GMP certification have used the tainted oil.

Schools around Taiwan pulled all of the products containing the tainted oil from their school meals after 16 schools were discovered to be using the adulterated oil products.

Chang Guann was found in violation of the Act Governing Food Safety and Sanitation and fined NT$50 million. Yeh Wen-hsiang (葉文祥), chairman of Chang Guann, was arrested for fraud for his role in the scandal.

The FDA Taiwan began indefinitely halting imports of edible lard oil from Hong Kong on 11 September.

On 1 October, prosecutors revealed that after viewing lab results, Kuo Lieh-cheng admitted that oil he sold to Chang Guann Co. was mixed with corpse oil, gutter oil, grease and leather cleaner, and recycled oil.

On 3 October, the Minister of Health and Welfare Chiu Wen-ta resigned in the aftermath of the scandal.

=== Second case ===
On 9 October 2014, prosecutors launched an investigation into a unit of Ting Hsin International Group (頂新國際集團) over the sale of alleged tainted cooking oil. Prosecutor Tsai Li-yi said the Ting Hsin unit Cheng-I Food Co. (正義股份有限公司) was being investigated over allegedly mixing animal feed oil with cooking oil and then selling it for human consumption. Cheng-I Food Co. had an estimated 80% share of the lard and lard-based oil market in Taiwan. Wei Ying-chung (魏應充), former chairman of three subsidiaries within Ting Hsin International Group and the third of the four Wei brothers controlling the conglomerate, was previously indicted on charges of fraud as part of an investigation into the 2013 Taiwan food scandal.

After the revelations, the Taiwan public boycotted Ting Hsin items, with a number of local governments, restaurants, traditional markets, and schools refusing to consume the conglomerate's products. On 16 October, Ting Hsin announced that it will leave Taiwan's oil market and donate NT$3 billion toward food safety under the supervision of Ruentex Financial Group (潤泰集團) Chairman Samuel Yin.

On 17 October, the Changhua District Court granted a request to detain Wei Ying-chung. On October 21, prosecutors said according to Ting Shin's Vietnamese oil supplier Dai Hanh Phuc, the majority of animal feed-grade oil imported by Ting Shin may be used in the China market. In response, consumers in China called for a united boycott against Ting Hsin products.

In November, Ting Hsin's products were tested for Agent Orange since an unnamed source told authorities that the oil Ting Hsin imported from Vietnam may contain traces of the herbicidal weapon.

The Kaohsiung District Court ruled that Cheng-I Food owed NT$9.36 million in damages.

=== Third case ===
On 3 November 2014, prosecutors in Tainan took Lu Ching-hsieh, owner of Beei Hae Edible Co. and Hsieh Ching Corp. and his wife, Lu Huang Li-hua, into custody on suspicion of manufacturing cooking oil using substandard oil. Prosecutors said Hsieh Ching had bought animal feed-grade beef tallow and vegetable oil from Jin Hong, a trading company, and then allegedly mixed the ingredients together for sale as cooking oil.

=== Affected companies ===
According to FDA Taiwan, a number of companies made food products using the tainted oil, including well-known brands such as Taiwan Sugar Corporation, Ve Wong Corp. (味王), Chi Mei Frozen Food Co. (奇美食品), Sheng Hsiang Jen Foods Co. (盛香珍食品), Gourmet Master Co. (美食達人), Yilin Group (憶霖), Hawdii Foods Co. (好帝一食品有限公司), etc. Restaurant chains, shops, and stores were also affected, such as Good Morning (早安美芝城), Wu Wha Ma Dumpling Home (五花馬), Magie du Levain (樂金食品), Yu Jen Jai (玉珍齋), Lee Hou Cake Store (李鵠餅店), Black Bridge Foods (黑橋牌食品), Li Ji Cake Store (犁記餅店), etc.

Wei-Chuan Food Corporation (味全), a subsidiary of Ting Hsin International Group, which was previously cited with using adulterated cooking oil in 2013, was also involved in using tainted cooking oil produced by Chang Guann. Its share price plummeted after the company announced a recall of 12 products made from the recycled oil: canned pork, pork sauces, meat paste, and pork floss. The company promised refunds to its customers. The recall announcement subsequently also brought down the share prices of other related food companies.

=== Reactions ===
==== Domestic ====
- President Ma Ying-jeou made a public statement saying that the oil scandal happened due to lax inspection of food manufacturing factories by local governments, and he urged local municipalities to strengthen checks on those facilities. Democratic Progressive Party spokesman Huang Di-ying said President Ma should not shift the blame solely to the local governments since Chang Guann Co. has also allegedly imported over 2,400 tons of industrial-grade lard from Hong Kong over the last 6 years, with no foul play spotted by the central government.
- Premier Jiang Yi-huah demanded that the Legislative Yuan officials ensure food products containing the adulterated cooking oil were removed from store shelves and sealed. He also vowed to severely punish those who were involved in the manufacturing of the recycled oils, even though they met food safety standards.
- Vice Premier Mao Chi-kuo described the selling of recycled oil by Chang Guann Co. as a vile criminal act and demanded the most severe penalties for the perpetrators.
- The Ministry of Health and Welfare commissioned a group of experts to examine the health implications of consuming the illegal cooking oil. The Taiwan FDA immediately released a list of 235 food companies around Taiwan that had reportedly purchased the tainted oil products. They also tested the tainted oil for any heavy metals, aflatoxin, and benzopyrene, which may cause cancer in humans. However, they came out with a conclusion that products from the tainted oil did not pose any immediate health effects because 67% of the oil was still genuine, although the remaining adulterated materials required further examination.
- Minister of Economic Affairs Woody Duh urged the Taiwanese food companies to increase their level of alert when obtaining materials for their products and to make onsite inspections at their suppliers' production facilities. The Industrial Development Bureau of the ministry planned to implement a full-scale monitoring system to trace the sources of raw materials and check the quality of all finished and processed food products to prevent future similar incidents.
- Investigators from the Ministry of Justice went through the bank accounts belonging to the companies and individuals involved in the tainted oil case to ensure that all of their illegal gains were confiscated.
- The Ministry of National Defense removed all food products that could contain the tainted oil from its military stores serving the armed forces.
- The Criminal Investigation Bureau of the National Police Agency, accompanied by environmental and health officials, raided and swept the unlicensed Pingtung factory. Investigators found that the low-grade oil refined from food waste had been procured by several other companies and repackaged as lard oil to be sold to clients, and it was expected that at least around 200 tons of the oil had entered the market.
- The Department of Health of Kaohsiung City Government fined Chang Guann Co. NT$50 million, the highest that can be imposed on violations under Article 15–1 of the Act Governing Food Safety and Sanitation (食品安全衛生管理法). The city's Economic Development Bureau also shut down Shun Te Enterprises after it was found to be unregistered.
- Two separate protests occurred in front of the Executive Yuan, on 12 September and 17 October, demanding the resignations of Jiang and later Ma.

==== International ====
The General Administration of Quality Supervision, Inspection and Quarantine carefully examined the records of the claimed-affected companies and restaurants. They also warned customers to be cautious of food products that may contain the tainted oil.

Secretary for Food and Health Ko Wing-man said that the Hong Kong Government would check whether any food imported into the region had any tainted oil from Taiwan. The authorities would try to trace the buyers of the tainted oil. On 10 October, health authorities ordered a total ban on and the recall of all animal oils imported from Taiwan.

The Government of Macau was criticized because of lax inspection of food ingredient imports, although the authorities had earlier said that at least 21 local food manufacturers and retailers had been using oils supplied by Chang Guann Co.

The Food and Drug Administration (Philippines) told businesses to pull questionable Taiwanese food products off shelves and said that the Philippines would accelerate signing a memorandum of cooperation with Taiwan on strengthening food safety checks.

The Agri-Food and Veterinary Authority of Singapore conducted tests on suspicious food items imported from Taiwan. The incident also prompted some retailers in the country to seek clarification from their Taiwanese suppliers. Travel agencies also prevented Singaporeans from buying suspected tainted products in Taiwan.

== 2014: Methyl yellow in tofu ==
In November 2014, it was found that dried tofu products (豆乾; dougan) had been adulterated with an industrial dye, methyl yellow (also known as dimethyl), for some 20 years. In December 2014, it was found that even regular non-dyed tofu were contaminated with carcinogens, resulting in over 25,000 kg being recalled.

Tofu and seasoning products from Taiwanese manufacturers were found to be adulterated in the latest of a string of related scandals beginning in November 2014. The scandal was initially uncovered by Hong Kong authorities regarding the many flavored types of dried preserved tofu, that were recalled for toxic industrial dye methyl yellow contamination, after an investigation confirmed that this adulteration had been going on undetected for over 20 years. A major supplier to 44 manufacturers, Chien Hsin Enterprises (芊鑫實業社) of Tainan city, was implicated as the origin. Despite the fact that methyl yellow can often be detected by color (bright yellow), a further scandal erupted in the following days regarding regular tofu (white or oil color, if fried). Regular tofu products were also contaminated with a carcinogen. At least 25,760 kg of deliberately contaminated emulsifier for tofu were traced to the distributor. In the following days, ramen noodle seasoning packets were also found to be contaminated with methyl yellow, include some popular major ramen manufacturers previously implicated in the prior gutter oil scandals These products are exported worldwide, including US, Malaysia, Indonesia, Canada, Australia, Vietnam, Hong Kong, and China, primarily on the shelves of Asian food stores. As of December 18, 2014, 73 products have been recalled related to methyl yellow contamination.
