= Streptomyces bangladeshensis =

Scientific classification
- Domain: Bacteria
- Kingdom: Bacillati
- Phylum: Actinomycetota
- Class: Actinomycetes
- Order: Streptomycetales
- Family: Streptomycetaceae
- Genus: Streptomyces
- Species: S. bangladeshensis

Binomial name
- Streptomyces bangladeshensis Al-Bari et al. 2005

Type strain
- AAB-4, DSM 41874, JCM 14924, LMG 22738, NBRC 102113, NRRL B-24326

Species of bacterium

Streptomyces bangladeshensis is a thermophilic bacterium species from the genus of Streptomyces which has been isolated from soil in Natore in Bangladesh. Streptomyces bangladeshensis produces bis(2-ethylhexyl) phthalate.

== See also ==
- List of Streptomyces species
