= Sinphar Pharmaceutical =

Taiwanese pharmaceutical company

- Native name: 杏輝藥品工業股份有限公司
- Type: Public
- Traded as: TWSE: 001734
- Industry: Pharmaceuticals
- Founded: 1977; 49 years ago
- Headquarters: Yilan County, Taiwan
- Products: ointments, gels, creams, capsules, tablets, powders, injections, medical devices, functional foods and cosmetics
- Number of employees: 1800
- Website: www.sinphar.com.tw/en/

Sinphar Pharmaceutical (Chinese: 杏輝藥品工業股份有限公司; Tongyong Pinyin: Sìng hueī yàopǐn gōngyè gǔfèn yǒusiàn gōngsī; TWSE: 001734) is a Taiwanese pharmaceutical company engaged in the research, development, manufacturing, and sales of pharmaceuticals. It also operated a functional food business. Main products of the company include ointments, gels, creams, capsules, tablets, powders, injections, medical devices, functional foods and cosmetics. These products are supplied to markets both within and outside Taiwan through hospitals, pharmacies, clinics, and distributors.

Founded in 1977 by Chih-Wen Lee and based in Yilan County, it has a market cap of US$205 million, 984 employees and annual sales of $106 million as of 2026.

According to a news report from Liberty Times, the company's products are "seeing gradual growth in Southeast Asian countries like Thailand, Malaysia, Vietnam, and Indonesia; one product is expected to receive approval in Vietnam this year, while multiple products are currently undergoing registration in Thailand, Malaysia, Indonesia, and Hong Kong, with staggered launches anticipated starting in 2027".

On September 11, 2020, six drug products by Sinphar were found to contain less than 90% of their active ingredients and were subject to a full recall. Following a further investigation by the Food and Drug Administration (Taiwan), another 14 substandard products were identified on September 21; issues included failure to conduct timely testing and discoloration of ointments—problems the manufacturer had failed to address promptly. In addition to ordering the products' removal from the market, the FDA imposed fines ranging from NT$30,000 to NT$2 million in accordance with the law and mandated corrective actions by October 6.
