= Day Guey-ing =

Taiwanese physician-scientist

- 戴桂英

Deputy Minister of Department of Health of the Republic of China
- In office 4 September 2012 – July 2013
- Minister: Chiu Wen-ta
- Succeeded by: Tseng Chung-ming

Personal details
- Education: National Taiwan University (MD, MPH, PhD)

Day Guey-ing (Chinese: 戴桂英; pinyin: Dài Guìyīng) is a Taiwanese physician-scientist. She was the deputy minister of the Department of Health in 2012–2013.

== Education ==
Day studied medicine at National Taiwan University, where she earned her Doctor of Medicine (M.D.), Master of Public Health (M.P.H.), and then her Ph.D. in public health in 2007. Her doctoral dissertation was titled, "A study on follow-up medical care for discharged stroke patients".

== ROC Department of Health Deputy Ministry ==
=== Tobacco duty raise ===
Speaking at the Executive Yuan in early May 2013 in responding to the amendment by the cabinet to raise the tax and health and welfare surcharge on tobacco to help reduce Taiwanese who smoke, Day said that even when the Legislative Yuan approves the bill, it will not meet the standard set by the World Bank because the value is still less than standard. She said that an extra increase is needed to meet the standard. The extra revenues received would be used to fund various welfare projects around Taiwan.
