= Journal of Food and Drug Analysis =

Scientific journal about food and pharmacology

- Discipline: Food science & technology, pharmacology
- Language: English
- Edited by: Gow-Chin Yen

Publication details
- History: 1993–present
- Publisher: Food and Drug Administration (Taiwan) (Taiwan)
- Frequency: Quarterly
- Open access: Yes
- License: CC-BY-NC-ND 4.0
- Impact factor: 3.6 (2022)

Standard abbreviations
- ISO 4: J. Food Drug Anal.

Indexing
- CODEN: JFDAAF
- ISSN: 1021-9498 (print); 2224-6614 (web)
- LCCN: 2014243386
- OCLC no.: 870142396

Links
- Journal homepage

The Journal of Food and Drug Analysis is a quarterly peer-reviewed open-access scientific journal published by the Taiwanese Food and Drug Administration. It contains review and research articles covering food science, pharmacology, and chemical analysis. The journal was established in 1993 and the editor-in-chief is Gow-Chin Yen (National Chung Hsing University).

== Editors ==
The following persons are or have been editor-in-chief of the journal:

- Erick Tsi-Tee Suen (1993-2008)
- Chian-Fang Tseng (2009)
- Chun-Sheng Chien (2010)
- Ming-Neng Shiu (2011)
- Shiow-Ing Wu (2012)
- Lucy Sun Hwang (2013-2017)
- Gow-Chin Yen (2018-present)

== Abstracting and indexing ==
The journal is abstracted and indexed in:

- Analytical Abstracts
- Biological Abstracts
- BIOSIS Previews
- CAB Abstracts
- Chemical Abstracts Service
- CINAHL
- EBSCO databases
- Embase
- Food Science and Technology Abstracts
- Index Medicus/MEDLINE/PubMed
- ProQuest databases
- Science Citation Index Expanded
- Scopus

According to the Journal Citation Reports, the journal has a 2022 impact factor of 3.67.
