= Kung-Yee Liang =

Taiwanese biostatistician (born 1951)

- 梁賡義
- Born: September 7, 1951 (age 74)
- Education: National Tsing Hua University (BS); University of South Carolina (MS); University of Washington (PhD)
- Known for: Generalized estimating equation
- Scientific career
- Fields: Biostatistics
- Workplaces: Johns Hopkins University; National Yang-Ming University; National Health Research Institutes; Feng Chia University
- Thesis: The Asymptotic Equivalence of Conditional and Unconditional Inference Procedures (1982)
- Doctoral advisor: Norman Breslow

Kung-Yee Liang (Chinese: 梁賡義; pinyin: Liáng Gēng yí; born September 7, 1951) is a Taiwanese biostatistician known for his work on generalized estimating equations, which he introduced together with Scott Zeger in 1986. He is a distinguished chair professor at Feng Chia University and the chairman of OBI Pharma, Inc.

From 1982 to 2010, Liang was a professor at the department of biostatistics at the Johns Hopkins Bloomberg School of Public Health. In 2010, Liang returned to Taiwan, where he was the president of National Yang-Ming University from 2010 to 2017 and the president of the National Health Research Institutes from 2017 to 2022.

== Education and career ==
Liang earned a bachelor's degree in mathematics from National Tsing Hua University in 1973 before coming to the U.S., where he received a master's degree in statistics from the University of South Carolina in 1979. In 1982, Liang completed his PhD in biostatistics at the University of Washington under the supervision of Norman Breslow. His dissertation was titled The Asymptotic Equivalence of Conditional and Unconditional Inference Procedures.

That same year, he joined the biostatistics department faculty at the Johns Hopkins Bloomberg School of Public Health where he became a full professor in 1991 and stayed until he returned to Taiwan in 2010.

Returning to his home country, Liang moved from conducting research towards administrative and leadership roles. In August 2010, Liang became president of National Yang-Ming University, a position he remained in until November 2017.

From December 2017 to December 2022, he was the president of the National Health Research Institutes. During his time as a vice president of the organisation (2003–2006), he had already served as the acting president of the organisation between January and June 2006.

Since February 2023, Liang has been Distinguished Chair Professor at Feng Chia University.

On December 29, 2023, he was elected as chairman of OBI Pharma, Inc.

== Awards and recognition ==
Liang has received multiple awards for his work, including the Snedecor Award from the Committee of Presidents of Statistical Societies in 1987, the Rema Lapouse Award from the American Public Health Association in 2010, and the International Statistical Institute's Karl Pearson Prize in 2015. In 2025, he received the Presidential Science Prize of Taiwan, the country's highest honor for scientific research.

In 1995, Liang was elected as a Fellow of the American Statistical Association. He was elected as an academician of the Academia Sinica in 2002, as a fellow of The World Academy of Sciences in 2012, and as a member of the National Academy of Medicine in 2015.
