= Guiying =

Guiying (Chinese: 桂英; pinyin: Guìyīng) is a common Chinese female given name, and may refer to:

- Gao Guiying, female Chinese revolutionary, rebellion-leader and army-commander
- Mu Guiying, Chinese legendary heroine
- Day Guey-ing (pinyin: Dài Guìyīng), Taiwanese politician
