= National Yang-Ming University =

University in Beitou, Taipei, Taiwan

- 國立陽明大學
- Motto: 真知力行、仁心仁術
- Motto in English: benevolent mind and art, putting knowledge into practice
- Type: Public (National)
- Active: 1975–2021
- Affiliations: UST; GLORIA; China Development Fund; UAiTED
- President: Kuo Hsu-Sung (郭旭崧)
- Academic staff: 393
- Undergraduates: 1,836
- Postgraduates: 2,297
- Location: Shipai, Beitou, Taipei, Taiwan; 25.12160°N 121.51381°E
- Website: ym.edu.tw

Chinese name
- Simplified Chinese: 国立阳明大学
- Traditional Chinese: 國立陽明大學
Transcriptions
Standard Mandarin
- Hanyu Pinyin: Guólì Yángmíng Dàxué

National Yang-Ming University (NYMU) was a public research university in Shipai, Beitou District, Taipei, Taiwan.

Yang-Ming was named after the Chinese philosopher Wang Yangming. It was merged with National Chiao Tung University into the newly formed National Yang Ming Chiao Tung University on 1 February 2021.

NYMU was known for research in the fields of Medicine, Life Sciences and Biotechnology. It was one of the seven national research universities.

== History ==
The university was founded in 1975 as the National Yang-Ming College of Medicine to cultivate first-class medical professionals and biomedical scientists. In 1994, it was granted university status to National Yang-Ming University by the Ministry of Education and became the first university in Taiwan dedicated to biomedical education and research. Along with its original mission, the university was devoted to excelling in biomedical research, and to promoting intercollegiate and international collaboration.

In the 30 years since its founding, NYMU enjoyed a robust growth. By the end of the 2005 academic year, NYMU became a medium-sized university with 5 schools - Medicine, Dentistry, Medical Technology and Biomedical Engineering, Life Sciences and Nursing, and a Center for General Education. Additionally, the Taipei Veterans General Hospital, served as the teaching hospital for medical and paramedical students. NYMU also established 15 research centers with a wide spectrum of emphases including Genomic Medicine, Brain Research, Cognitive Neuroscience, Immunology, Cellular and Molecular Biology, Biomedical Engineering, Medical Imaging, Biophotonics, Bioinformatics, Health Informatics, AIDS, Community Medicine, and Community Nursing.

President Kung-Yee Liang was awarded the Rema Lapouse Award in 2010.

As of 2019 the President of NYMU was Steve Kuo and the vice president was William Stanton.

Negotiations on a merger between National Yang-Ming University and National Chiao Tung University began in December 2018. Both educational institutions voted to proceed with the merger in September 2019, which was approved by the Ministry of Education in June 2020.

== Organization ==
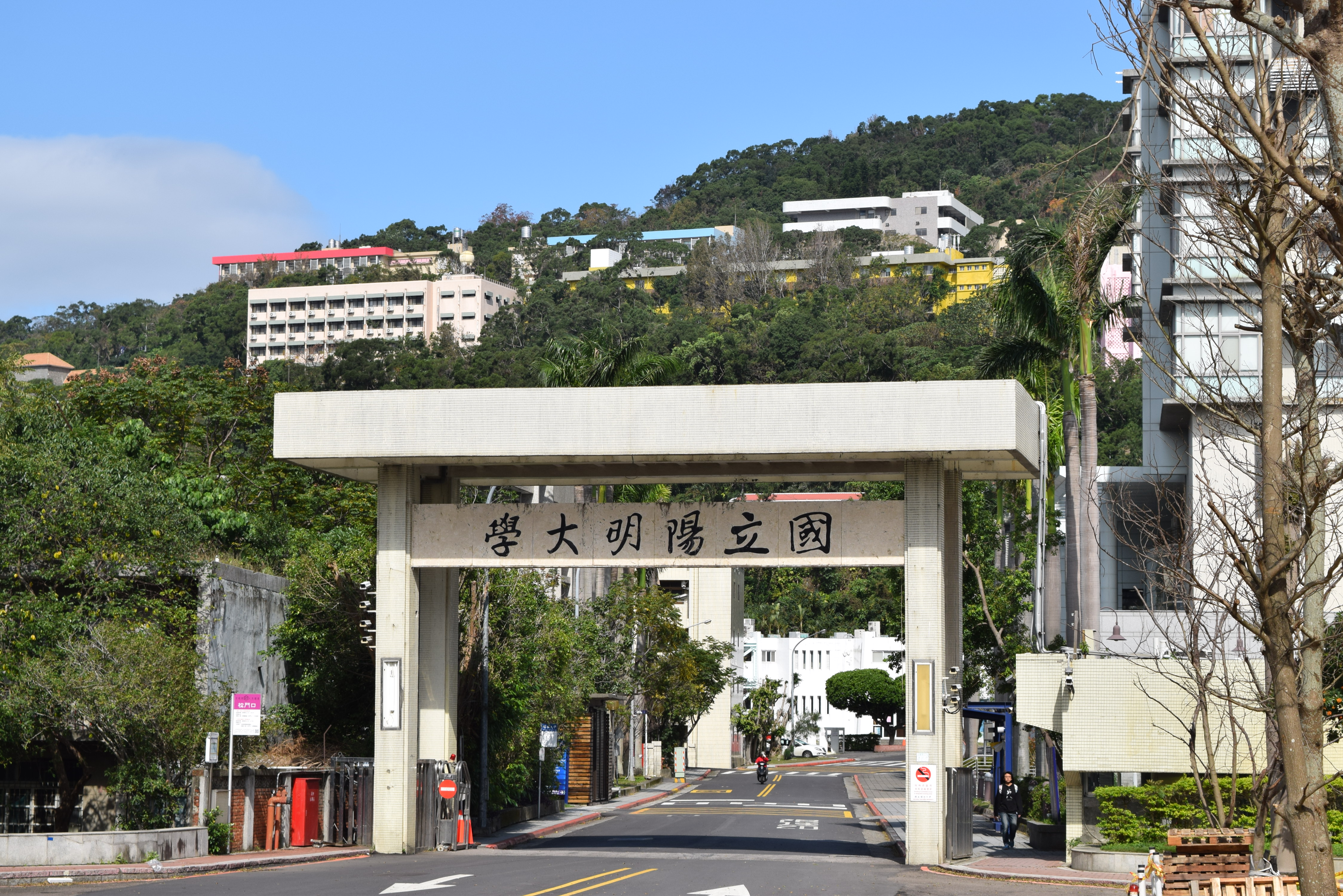
National Yang-Ming University main entrance

The university had 7 departments and 28 graduate institutes, which are organized into 6 schools: Biomedical Science and Engineering, Dentistry, Humanities and Social Sciences, Life Sciences, Medicine, and Nursing. In 2007, NYMU enrolled 1,836 undergraduate students and 2,297 graduate students.

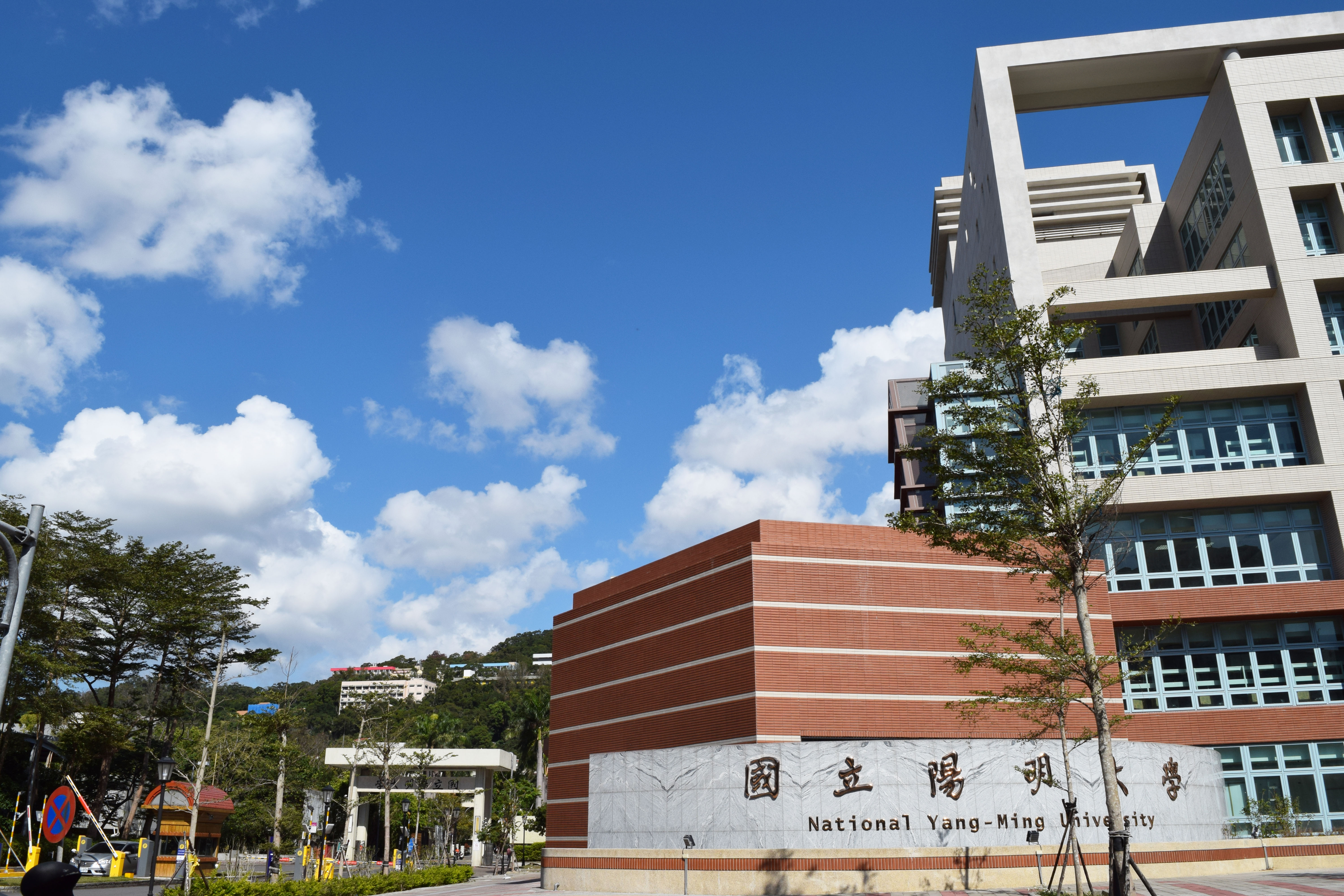
National Yang-Ming University

== International programs ==
NYMU participated in the Molecular Medicine Program and the Bioinformatics Program of the Taiwan International Graduate Program of Academia Sinica, Taiwan's most preeminent academic research institution.

== Ranking ==
University rankings

Global – Overall
- ARWU World: 501-600
- QS World: 298
- THE World: 401–500

Regional – Overall
- QS Asia: 113
- THE Asia: 100

== Partners health care system ==
In cooperation with Taipei City Hospital System and National Chengchi University, the three institution formed a health care system which covers medical education, healthcare, and management.

== Notable alumni ==
- Shiu Ming-neng, Vice Minister of Health and Welfare (2013–2016)

== See also ==
- List of universities in Taiwan
- Education in Taiwan
