= Tseng Chung-ming =

Taiwanese physician

- 曾中明

Deputy Minister of Health and Welfare of the Republic of China
- In office 23 July 2013 – 21 June 2015
- Minister: Chiu Wen-ta; Lin Tzou-yien (acting); Chiang Been-huang
- Vice: Shiu Ming-neng
- Preceded by: Day Guey-ing

Deputy Minister of the Interior of the Republic of China
- In office March 2009 – July 2013
- Minister: Liao Liou-yi; Jiang Yi-huah; Lee Hong-yuan

Personal details
- Died: 21 June 2015 Beitou, Taipei, Taiwan
- Education: Soochow University (BS); National Chengchi University (MS)

Tseng Chung-ming (Chinese: 曾中明; pinyin: Céng Zhōngmíng; Pe̍h-ōe-jī: Chan Tiong-bêng) was a Taiwanese physician. He was the Deputy Minister of Health and Welfare from 2013 to 2015, and had previously served in the same position within the Ministry of the Interior.

== Education ==
Tseng obtained his bachelor's degree from Soochow University in 1979 and master's degree from National Chengchi University in 1981.

== Political career ==
Tseng worked in various positions at the Kaohsiung City Government from September 1983 to October 1986. From October 1984 until March 1994, he held various positions at the Taipei City Government. In March 1994, he moved to the Ministry of the Interior (MOI). Tseng was the deputy director of the Department of Social Affairs of the MOI from February 1999 to February 2006. He then served as the director of the Department of Social Affairs of the MOI from February 2006 to March 2009.

== Death ==
Tseng died on 21 June 2015 at the age of 60 at Taipei Veterans General Hospital due to cirrhosis and lung cancer.
