= OBI Pharma, Inc. =

- Native name: 台灣浩鼎生技股份有限公司
- Type: Public
- Traded as: TWSE: 4174(TPEx)
- Industry: Pharmaceuticals
- Founded: 2002
- Headquarters: 6F, No. 508, Sec. 7, Zhongxiao E RdNangang District, Taipei City, 115, Taiwan
- Key people: Kung-Yee Liang (Chairman) Ya-Chi Chen (CEO)
- Number of employees: 133
- Website: www.obipharma.com

OBI Pharma, Inc. (Chinese: 台灣浩鼎生技股份有限公司) (TWSE: 4174) is a bio-pharmaceutical company, based in Nangang District, Taipei, Taiwan.

== History ==
The company was founded by Micheal N.Chang on April 29, 2002. It was formerly a subsidiary of Optimer Pharmaceuticals.

On 9 Feb 2007, its parent company Optimer Pharmaceuticals can buy/sell on Nasdaq Stock Exchange. At that time, its share price was US$8.50 per share.

On 15 May 2012, OBI Pharma, Inc. was approved to become a public company in Taiwan.

On 23 Mar 2015, it can do transaction formally on OTC in Taiwan R.O.C.

On February 8, 2022: OBI Pharma (4174.TWO) announced the development of its COVID-19 vaccine, BCVax.

2023, BCVax received approval from Taiwan’s Food and Drug Administration (TFDA) for a Phase I clinical trial.

2023, Anticancer drug OBI-3424 was approved by TFDA for a Phase II clinical trial. In the same year, OBI Pharma developed its proprietary ADC platforms, including a cysteine-based conjugation platform and GlycOBI™.

2023, OBI Pharma obtained ISO/IEC 27001 certification for information security management.

2023, OBI Pharma and its subsidiary, OBIGEN Pharma Biotech, signed an exclusive global medical use license agreement for OBI-858.

2023, OBI Pharma signed a licensing agreement with Ablexis, LLC for the global rights to the "Nectin4 human antibody sequence."

On December 29, 2023: Kung-Yee Liang succeeded as Chairman of OBI Pharma.

On January 31, 2024: The Phase III trial of Adagloxad Simolenin (OBI-822) and OBI-821 for triple-negative breast cancer completed its first interim analysis, with the Data and Safety Monitoring Board (DSMB) recommending continuation.

On March 11, 2024: OBI Pharma’s board decided to halt patient enrollment in the OBI-3424 Phase II trial, while collaboration with international partners continued.

On June 12, 2024: OBI-992, a TROP2-targeted ADC, received U.S. FDA approval for a Phase I/II clinical trial to evaluate its safety and efficacy in solid tumors.

On August 7, 2024: OBI-992 was granted U.S. FDA orphan drug designation for gastric cancer, including gastroesophageal junction adenocarcinoma.

On September 24, 2024: OBI-992 was shortlisted for the "2024 Most Promising Clinical Candidate" at the 11th World ADC Awards.

On October 13, 2024: OBI Pharma’s partner, Ascentawits (Shenzhen), presented Phase II interim results for AST-3424 (OBI-3424) at the CSCO meeting, receiving an "Outstanding Paper Award."

On December 11, 2024: OBI Pharma received the Sports Enterprise Certification from Taiwan’s Ministry of Education for the second time.

On December 23, 2024: OBI Pharma signed marketing and material transfer agreements with Japan’s GlyTech to promote GlycOBI® ADC technology in Japan’s biopharma industry.

On March 12, 2025: OBI Pharma won the "Most Promising ADC Clinical Candidate in Taiwan" award at the ADC Asia Congress 2025 in Singapore.

On March 18, 2025: OBIGEN Pharma, an OBI Pharma subsidiary, appointed OBI Pharma CEO Heidi Wang as Chairman, succeeding Frank Chen, who resigned.

On March 26, 2025: OBI Pharma received the "Most Promising Immunotherapy Pipeline" award from the Taiwan Bio-Excellence Awards (TBEA).

On April 30, 2026: Dr. Ya-Chi Chen, Chief Scientific Officer of OBI Pharma, assumed the role of Acting Chief Executive Officer.

== Primary Focus ==
The company mainly concentrates on the development of the research and development of cancer therapies and high-quality drugs.
