= Yeh Ching-chuan =

Taiwanese physician and epidemiologist (born 1950)

- 葉金川
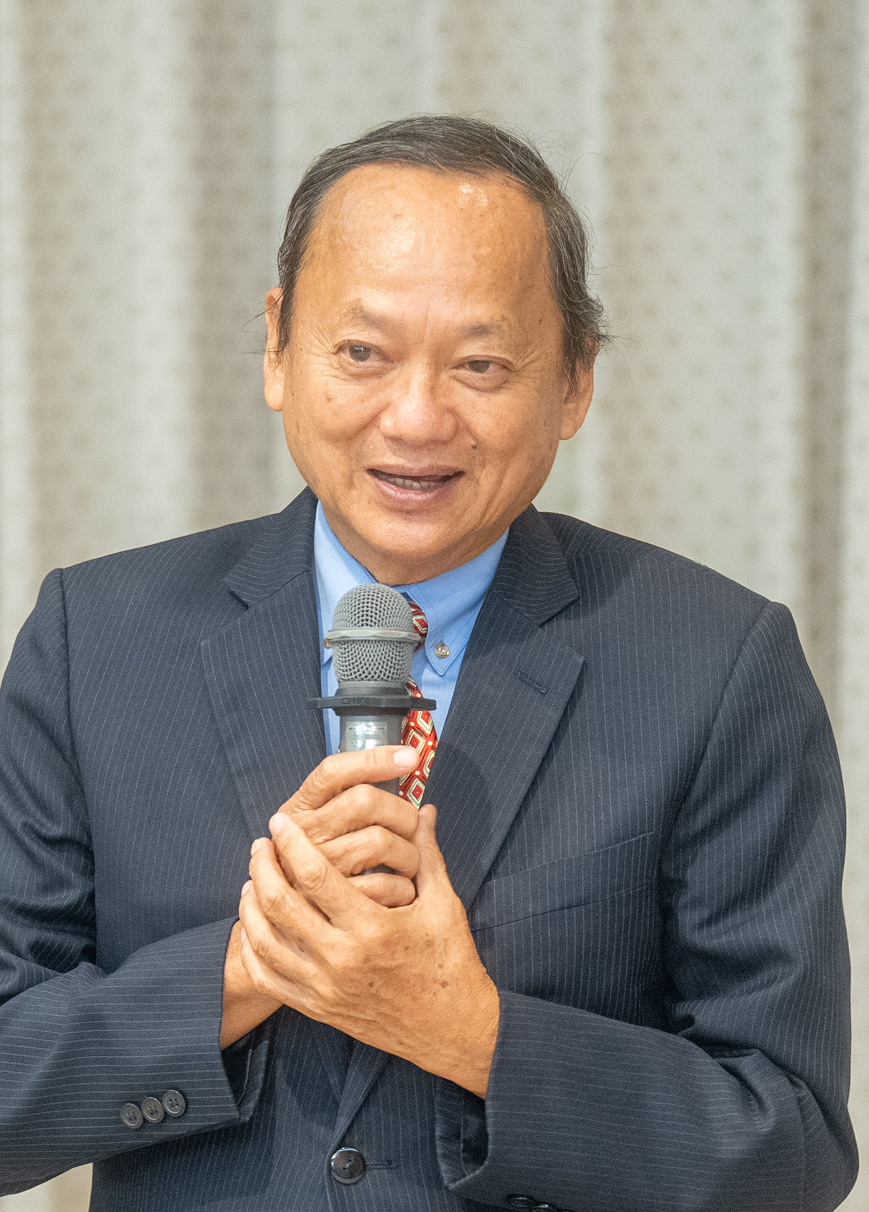
- Yeh in 2023

12th Minister of Department of Health of the Republic of China
- In office 26 September 2008 – 6 August 2009
- Preceded by: Lin Fang-yue
- Succeeded by: Yang Chih-liang

Personal details
- Born: 29 June 1950 (age 75) Dadaocheng, Datong, Taipei, Taiwan
- Party: Kuomintang
- Education: National Taiwan University (MB, MPH); Harvard University (MS)

Yeh Ching-chuan (Chinese: 葉金川; pinyin: Yè Jīnchuān; born 29 June 1950) is a Taiwanese physician and epidemiologist.

== Education ==
Yeh attended medical school at National Taiwan University, where he graduated with a Bachelor of Medicine (M.B.) in 1975 and a Master of Public Health (M.P.H.) in 1977. He then pursued graduate studies in the United States at Harvard University, where he earned a Master of Science (M.S.) in epidemiology from the Harvard School of Public Health in 1981.

== Political career ==
Yeh served as deputy mayor of Taipei under Ma Ying-jeou, and was named a deputy secretary general of the presidential office at the start of Ma's first presidential term in 2008. He later replaced Lin Fang-yue as health minister in September 2008. In May 2009, the 2009 flu pandemic reached Taiwan. Before it abated, Yeh resigned his position on 3 August to run for the Hualien County magistracy, but lost a primary to Tu Li-hua.

In 2014, he was selected to lead a committee that explored possible changes to the National Health Insurance program. Yeh later chaired the Taiwan Blood Services Foundation, resigning the position in 2017.
