= Yaung Chih-liang =

Taiwanese physician (born 1946)

- 楊志良
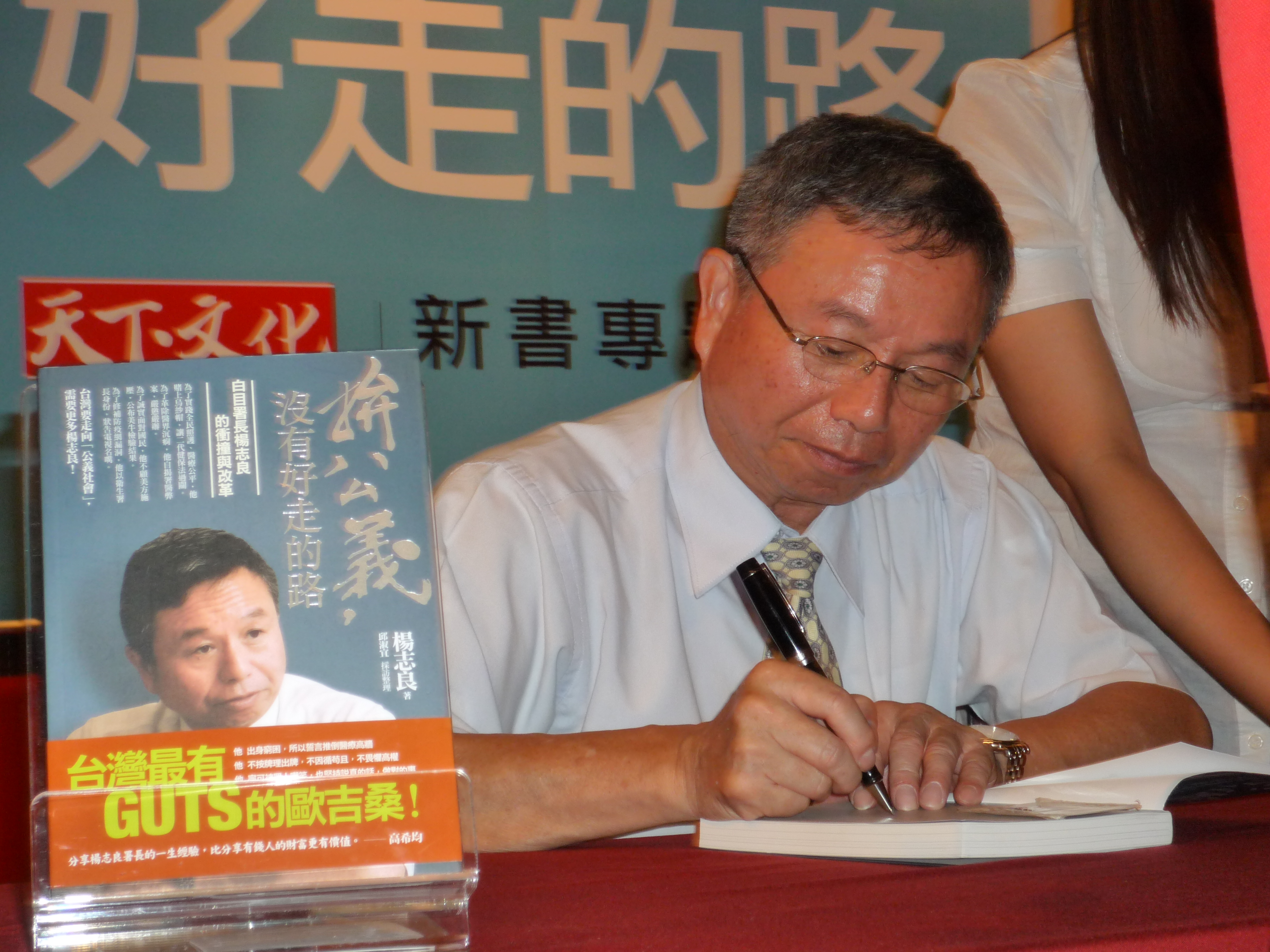

13th Minister of the Department of Health
- In office 6 August 2009 – 8 February 2011
- Preceded by: Yeh Ching-chuan
- Succeeded by: Chiu Wen-ta

Personal details
- Born: 11 March 1946 (age 80) Taipei, Taiwan
- Party: Kuomintang
- Education: National Taiwan Normal University (MB); National Taiwan University (MPH); University of Michigan (PhD)

Yaung Chih-liang (Chinese: 楊志良; pinyin: Yáng Zhìliáng; born 11 March 1946) is a Taiwanese physician and public health specialist. He was the Minister of the Department of Health of the Executive Yuan from 2009 to 2011.

== Education ==
Yaung graduated from National Taiwan Normal University with a Bachelor of Medicine (M.B.) in health promotion and health education. He attended medical school at National Taiwan University, obtaining a Master of Public Health (M.P.H.), then pursued doctoral studies in the United States at the University of Michigan, where he earned his Ph.D. in population studies in 1979.

As a graduate student in Michigan, Yaung's studies were financed by the Population Council. His doctoral dissertation was titled, "Development Strategy, Relative Deprivation, and Fertility Behavior in Taiwan" and was completed under professors Yuzuru Takeshita, Albert Hermalin, Timothy Johnson, and George Simmons.
