= Clouding agent =

Food additive

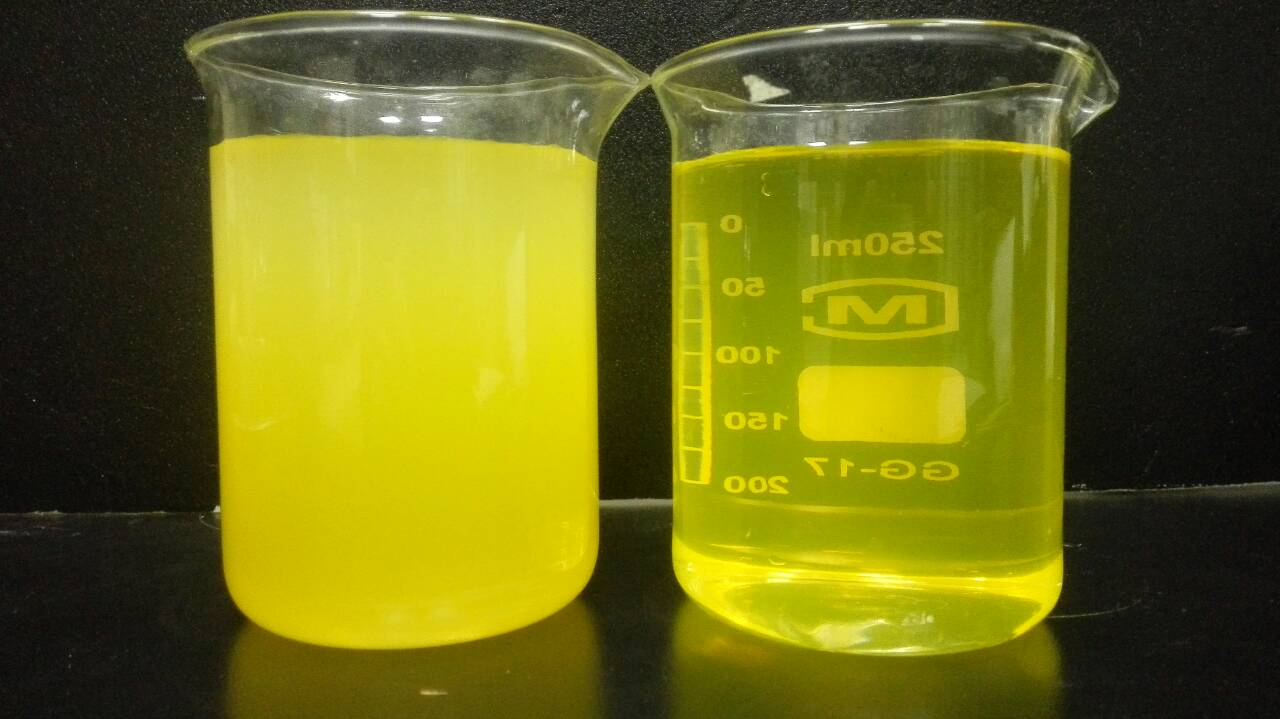
Cloudy agent could provide the desired opacity of natural juice.

Clouding agents or cloudifiers are a type of food additive used to make beverages such as fruit juices to look more cloudy, and thus more natural-looking and visually appealing, typically by creating an emulsion of oil droplets.

Natural fruit juices are often opalescent, due to protein, oil or pectin particles from plant cell fragments. To mimic this visual effect in low-juice content soft drinks, a clouding agent is added. Common clouding agents include palm oil, Arabic gum and extracts of citrus fruits, and titanium dioxide may be used to enhance their color strength. The illegal use of the plasticizer DEHP in clouding agents was reported in Taiwan in 2011.
