= Lin Tzou-yien =

Taiwanese physician

- 林奏延
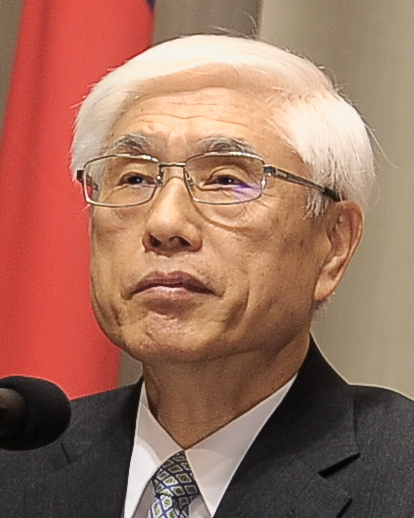

Minister of Health and Welfare of the Republic of China
- In office 20 May 2016 – 7 February 2017
- Deputy: Lu Pau-ching, Ho Chi-kung
- Vice: Shiu Ming-neng; Tsai Sen-tien
- Preceded by: Chiang Been-huang
- Succeeded by: Chen Shih-chung
- In office 3 October 2014 – 22 October 2014 (acting)
- Deputy: Tseng Chung-ming
- Vice: Shiu Ming-neng
- Preceded by: Chiu Wen-ta
- Succeeded by: Chiang Been-huang

Deputy Minister of Health and Welfare of the Republic of China
- In office 22 October 2014 – 20 May 2016
- Minister: Chiang Been-huang
- Deputy: Tseng Chung-ming
- Vice: Shiu Ming-neng
- In office 2011 – 3 October 2014
- Minister: Chiu Wen-ta
- Vice: Shiu Ming-neng

Personal details
- Born: 28 October 1948 (age 77) Taiwan
- Education: Taipei Medical College (MD); University of Buffalo; University of Texas Health Science Center at Dallas

Lin Tzou-yien (Chinese: 林奏延; pinyin: Lín Zòuyán; born 28 October 1948) is a Taiwanese physician. He was the deputy Minister of Health and Welfare and served as acting Minister in October 2014 upon the resignation of Chiu Wen-ta. Upon the appointment of Chiang Been-huang, Lin returned to his previous post until he was promoted again to head the ministry as part of Lin Chuan's incoming cabinet, which took office on 20 May 2016. Lin was succeeded in office by Chen Shih-chung on 7 February 2017.

== Education and medical career ==
Lin earned his Doctor of Medicine (M.D.) from Taipei Medical College in 1973 and spent the 1980s abroad in the United States, serving fellowships at the State University of New York at Buffalo and the University of Texas Health Science Center at Dallas. In 1984, he returned to Taiwan and began working for the Chang Gung hospital system. He was the superintendent of Chang Gung Children's Hospital until 2011.

== ROC Department of Health Ministry ==
Later that year, Lin began working as a deputy minister of the Department of Health.

In early April 2013 during the H7N9 flu virus outbreak, Lin gave a statement that expressed confidence in Taiwan's ability to develop its own vaccine against the virus without any collaboration with Mainland China. Speaking at the Central Epidemic Command Center, he further added that the ROC government had prepared a team to produce the vaccine with the collaboration with local manufacturers.

After head health minister Chiu Wen-ta resigned on 3 October 2014 to take responsibility for a food scandal involving tainted oil, Lin was named acting minister. He was subsequently replaced by Chiang Been-huang on 22 October. On 7 April 2016, Tsai Ing-wen's designated premier Lin Chuan named Lin Tzou-yien the next leader of the health ministry. He took office on 20 May 2016.

At the World Health Assembly On 25 May 2016 in Geneva, Switzerland, Lin delivered the 5-minute speech representing Chinese Taipei. He called for the sound participation of Chinese Taipei in World Health Organization. The speech was delivered fully in English without mentioning the word Taiwan, although at one point he was referring to the "Taiwanese population".
