= Lin Fang-yue =

Taiwanese cardiologist, hospital superintendent, and health minister

Lin Fang-Yue
- 林芳郁

11th Minister of Department of Health of the Republic of China
- In office 20 May 2008 – 25 September 2008
- Preceded by: Hou Sheng-mao
- Succeeded by: Yeh Ching-chuan

Personal details
- Education: National Taiwan University (MD, PhD)

Lin Fang-yue (Chinese: 林芳郁; pinyin: Lín Fāngyù) is a Taiwanese cardiovascular surgeon, hospital superintendent, professor, and former health minister.

== Education ==
Lin attended medical school at National Taiwan University, where he earned his Doctor of Medicine (M.D.) and, in 1989, his Ph.D. in clinical medicine as a student at the NTU Clinical Research Institute. His doctoral dissertation, completed under Professor Yang Wan-fa, was titled, "A study of bicaval inflow occlusion" (Chinese: 入流阻斷術之研究).

== Career ==
After graduation, Lin was a cardiovascular surgeon at National Taiwan University Hospital and later became its superintendent. He served as the hospital's 11th superintendent until May 20, 2008. He also taught and published as a professor at National Taiwan University's medical school.

=== Department of Health minister ===
In May 2008, Lin took office as the minister of the Department of Health for Taiwan. The China Post reported that as a former high school classmate of President Ma Ying-jeou (馬英九), he was persuaded to join the cabinet "for old time's sake" and to help with the National Health Insurance system's financial difficulties, while pledging that the department had no immediate plans to increase premiums. At the time of his inauguration, he had the highest public support of any cabinet member.

During an outbreak of enterovirus in June 2008, Lin said it “was out of control and all we can do is pray,” a remark that he later apologized for. Several members of the Democratic Progressive Party (DPP) criticized him for his handling of the epidemic, among them caucus whip Yeh Yi-ching (葉宜津) who called for Lin's resignation.

In September, in response to the 2008 Chinese milk scandal, Taiwan had banned the importation of milk products from mainland China when some were found contaminated with melamine. But on September 24, Lin's DOH, following standards in other countries like the United States, cleared milk products for sale that had trace amounts of the industrial chemical. That change in policy met with criticism from the DPP and public protests. Lin resigned two days later, saying, "The Department of Health's decision, made for efficiency's sake, caused misunderstandings and shattered consumer confidence. I should take responsibility." Serving for only 128 days, he had the shortest tenure of any cabinet member since Liu Chao-shiuan (劉兆玄) became premier.

=== Return to hospital administration ===
In January 2009, The Taipei Times reported that Lin had been appointed to head the Taipei Veterans General Hospital, and would be the first superintendent in its 50-year history never to have previously worked there. Current and former staff criticized Lin's appointment to head the hospital, saying it was politically motivated. Lin's successor at the Department of Health, Yeh Ching-chuan (葉金川), denied that accusation, and saying that President Ma was not part of the decision to appoint Lin. Lin was inaugurated as the hospital's eighth superintendent on January 16, 2009, where he served until January 2015.

From 2015 to 2021, Lin was president of the Far Eastern Memorial Hospital.

== Personal life ==
Lin is married to his wife, Lin Ching-yun(林靜芸), a celebrity cosmetic surgeon and the founder of Jean's Clinic of Plastic Surgery.

== Medical publications ==
- Hsu, Ron-Bin; Yue, Lin (2008). "Nontyphoid Salmonella Infection in Heart Transplant Recipients". The American Journal of the Medical Sciences. 336 (5): 393–6. doi:10.1097/MAJ.0b013e31816a8973. PMID 19011395.
- Chen, YC; Chang, SC; Tsai, KS; Lin, FY (2008). "Certainties and uncertainties facing emerging respiratory infectious diseases: lessons from SARS". J Formos Med Assoc. 107 (6): 432–42. doi:10.1016/S0929-6646(08)60150-3. PMC 7135137. PMID 18583213.
- Chiang, Chi Huei & Yue, Lin. (2010). Principles of Pulmonary Protection During Heart Surgery. 10.1007/978-1-84996-308-4_47.
- Other medical publications
