= Shiu Ming-neng =

Taiwanese physician and epidemiologist

- 許銘能

Vice Minister of Health and Welfare of the Republic of China
- In office 23 July 2013 – June 2016
- Minister: Chiu Wen-ta; Lin Tzou-yien (acting); Chiang Been-huang; Lin Tzou-yien
- Deputy: Lin Tzou-yien, Tseng Chung-ming; Tseng Chung-ming; Lin Tzou-yien, Tseng Chung-ming; Lu Pau-ching, Ho Chi-kung
- Succeeded by: Tsai Sen-tien

Deputy Minister of Department of Health of the Republic of China
- In office May 2013 – 22 July 2013
- Minister: Chiu Wen-ta

Personal details
- Education: National Taiwan University (BS, MPH, PhD); National Yang-Ming University (MB)

Shiu Ming-neng (traditional Chinese: 許銘能; simplified Chinese: 许铭能; pinyin: Xǔ Míngnéng) is a Taiwanese physician and epidemiologist. He was the Vice Minister of Health and Welfare in the Executive Yuan from 2013 to 2016.

== Education ==
Shiu graduated from National Taiwan University (NTU) with a bachelor's degree in pharmacy in 1983 and earned a Bachelor of Medicine (M.B.) from National Yang-Ming University in 1990. He then returned to NTU and earned a Master of Public Health (M.P.H.) in 1998 and his Ph.D. in epidemiology from the university in 2002. His master's thesis was titled, "A study on the natural history of oral leukoplakia and oral cancer" (Chinese: 口腔白斑及口腔癌自然病史之探討). His doctoral dissertation was titled, "Oral leukoplakia and oral cancer: Natural history patterns and screening evaluation".
