= Chiang Been-huang =

Taiwanese food scientist

- 蔣丙煌
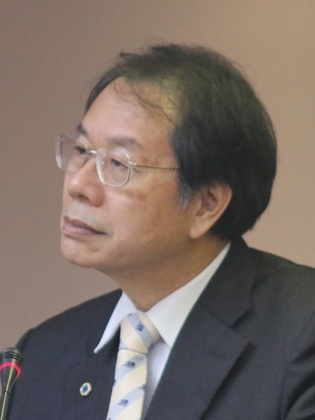

Minister of Health and Welfare of the Republic of China
- In office 22 October 2014 – 20 May 2016
- Deputy: Lin Tzou-yien, Tseng Chung-ming
- Vice: Shiu Ming-neng
- Preceded by: Chiu Wen-ta; Lin Tzou-yien (acting)
- Succeeded by: Lin Tzou-yien

Minister without Portfolio of the Executive Yuan
- In office 3 March 2014 – 2014
- Preceded by: Chang San-cheng

Personal details
- Born: 1952 (age 73–74)
- Education: Fu-Jen Catholic University (BS); University of Illinois at Urbana-Champaign (MS, PhD)

Chiang Been-huang (Chinese: 蔣丙煌; pinyin: Jiǎng Bǐnghuáng) is a Taiwanese food scientist. He served as the Minister of Health and Welfare from 22 October 2014 to 20 May 2016.

== Education ==
Chiang graduated from Fu-Jen Catholic University with a Bachelor of Science (B.S.) in biology in 1975. He then completed graduate studies in the United States at the University of Illinois Urbana-Champaign, where he earned a Master of Science (M.S.) in meat science in 1979 and his Ph.D. in food science and food chemistry in 1983. His doctoral dissertation was titled, "Process Engineering Characteristics of the Hollow Fiber Ultrafiltration of Skimmilk," and was completed under professors Munir Cheryan and Robert McL. Whitney.

== Early career ==
He had been a lecturer and associate professor of the Institute of Food Science and Technology at National Taiwan University (NTU) in 1983-1988 and has become a professor since then. He became the director of the institute in 1991-1997 and also the dean of the College of Bioresources and Agriculture of NTU in 2004–2005.

== Minister without Portfolio ==
Chiang was named the Minister without Portfolio in February 2014 and took office a month later. He was assigned to oversee the health and welfare-related affairs, including disease prevention and control, medicine, sanitation and national food safety policies.

== Minister of Health and Welfare ==
=== Ministry appointment ===
On 17 October 2014, the Executive Yuan announced the appointment of Chiang to the post of Minister of Health and Welfare after the resignation of Chiu Wen-ta due to the food scandal involving adulterated cooking oil in early September 2014. Upon his appointment, Chiang said that he would give all of his best while serving the public and that he felt confident to solve the ongoing oil scandal in Taiwan within a month to gain public trust in Taiwanese food safety. Chiang has four policies in dealing with the oil scandal, which are to reinforce the management of food sources, to set up a three-level quality control system, to utilize information communication technology in integrating food management and to diversify the management of different oil products. Chiang was sworn in on 22 October 2014.

== See also ==
- Executive Yuan
