= National Health Research Institutes =

Taiwanese research foundation

- 國家衛生研究院

Agency overview
- Formed: 1995
- Jurisdiction: Taiwan
- Headquarters: Zhunan, Miaoli County
- Agency executive: Hsing-Jien Kung, President
- Website: www.nhri.org.tw

The National Health Research Institutes (NHRI; Chinese: 國家衛生研究院; pinyin: Guójiā Wèishēng Yánjiùyuàn) in Zhunan Township, Miaoli County, Taiwan, is a non-profit foundation dedicated to medical research and improved healthcare in Taiwan. Established by the Taiwan government in 1995, NHRI is under the supervision of the Ministry of Health and Welfare.

== Organisation ==
NHRI currently has 11 research units:

=== Research Units ===
- National Institute of Cancer Research
- Taiwan Cooperative Oncology Group, TCOG
- Institute of Cellular and System Medicine
- Institute of Population Health Sciences
- Institute of Biotechnology and Pharmaceutical Research
- Institute of Molecular and Genomic Medicine
- National Institute of Infectious Diseases and Vaccinology
- National Institute of Environmental Health Sciences
- Institute of Biomedical Engineering and Nanomedicine
- Immunology Research Center
- Center for Neuropsychiatric Research

== Cooperation ==
The NHRI is a member of the World Federation for Culture Collections (WFCC) and the Asian Consortium for the Conservation and Sustainable Use of Microbial Resources (ACM).

== See also ==
- Ministry of Health and Welfare (Taiwan)
- Healthcare in Taiwan
