= Chiu Wen-ta =

Taiwanese physician and neuroscientist

- 邱文達
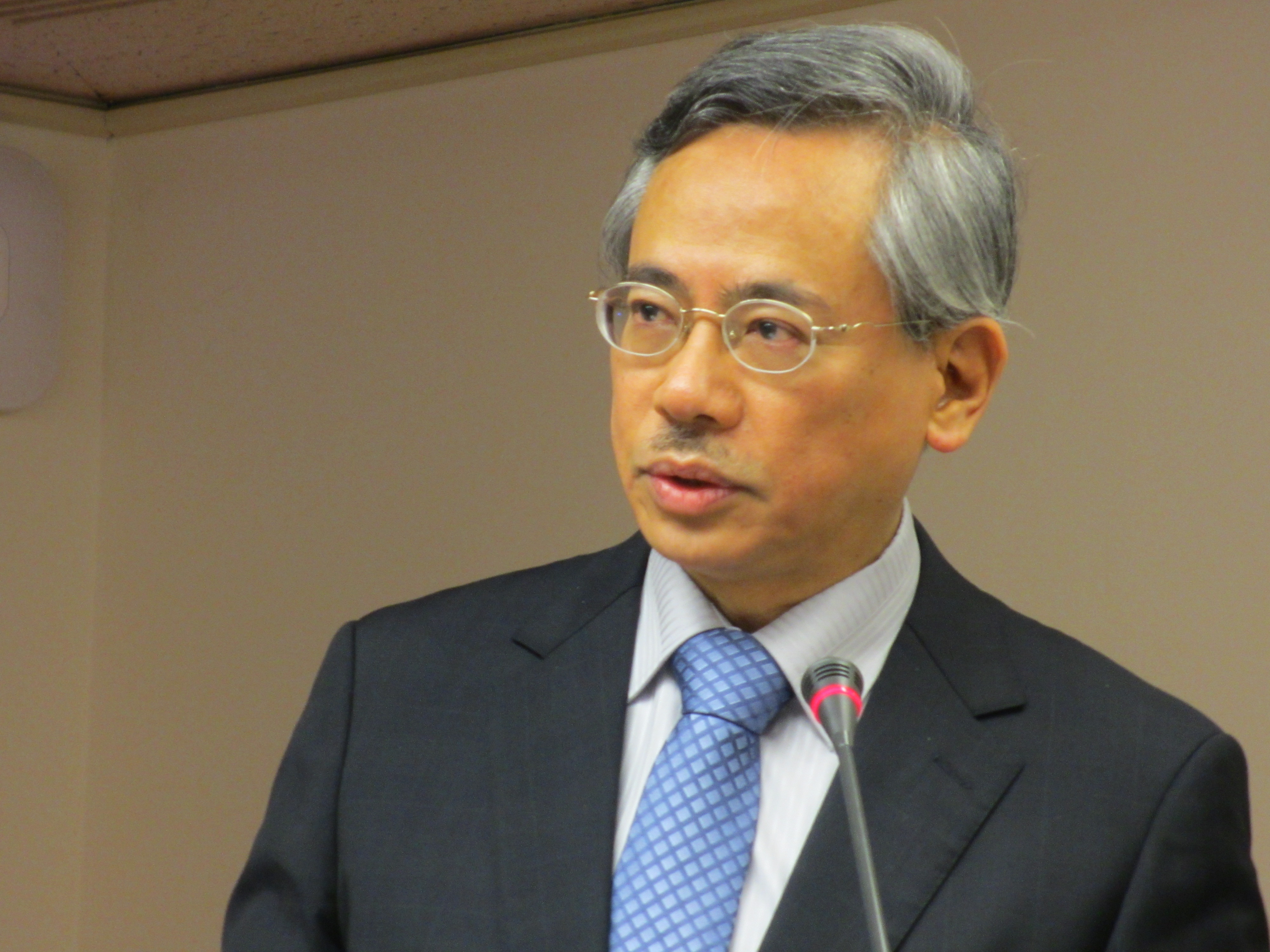

Minister of Health and Welfare of the Republic of China
- In office 23 July 2013 – 3 October 2014
- Deputy: Lin Tzou-yien, Tseng Chung-ming
- Vice: Shiu Ming-neng
- Preceded by: Himself as the Minister of Department of Health
- Succeeded by: Lin Tzou-yien (acting); Chiang Been-huang

Minister of Department of Health of the Republic of China
- In office 8 February 2011 – 22 July 2013
- Deputy: Lin Tzou-yien, Tseng Chung-ming, Shiu Ming-neng
- Preceded by: Yang Chih-liang
- Succeeded by: Himself as Minister of Health and Welfare

Personal details
- Born: 21 July 1950 (age 75) Miaoli County, Taiwan
- Education: Chung Shan Medical University (MD); Stanford University; University of Pittsburgh (MPH, PhD); Nihon University (DSc)

Chiu Wen-ta (Chinese: 邱文達; pinyin: Qiū Wéndá; born 21 July 1950) is a Taiwanese physician, public health specialist, and neuroscientist. He was the Minister of Health and Welfare (formerly the Minister of the Department of Health) of the Executive Yuan from 2011 to 2014.

== Education ==
Chiu studied medicine at Chung Shan Medical University in 1970 and graduated with a Doctor of Medicine (M.D.) in 1975. In 1986, Chiu spent a year as a research fellow at Stanford University. He then completed graduate studies at the University of Pittsburgh, where he earned a Master of Public Health (M.P.H.) and his Ph.D. in public health in 1989 from the University of Pittsburgh Graduate School of Public Health. His doctoral dissertation was titled, "The epidemiology of head injury in Hualien County". In 1991, he earned a second doctorate, a Doctor of Science (D.Sc.) in neuroscience, from Nihon University in Japan.

== Early career ==
Prior to joining politics, Chiu had served extensively at the Taipei Medical University. He began his career in 1985 as a lecturer, associate professor and end up as professor of the School of Medicine. In 1993, he became the dean of the School of Public Health and administrative deputy superintendent at the Taipei Medical University Hospital. In 1997, he became the superintendent of the university's Wan Fang Hospital. In 2000, he became the dean of the Graduate Institute of Injury Prevention and Control and the vice principal in 2004. In 2008 he became the superintendent of the university's Shuang Ho Hospital as well as principal of the university.

== ROC Department of Health Ministry ==
=== 2013 H7N9 flu virus outbreak ===
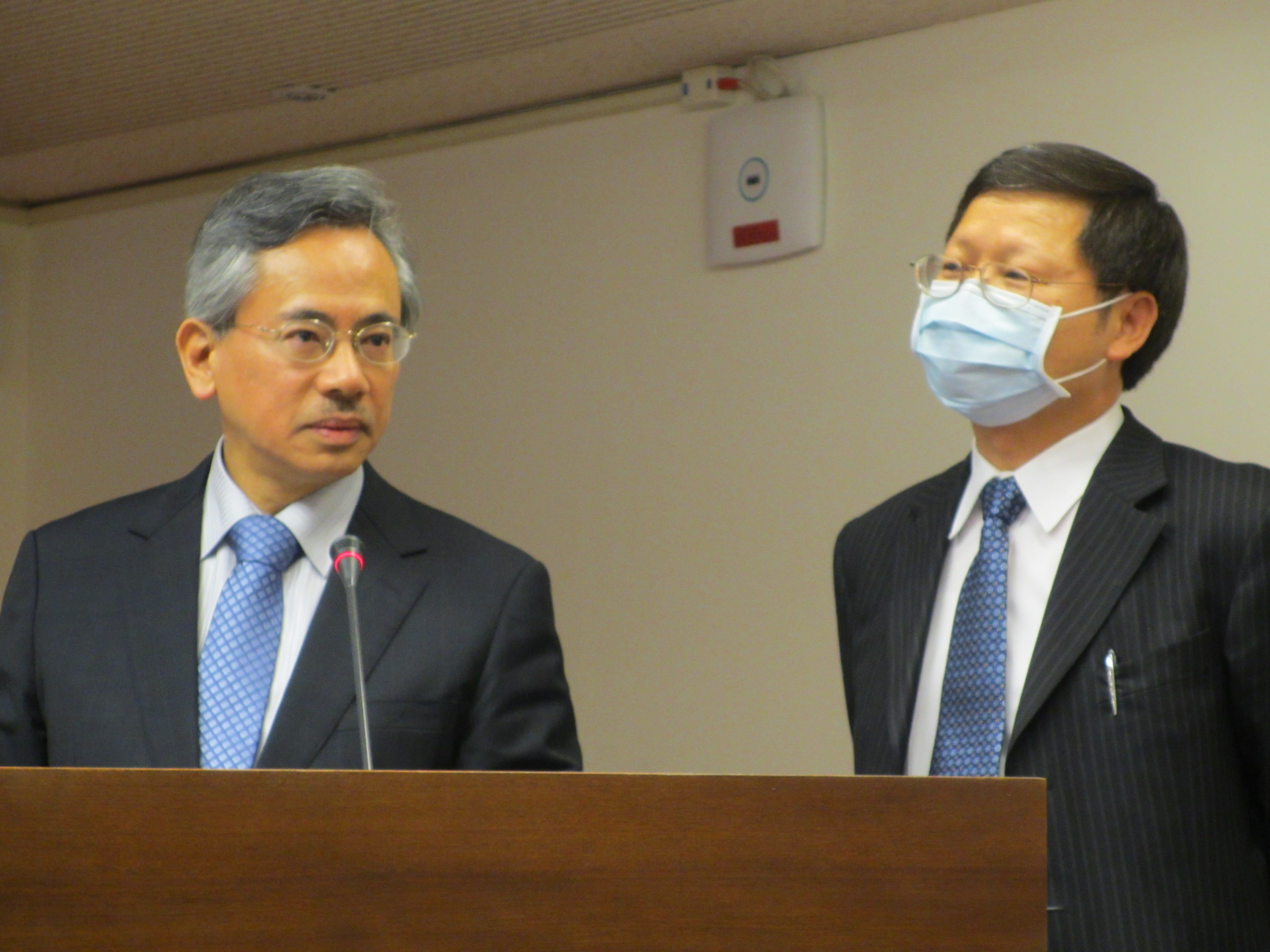
Chiu during the 2013 H7N9 flu virus outbreak.

In early April 2013 during the H7N9 flu virus outbreak, Chiu gave a statement on behalf of the ROC Department of Health that they have classified H7N9 virus as category five notifiable disease. He also added that the department will raise the quarantine alert of the virus from Grade 2 to Grade 3. He also appointed Chang Feng-yee (張峰義) as the Director-General of the Centers for Disease Control.

== ROC Health and Welfare Ministry ==
=== Ministry of Health and Welfare renaming from Department of Health ===
During the opening ceremony of the newly renamed Ministry of Health and Welfare from Department of Health on 23 July 2013, Chiu said that he looks forward for a society free from poverty and illness, and to foster maximum well-being of the Taiwanese people.

=== Chang Chi Foodstuff Factory Co cooking oil scandal ===
Responding to the scandal regarding the adulterating and mislabeling of cooking oil made by Chang Chi Foodstuff Factory Co. in October 2013, Chiu said that he will take full responsibility for cracking down on the 'black-hearted' food suppliers.

=== Resignation ===
Chiu resigned from his ministerial position on 3 October 2014 as a political responsibility due to the tainted lard oil scandal that had hit Taiwanese food industry which began in early September 2014. He ensured that there were no longer substandard lard oil products on shelves in Taiwan and that all of the responsible parties had been handed over to the prosecutor's office. He announced his resignation during a press conference at 8:00 p.m. held by the Ministry of Health and Welfare. Chiu said that he would return to his previous neurological research field.
