= Food and Drug Administration (Taiwan) =

Taiwan government agency

- 食品藥物管理署
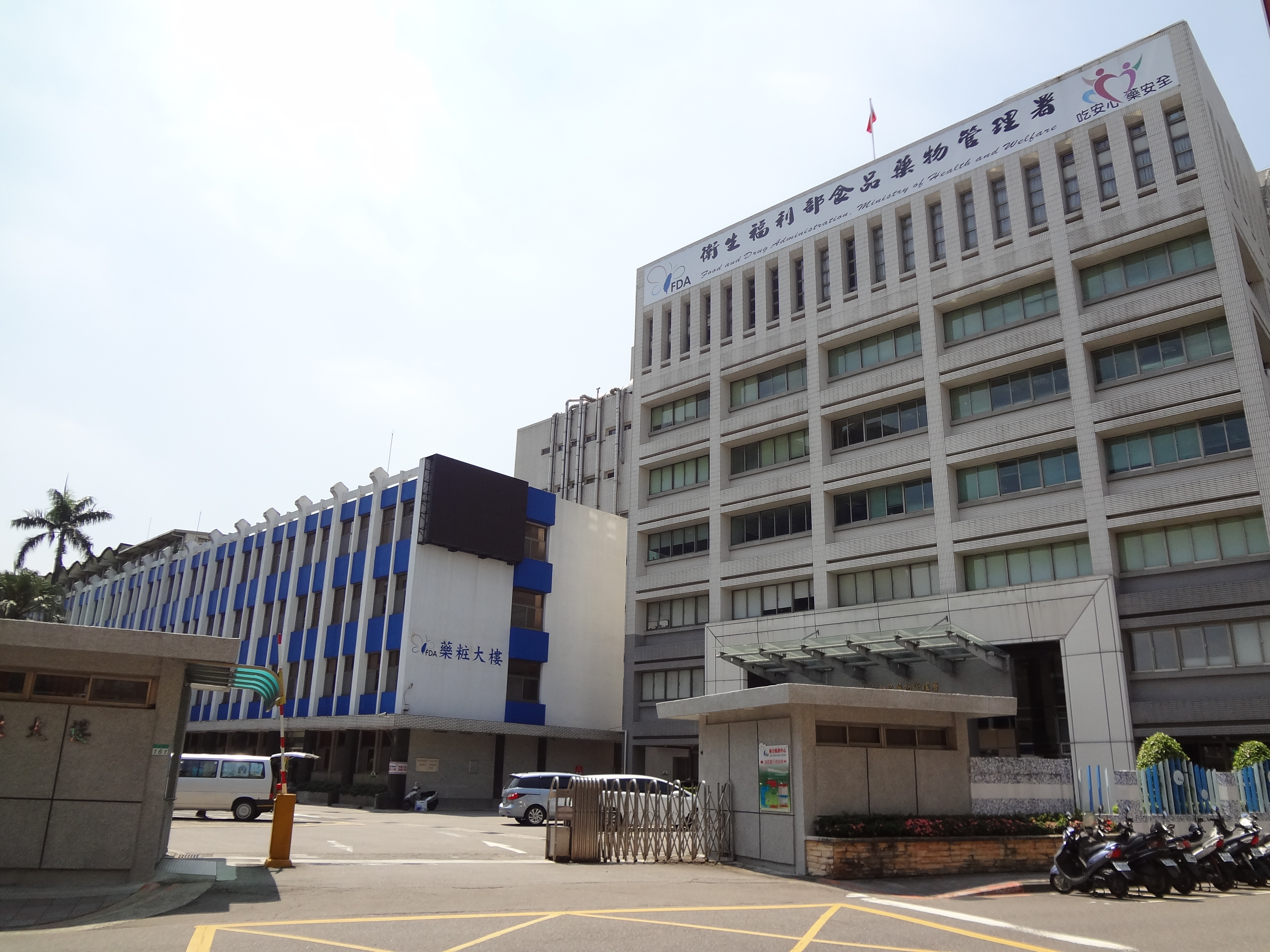

Agency overview
- Formed: 1 January 2010
- Preceding agency: Bureau of Food Safety, Bureau of Pharmaceutical Affairs, Bureau of Food and Drug Analysis, Bureau of Controlled Drugs
- Jurisdiction: Republic of China, Taiwan
- Headquarters: Nangang, Taipei, Taiwan, Republic of China
- Employees: 1001 - 5000
- Agency executive: Chiang Chih-kang, Director General
- Parent agency: Ministry of Health and Welfare
- Website: www.fda.gov.tw

The Food and Drug Administration (TFDA; Chinese: 食品藥物管理署) is an agency of the Ministry of Health and Welfare of Taiwan. It is responsible for ensuring the safety and quality of food, pharmaceutical drugs, medical devices. It focuses on bolstering legal standards and registration mechanisms; strengthening supervision of food businesses; monitoring supply chains; increasing the capacity and capabilities of related national laboratories; and enhancing risk management mechanisms. In addition to facilitating the development of biotechnology and pharmaceutical industries, the TFDA also promotes international cooperation and information exchange.

The TFDA is a regulatory member of the International Council for Harmonisation of Technical Requirements for Pharmaceuticals for Human Use.

The TFDA is headed by the director general, who reports to the minister of health and welfare. The current director general is Chiang Chih-kang.

== History ==
On 3 June 2009, the Food and Drug Administration Organization Act was promulgated. On 1 January 2010, the Bureau of Food Safety, Bureau of Pharmaceutical Affairs, Bureau of Food and Drug Analysis and Bureau of Controlled Drugs were merged to form the Taiwan Food and Drug Administration. On 23 July 2013, the agency was placed under the Ministry of Health and Welfare.

== Regulation ==
The programs for safety regulation within the Taiwan Food and Drug Administration falls under the jurisdiction of the Operational Division of the (TFDA). Within this division, there are seven separate departments, four of which are focused on safety regulation for their specific product categories. the first department is the Food Safety department, whose primary goal is to maintain public confidence in food sanitation by reviewing and revising laws relating to food sanitation and safety management. The second department is the Medicinal Products department, whose primary goal is the life cycle management of medicinal products mainly consisting of pre-release testing and approval, and after-release safety and quality testing. The third department is the Controlled Drugs department, whose primary goal is the management of addictive substances, and the prevention and reduction of drug abuse utilizing the Controlled Drugs Act. The fourth department is the Medical Devices & Cosmetics department whose primary goal is The life cycle management of medical devices and cosmetics mainly consisting of pre-release testing and approval, and after-release quality surveillance and insurance.

== Organizational structure ==
- Director General
  - Deputy Director General
    - Chief Secretary
      - Administrative Office
        - Secretariat
        - Personnel
        - Accounting
        - Service Ethics
        - Information Management
      - Center of Regional Administration
        - Northern Office
        - Central Office
        - Southern Office
      - Operational Division
        - Planning & Research Development
        - Food Safety
        - Medicinal Products
        - Medical Devices & Cosmetics
        - Controlled Drugs
        - Research & Analysis
        - Quality Compliance and Management
      - Task Force
        - Factory for Controlled Drugs
        - Decision Support Center
        - Parliament and Media Affairs Center
      - Collaborative Institute
        - Center for Drug Evaluation (CDE)
        - Taiwan Drug Relief Foundation (TDRF)
