= Ministry of Health and Welfare (Taiwan) =

Government ministry

- 衛生福利部; Wèishēng Fúlì Bù (Mandarin); Ví-sên Fuk-li Phu (Hakka)

- Seal of the Ministry of Health and Welfare (衛生福利部印)

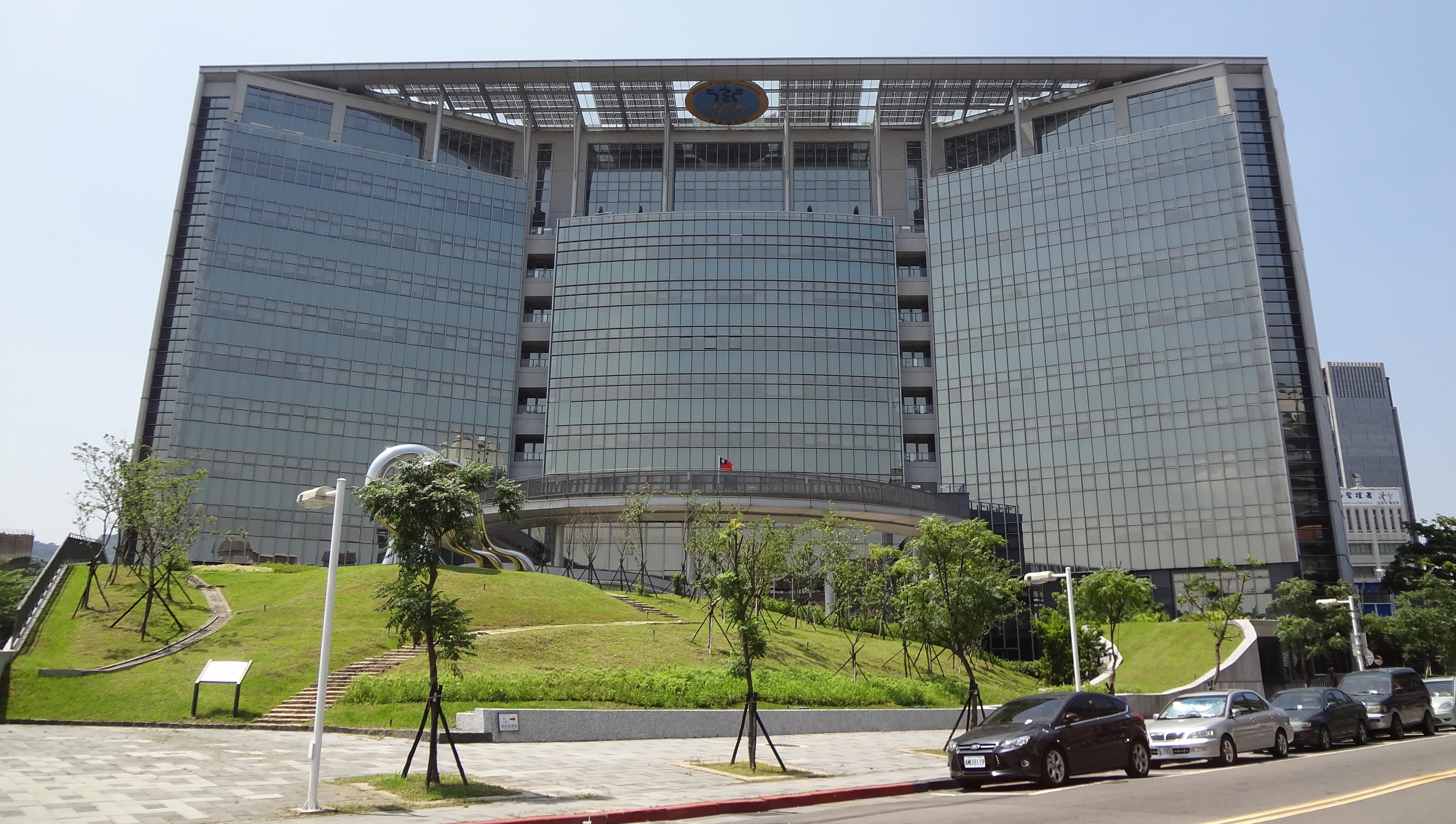
- Headquarters in Taipei

Agency overview
- Formed: 17 March 1971 (as Department of Health); 23 July 2013 (as MOHW)
- Preceding agency: Department of Health
- Jurisdiction: Taiwan
- Headquarters: Taipei
- Minister responsible: Shih Chung-liang
- Deputy Minister responsible: Chuang Jen-hsiang
- Website: www.mohw.gov.tw

The Ministry of Health and Welfare (MOHW; Chinese: 衛生福利部; pinyin: Wèishēng Fúlì Bù; Pe̍h-ōe-jī: Ōe-seng Hok-lī Pō͘) is the Executive Yuan ministry responsible for the administration of the public health system, social welfare, affordable and universal health care, hospitals, pharmaceutical, immunization programs, disease prevention, supervision and coordination of local health agencies in Taiwan.

== History ==
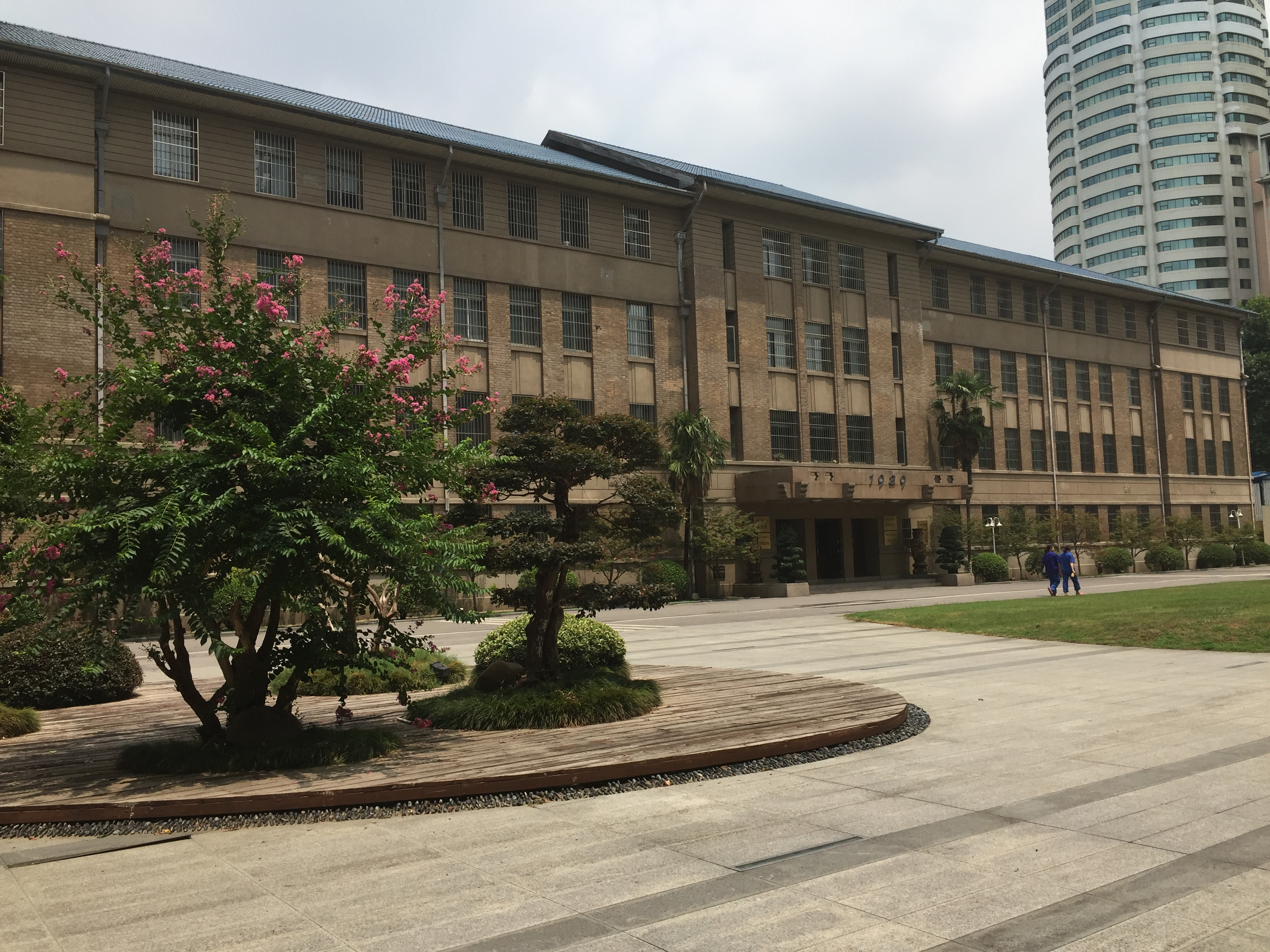
Former Ministry of Health and Welfare building in Nanjing.

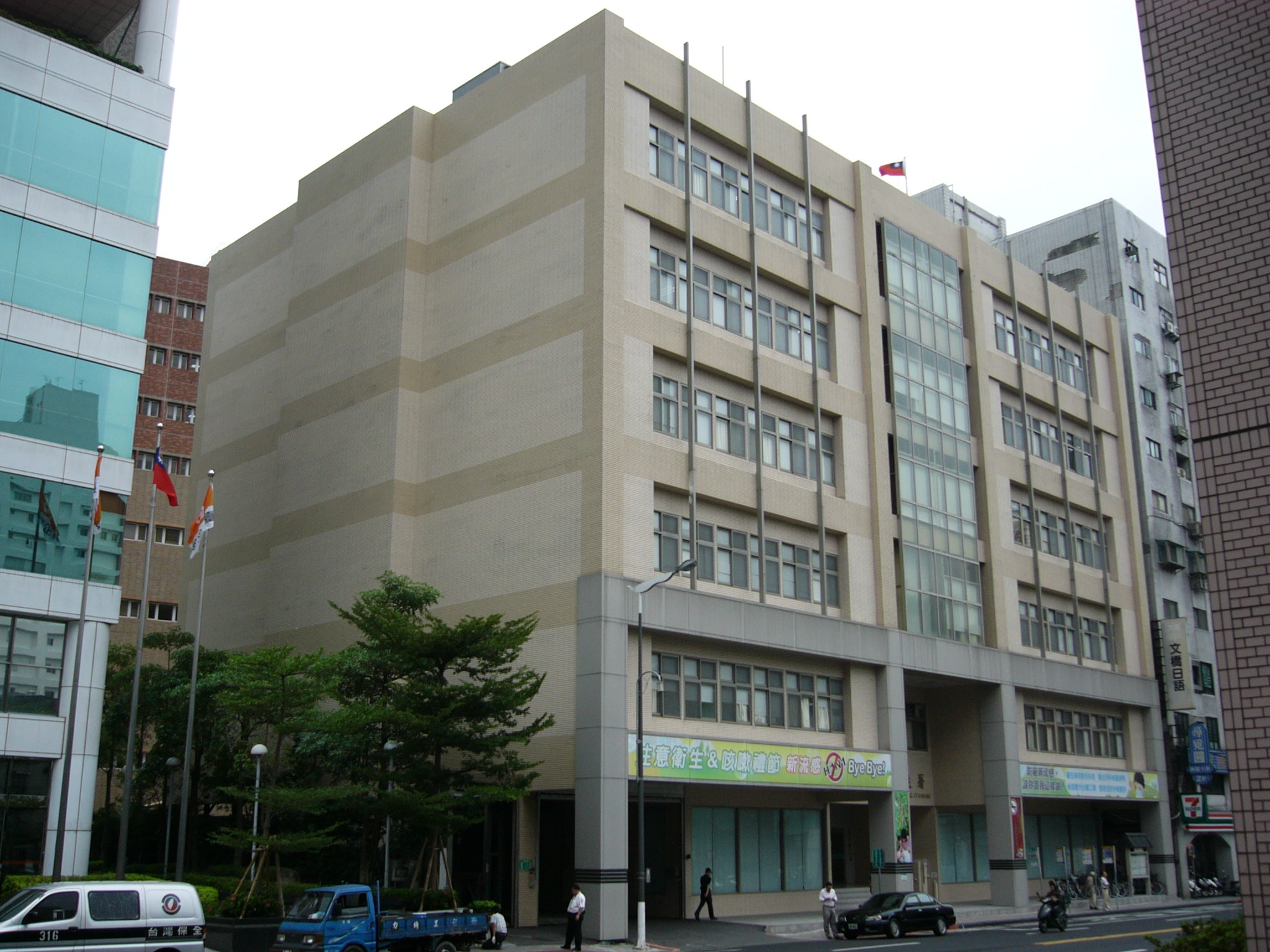
Former Ministry of Health and Welfare building in Taipei (until 2014).

The ministry was originally established on 17 March 1971 as the Department of Health (DOH; Chinese: 衛生署; pinyin: Wèishēng Shǔ; Pe̍h-ōe-jī: Ōe-seng Sú). The department was upgraded to Ministry of Health and Welfare on 23 July 2013 with the addition from the agencies in the Ministry of the Interior responsible for social welfare following restructuring of the Executive Yuan.

The original building of the MOHW was located at Datong District, Taipei when it was still named the Department of Health and being renamed Ministry of Health and Welfare. The Executive Yuan approved the construction for the new building of the then Department of Health in 2007 at Nangang District, Taipei. After years of planning and construction, the building was finally completed in May 2014. On 18 June 2014, the opening ceremony of the new MOHW building was attended by President Ma Ying-jeou, legislators, and representatives from various government agencies and related organizations.

In 2023 the Ministry of National Defense and Ministry of Health and Welfare set up a reserve system for medical personnel.

== Organizational structure ==
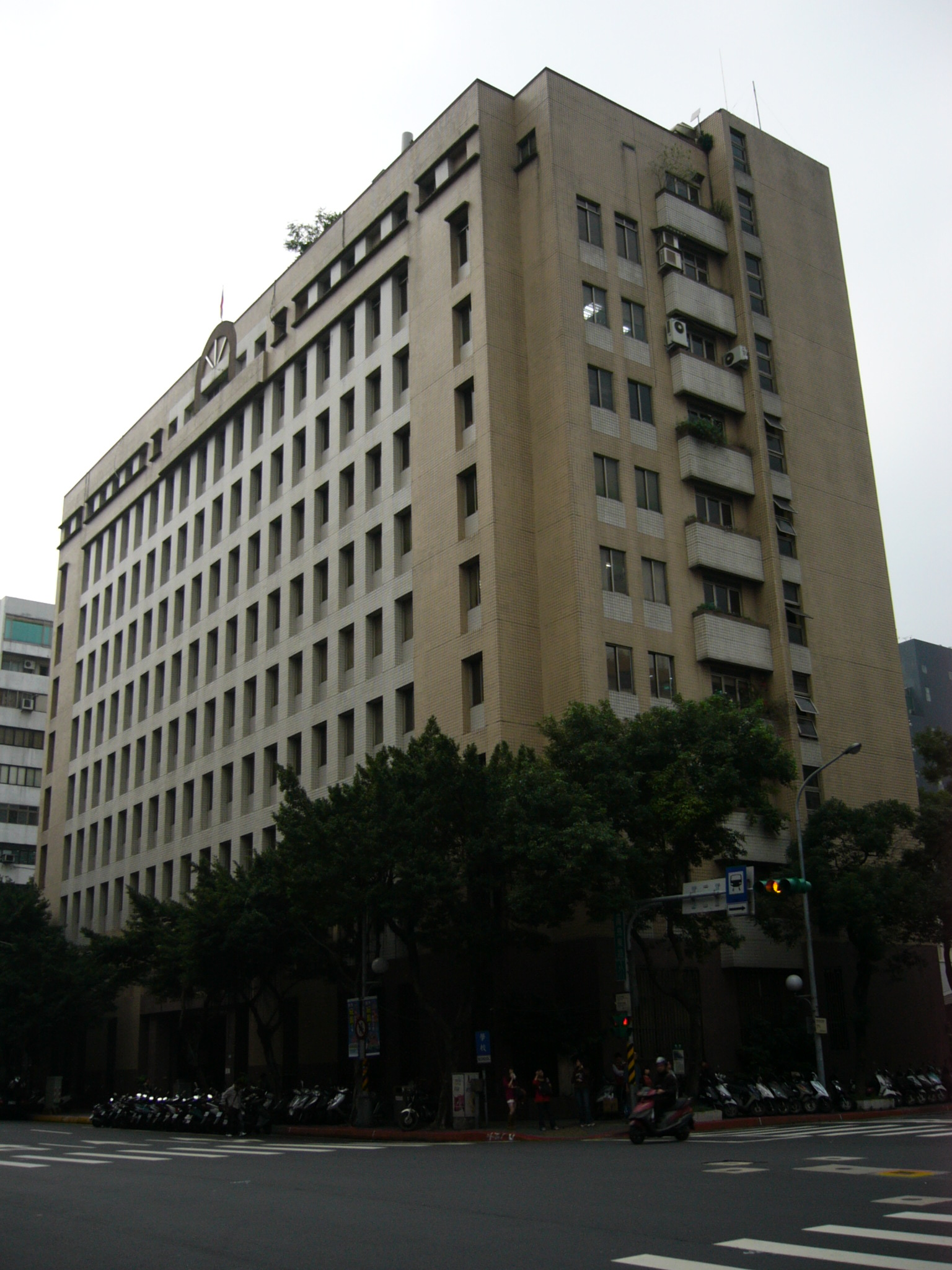
Centers for Disease Control

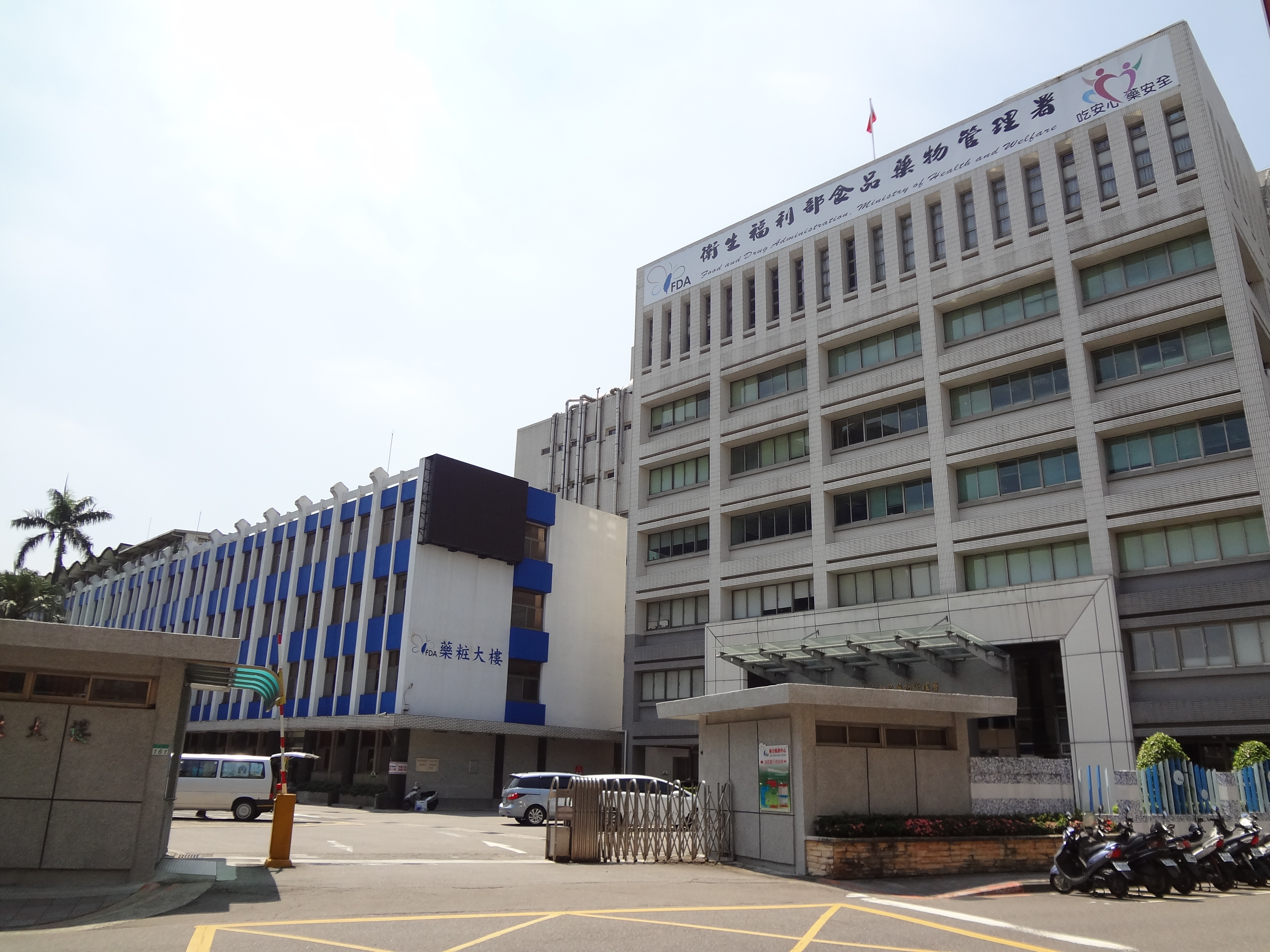
Food and Drug Administration

=== Political departments ===
- Department of Planning
- Department of Social Insurance
- Department of Social Assistance and Social Work
- Department of Protective Service
- Department of Nursing and Health Care
- Department of Medical Affairs
- Department of Mental Health
- Department of Oral Health
- Department of Chinese Medicine and Pharmacy

=== Administrative departments ===
- Department of Secretarial Affairs
- Department of Personnel
- Department of Civil Service Ethics
- Department of Accounting
- Department of Statistics
- Department of Information Management
- Legal Affairs Committee
- Hospital and Social Welfare Organizations Administration Commission
- National Health Insurance Administration
- National Health Insurance Dispute Mediation Committee
- Health and Welfare Workers Training Center
- Office of International Cooperation
- National Pension Supervisory Committee

=== Agencies ===
- Social and Family Affairs Administration
- Centers for Disease Control
- Food and Drug Administration
- Health Promotion Administration
- National Health Insurance Administration

== List of ministers ==
Kuomintang Democratic Progressive Party Non-partisan/ unknown

№	Name	Term of office		Days	Party	Premier
Minister of the Department of Health
1	Yen Chun-hui (顏春輝)	17 March 1971	25 June 1974	1196		Yen Chia-kan; Chiang Ching-kuo
2	Wang Chin-mao (王金茂)	25 June 1974	9 May 1981	2510		Chiang Ching-kuo; Sun Yun-suan
3	Hsu Tzu-chiu (許子秋)	9 May 1981	14 January 1986	1711		Sun Yun-suan; Yu Kuo-hua
4	Shih Chun-jen (施純仁)	14 January 1986	2 June 1990	1600		Yu Kuo-hua; Lee Huan
5	Chang Po-ya (張博雅)	2 June 1990	1 September 1997	2648	Independent	Hau Pei-tsun; Lien Chan
6	Steve Chan (詹啟賢)	1 September 1997	19 May 2000	992	Independent	Vincent Siew
7	Lee Ming-liang (李明亮)	20 May 2000	31 August 2002	833	Independent	Tang Fei; Chang Chun-hsiung I Yu Shyi-kun
—	Twu Shiing-jer (涂醒哲)	1 September 2002	31 December 2002	121	Democratic Progressive Party	Yu Shyi-kun
8	Twu Shiing-jer (涂醒哲)	31 December 2002	18 May 2003	138	Democratic Progressive Party	Yu Shyi-kun
9	Chen Chien-jen (陳建仁)	18 May 2003	1 February 2005	625	Independent	Yu Shyi-kun
—	Wang Hsiu-hong (王秀紅)	2 February 2005	16 February 2005	14		Frank Hsieh
10	Hou Sheng-mao (侯勝茂)	17 February 2005	19 May 2008	1187		Frank Hsieh; Su Tseng-chang I Chang Chun-hsiung II
11	Lin Fang-yue (林芳郁)	20 May 2008	25 September 2008	128		Liu Chao-shiuan
12	Yeh Ching-chuan (葉金川)	26 September 2008	6 August 2009	314	Kuomintang	Liu Chao-shiuan
13	Yang Chih-liang (楊志良)	6 August 2009	8 February 2011	551	Kuomintang	Liu Chao-shiuan; Wu Den-yih
14	Chiu Wen-ta (邱文達)	8 February 2011	22 July 2013	895		Wu Den-yih; Sean Chen; Jiang Yi-huah
Minister of Health and Welfare (since 23 July 2013)
1	Chiu Wen-ta (邱文達)	23 July 2013	3 October 2014	438		Jiang Yi-huah
—	Lin Tzou-yien (林奏延)	3 October 2014	22 October 2014	19		Jiang Yi-huah
2	Chiang Been-huang (蔣丙煌)	22 October 2014	19 May 2016	575		Jiang Yi-huah; Mao Chi-kuo; Chang San-cheng
3	Lin Tzou-yien (林奏延)	20 May 2016	7 February 2017	263		Lin Chuan
4	Chen Shih-chung (陳時中)	8 February 2017	17 July 2022	1985	Democratic Progressive Party	Lin Chuan; William Lai; Su Tseng-chang II
5	Hsueh Jui-yuan (薛瑞元)	18 July 2022	20 May 2024	672		Su Tseng-chang II
6	Chiu Tai-yuan (邱泰源)	20 May 2024	1 September 2025	810	Democratic Progressive Party	Cho Jung-tai
5	Shih Chung-liang (石崇良)	1 September 2025	Incumbent			

== Transportation ==
The MOHW building is accessible within walking distance East from Kunyang Station of Taipei Metro.

== See also ==
- Centers for Disease Control (Taiwan)
- Healthcare in Taiwan
- National Health Research Institutes (Taiwan)
- Pharmaceutical Affairs Law (Taiwan)
- Executive Yuan
