= Huang Lieh-Ho =

Taiwanese entrepreneur and business executive

Huang, Lieh-Ho
- 黃烈火
- Born: 10 January 1912; Lukang Township, Changhua County, Taiwan
- Died: 21 March 2010 (aged 98); Taoyuan City, Taiwan
- Occupation: Entrepreneur
- Known for: Known as the "Father of Taiwan's Dairy Industry"

Huang Lieh-Ho (Chinese: 黃烈火, 10 January 1912 - 21 March 2010), was a Taiwanese entrepreneur. He developed the automobile and food industries in Taiwan and was known as the "Father of Taiwan's Dairy Industry" (臺灣乳業之父).

He was the founder of Hotai Motor (和泰汽車) and Wei Chuan Foods (味全食品). He was also one of the founders of Ho Tai Development Co., Ltd. (和泰興業, Taiwan general agent of Daikin Industries).

== Early life ==
Huang was born in Lukang District (鹿港區), Taichung Prefecture (now Lukang Township, Changhua County) during the Japanese colonial period in Taiwan. He lost his father at a young age and was raised by his widowed mother.

== Career ==
He was an early self-made entrepreneur in Taiwan. In 1938, he went to Kobe, Japan with five friends to establish the Hotai & Co. (和泰洋行), which engaged in the trading of cotton cloth and sundries. Later he went to China to do business.

When World War II ended, Huang returned to Taiwan in February 1946. In September 1947, Hotai & Co. resumed business in Taiwan and established branches in Shanghai and Tianjin. The following year, it signed agency agreements with Toyota Motor and Yokohama Rubber in Taiwan and entered the transportation industry. With his entrepreneurial success, Huang founded the Hotai Chemical Industry Company (和泰化學工業公司) in 1953, starting out by producing monosodium glutamate (MSG). The following year, it was renamed Wei Chuan Foods Corporation (味全食品公司). In the past, Wei Chuan enjoyed a great reputation, and there was a saying in Taiwan: "Wei Chuan in the North and Uni-President in the South" (北味全、南統一), meaning that the Taiwanese food industry was dominated by two companies. Wei Chuan was also the first food company in Taiwan to be listed on the stock market.

In 1955, Hotai & Co. (和泰商行) was reorganized into Hotai Trading (和泰貿易). In 1959, Su Yanhui (蘇燕輝) joined Hetai Trading. In 1963, Huang and Su founded Hotai Development (和泰興業), starting out by producing and exporting stainless steel tableware. In 1968, Hotai Trading was reorganized into Hotai Automobile, with Huang as chairman and Su as general manager. In 1968, Huang resigned as chairman of Hotai Motor and was succeeded by the then general manager Su. Because Huang had a deep friendship with the Japanese Toyota family, Su established a close cooperative relationship with Toyota Motor through Huang.

In 1986, Huang resigned as chairman of Wei Chuan and was succeeded by his eldest son Huang Keming. After retirement, Huang devoted himself to charity work. In addition to the "Hotai Chunching Social Welfare Foundation" (和泰純青社會福利基金會), "Wei Chuan Cultural and Educational Foundation" (味全文化教育基金會) and “Chweng Ching Child Nutrition Research Foundation” (純青嬰幼兒營養研究基金會) established when he was running his business, he also established the "HLH Social Welfare Foundation" (黃烈火社會福利基金會).

In 1998, Ting Hsin International Group (頂新集團) took over Wei Chuan Foods, and the Huang family decided to withdraw from the management of Wei Chuan. On the afternoon of 21 March 2010, he died of cardiopulmonary failure at his home in Wei Chuan Pushin Ranch (味全埔心牧場), Yangmei District, Taoyuan City at the age of 98.

== Family ==
Huang was married twice. The eldest son of the first wife, Huang Keming (黃克銘). The second wife gave birth to Huang Nan-Tu (黃南圖) and Huang Nan-Guang (黃南光)

== See also ==
- Hotai Motor
- Wei Chuan Foods Corporation
- Ting Hsin International Group
