= Wei-Chuan USA =

American Chinese food brand

Wei Chuan U.S.A.
- Company type: Private
- Industry: Chinese food manufacturing
- Genre: Chinese food
- Founded: 1972
- Headquarters: Los Angeles, USA
- Area served: USA, Canada, Europe
- Products: Condiments, frozen foods
- Services: Manufacturing, Logistics
- Website: weichuanusa.com

Wei-Chuan USA was founded by the original parent company Wei Chuan Food Corporation of Taiwan in 1972. Wei-Chuan USA's corporate logo consists of five red circles, and they represent the five basic flavors: sweet, sour, salty, bitter, and umami. The company is known for its Chinese food products. In 1998, its then parent company Wei Chuan spun off Wei-Chuan USA and sold the shares to Hotai Motor; in the transaction, Wei Chuan itself was sold to Ting Hsin International Group.

Wei-Chuan USA operates two manufacturing facilities in Los Angeles and Tennessee and six distribution centers located in Jersey City, San Francisco, Chicago, Atlanta, City of Industry, and Houston. It is currently one of the largest Asian food manufacturer base in the United States.
