= Three Siblings' Pudding Incident =

2016 controversy in Taiwan

The Three Siblings' Pudding Incident was a food safety and social controversy that took place in Taiwan between January 8 and 13, 2016.

The incident triggered widespread public reaction and discussion. By the time the controversy subsided, over 500 related posts had been made on the popular online forum PTT. Additionally, the incident garnered more than 100,000 comments on the official Facebook fan page of the pudding shop.

== Background ==
The "Three Siblings Egg Pudding" became well-known in Taiwan through earlier media reports. The three siblings from Kaohsiung—eldest sister Tsai Yi-Wen, second brother Tsai Ya-Che, and youngest brother Tsai Ya-Lun—lost their mother to cancer in February 2012. Their father worked in mainland China, and they were living with their grandmother Hsieh Yu-Chih. Due to the grandmother having no income, and the cancellation of the low-income subsidy previously received when their mother was alive, the siblings learned how to make pudding from relatives and relied on pudding sales to cover their living and educational expenses.

In 2012, they launched a Facebook fan page called "Three Siblings Egg Pudding," which was renamed to "Three Siblings Dessert Shop" on March 19, 2013. Their main product was pudding, with additional offerings such as Cheese,milk jelly, handmade cookies, and drip coffee bags. From 2012 to 2015, they were frequently featured in media reports. The inspirational nature of their story, once publicized online and through media, led to enthusiastic support and orders from well-meaning netizens.

== Origin ==
The controversy began on January 1, 2016, when a professor from Chung Yuan Christian University placed an order for 25 boxes of pudding from the Three Siblings Dessert Shop, requesting that the products arrive by January 7 for his students. The shop confirmed timely delivery. The professor followed up again on January 4, but the pudding was not shipped until noon on January 7 and only arrived on January 8. Since the delivery did not meet the agreed date and thus could not be used for the intended occasion, the professor requested a refund.

Initially, the shop agreed to the refund. However, on January 8, the grandmother called the professor, criticizing him for being narrow-minded and heartless, and later that day posted on Facebook:

"There's a Professor Chen from Chung Yuan University. We were a day late delivering the pudding. We messaged him to apologize, but he wouldn't accept it. We shipped 25 boxes, and he returned them all, saying a professor should have more tolerance. What's the use of being so highly educated?"

At first glance, the post made it seem that the siblings were being unfairly treated. However, Professor Chen soon published a post clarifying the situation.

At 8 PM on January 8, Professor Chen posted on PTT, sharing screenshots of the conversation, stating that he had confirmed delivery deadlines before placing the order. He summarized the situation in a timeline:

- January 1: Order placed, delivery time confirmed
- January 4: Payment made, delivery reminder sent
- January 7: Pudding not received

He further explained that since the pudding only arrived on January 8, he requested a refund, and was unexpectedly scolded by the siblings' grandmother:

"It's just one day late, why do you have to return it? You're so petty. I'll post about this online. If you don't have the heart, don't order from us."

This led to a wave of online criticism against the Three Siblings. That same evening at 10 PM, the shop posted their first apology on Facebook, attempting to explain their side of the story. However, it backfired. As the night went on, more allegations emerged—suggesting the family was not as poor as portrayed, along with accusations of bullying, extortion at school, and food safety concerns. This intensified public backlash against the siblings.

== Incident details ==
=== Suspicions of Affluence Contradicting Public Image ===
Between January 8 and 9, internet users discovered that the siblings and their grandmother wore designer clothing and accessories. Their birthday gifts included luxury wallets and gold jewelry, and they had dined at high-end restaurants. These revelations contradicted their public image of poverty (e.g., social media posts requesting donated blankets, repeated claims of hardship in the media).Accusations arose that they were exploiting public sympathy. The siblings and their grandmother responded by stating the fine meals were gifts and the expensive items were donated by supporters online.However, users quickly found inconsistencies between the grandmother's claims and older Facebook and Instagram posts made by the siblings.

=== Conflicting Accounts About the Father ===
There were also conflicting claims regarding the siblings' father, who was previously reported to be missing due to debt. It was later revealed that he had already returned. The siblings stated that this had been acknowledged in past interviews and was not concealed, while the grandmother claimed that the man was not their father. The inconsistency drew further skepticism from the public.

=== Second Apology ===
At 1 AM on January 10, the siblings posted a second apology on their fan page. The post, reportedly made from Tainan, admitted mishandling the situation and expressed regret to the professor. They again denied any abuse of public sympathy, hoping to calm public anger. However, this second statement was also found to contain inconsistencies.

=== Background in Entertainment ===
Later that same morning, internet users uncovered that the family had a background in the entertainment industry. The father had previously run a film company, and the eldest sister had been a child actress, casting further doubt on the family's previously claimed financial struggles.

== Subsequent developments ==
=== Grandmother's Attempted Suicide by Charcoal Burning ===
On January 10, the grandmother of the three siblings attempted suicide by charcoal burning due to the overwhelming pressure of Public opinion. This incident sparked a heated debate. One side argued that the siblings were still young and should not be harshly condemned or pushed to the brink, while the other contended that both the siblings and their grandmother had refused to admit fault and apologize. According to a report by Apple Daily, a reporter "just happened" to call the grandmother for an interview during the suicide attempt, during which she reportedly stated that she was attempting suicide. Additionally, photos taken by the reporter showed that the charcoal had not yet burned to the point of producing white ash and that an electric fan was running in the room, leading netizens to question whether the entire scene was staged to garner sympathy.

=== Third Apology Statement and Facebook Page Closure ===
On January 12, the Three Siblings Pudding team posted a message on their fan page, apologizing to the professor who had initiated the original dispute. They also announced that after fulfilling the current orders, the fan page would be closed the following afternoon. However, the post was later deleted. On January 13, a spokesperson known as "Uncle" declared that the fan page would remain active, stating that closing it would be a disservice to their supporters.

=== Professor's Statement of Forgiveness ===
On January 13, the professor issued a post expressing forgiveness. He stated that although the focus of the controversy had shifted away from the original dispute over the pudding order, many netizens still blamed him for initiating the issue by requesting a return and refund. Wanting closure, he accepted the siblings' apology—even a short one—but noted that the grandmother had promised a refund on January 11, which had yet to happen. He emphasized that everyone makes mistakes, but learning from them is crucial. Quoting the film The Truman Show, he concluded: "The truth shall set you free."

=== Health Bureau Inspection of the Three Siblings' Pudding ===
Following the outbreak of the Three Siblings' Pudding controversy, a member of the public filed a complaint with the Kaohsiung City Health Bureau, claiming they felt unwell after consuming the product and requesting an investigation into its hygiene practices. In response, the Health Bureau conducted an inspection on the 11th, collecting samples for testing. It was found that the pudding was made in a typical home kitchen. Preliminary findings indicated that the ingredients and production process simply involved "mixing pudding powder with water," thus posing no major health concerns.

=== Tax Bureau to Launch Investigation ===
In light of the controversy, the Three Siblings' Pudding operation also came under suspicion of Tax noncompliance. The Kaohsiung National Taxation Bureau admitted that they had received over 40 complaints within just a few days. They stated that they would investigate whether the business held a valid profit-seeking enterprise registration certificate. The bureau also plans to review financial records and remittance data to determine whether the family failed to report corporate or business taxes.

=== "Black Friday" Remarks ===
On May 16, 2016, the original Facebook page "Two Brothers' Dessert Stand" was shut down. It was later rebranded as "Three Siblings Dessert Stand." A later sales post published on a Friday prompted online ridicule, with some dubbing it "Black Friday Pudding Sale."

=== Entangled in Debt and Criminal Allegations ===
In November 2024, 24-year-old Allen Tsai (Tsai Ya-lun) became involved in multiple legal issues, including working as a money mule for a fraud ring and failing to repay loans. In January 2023, he and other group members withdrew more than NT$350,000 in stolen funds across locations in Pingtung and Kaohsiung. In February of this year, the Kaohsiung District Court sentenced him to one year and one month in prison for fraud. Upon appeal, the sentence was reduced to ten months. Meanwhile, the Pingtung District Court sentenced him to 10 to 11 months in prison for six additional fraud cases, which are still under trial.

The pudding stall operated by the Three Siblings abruptly closed on October 20, 2024, without clearing out its contents. Local residents reported that in recent months, individuals dressed in black had visited the stall looking for the siblings. Due to their failure to repay a NT$590,000 loan, a finance company applied for compulsory enforcement, which has been approved by the court.

== Public Commentary ==
- Lawyer Lü Qiuyuan remarked, "What they were selling wasn't pudding—it was sympathy. So the real issue with the Three Siblings isn't whether they used the money to buy luxury goods, but that their actions violated the nature of the product they were selling. If they truly want to continue making a living by selling pudding, the only path forward is to improve the product quality, not to keep arguing or apologizing. Because sympathy has already run out."
- Host Kevin Tsai stated, "We do good deeds because it feels right and aligns with how we expect ourselves to behave—not because it gives us the right to tell others how to live. Giving is often about wanting to give, not about being superior."
- Singer Hsieh Ho-hsien said, "Remember the 'Chung Ming Hin's' mom? She really did take her life. And remember Cindy Yang? She too ended her life over public pressure. Taiwan isn't lacking in people who can't stand others living better than themselves. If someone is pushed to death, can you really sleep at night? Have a heart—after all, Taiwan's most beautiful scenery is supposed to be its people."
- Entertainer Kuo Yen-fu recalled filming the Three Siblings Pudding story years ago, saying, "They were truly struggling back then, living above a scooter repair shop. After being helped by the kindness of many, the kids should have learned to pass that love on. True success requires hard work. Otherwise, they might end up in a worse situation than before."He added, "When you stumble on the road of life, some will help you up, but no one is meant to carry you all the way. Everyone has their own path to walk—don't you think?"
- Commentator Chen Yi criticized the grandmother's suicide attempt, saying, "It's like a melodramatic soap opera stunt, desperate for ratings. So, if a corporate villain like Wei Ying-chung tried the same, should we forgive him too? Of course not! When you lie and cheat and get condemned for it, it's what you deserve. Own up to your actions. Crying and making a scene to redirect public opinion into blaming netizens for bullying is incredibly despicable."
- AdFan, a marketing blogger, said the Three Siblings Pudding saga had a plot twist ending. She argued that people were upset because the siblings (and their grandmother) abused public kindness—claiming they lacked school fees and blankets one day, then flaunting perfume, trendy T-shirts, and iPhones the next. She referenced a story of a Chinese actress surnamed Xu, who once helped a poor student, only to find that the student used the funds to buy a new phone. Xu was enraged and ended all aid. AdFan reflected, "We all have different reasons for doing charity, but the goal is the same: to improve lives. Xu's intent was clear—helping kids escape poverty. She likely expected them to appreciate that support and use it wisely. I didn't agree back then, but now... I think I'd make the same choice."
- Lyricist Hsu Chang-te commented, "Some justice is domineering, some is shallow and ignorant; sometimes it even becomes a new form of harm. Excessively rigid 'justice' can turn into false righteousness. Society fears 'too much love' but hates 'not enough hate.'" He lamented that well-intentioned justice can sometimes become oppressive and cause even more harm.
- Internet personality Kiwebaby reflected, "We often help the disadvantaged out of sympathy. But when they are no longer disadvantaged, doesn't that mean our help worked? Shouldn't we feel happy for them? People say those selling Chewing gum or flowers might actually be rich—but that's not the point. Some of us just want them to go home earlier."
- TV host Yu Mei-ren discussed the issue on a talk show, questioning the grandmother's alleged suicide attempt while speaking to the media. She also raised concerns about the misuse of donations after netizens uncovered that the Three Siblings had perfumes, designer clothes, and iPhones—sparking anger over their apparent abuse of sympathy. Yu asked, "People bought pudding to help them live better. So why is everyone uncomfortable now that their living standards improved?" Co-host Cheng Hung-yi also questioned, "What's so fake about that? They said those items were gifts from supporters—what's wrong with that?"Still, Yu advised the Three Siblings to seriously develop their pudding brand: "If your product doesn't taste good, no one will buy it. Sympathy won't last forever."
- Internet personality Jie-ge (Li Bing-jie) said, 'Even when poor, one should maintain dignity." She hoped the siblings could grow and learn from this, rather than relying solely on society's kindness.
- Online commenter "Village Goddess" QN "Huang Rachel" claimed that Taiwan is full of people who are both illogical and overly emotional, which is why corrupt businesses can survive.
- Internet celebrity Sprite said people bought pudding out of kindness. Now that the siblings' lives have improved, they could help others in return. She hoped the Three Siblings would learn their lesson and correct their mistakes, and urged netizens to give them another chance: "Don't drive people to the gallows of public execution. The pressure from public opinion can kill—please remember that."
- Model Kao Ting-yu posted on Facebook, sharing a story and warning those who receive help not to lose perspective. He criticized the siblings' apology as hollow and insincere, and feared that genuine good-hearted people would be discouraged from helping others again. He concluded,"The road to hell is often paved with good intentions."
