= Hotai Motor =

Taiwan-based automotive-centric conglomerate

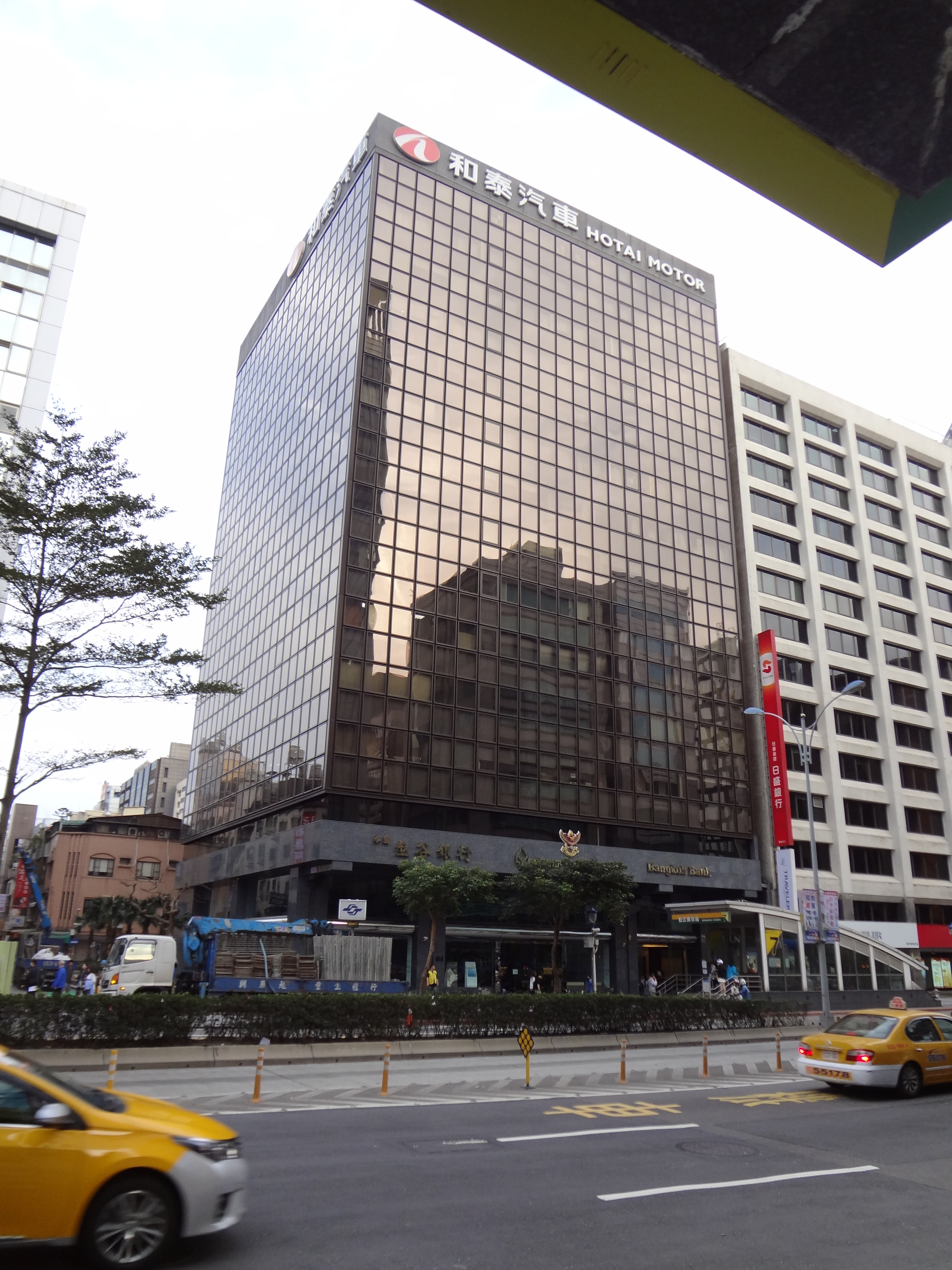
- Hotai Motor Building
- Native name: 和泰汽車
- Romanized name: Hétài Qìchē
- Industry: Automotive, Finance, Insurance, Appliance
- Founded: September 1947
- Founder: Lieh-ho Huang
- Headquarters: Zhongshan, Taipei, Taiwan
- Area served: Taiwan
- Key people: Nan-kuang Huang (Chairman); Justin Su (President)
- Brands: Toyota, Lexus, Hino, Daikin
- Revenue: 8.62 billion USD (Consolidated 23.1 billion USD) (2021)
- Number of employees: 540 (Consolidated: 23,533) (March 2018)
- Subsidiaries: 78 Subsidiaries
- Website: hotaimotor.com.tw

Hotai Motor Co., Ltd. (Chinese: 和泰汽車; pinyin: Hétài Qìchē), also known more commonly as Hotai Group, is a Taiwan-based automotive-centric conglomerate. It is the largest automobile company and the second largest household appliance company, as well as one of the largest financial holding companies in Taiwan. Traditionally, Hotai is regarded as one of the top four conglomerates and the oldest amongst the "Big Four" business groups in Taiwan. Hotai Motor can be traced to the founding of its predecessor Hotai Trading Co. in China and Japan in 1937 by Lieh-ho Huang.

As of 2024, Hotai Motor Co. also has subsidiaries engaging in car rental, auto leasing, auto insurances, auto financial services and auto parts and are dominating position on all sectors related to automobiles in Taiwan. In addition, the conglomerate is also the largest air condition company, and one of the largest insurance companies in Taiwan. In 2018, Hotai Motor completed the acquisition of Zurich Insurance Taiwan for US$198 million, making the company one of the leading insurance companies in Taiwan. Kuozui Motors, a joint venture between Hotai (30%), Toyota (65%) and Hino (5%), manufacturers small-sized vehicles, including cars and commercial vehicles, under the brand name of Toyota and Lexus, as well as large-sized vehicles, including trucks and passenger cars, under the brand names such as Toyota and Hino, in Guanyin and Kuanyin, Taoyuan.

As of 2024, Hotai Motor was the largest automobile manufacturer in the country, occupying 34.9% market share, ahead of its rival Yulon Motor Group.

== History ==
Hotai's predecessor Watai Yoko (Hotai Trading Co.) was founded in 1937 in Kobe, Japan by 27-year-old Lieh-ho Huang to trade in textiles and sundry items. After the end of World War II, Hotai obtained the distribution contract from Exxon Mobil Corporation to ship petroleum from Shanghai to Taiwan. Hotai also shipped sugar from Taiwan to mainland China using the same vessel to maximize operating efficiency.

A few years later, Huang returned to Japan to discuss business with local industries and formally registered the company in Taiwan in September 1947, creating the modern entity. In 1949, Hotai signed the Taiwan sole agent agreement with Yokohama Tire and Toyota Motors (the first overseas distributor of Toyota Motors). In 1952, Hotai became the first overseas distributor of Hino Motors, Ltd.

Hotai established Hotai Chemical Engineering Corporation (later known as Wei-Chuan Food Corporation) in 1953 to produce MSG and soy sauce. Wei-Chuan expanded into the dairy industry in the early 1960s. With the food business diversification planning of Huang, Wei-Chuan became the largest food processing and manufacturing company in Taiwan in the 1960s and 1970s. Wei-Chuan was spin-off and sold to Ting Hsin International Group in 1998. One of the joint ventures, Formosa Flexible Packaging, moved back to Hotai Motor Group. As part of the agreement, Wei-Chuan also divested from Wei-Chuan USA and sold its share to the founding family of Hotai.

In 1984 Toyota, Hino Motors, and Hotai Motor established of Kuozui Motors, and quickly build up the company to become the largest automobile manufacturer in Taiwan. Kuozui currently operates two plants and have a total capacity in excess of 200,000 vehicle annual and is one of the few Toyota factories with the capability to build hybrid vehicles.

In the same year, the appliance trading division, which distribute General Electric appliances was spin off into Hotai Development Co.. In 1989 Hotai Development formed a joint venture with Japan's largest electronic retailing, Daiichi Denki, to establish Taiichi Electronic and become the largest appliance and electronic retaining chain in Taiwan. In 1992, Hotai Development signed the distribution right of Daikin Air Conditions and over the next twenty years established the company to be the largest air condition company in Taiwan.

Today, the founder Leih-ho Huang was also called the “Father of the Modern Economy” in Taiwan for his contribution and involvement in various aspects of business directly connected to everyday life.

=== Recent years ===
In 1999, Hotai established Hotai Finance and Hotai Leasing with Toyota Financial Services owning 33% of the newly established companies. The two companies form further ventures including Hotai Rental, Hotai Auction, Hotai Used Vehicles, 24HR iRent, Hotai Car Sharing, and Hotai Cloud Services with each individual companies becoming the leader in market share. Hotai Finance become the first foreign company to be approved of leasing operating in China and has grown to one of the largest leasing companies in China

In 2002 one of Hotai's associated companies, China Insurance Co., was merge with Taiwan's side of the historic Bank of China and Bank of Communications to form Mega Financial Holding, the largest financial holding company in Taiwan. Hotai became the minority owner of the newly form financial holding company.

In 2012 Hotai's subsidiary Carmax Auto Accessories was converted into a joint venture between Hotai and Toyota Customizing & Development Co., and begin to expand into China and Middle East.

Between 2014 and 2017, Hotai Motor acquired between 20% and 100% of every dealership in the region and part of China for US$580 million and directed the upgrade of the next generation of Toyota and Lexus customer experience.

2018, in order to enhance customer experience and provide complete services, Hotai completed the acquisition of Zurich Insurance Taiwan with an all-cash offer of US$198 million and rename the company Hotai Insurance Co.. The company quick emerge to become one of Taiwan's leading insurance companies.

In 2019, Hotai launch an open market purchase of US$220 million investment into Toyota to become minority shareholder of the company, further solidify the relationship of the two companies.

In December 2019. Hotai Finance become the largest non-state own company to have an initial public offering in the Taiwan Stock Market, with the first day trading price value the company at over US$2.1 billion and its parent company, Hotai Motor, valued at over US$12 billion.

2020 Hotai merge its iRent Carshare unit with the newly formed Hotai Connected to form its Mobility as a Service (MaaS) arm and entered the Taxi service. The division now offers taxi, carshare, car rental, shuttle, and delivery.

In 2021, Hotai established Hotai Auto Body that focus on converting specialty vehicles ranging from firetrucks, buses, construction vehicles and others with the newly built conversion plant.

In 2023, Hotai Group contributed 40% investment in eTreego, an ITRI startup supported by MOEA's technology development programmes. Together with Shihlin Electric, founded Gochabar, the region's first smart charging system for charging station operators (CPOs) and software companies.

Lexus' new LBX model was released in 2024. A new series of UX 300h electric vehicles are planned, as well as Toyota's H2 City Gold hydrogen-powered commercial electric buses.

=== Corporate social responsibility ===
In 1974, Hotai established the Chun Ching Social Welfare Foundation. In 1979, established the Wei-Chuan Cultural-Educational Foundation. And in 1985, established the Chun Ching Pediatric Nutrition Research Foundation. Lieh-ho Huang further established the Huang Lieh-Ho Social Welfare Foundation after retirement to focus on social charity and promote his belief in “a beautiful life and a happy family” for “a peaceful society”. Today, there are more than 10 foundations focusing on different aspects on charity and form the second largest welfare group in Taiwan with an operating budget in 2018 of US$6.4 billion.

== Products ==
=== Current ===
- Toyota Crown Crossover 2023–present
- Toyota C-HR 2017—present
- Toyota Prado 1997—present
- Toyota Sienna 2016—present
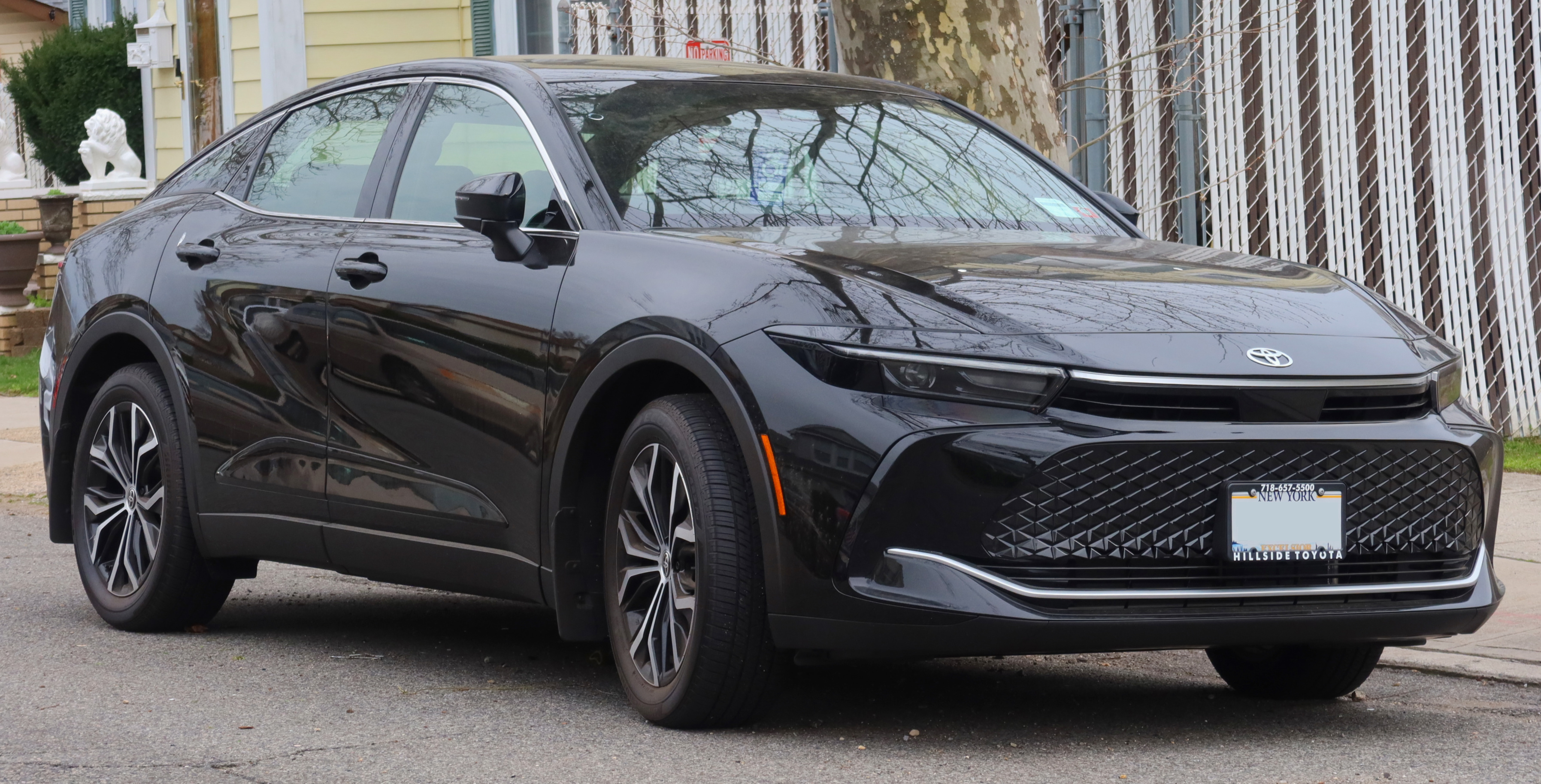
Toyota Crown Crossover

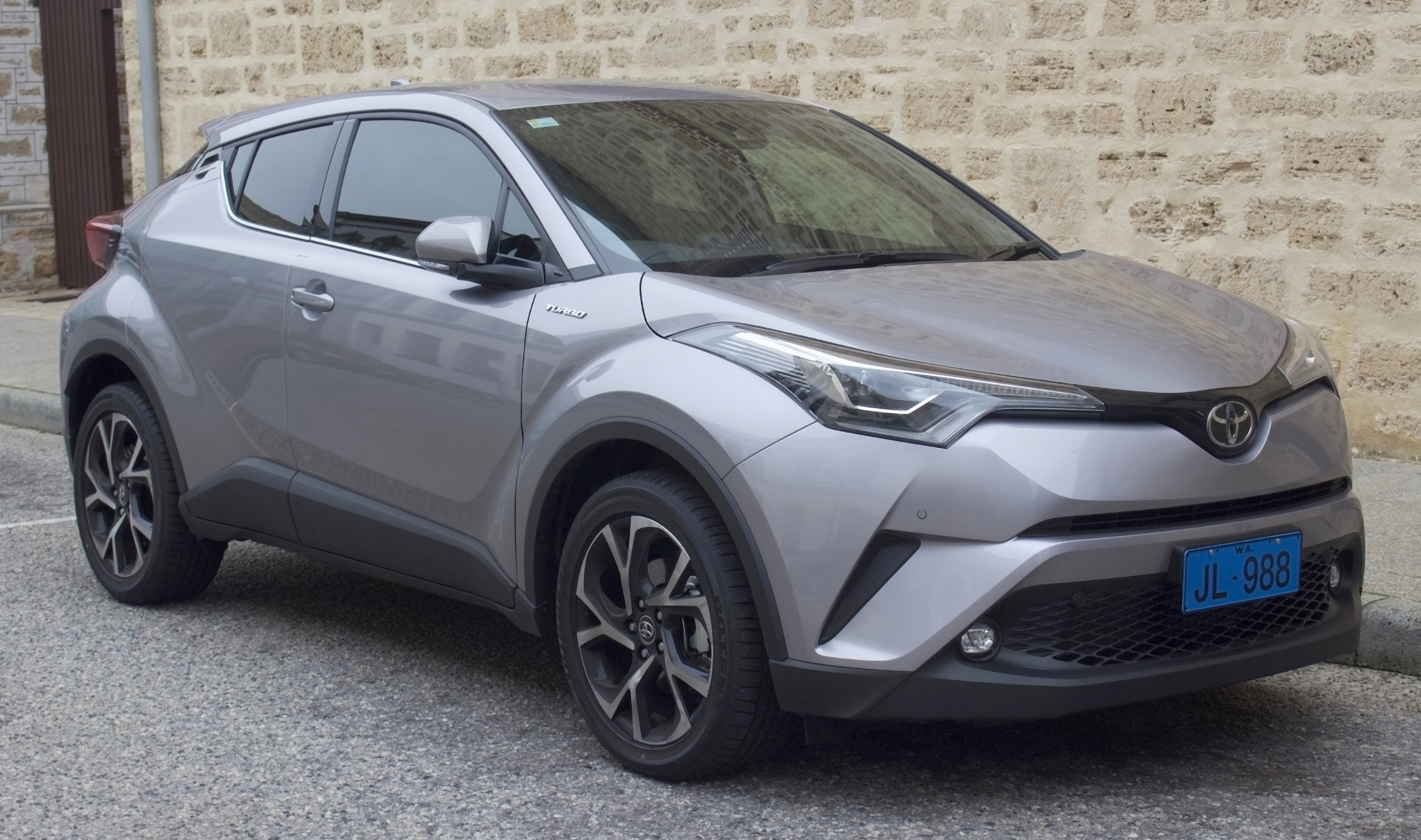
Toyota C-HR

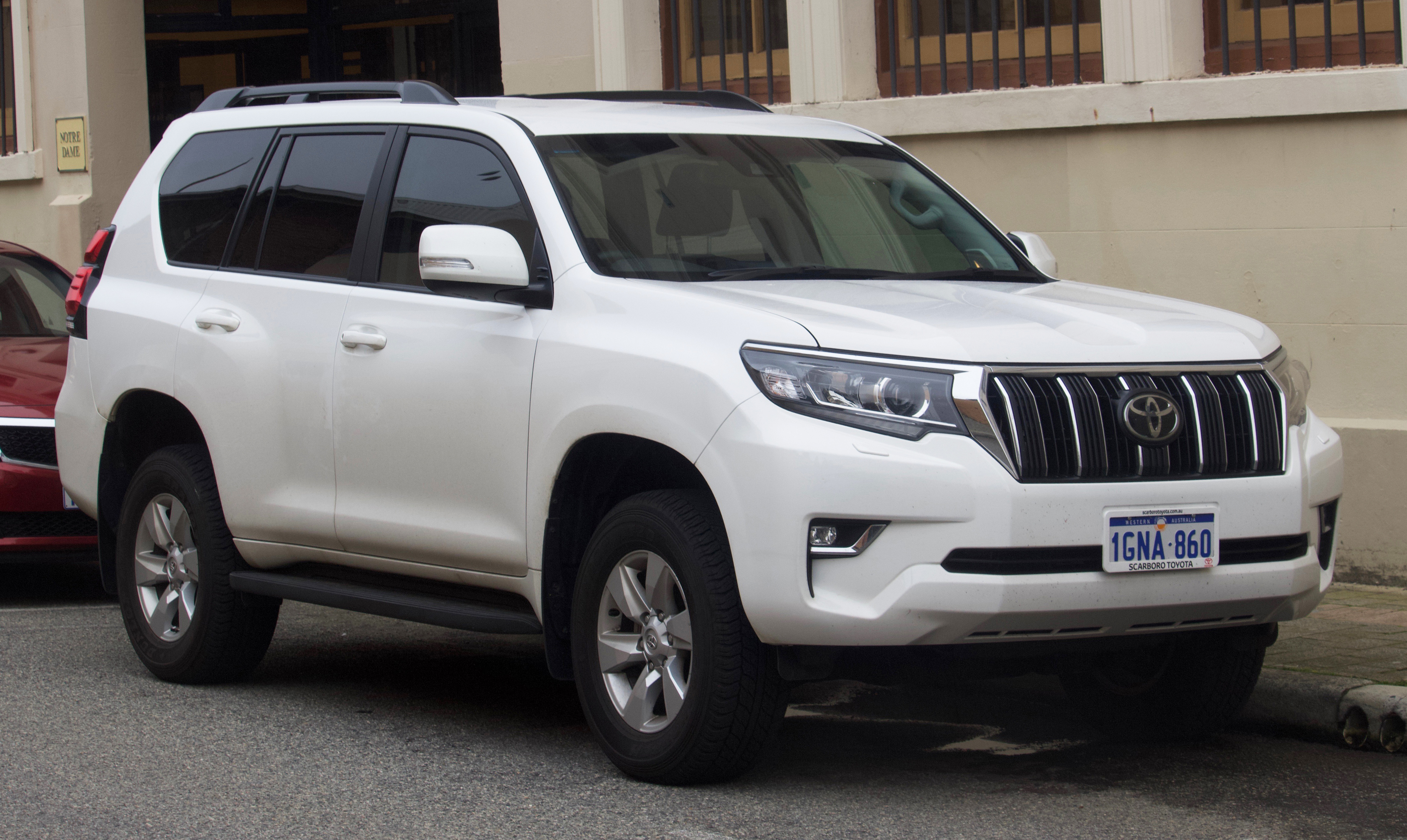
Toyota Prado

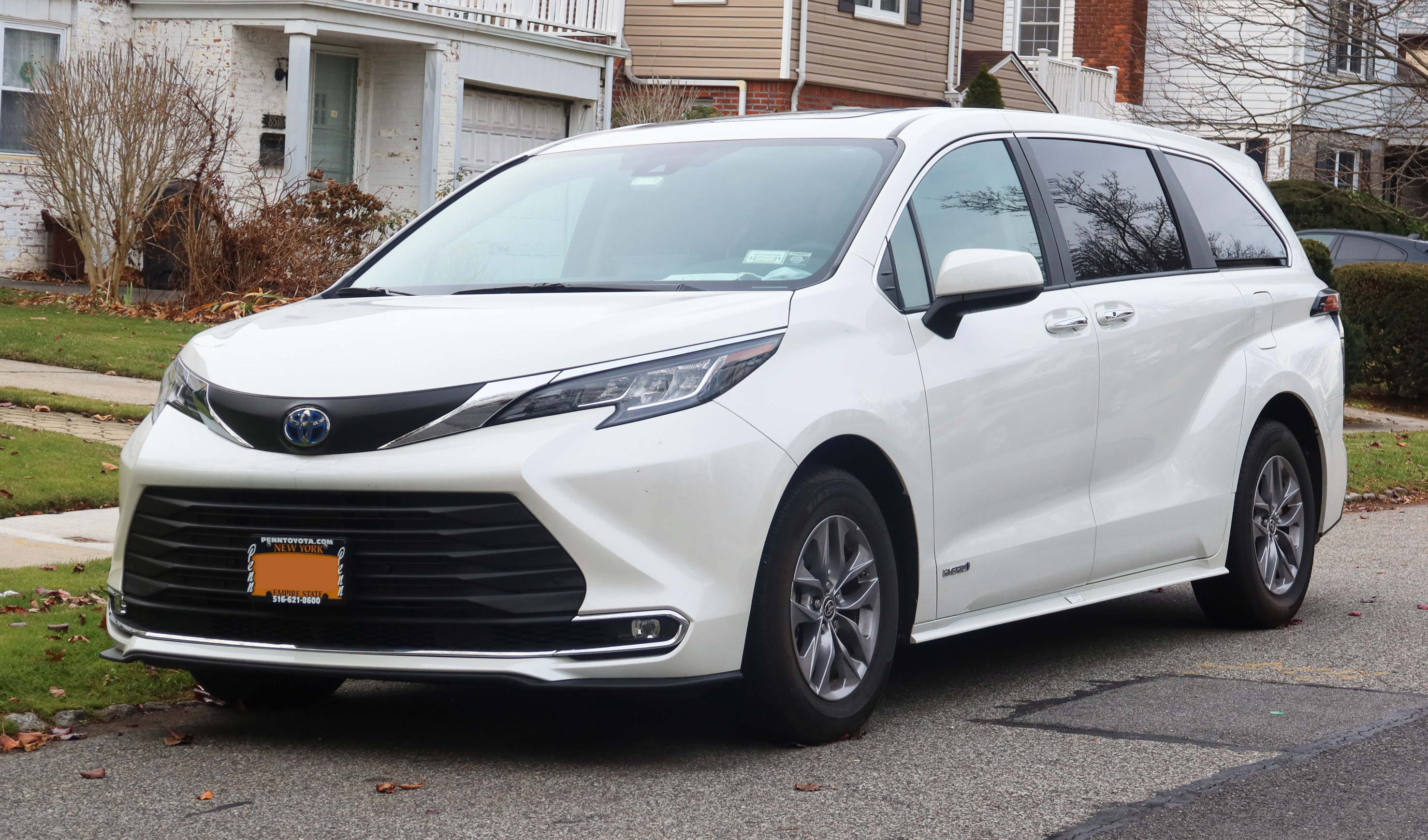
Toyota Sienna

=== Former production ===
- Toyota Crown 1957—1994
- Toyota Land Cruiser 1961—1997
- Toyota Stout 1962—1976
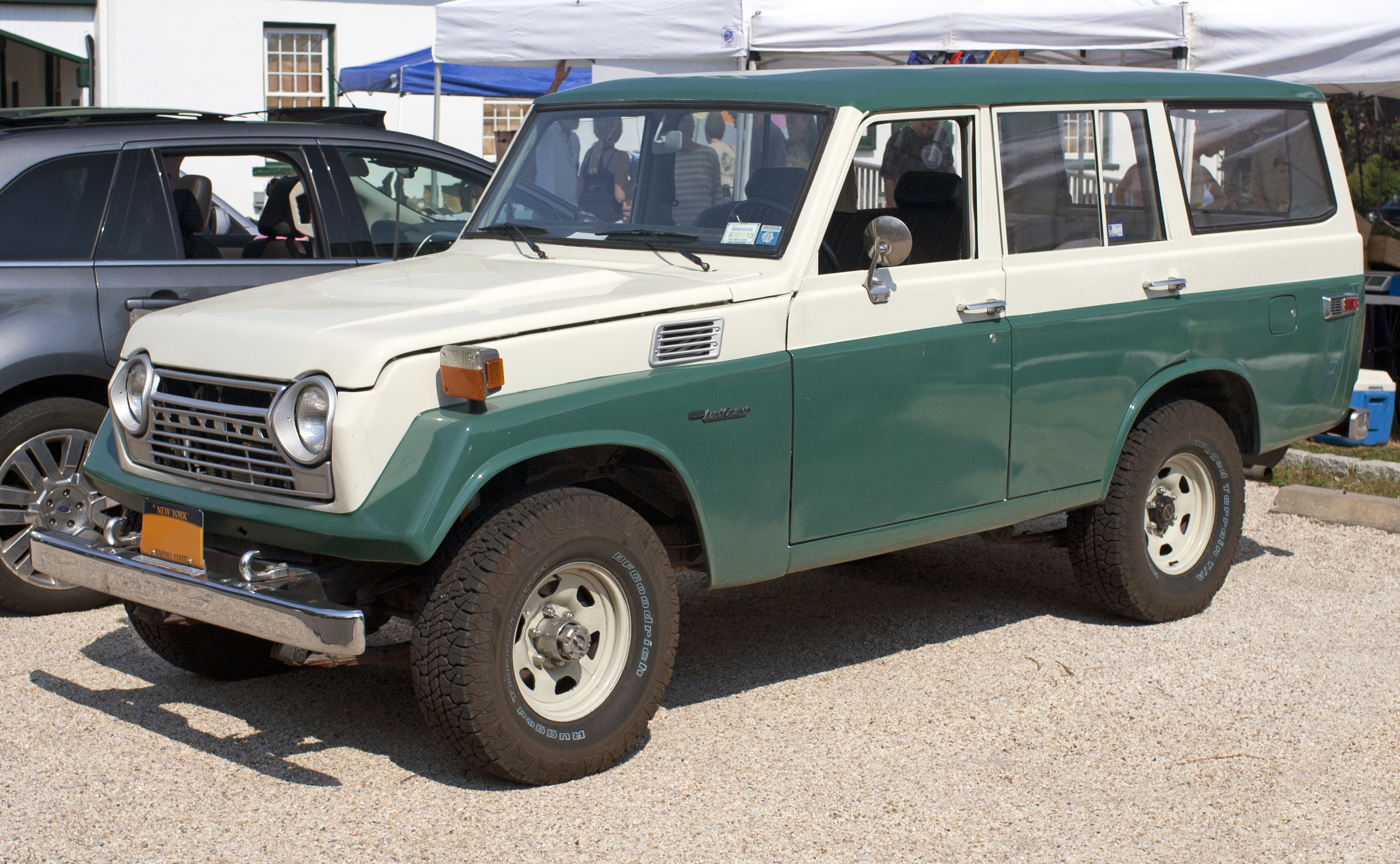
Toyota Land Cruiser

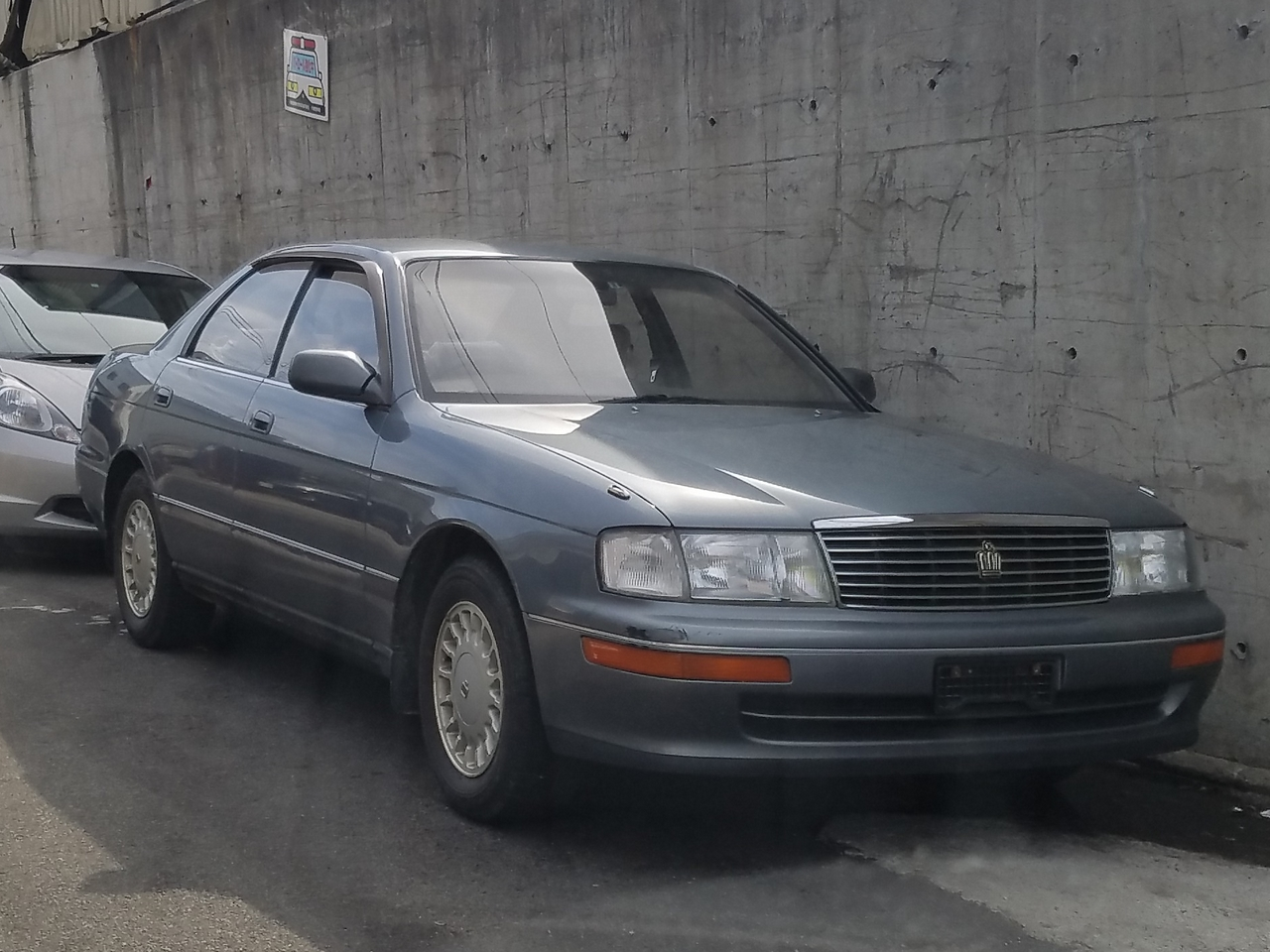
Toyota Crown

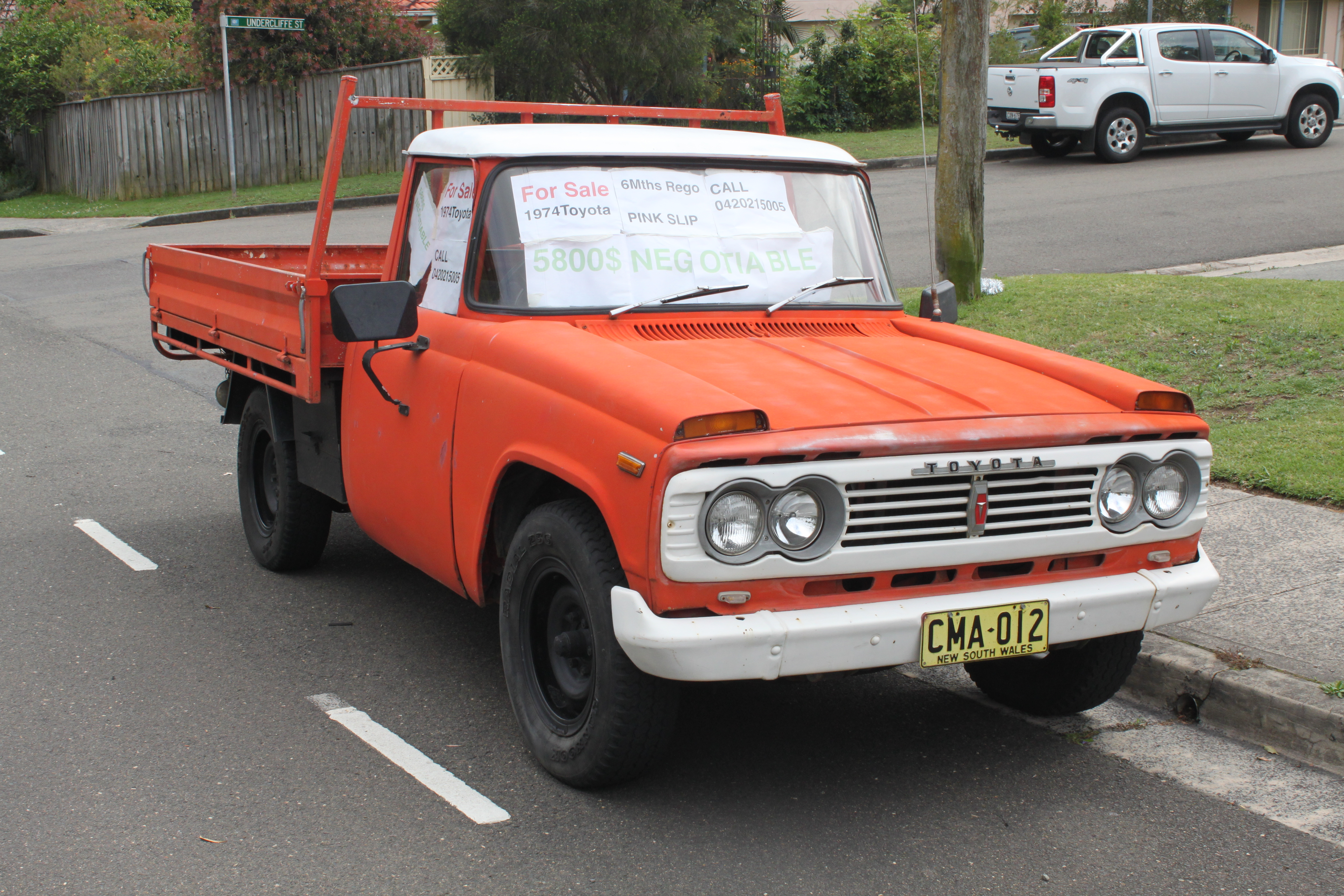
Toyota Stout

== See also ==
- List of Taiwanese automakers
- List of companies of Taiwan
- Transportation in Taiwan
