= Xi'an Economic and Technological Development Zone =

State-level economic zone in Xi'an

Xi'an Economic and Technological Development Zone (Chinese: 西安经济技术开发区) is a state-level economic development zone in Xi'an, Shaanxi, China. The zone was established in 2000. It is located at North Gate of Xi'an with its developed area of 4.9 square kilometres.

The zone attracts many foreign investments in there, such as Coca-Cola, General Motors, HP, Mitsubishi Electric, ABB Group, Rolls-Royce, Taikoo Group, Siemens and Ting Hsin. The pillar industries in there include mechanicals, electronics, light industry, foods, bio-pharmaceuticals, new materials and high-tech products.
