= 2014 Taiwanese adulterated oil scandal =

Food safety scandal in Taiwan

The 2014 Taiwanese adulterated oil scandal is an incident in 2014 when many edible oil manufacturers in Taiwan were found to have violated the law. The incident aroused widespread public attention on food safety issues, including the detection of several scandals of inferior oil products.

== Reasons and analysis ==
=== Adulterated edible pork lard ===
Around 2009, an elderly farmer in a village in Pingtung County retired from the north to his hometown to farm and raise chickens and ducks. Several months later, Guo Liecheng purchased land nearby and set up an "underground oil factory" specializing in the production of adulterated low-quality oils. Due to improper waste discharge, the factory caused a foul odor that made the surrounding environment unbearable. The elderly farmer and other local residents repeatedly reported this to the Pingtung County government, but to no avail. Eventually, they gathered evidence on their own. In August 2013, through a friend, they reported the case to the Taichung City Police Department. After gathering evidence, the officers, due to the long distance, transferred the case to the Pingtung District Prosecutors Office in April 2014, leading to the eventual bust of this case, which threatened public food safety. However, the subsequent extensive media coverage made the villagers worry about possible retaliation from criminal groups.

Law enforcement officials pointed out that Chang Guann Co. was a well-established oil company in Taiwan, with some products certified by ISO and WHO's food GMP standards. In early 2014, the price of Chang Guann's lard rose by about 10% above the market rate, deceiving thousands of mid- and downstream companies and affecting the entire Taiwanese population. The company’s chairman, Yeh Wen-hsiang, had been in the oil processing business for 40 years and had been reported multiple times for producing adulterated oil from recycled waste oil. Since 2008, he had imported animal feed oil from Hong Kong, amassing 56 batches totaling 2,385 tons of pork oil, which was secretly processed into low-quality edible oil, a fraudulent practice that may have been ongoing for years.

On September 4, 2014, the Taiwan Food and Drug Administration (TFDA) stated that Chang Guann Co. had purchased recycled waste oil and gutter oil from "Guo Liecheng's factory" in Pingtung, blending 33% of this adulterated oil with 67% lard to produce a product labeled as "Chuan Tung Fragrant Lard." Many well-known downstream companies used this tainted oil. The Taipei City Department of Health held a press conference in the evening, revealing that 12 processed products, such as meat sauces and meat floss manufactured by Wei Chuan Corp., a subsidiary of Ting Hsin International Group, were made with Chang Guann's "Chuan Tung Fragrant Lard." Wei Chuan voluntarily initiated recalls, ceased sales, and took preventive measures. The Department of Health urged food businesses that had used or sold processed products containing this lard to halt manufacturing, processing, and sales, and to report to the health authorities for inspection and traceability.

=== Adulterated feed oil ===
==== Guo Liecheng's underground gutter oil factory in Pingtung, Jin Wei Enterprises ====
Due to negligence by the Pingtung County Government, Guo Liecheng's underground gutter oil factory and Jin Wei Enterprises (which had a temporary factory registration that was revoked on September 19) were able to operate, as well as the illegal Yoho Beach Resort in Kenting, which was allowed to continue its business "legally." On the evening of September 11, Zhu Qingcheng, Deputy Director of the Livestock Department of the Council of Agriculture, released transaction details from Jin Wei for January to the end of August 2014. A total of 815.7 tons of oil were distributed to 14 companies, with 26.1 tons being sealed, and 789.6 tons already sold. It is suspected that 96.8% of this oil had already been consumed by the public. Feed oil was not listed as a registered ingredient for animal feed, and its raw materials, production process, and distribution were never regulated. Gutter oil was even mixed into feed oil for animals, which eventually ended up being consumed by humans.

On September 10, investigators discovered that Jin Wei had been commissioned by major food companies, such as Ju Yi, to refine "edible goose oil" for almost a year, even though Jin Wei was only authorized to produce "animal feed oil." The Pingtung County government could not find the appropriate legal regulations to impose penalties and could only order the factory to shut down due to unsanitary conditions, revealing a gap in law enforcement.

==== Hsin Hao Enterprises (upstream supplier of Ting Hsin International Group) ====
In the early hours of October 8, Hsin Hao Enterprises Co., Ltd. representative Wu Ronghe was detained by investigators after being found to have adulterated “feed oil” with “edible lard” since 2012. This refined oil was then sold to Cheng I Food Co., leading to the contamination of multiple “Cheng I oil” products. It was revealed that Hsin Hao, established by Wu, had minimal staffing, sometimes employing only one or two temporary sales agents. Hsin Hao’s oil sources were complex, involving at least four different types of oils from more than seven suppliers, including feed oil, palm oil, mixed animal-vegetable oil, and recycled waste oil.

According to an October 9 report by TVBS, Wu previously served as the head of the “Special Sales Department” in 2004, responsible for “procurement.” He allegedly left due to disagreements with Ting Hsin International Group after it took control, but in 2010, he started transacting with his former employer through his newly established Hsin Hao company. Prosecutors indicated that, in the past, inspections were conducted by Wu’s former colleagues. However, in May 2014, a new employee who was unfamiliar with him conducted an audit, detected issues with the source of Wu’s lard, and reported it, prompting Cheng I to halt cooperation with him.

On October 10, Apple Daily reported that the Tainan District Prosecutor’s Office stated Hsin Hao’s upstream suppliers included Fulong Oil Company, Jinlong, and Jinhong Trading, all of which are owned by Kuo Shengrong, and all are located in Yihe Village, Citong Township, Yunlin County. Legislator Lin Shufen questioned, “How could a major oil company like Ting Hsin’s Cheng I purchase from Hsin Hao, which doesn’t even own an oil tank?”

On October 10, United Daily News reported that the Tainan District Prosecutor’s Office found that Kuo Shengrong’s companies (Jinhong, Fulong, Jinlong) and Chang Guann had imported 731 tons of non-edible mixed animal and vegetable oil from Golden Pacific, a Hong Kong-based company, which was then resold by Hsin Hao to Cheng I. Meanwhile, Jiufeng Company in Chiayi County also sourced oil from Golden Pacific. Apple Daily on the same day confirmed this but noted that Jiufeng’s oil, imported as “fish oil for feed,” was transported by tank truck directly to Cheng I for processing into edible oil, bypassing customs documentation. The Chiayi Health Bureau indicated that Wu Ronghe used his former connections at Cheng I to secure sales by “personal guarantee” rather than providing customs documentation, violating operational procedures.

On October 9, the Kaohsiung Department of Health and local investigators traced eight upstream suppliers for Cheng I, including Hsin Hao and two other companies in Kaohsiung (He'an and Yongchen), while the other five were referred to regional authorities for further investigation into their oil sources. Zhu Qingcheng, Deputy Director of the Council of Agriculture’s Livestock Department, stated that Hsin Hao was classified as an oil vendor, while Jinhong and Jiufeng were trade companies, and thus not subject to penalties under the existing Feed Management Act. Additionally, the Livestock Department requested that the Pingtung County government investigate the origins and distribution of the lard Hsin Hao purchased from two underground factories in Jiuru and Changzhi Townships in Pingtung.

==== Ting Hsin International Group and upstream suppliers ====
- In the past, imported oils only required customs declarations, and it wasn't until 2012 that the Ministry of Health and Welfare (MOHW) began regulating imported oils. According to the indictment against Wei Ying-chung, Ting Hsin Oil began importing feed oil from Vietnam’s Dai Hsing Fu for use as lard in 2012.
- On October 12, several individuals, including Yang Chen-yi, the head of Dai Hsing Fu (a supplier of Vietnamese feed oil imported by Ting Hsin), were detained. The feed oil supplied by Dai Hsing Fu to clients like Ting Hsin was priced at 20 to 25 NTD per kilogram, even cheaper than Guo Liecheng’s gutter oil, which was priced at 26.7 NTD per kilogram. However, according to the attachment to the first-instance verdict of the Changhua District Court, the actual price for lard imported by Ting Hsin from Dai Hsing Fu ranged from 23.33 to 32.87 NTD, with 15 out of 26 batches priced above 27 NTD per kilogram, contradicting reports that it was cheaper than Guo Liecheng’s gutter oil. The MOHW could only track imported oil quantities from Dai Hsing Fu from August 2013 onward. This limitation was due to the Customs Administration, under the Ministry of Finance, only amending the "Customs Cooperation for Import and Export Trade Management Regulations" on August 16, 2013. This amendment required edible and feed oil imports to undergo inspection by the MOHW's Food and Drug Administration (FDA), with customs assisting in inspections, thus allowing for records of Dai Hsing Fu's imports to be traced.

=== Hong Kong’s Golden Pacific ===
The Tainan District Prosecutor’s Office discovered that Hsin Hao’s upstream supplier had the same origin as the adulterated oil products of Chang Guann, both tracing back to Hong Kong’s Golden Pacific Company. Feng Runlan, Director of the Regional Control Center at Taiwan’s Food and Drug Administration (FDA), stated that Hong Kong's Center for Food Safety responded that the case is still under criminal investigation, and arrangements for Taiwanese personnel to visit Hong Kong cannot be made at this time.

== Product overview ==
According to the list of affected products released by Taiwan's Ministry of Health and Welfare's Food and Drug Administration (FDA), as of September 6, a total of 235 companies were found to have used "Chuan Tung Fragrant Lard" produced by Chang Guann Co., Ltd. On the same day, health authorities in Kaohsiung, Tainan, Changhua, and New Taipei City also discovered that Chang Guann had produced rancid oil for Gong Yan Integrated Marketing Company under the label “Hejiang Fragrant Lard.” This oil was distributed widely, reaching ingredient suppliers, grain stores, bakeries, breakfast shops, and street vendors.

By September 12–13, the scandal expanded as 24 additional lard products from Chang Guann and oils from Fang Fu Company were identified as tainted, leading to a growing number of affected stores and consumers. Despite the public’s alarm, the government initially struggled to find an effective solution, exacerbating concerns over food safety.

=== Hong Kong ===
On September 7, 2014, the Hong Kong government announced that three import companies—Dah Chong Hong Holdings Ltd., Veggie International Limited, and Angliss Hong Kong Food Service Ltd.—had imported other lard products from Taiwan's Chang Guann Companyports revealed that Maxim’s Group purchased at least 360 barrels of tainted lard, which was used in their bakery branches, such as Arome Bakery, Can.Teen, and specialty stores of Starbucks, including in the production of pineapple buns.

On Se two major food companies, Lam Soon and Hop Hing, along with the restaurant group Cafe de Coral, were also implicated. Cafe de Coral cn September 9 that one of their food suppliers had used refined lard from Chang Guann for sauces in Hong Kong branches. The company stated they were unaware of the issue beforehand and reported it to the Hong Kong authorities, who arranged for further testing of lard samples.

On September 9, Hong Kor for Food Safety (CFS) released a list of nearly 400 affected downstream companies, including renowned bakeries like Danish Bakery and Yuen Long Tai Tung. High-profile establishments such as Amigo French Restaurant in Happy Valley, Hyatt Regency Tsim Sha Tsui, Wang Jia Sha, and Butao Ramen in Shatin, as well as Michelin-recommended Ho Mong Kok Noodles in Mong Kok, were listed as having used the tainted oil. Many named restaurants claimed they were uncertain why they appeared on the list. The Food and Environmental Hygiene Department issued a Gazette notice, ordering a recall of approximately 500 tons of affected products, although only 10% could be verified for storage.

On September 17, the CFS published that 141 businesses potentially involved in distributing or using Chang Guann’s lard products, including the Hong Kong Independent Commission Against Corruption's (ICAC) staff canteen.

On September 23, the CFS found that ThreeHen* Products—meat floss, seaweed meat floss, and black pork flakes—were involved.

On September 24, 28 additional vendors were affected, mainly bakeries and cha chaan teng (Hong Kong-style cafes), notably including the Kam Fung Cafe in Wan Chai, famous for its chicken pie and milk tea.

=== Macau ===
In Macau, importer Dai Hing Oils & Fd. had over 1,000 barrels of the tainted product in stock. The company halted sales of suspected products and notified downstream clients to stop using and selling the affected items.

=== Mainland China ===
After an initial investigation, the General Administration of Quality Supervision, Inspection and Quarantine (AQSIQ) in China confirmed that there were no imports of the problematic "Chuan Tung Fragrant Lard." However, AQSIQ issued a consumer advisory to avoid products possibly containing tainted oil purchased through various channels. They directed local inspection and quarantine agencies to halt inspections of products from the 235 companies implicated in Taiwan and to check prior import records. Any related products were to be immediately removed from shelves and recalled. Additionally, Maxim’s Cake Shop and other Maxim's stores in mainland China stated that they did not use Chang Guann’s lard. Similarly, the Hangzhou Wei Chuan Company stated it did not use any edible oils from Taiwan.

On September 8, Taoyuan County's Health Bureau found that garlic toast commissioned by Yi Wang Trading Co. contained the tainted oil. Part of this batch had already reached the market, with one distributor reportedly based in mainland China, though details were withheld. This garlic toast had previously appeared on the popular Taiwanese show Kangsi Coming. In Shanghai, the Food and Drug Administration (FDA) mobilized over 500 inspectors for city-wide checks following Taiwan's media reports and AQSIQ's announcements, leading to the removal of approximately 8,700 affected items by September 9. Wei Chuan and 85 °C Bakery both issued statements declaring that their China-based products were unaffected, though some supermarkets still removed Wei Chuan and Sheng Xiang Zhen-branded products from shelves. Some affected items, however, were still accessible through online channels.

In Xiamen, 4.9 tons of goods containing tainted lard—including Wei Chuan’s pickled mustard greens, “Zhenwei” meat sauces, and Sheng Xiang Zhen’s baked goods—were detected. These products were subsequently recalled and secured. In Guangdong Province, as of September 9, no relevant Taiwanese products had been found at port inspections. On September 10, the Wenzhou Inspection and Quarantine Bureau in Zhejiang seized products from the implicated Wei Wang and Sheng Xiang Zhen companies, specifically Wei Wang's beef stew packets and Sheng Xiang Zhen’s melon seeds. These items were contained and scheduled for return or destruction.

By October 11, Fujian authorities reported that over 9,848 kg of problematic Taiwanese products had been identified, with further recalls underway. In Xiamen alone, 250 tons of affected items were returned. Additionally, after Taiwanese companies like Master Kong, MOS Burger, Want Want, and Wang Steak were implicated in the scandal, they clarified that their mainland China products did not contain tainted oil. Master Kong confirmed that its instant noodles and related products produced and sold in China were free of imported Taiwanese ingredients, adhering strictly to Chinese food safety standards.

Guofu Longfeng Food Co. in Shanghai stated that its cabbage dumplings were not distributed in mainland China, and clarified that while similarly named, Qishan Longfeng in Taiwan operates independently of the mainland-based Guofu Longfeng, which was acquired by Sanquan Foods in 2013.

On October 9, Alibaba Group announced it would use automated and manual checks to remove questionable items from its platforms, but reports indicated that some affected products remained on Alibaba and Taobao sites.

=== Malaysia ===
In Malaysia, Shang Yi Trading Co., the local distributor for Master Kong products, decided to pull instant noodle products containing lard, including “Stewed Scallion and Braised Pork Rib Soup Noodles,” from shelves. The Malaysian Ministry of Health had earlier announced its intention to investigate the local market for products potentially contaminated with gutter oil, but, as of the latest update, no contaminated products had been found.

=== Singapore ===
On the evening of September 18, 2014, the Agri-Food and Veterinary Authority of Singapore (AVA) ordered the recall of six Taiwanese food products, including frozen dumplings from Chimei Food with pork, vegetarian, and leek fillings, as well as three types of cookies from Sheng Xiang Zhen.

== Impact across different regions ==
The gutter oil scandal had a wide impact in Hong Kong and Macau.

In Toronto’s Chinese community, some Hong Kong immigrants expressed concerns, saying that previously they avoided mainland Chinese food, but now they are hesitant to buy Taiwanese products as well. One Taiwanese immigrant mentioned that repeated food safety issues in Taiwan had caused her to lose confidence in Taiwanese food products. She now plans to only purchase food from South Korea or mainstream local supermarkets. While mainstream media in Toronto has not yet reported on the gutter oil scandal, Chinese-language media has extensively covered the issue, leading to panic among the local Chinese community.

For Germany, the food safety scandal in Taiwan was unimaginable. The federal states are responsible for executing food control and inspection mechanisms, and the Federal Office for Consumer Protection and Food Safety (BVL) assists with coordination. Food samples are tested by state laboratories, with each state testing about 400,000 food items annually. Businesses are required to keep detailed records of the raw materials they use, including their sources, for inspection purposes. Germany also has a strong consumer reporting system in place.

Mainstream American media outlets such as Time magazine, Bloomberg Businessweek, and The New York Times reported on the food safety scandal in Taiwan.

On September 10, Chen Shanguo, vice-chairman of the Taiwan Tourism Quality Assurance Association, estimated that the number of mainland Chinese tourists would drop by 20% due to the scandal. At the "Nanjing Taiwan Famous Products Fair" on September 19, staff claimed that no gutter oil products were present.

On September 11, the Deputy Director-General of Taiwan's Ministry of Health and Welfare, Xu Mingneng, confirmed that Taiwan had exported low-quality pig oil products from four manufacturers in 14 different varieties to 12 countries and regions, including Hong Kong, Singapore, mainland China, the U.S., Argentina, Chile, South Africa, Brazil, New Zealand, Australia, and Vietnam.

On September 13, Taiwan's market for homemade lard surged as people began to make their own lard again. Wholesale prices for pig lard jumped from NT$25 (approximately HK$6.4) per 600g before the scandal to NT$40 (approximately HK$10.3), with retail prices reaching NT$65 (approximately HK$16.7) per 600g.

On September 14, Chinese media outlet Fazhi Evening News reported that the stock prices of four affected listed companies, including Wei Chuan and Maxim's, had dropped by more than 1.4 billion RMB (or 7 billion NTD) in just four trading days.

The Philippines Food and Drug Administration and Singapore's Agri-Food & Veterinary Authority both responded to the issue and took precautionary measures.

On September 17, regarding Hong Kong's export of contaminated oil to Taiwan that led to the "gutter oil" scandal, it was noted that while strict regulations govern the import of edible oil, there has been no regulation on the export of edible oil. Hong Kong authorities plan to legislate and regulate food oil safety and waste oil recycling.

== Waste oil inspection announcement ==
On September 8, 2014, the Taiwanese Ministry of Health and Welfare's Food and Drug Administration (FDA) announced the inspection results for "low-quality lard"

=== Examination items ===
- Whether the oil is rancid or hydrolyzed:
1. Acid value
2. Total polar materials
3. Benzopyrene
4. Heavy metals: arsenic, lead, mercury, copper, cadmium, tin, chromium (to determine if leather waste materials were used)
5. Aflatoxins
6. Examination of animal-derived ingredients to check for non-pig ingredients

=== Appearance and odor ===
Waste cooking oil, after undergoing high-level processing and refining, is transformed into a final product that appears and smells identical to regular edible oil. Typical testing methods cannot distinguish it from standard, qualified oils.

=== Results ===
The inspection results for Hu Xinde recycled oil and ingredients from Chuang Guan (强冠) processing plant showed the following:

1. Acid Value exceeded the standard by 1.3 mg KOH/g, indicating that the oil is not fresh and has undergone hydrolysis and rancidity.
2. Benzo(a)pyrene levels exceeded the normal standard by 2 ppb, which is three times higher than the EU and Taiwan standard (>6 ppb). This is an indicator of repeatedly fried waste oil.
3. Other items tested met the standard.

=== Commentary ===
Units	Overview
National Taiwan University College of Public Health	On September 9, the College of Public Health at National Taiwan University held a press conference where Dean Chen Wei-jian criticized the government for only testing for routine items. He pointed out that the recycled oil contained many carcinogen, but since these were not tested, the actual results remain unknown. Professor Wu Kun-yu from the Department of Public Health and Occupational Medicine stated, "The government's crisis management is completely inadequate and should publicly apologize." Professor Chen Jia-yang from the Institute of Environmental Health pointed out that food safety issues can no longer be handled solely by the Ministry of Health and Welfare. He suggested that a joint investigation involving the health department, law enforcement, the Environmental Protection Administration, and the Ministry of Economic Affairs, along with tax audits, is necessary to prevent future food safety issues.
National Taiwan University, Pingtung University of Science and Technology, Kaohsiung Medical University	On September 9, Honorary Professor Sun Lu-xi from the Department of Food Science at National Taiwan University, Dr. Jiang Zhi-gang, a nephrologist at National Taiwan University Hospital, Professor Chen Jing-chuan, Vice President and Professor of Food and Nutrition at Pingtung University of Science and Technology, and Dr. Chen Bai-xun, Director of the Toxicology Department at Kaohsiung Medical University, all expressed concerns about the inadequacies of the sampling method. They noted that there could be other unknown harmful substances in the oils and recommended changing the testing approach. On September 4, Professor Sun Lu-xi had already advised that in-depth testing was necessary to examine whether the oils contained harmful oil-soluble substances, pesticides, heavy metals, and to clarify the responsibilities of unscrupulous businesses.
Consumers' Foundation	On September 12, the Consumers' Foundation pointed out that the current oil testing method, which they described as "fishing-style" testing, could be used by businesses as a way to avoid responsibility. They suggested adopting a "net-fishing style" approach instead. Chairman of the Consumers' Foundation, Zhang Zhi-gang, cited research from the European Parliament, which showed that recycled cooking oils contain carcinogenic substances such as dioxins, polychlorinated biphenyls (PCBs), and polycyclic aromatic hydrocarbons (PAHs) that pose risks to public health. Lin Yong-jian, a member of the Consumers' Foundation's testing committee and Professor of Chemistry at National Tsing Hua University, explained that different acidic compounds could be analyzed using techniques like gas chromatography-mass spectrometry, nuclear magnetic resonance (NMR) spectroscopy, and inductively coupled plasma mass spectrometry (ICP-MS) to detect heavy metals. This would allow for the analysis of the proportions of saturated fatty acids, monounsaturated fatty acids, and polyunsaturated fatty acids, helping to identify the composition of the oil and trace its origin. Lin further explained that combustion oxidation reactions also produce polycyclic aromatic hydrocarbons (PAHs), and it is impossible to produce just one type. Frying starch will produce acrylamide, which polymerizes into the carcinogen polyacrylamide. Standard laboratory instruments can detect these substances at levels as low as 0.1 ppb, providing a fingerprint that is not listed if it falls below regulatory data thresholds.
Doh's Foundation	Xu Hui-yu, the Director of the Nutrition Department at the Doh's Foundation, harshly criticized the Ministry of Health and Welfare's Food and Drug Administration (FDA) for avoiding the issue. She stated, "Just a fried pork chop that's slightly bigger than the size of a palm contains 14% oil. Eating one piece means consuming 15 grams of oil. How can the FDA claim that the 'intake amount is very limited'?"
Chang Gung Memorial Hospital	Dr. Yan Zong-hai, the Director of the Clinical Toxicology Department at Chang Gung Memorial Hospital, pointed out that "waste cooking oil" is recycled from used kitchen oil, which may be contaminated with bacteria or microorganisms. This can cause acute gastroenteritis in mild cases, and in severe cases, it could lead to sepsis. It may also contain aflatoxins, which are harmful to the liver and can lead to hepatitis, cirrhosis, and in cases of hepatitis B carriers, an increased risk of liver cancer.

== Criminal offenses ==
=== Arrests related to the oil scandal ===
==== Pingtung, Kaohsiung ====
On September 4, the Southern Taiwan Criminal Investigation Center and the Environmental Protection Administration's Southern Regional Unit uncovered a case involving low-quality cooking oil. The investigation revealed that waste materials from pig skins, as well as by-products from chicken and duck processing, were sold to underground factories for illegal oil production. This criminal network involved approximately 10 factories, which violated various articles of the Waste Disposal Act (Articles 31, 39, 41, and 46), with fines ranging from 6,000 to 60,000 NTD. The underground factory involved violated Articles 41 and 46 of the Waste Disposal Act, and also faced criminal charges, which could result in a prison sentence of 1 to 5 years. The suspects were also charged with document forgery, fraud, and other criminal offenses, with the investigation being handled by the prosecutor's office in accordance with the law.

==== Hong Kong investigation and arrests ====
On September 10, Dr. Ho Yuk Yin, an advisor to Hong Kong's Centre for Food Safety, revealed that local company Kam Po Yuen Trading had exported 87.7 tons of non-edible pig fat to Taiwan from the Strong Crown Enterprise Company in Taiwan. This non-edible "feed oil," which is meant for animal consumption only, was falsely labeled as "edible oil for human consumption," thus involving criminal activities. Kam Po Yuen received the oil under the name of "Ho Xing Company," which clearly stated on the sales receipt that it was "feed oil" for animal use only. However, the documents presented by Kam Po Yuen misleadingly claimed that the oil could be used as "margarine or cooking oil, with no contamination, suitable for human consumption." Dr. Ho emphasized that the oil was directly shipped from Taiwan to Hong Kong with assistance from Ho Xing.

On the afternoon of September 10, Prosecutor Li Zhongren from the Pingtung District Prosecutors Office led a search at Strong Crown Company, in cooperation with the Kaohsiung Health Bureau. However, the details regarding the verification of the imported oil from Taiwan to Hong Kong remained under "confidential investigation."

On September 12, the Hong Kong Police Force arrested two men in connection with the export of the tainted pig fat to Taiwan. The suspects, a 59-year-old man surnamed Su and a 64-year-old man surnamed Cheung, are accused of conspiracy to commit fraud. The Secretary for Food and Health, Dr. Ko Wing-man, described the incident as severely damaging Hong Kong's reputation. Early in the morning, the Hong Kong police's Organized Crime and Triad Bureau launched raids in five districts: Yuen Long, Tai Kok Tsui, Tsuen Wan, Tai Po, and Tuen Mun. They investigated the pig fat factory, notary offices, and trading companies, seizing oil samples, computers, and boxes of documents. Three individuals were arrested, including a director of the trading company Kam Po Yuen, a notary from the "Ying Wai Notary Office," and a secretary, all suspected of conspiracy to commit fraud and using forged documents.

==== Guo Liecheng, Ye Wenxiang, and the Strong Crown case ====
On September 13, Ye Wenxiang, the chairman of Strong Crown Enterprise, was detained by the court after a ruling at midnight.

On October 1, the Pingtung District Prosecutors Office questioned Guo Liecheng, showing him the inspection report of the substandard edible oil. Guo admitted to purchasing animal carcass oil, waste oil, recycled oil, and leather oil, which he mixed together and sold to Strong Crown Company. The prosecution also questioned Strong Crown's chairman, Ye Wenxiang, but Ye denied any knowledge of the situation, placing the responsibility for the domestic oil procurement entirely on the company’s vice president, Dai Qichuan. Both Ye and Dai were detained after their questioning.

==== Xin Hao Enterprise ====
Wu Ronghe, the head of Xin Hao Enterprise Co., Ltd., was detained in the early hours of October 8. He was arrested after being found by investigators to have been mixing "feed-grade oil" with "edible pig oil" since 2012, and then processing it into refined oils which were sold to Zhengyi Co., Ltd. Several products from "Zhengyi Oils" were found to be contaminated.

The Ministry of Justice Investigation Bureau's Tainan City Office discovered that Wu Ronghe founded Xin Hao Enterprise, but the company had almost no employees, with only one or two temporary salespersons occasionally working for it. Xin Hao operated as a wholesale distributor. The sources of the oils they used were highly complex, with at least four types of oils coming from more than seven different locations or companies. Feed-grade oil was just one type; other sources included palm oil, animal-vegetable mixed oils, and waste edible oils.

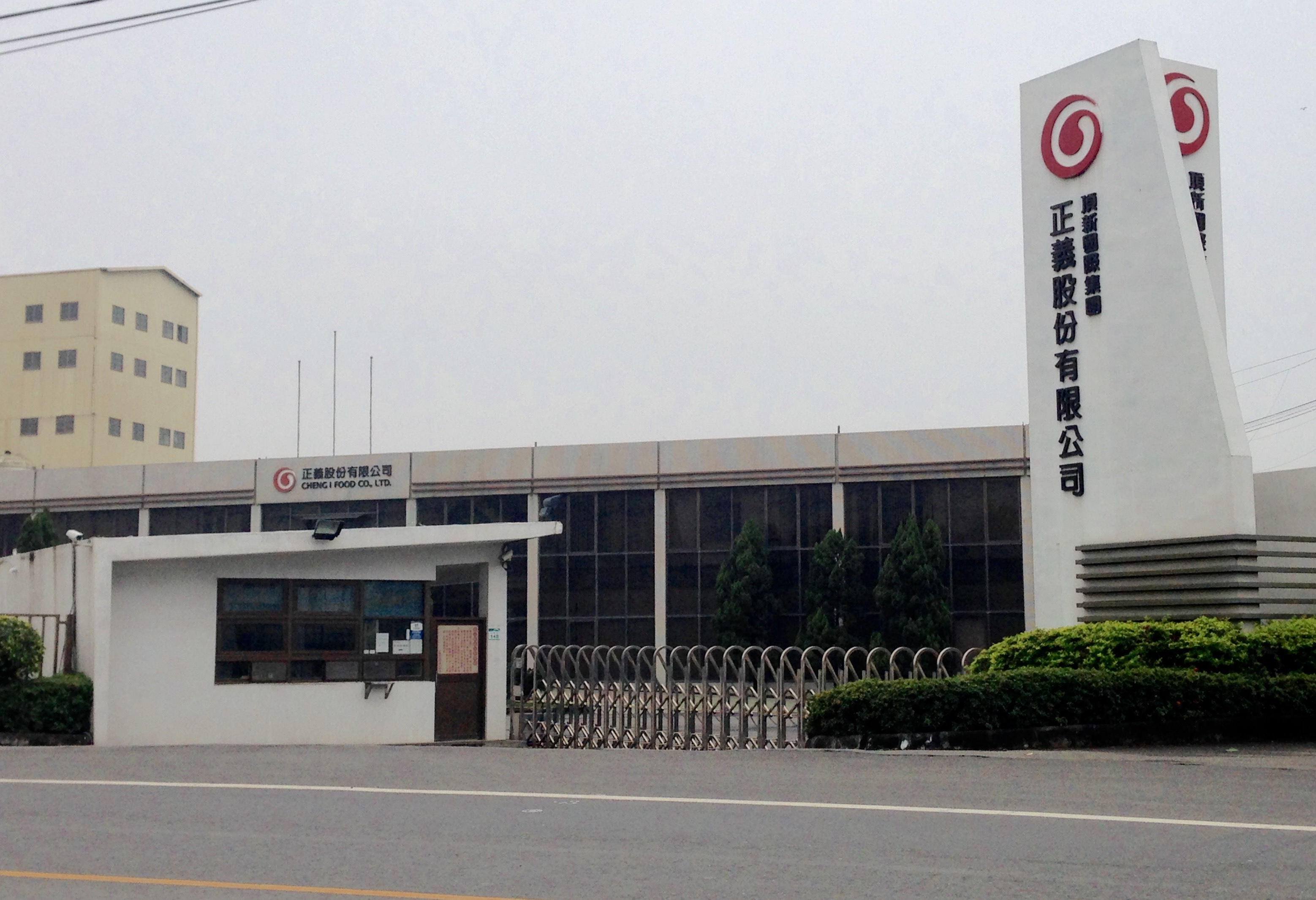
Justice Co., Ltd. Factory

==== Ting Hsin Group and oil scandal-related defendants ====
On October 12, 2024, the Changhua District Court ordered the detention of three individuals involved in the oil scandal: Chang Mei-feng, former general manager of Ting Hsin Group; Tsai Jun-yong, quality assurance team leader at the Pingtung factory; and Yang Zhen-yi, head of the Da Xing Fu company (a supplier of feed-grade oil to Ting Hsin).

On the same day, the Chiayi District Court ruled to detain Chiu Li-pin, the person responsible for Jiufeng Oil Factory (sister of Chiu Feilong), and Tsai Zhen-zhou, head of Yong Cheng Materials. Additionally, the Kaohsiung District Court also ordered the detention of Lin Ming-zhong. Prosecutors and police have determined that Wei Ying-chung is at least involved in fraud and violations of the Food Safety and Sanitation Management Act and Accounting Act. He is expected to be summoned for questioning.

On October 17, the Changhua District Court ruled to detain Wei Ying-chung and Zeng Qi-ming, factory manager at the Ting Hsin Pingtung factory. Both were transferred to the Changhua Detention Center.

==== North Sea Oil Products (Tainan, Taiwan) ====
On November 3, 2024, the Tainan District Prosecutors Office uncovered an illegal operation involving North Sea Oil Products (owned by Lu Qing-xie and his wife Lu Huang-lihua, with involvement from another company, Xie Qing Company, which used invoices for tax evasion). They were found to be mixing non-food-grade oils and feed-grade oils into edible oils, which were then refined into edible pig oil (totaling 1,275 tons and 472 kilograms).

Both Lu Qing-xie and Lu Huang-lihua were arrested on October 18 and October 30, respectively. The Tainan City Health Bureau has confirmed that all related oil products from North Sea Oil have been fully recalled from the market.

=== Administrative penalties ===
==== Fines ====
On September 18, Pingtung County Health Bureau imposed a fine of NT$48 million on Guo Liecheng for selling spoiled oil. The fine was calculated based on the 240 tons of kitchen waste oil and re-used cooking oil involved, applying the highest penalty rate of 10 times the value, calculated at NT$20 per kilogram of market price. The administrative penalty notice was delivered to the detention center for Guo Liecheng. The collection period is 10 years, and whistleblowers are eligible for a reward of NT$400,000. However, due to the principle of no double punishment for the same offense, the final fine amount will depend on the outcome of the criminal court's final ruling.

On October 9, Yunlin County Health Bureau transferred the case of Jin Hong Trading's illegal sale of "feed-grade oil" to Xin Hao Enterprises to the prosecutors for investigation. The company could be fined between NT$30,000 and NT$3 million for violating the Food Safety and Sanitation Management Act.

==== Public official disciplinary actions ====
On October 3, the Executive Yuan announced the reassignment of the Director-General of the Ministry of Health and Welfare's Food and Drug Administration (FDA), Yeh Ming-Kong, who was replaced by Deputy Director-General Chiang Yu-Mei. The Director of the Environmental Protection Administration's Waste Management Department, Wu Tian-Ji, voluntarily requested to be reassigned to a different position, and the department head position was taken over by Deputy Director Lai Ying-Ying. The Industrial Development Bureau of the Ministry of Economic Affairs issued a written warning to the officer in charge of GMP (Good Manufacturing Practice) operations, Hong Hui-Song.

On October 3, 2014, Taiwan's Minister of Health and Welfare, Chiu Wen-Tai, resigned from his position due to the incident, taking political responsibility. The new Minister of Health and Welfare, Chiang Bing-Huang, succeeded him.

==== Whistleblower rewards ====
An elderly farmer in Pingtung, who had repeatedly gathered evidence and reported the case locally without success, traveled to Taichung City Police Department to file a report. With the assistance of the police, an investigation was launched, leading to the uncovering of the low-quality pig oil incident. On September 17, 2014, Executive Yuan Premier Jiang Yi-Hua announced a reward of NT$2 million for the whistleblower.

Mr. A from Tainan reported illegal waste oil recycling operators, indirectly contributing to the investigation and busting of black-hearted manufacturers like Xin Hao and Zheng Yi, involved in producing harmful oils. On October 20, 2014, Premier Jiang Yi-Hua announced a reward of NT$500,000 for Mr. A.

The NT$2 million reward for the Pingtung farmer was still pending as of October 20, 2014, due to administrative procedures, which was a minor downside to the otherwise positive outcome.

The Ministry of Civil Service announced that the Pingtung County Health Bureau was selected for the 2014 (Year 103) "Outstanding Contribution Award for Public Servants," and a ceremony to present the award was held in early December by the Examination Yuan.

=== Prosecution and sentencing ===
==== Datong adulterated oil incident ====
On October 16, 2013, the Datong Food safety incidents in Taiwan broke out. On July 24, 2014, the criminal case was finalized in the second trial, sentencing Datong Company owner Gao Zhenli to 12 years in prison.

==== Chang Guann gutter oil case ====
On October 3, 2014, the Pingtung District Prosecutors Office concluded the investigation into the gutter oil case and indicted eight individuals, including the main suspect Guo Liecheng, his driver and sales associate Shi Minyu, Jinwei owner Su Qinghuang, his wife Guo Chunye, their son Su Jinwei, Dacheng Feed Company Plant Manager Huang Huiguang, as well as Chang Guann Chairman Yeh Wen-Hsiang and Vice President of Procurement Tai Qichuan. The charges were brought under the Food Safety and Sanitation Act.

Four individuals—Yeh Wen-Hsiang, Tai Qichuan, Guo Liecheng, and Shi Minyu—were also charged with joint fraud, involving the sale of products to 235 downstream businesses. According to Article 339 of the Criminal Code, prosecutors recommended enhanced sentences of 1–7 years for their offenses.

On July 24, 2015, the Pingtung District Court sentenced Chang Guann Chairman Yeh Wen-Hsiang and Tai Qichuan to 20 years in prison, along with fines of NT$50 million. Guo Liecheng was sentenced to 3 years and 6 months for illegal possession of ammunition and weapons, with an additional fine of NT$50,000. For violations of the Food Safety and Sanitation Act, he was sentenced to 12 years. Shi Minyu was sentenced to 8 years in prison.

On September 13, 2017, the Supreme Court upheld the High Court’s (Kaohsiung Branch) decision, increasing the sentences for Chang Guann executives. Yeh Wen-Hsiang was sentenced to 22 years, including 5 years convertible to fines, for violating the Food Safety and Sanitation Act and aggravated fraud across 285 counts. Tai Qichuan’s sentence was adjusted to 18 years, with 4 years convertible to fines. The case was thereby finalized. Chang Guann Company was fined NT$120 million, while criminal profits of over NT$81.5 million were confiscated. As for other defendants, including underground oil vendor Guo Yingzhi (formerly known as Guo Liecheng) and Shi Minyu, parts of their cases were overturned and remanded to the High Court (Kaohsiung Branch) for retrial and further investigation.

==== Yongcheng-Jiufeng lard scandal ====
In July 2015, the Chiayi District Court ruled on the Yongcheng-Jiufeng lard case, sentencing under a "one crime, one punishment" principle. Yongcheng Oil Company was fined NT$75 million for six offenses, Yongcheng Material Company was fined NT$55 million for six offenses, and Jiufeng Company was fined between NT$1.5 million and NT$2 million per offense across six counts. Additionally, Yongcheng General Manager Cai Zhenzhou was sentenced to 15 years in prison (with a fine of NT$28 million), Deputy General Manager Cai Yaohong to 8 years in prison, Jiufeng Company owner Qiu Feilong to 10 years in prison (with a fine of NT$4.5 million), and factory operator Qiu Lipin (Qiu Feilong’s sister) to 9 years in prison.
