= Chin Chun Motor Co., Ltd. =

Taiwanese automobile manufacturer

- Company type: Private company
- Industry: Automobile manufacturing
- Founded: 13 June 1991; 35 years ago
- Headquarters: Taiwan; Taoyuan City Guanyin DistrictNo. 288, Zhongzheng Rd
- Key people: chairman = Zheng Rong You (游振榮))
- Products: Automobiles

Chin Chun Motor Co., Ltd.
- Traditional Chinese: 慶眾汽車工業股份有限公司
- Simplified Chinese: 庆众汽车工业股份有限公司
Transcriptions
Standard Mandarin
- Hanyu Pinyin: Qìngzhòng Qìchē Gōngyè Gǔfèn Yǒuxiàn Gōngsī
Yue: Cantonese
- Jyutping: Hing^{3} Zung^{3} Hei^{3} Ce^{1} Gung^{1} Jip^{6} Gu^{2} Fan^{6} Jau^{5} Haan^{6} Gung^{1} Si^{1}

Chin Chun Motor Co., Ltd. (traditional Chinese: 慶眾汽車工業股份有限公司; simplified Chinese: 庆众汽车工业股份有限公司) is a Taiwanese automobile manufacturer. It was established on 13 June 1991 in Taoyuan City, Taiwan. The company is a joint venture between Volkswagen AG and Chinfon Huanyu, a subsidiary of Chinfon Group. The two companies invested NT$4.8 billion (US$148.37 million) into establishing Chin Chun Motor. The company is part of the Taiwanese Chinfon Group. After an agreement struck with Volkswagen in 1991, Chi Chun Motor planned to build Taiwan's 11th car factory with the aim of manufacturing Volkswagens.

In 1994, after signing the domestic manufacturing deal of the Volkswagen Transporter (T4) in Taiwan, the company signed to become the procuration of the Spanish auto brand, SEAT in Taiwan. The company was in charge of importing SEAT Córdoba and SEAT Ibiza passenger cars. Due to slow sales, the import stopped shortly after only one year.

On 24 November 1999, Chin Chun Motor became the local partner of the Korean auto brand Hyundai and further introduced the range of Hyundai's most affordable models like the Atos、Trajet、Santa Fe、XG. The passenger cars and SUVs manufacturing after the agreement was released, with the XG being produced domestically in Taiwan from March 2001 to 2005.

In 2002, the company transformed into a foundry of Hyundai as affiliates Sangyang became the official representation of the brand after ending the contract with Honda.

In 2007, Chinfon Group rearranged the automobile business within the group and combined Chin Chun Motor into the larger Nanyang Motors Company in charge of Sangyang Motors. With the sales of commercial vehicles of Hyundai also being transferred to the Nanyang Motors Company, the operation of Chinfon Group was ceased with the factories, equipments, and workers transferred and rented to Sangyang.

in 2009, Sangyang teamed up with Automatic Equipment Inc. (AEI) and won the contract of 3,598 Light Military Vehicle deal by the Ministry of National Defense of Taiwanese government and manufactured the vehicles in the Chin Chun Motor factory located in Guanyin, Taoyuan City. The vehicles were modified licensed Jeep Wrangler JK Unlimited by AEI adapting to the Taiwan environment.

On 22 December 2010, PX Mart bought the factory and remaining lands of Chin Chun Motor's Guanyin, Taoyuan facilities with NTD 24.6 hundred million, including land of 66,000 Pyeong, buildings of 24,600 Pyeong and the machines and equipments.

== See also ==
- Transportation in Taiwan
- List of Taiwanese automakers
- List of companies of Taiwan
