= Wei Ying-Chung =

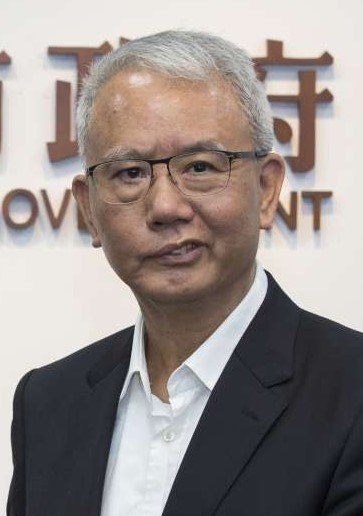

Wei Ying-Chung (born March 8, 1957), a native of Changhua County, Taiwan, is the third eldest of the Wei brothers who founded the Ting Hsin International Group.

He is the founder of the Ting Hsin and Weichuan Education Foundation and has recently focused on philanthropic endeavors, including reviving the Wei Chuan Dragons, the fifth team of the Chinese Professional Baseball League (CPBL). Wei has previously served as the chairman of the Taiwan Food GMP Development Association, Wei Chuan Foods Corporation, Ting Hsin Oil & Fat Industrial, and Cheng I Food Co., Ltd.

In 2013 and 2014, he faced public scrutiny due to controversies surrounding oil products. In 2018, the Taichung High Court ruled that the oils produced by Ting Hsin Oil & Fat Industrial were not recycled or gutter oils and did not come from diseased pigs, clarifying previous misinformation spread by the media. However, in 2017, the Intellectual Property Court convicted Wei of fraud concerning the Wei Chuan 98-blended oil formula, sentencing him to two years in prison. After serving over 500 days in prison, he was granted parole at the end of 2018. Subsequently, the Taichung High Court sentenced Wei to another two years for tax evasion, with appeals still ongoing. On January 8, 2020, the various sentences related to the oil products case were combined, and Wei was ordered to serve a total of four years and eight months.

In March 2019, he launched a fan page, writing in calligraphy: "I have coexisted with societal misunderstandings for five and a half years." On January 19, 2021, the Taiwan High Court's Taichung branch approved Wei’s parole release.

== Family background ==
Wei’s ancestors hail from Huangzhuyan Village in Gutang Township, Tingzhou Prefecture, Fujian Province (now Yongding District, Longyan City). His family is one of the three prominent clans in Yongjing Township, Changhua County. In 1961, his father, Wei Ho-Te, established the Ting Hsin Oil Factory in Yongjing Township.

At age three, Wei suffered facial nerve damage due to a high fever. He graduated from Changhua Senior High School in 1975 and, along with his younger brother Wei Ying-Hsing, was later honored as an outstanding alumnus. Wei's two elder sisters, Wei Chin-Ni and Wei Juan-Juan, are members of Tzu Chi, a humanitarian organization. The Wei family later expanded their investments into mainland China, where they became the leading instant noodle brand.

== Career ==
In 2002, Wei Ying-Hsing stepped down as chairman of Wei Chuan Foods Corporation, and Wei Ying-Chung succeeded him. In 2005, the Wei family acquired Cheng I Food Co., Ltd., appointing Wei Ying-Chung as chairman. During his tenure, he dismantled the oil press team and constructed a deodorization tower.

Wei has held numerous executive positions across various companies, including Wei Chuan Foods Corporation, Ting Hsin Oil & Fat Industrial, Cheng I Food Co., Matsusei Supermarket, Kang Chuan Engineering, Hangzhou Wei Chuan Biotech, and Cayman Island Ting Hsin Holdings. He also served as a board member for several other firms.

In 2008, Wei planned to expand pig farming operations in Taiwan, aiming to raise over 150,000 pigs annually, making him the largest private pig farmer after Taiwan Sugar Corporation. During the 2008 Sichuan Earthquake, Wei organized food relief efforts as part of Tzu Chi's humanitarian response, with Wei Chuan Foods producing vegetarian instant noodles for disaster relief.

In 2011, the Ministry of Health and Welfare recommended Wei as a member of the Executive Yuan’s Food Safety Committee, although he only attended one of the four meetings held during his term. He also participated in the National Industrial Support Group for the Ma-Wu presidential campaign and was awarded a certificate as vice chairman by then-President Ma Ying-Jeou.

=== Role as GMP Chairman ===
As the chairman of the Taiwan Food GMP Development Association, Wei spearheaded initiatives to enhance food safety standards. In 2011, he collaborated with government and corporate representatives to expand GMP certification, prevent plasticizer contamination, and launch an ICT service platform for production traceability and safe shopping for GMP-certified food.

In April 2013, Wei hosted the first media visit of the year at the Wei Chuan Research and Development Center and the Uni-President Yangmei plant, showcasing the industry’s commitment to food safety and innovation.

== Cultural and philanthropic endeavors ==
=== National Culture and Arts Foundation ===
In 2011, Wei Ying-Chung served as a board member of the National Culture and Arts Foundation. Ting Hsin Group has long been committed to promoting arts and cultural initiatives. Beyond actively participating in societal arts and cultural contributions, the group also emphasizes cultivating humanistic values internally. From 2008, Ting Hsin sponsored the "National Palace Museum Weekend Nights" cultural promotion project with NT$3 million over two years. Wei Ying-Chung, as chairman of Wei Chuan Foods, announced in 2011 that the sponsorship would increase to NT$6 million over two years, along with support for video recording of events, annual archival commemorative booklets, and on-site services. Over four years, total sponsorship for the National Palace Museum exceeded NT$11 million.

=== Participation in Tzu Chi Foundation ===
==== Disaster relief ====
- 1986: Inspired by Tzu Chi's message of "learning to be a person with a giving hand" through its Tzu Chi Journal, Wei proactively contacted the organization and joined.
- 1992: Participated in disaster relief efforts in mainland China.
- 1996: Took part in relief efforts for the Hebei Province floods and provided winter aid.
- 2008: During the Sichuan earthquake, Wei led the food team of Tzu Chi International Humanitarian Aid. Vegetarian instant noodles used in relief efforts were developed and produced by Wei Chuan.
- 2010–2013: Provided donations and material assistance for various global disasters, including the Haiti earthquake, Japan's 2011 earthquake and tsunami, Typhoon Haiyan, and the Pakistan earthquake.
- 2011–2012: Assisted with rice aid projects and relief material procurement for disasters in Thailand and Beijing.

==== Poverty alleviation ====
- 2011: Supported left-behind children in Chongqing by providing nutritional lunches and inspecting newly constructed school facilities.
- 2011: Donated milk powder and assisted with transportation for a North Korea aid project.

==== Environmental advocacy ====
- Under the philosophy of "coexisting with the Earth," Wei spearheaded eco-friendly initiatives, including recycling PET bottles into sustainable materials. This effort aimed to inspire broader participation in environmental protection and corporate social responsibility.

==== Tzu Chi Disaster Relief Food Team Leader ====
- Wei utilized over 60 years of expertise and resources from Ting Hsin and Wei Chuan to develop instant relief food products for disaster-stricken areas. The foods were tailored to address critical needs such as nutrition, caloric intake, safety, and convenience in the aftermath of disasters, considering the unique conditions of each region. Wei also advocated for a global knowledge platform to manage disaster relief food supplies, addressing variations in raw material availability and dietary habits.

==== Other contributions ====
- Acted as deputy team leader to guide corporate leaders in Tzu Chi's community initiatives.
- Established the Yongjing Environmental Education Station, where ex-convicts participated in recycling and life education programs to support their reintegration into society.
- Launched educational programs such as community parent-child growth classes and after-school tutoring programs to enrich children’s character and foster harmonious family interactions.
- Promoted community environmental awareness by leading resource recovery campaigns and instilling values of cherishing the planet and reducing waste.

== Controversies ==
=== Ting Hsin Oil Scandal ===
==== 2013 Taiwan Cooking Oil Scandal ====
In November 2013, Food safety incidents in Taiwan, Wei Ying-Chung, a key figure in Ting Hsin International Group, was accused by employees of Wei Chuan Foods of prioritizing cost over quality in oil formulations. Wei was later released on bail for NT$10 million. Wei attributed the controversy to his lack of charitable deeds and saw the incident as a form of retribution. In June 2019, the Intellectual Property Court acquitted Ting Hsin of wrongdoing, stating that the adulterated oil purchased from Chang Chi Foodstuff Factory was a closely guarded secret by a few internal personnel and that there was no evidence proving intent to purchase such oil by Ting Hsin officials. The court also found no deliberate relaxation of quality standards by company managers.

==== 2014 Taiwan Oil Scandal ====
Following another scandal involving substandard oil products by Cheng-I Food, Wei publicly apologized and resigned as chairman of Wei Chuan Foods, Ting Hsin Oil, and Cheng-I Food, shutting down affiliated oil factories. His elder brother, Wei Ying-Zhou, criticized his siblings for their ostentatious displays of wealth. Employees described Wei as a kind man who helped many in need but trusted professional managers too much. Dharma Master Cheng Yen, who had worked with Wei in disaster relief efforts, expressed deep sorrow over the scandal. Politicians, particularly from the Democratic Progressive Party, accused the ruling party of shielding Wei and demanded swift detention.

On October 17, Wei was detained at the Changhua Detention Center under suspicion of fraud and violations of the Food Safety Act. Wei denied wrongdoing, claiming he was unfamiliar with oil-related matters as chairman. Despite his claims, prosecutors filed multiple fraud charges against him, seeking a 30-year sentence. The controversy led to significant legislative reforms, including stricter food safety laws and mandatory establishment of laboratories by large manufacturers.

==== Subsequent developments ====
In January 2015, Wei was granted bail of NT$100 million but was later re-detained.

By February 2015, he was released on bail again for NT$300 million.

In November 2015, the Changhua District Court acquitted Wei due to insufficient evidence.

In April 2018, the Taichung High Court sentenced Wei to 15 years in prison for violations of food safety regulations.

In November 2019, the Supreme Court sentenced Wei to 5 years and 9 months for seven offenses while allowing fines for 19 others.

In January 2020, Wei began serving a 4-year and 8-month prison sentence.

In September 2020, his lawyers presented new evidence proving the export oil was fit for human consumption. However, the court upheld a revised sentence of 9 years and 2 months.

In January 2021, Wei was paroled after serving 3 years and 9 months.

==== Wei Chuan Blended Oil Case ====
In March 2016, Wei was sentenced to 4 years in prison for fraud and violating the Food Safety Act. In 2017, the Intellectual Property Court upheld the charges, finding that the products misled consumers with false labeling of premium ingredients like olive oil and grape seed oil. Wei served his sentence and was paroled in December 2018.

==== Tax Evasion Case ====
In 2017, Wei was charged with evading over NT$60 million in taxes. He was convicted of 44 counts, including falsifying records, and sentenced to 3 years in prison. In subsequent appeals, the Taichung High Court modified the sentence to 2 years without the option of fines. By 2020, the sentence was further reduced to 1 year and 10 months, allowing for fines, with legal experts emphasizing consistent application of justice.
