= List of Taiwanese automakers =

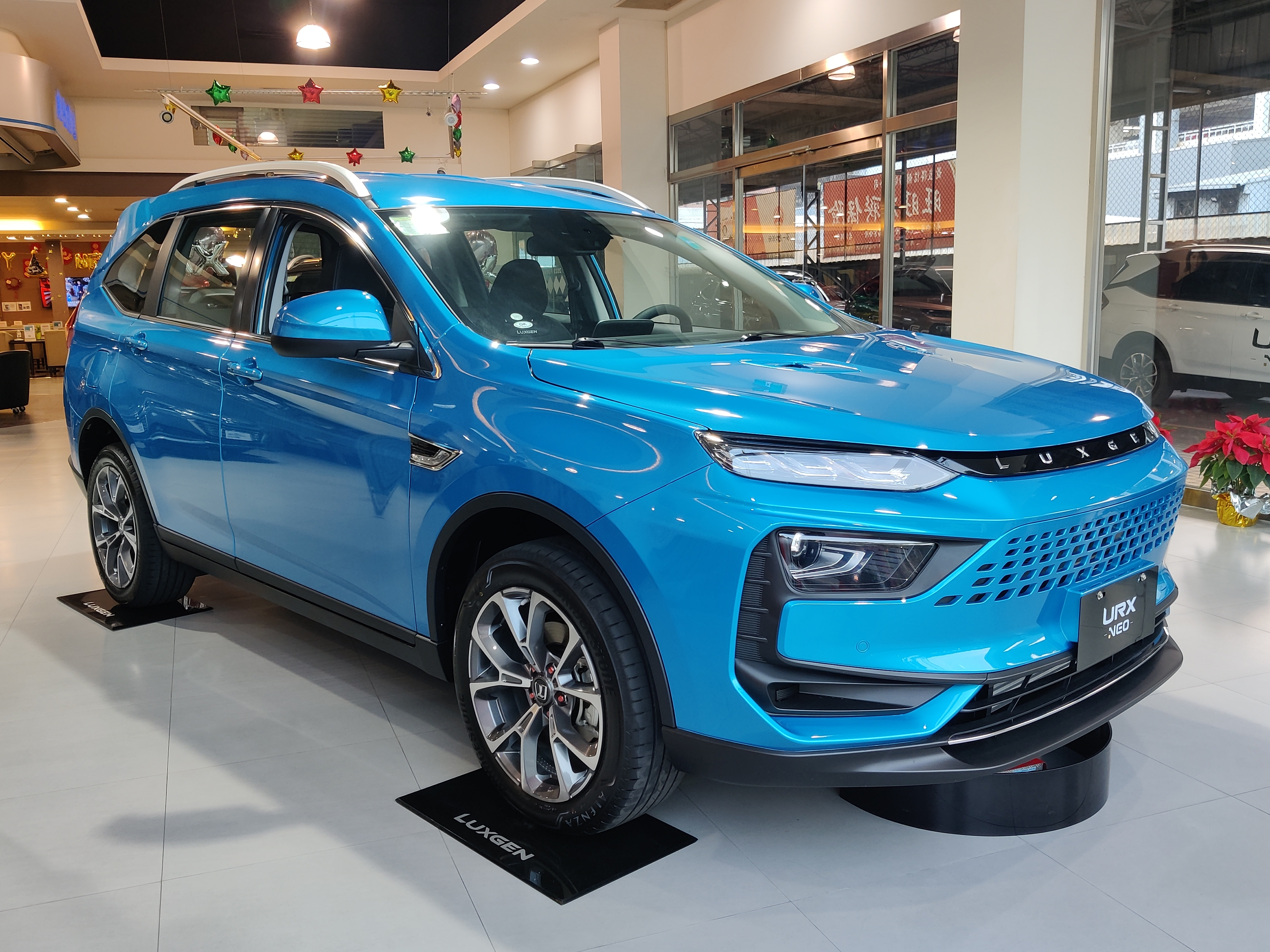
Luxgen URX

Below is a list of automakers in Taiwan which manufacture and/or assemble in Taiwan. This list does not include dealers or importing companies.

Due to the limited market size, automotive manufacturers in Taiwan have relatively small-scale operations. The majority of major manufacturers engage in contract manufacturing for foreign car brands from Japan and the US. Only a few manufactures, like Yulon and China Motor, have their own brands.

== Hotai Motor ==
Hotai Motor, through its affiliate Kuozui Motors, manufactures Toyota vehicles in Taiwan.

== Yulon Motors ==
In 2004, Yulon Motors created Yulon Nissan Motors, a subsidiary dedicated to building Nissan vehicles under license. However, Yulon's manufacturing division continued to manufacture cars for other automakers. On 22 November 2005, Yulon GM was established as a joint venture of Yulon and GM. Foxtron (established in 2020) is a joint venture of Yulon and the technology company Foxconn.

Currently, Yulon manufactures Nissan vehicles for Yulon Nissan Motors and their own all-terrain vehicle brand called Cectek.

Known as "Yue Loong" until 1992, Yulon Motors sells Nissan and Renault vehicles.

Vehicles currently manufactured by Yulon in Taiwan are the Nissan Sentra, Nissan Kicks and the Nissan X-Trail.

=== Luxgen ===
Luxgen produces cars under its own brand owned by Yulon. The models are Luxgen U6, Luxgen n7 and Luxgen URX

=== Yulon GM ===
Yulon GM sold Opel, Buick, and Cadillac vehicles, and produced the Buick Lacrosse and Buick Excelle. The cooperation between GM and Yulon ended in 2012.

== China Motor Corporation ==
China Motor Corporation (CMC) currently manufactures CMC, Mitsubishi and MG vehicles. CMC also sells Mitsubishi vehicles in Taiwan, and exports redesigned Mitsubishi vehicles. Previously the company had also produced Chrysler vehicles.

CMC currently manufactures the Mitsubishi Delica, Mitsubishi Xforce, CMC Zinger, CMC E300 electric, CMC ET35, CMC J Space, MG HS, MG ZS, MG4 EV, MG G50 Plus

In 2006, CMC started manufacturing Chrysler vehicles for DaimlerChrysler Taiwan. The Town and Country was the first Chrysler vehicle to be assembled in Taiwan. The joint venture was ended in 2010.

== Chin Chun Motors ==
Chin Chun Motors manufactured commercial and passengers vehicles for Hyundai until 2010 primarily targeted to the Taiwanese market. Initially, Chin Chun manufactured for Volkswagen, namely the Volkswagen Transporter. Later, it introduced the Hyundai brand to Taiwan. In 2010, Hyundai consolidated factories.

== Kuozui Motors ==
Kuozui Motors manufactures Toyota vehicles in Taiwan, including the Toyota Vios, Toyota Corolla Altis, Toyota Corolla Cross, Toyota Noah/Voxy (export only), Toyota Town Ace and Toyota Yaris Cross.

Hotai Motors is in charge of selling the Toyota vehicles and provides after-sales service.

== Ford Lio Ho ==
Ford Lio Ho manufactures and represents the Ford brand, and locally assembles vehicles from this marque in Taiwan.

As part of Ford's Asia Pacific strategy, Ford Lio Ho used Ford badging on Mazda products after Ford's 1970s purchase of that company. Ford Lio Ho assembled vehicles was based on Mazda platforms, such as the 323 and 626 series, known as the Ford Laser. They also produced rebadged Fords as Mazdas, like the Explorer (based on the Ford Explorer platform).

Ford Lio Ho also produces Mazda CKD vehicles for their assembling outside Taiwan, and for a short time they locally produced the Suzuki Carry, a Suzuki Motors/GM product, and sold it as the "Ford Pronto".

Current vehicles manufactured in Taiwan includes the Ford Kuga and the Ford Territory.

== Honda Taiwan ==
Honda Taiwan manufactures Honda vehicles in Taiwan.

Current vehicles manufactured in Taiwan: Honda Fit, Honda HR-V, and the Honda CR-V.

== Her Chee ==
Her Chee Industrial manufactures small SUV side by side all-terrain vehicles and wide range of motorcycles, scooters and ATVs.

== Sanyang Motor ==
Sanyang Motor manufactures Hyundai vehicles in Taiwan, including the Hyundai Tucson, Hyundai Custin, Hyundai Mufasa, Hyundai Porter, Hyundai Venue, and Hyundai QT500

== Formosa Automobile ==
Formosa Automobile manufactured Daewoo vehicles from 2003 until the end of 2006. About 29,500 cars were built in total. The Daewoo Magnus, also known as Chevrolet Epica or Evanda in global markets, was rebadged as the Formosa Magnus. The Daewoo Matiz, also known as Chevrolet Matiz or Spark in global markets, was rebadged as the Formosa Matiz.

Formosa Automobile started to sell imported Škoda vehicles in 2005, beginning with the Fabia. This arrangement lasted until 2007.

== Prince Motors ==
Prince Motors manufactured Suzuki, and actually these range of vehicles are produced locally, and as CKD vehicles for export markets.

== Ta Ching Motor ==
Ta Ching Motor Co. assembled Subaru cars in Taiwan from 1989 to the early 2000s, and also developed a sedan version of the Subaru Justy which was unique to Taiwan.

== Defunct ==
- Yulon Tobe (2009–2013)
- Thunder Power (2011–2022)
