= Kuozui Motors =

Taiwanese manufacturing company

Kuozui Motors, Ltd.
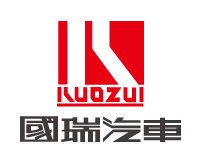
- Predecessor: Huatung Motors, Ltd.
- Founded: 1984; 42 years ago
- Headquarters: Taipei, Taiwan
- Key people: Kazuo Naganuma (Chairman); Su Chwen Shing (Vice Chairman); Koyashiki Hirofumi (President); Wen Chi Chen (Vice President)
- Owners: Toyota (65%); Hotai Motor (30%); Hino Motors (5%)
- Website: https://www.kuozui.com.tw

Kuozui Motors
- Chinese: 國瑞汽車
Transcriptions
Standard Mandarin
- Hanyu Pinyin: Guóruì Qìchē
Hakka
- Romanization: Koet-sui Hi-chhâ
Southern Min
- Hokkien POJ: Kok-sūi Khì-chhia

Kuozui Motors (Chinese: 國瑞汽車; pinyin: Guóruì Qìchē) is a Taiwanese manufacturing company that builds Toyotas under license for the domestic market. It began as a co-ownership of Hino Motors and Hotai Motor. The corporation was spun off and became independent in the 1980s. Toyota still invests heavily in the corporation's production sector, expanding Taiwanese plants.

It was founded as a joint venture, Huatung Motors, Ltd. by General Motors and the Ministry of Economic Affairs, Ministry of National Defense. GM withdrew in 1983. Hotai Motor, based in Taiwan, then stepped in, and in 1984, along with Hino Motors, established Kuozui Motors. In 2008, Toyota and Hotai Motor increased its stake in the company to form the majority ownership.

== Current models ==
=== Manufactured locally ===
==== Guanyin Plant ====
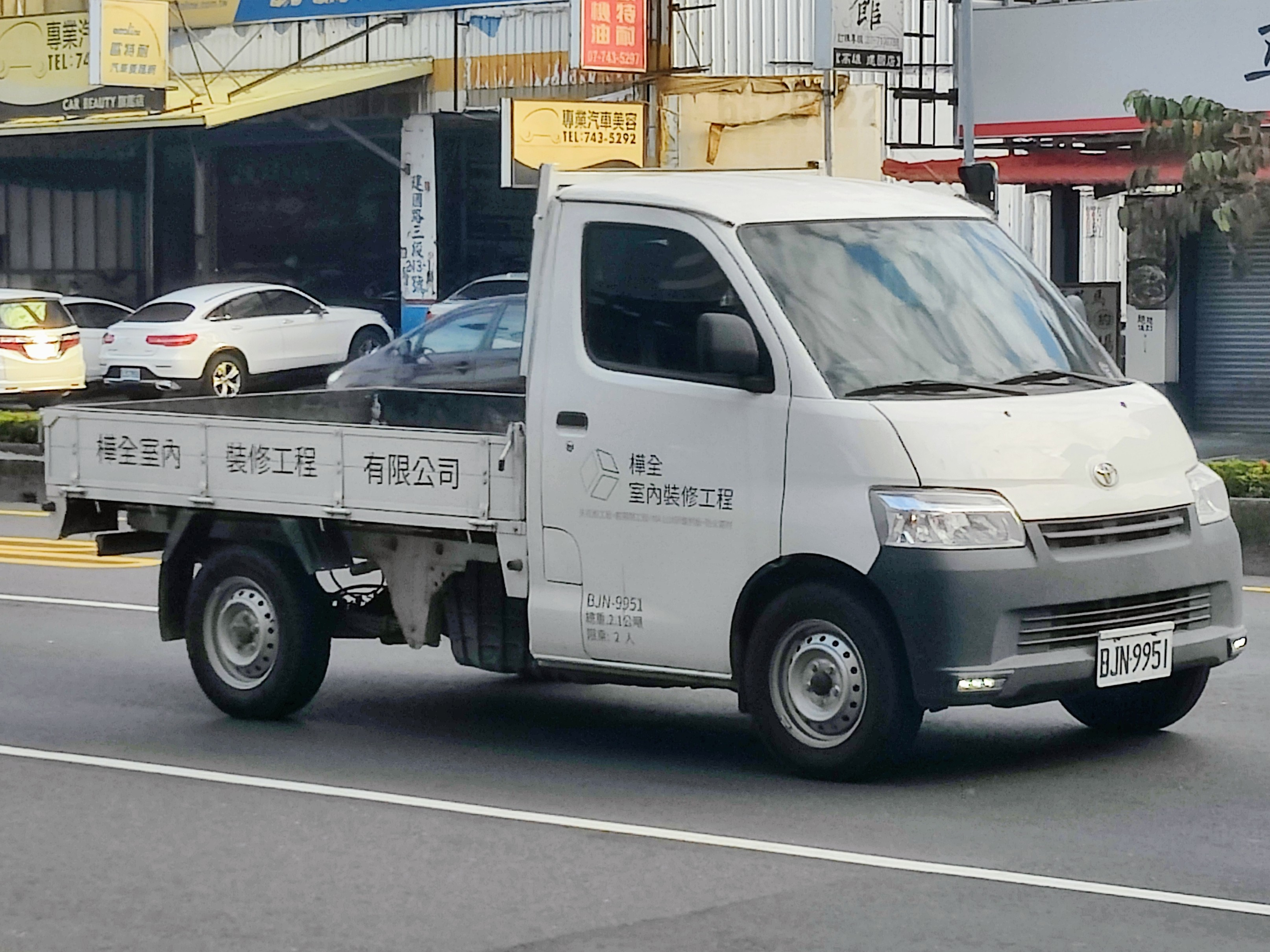
Toyota Town Ace

- Toyota TownAce
- Toyota Vios
- Toyota Noah/Voxy (export only)
- Toyota Yaris Cross
- Hino bus chassis
- Hino 300 series
- Hino 500 series
- Hino 700 series

==== Zhongli Plant ====
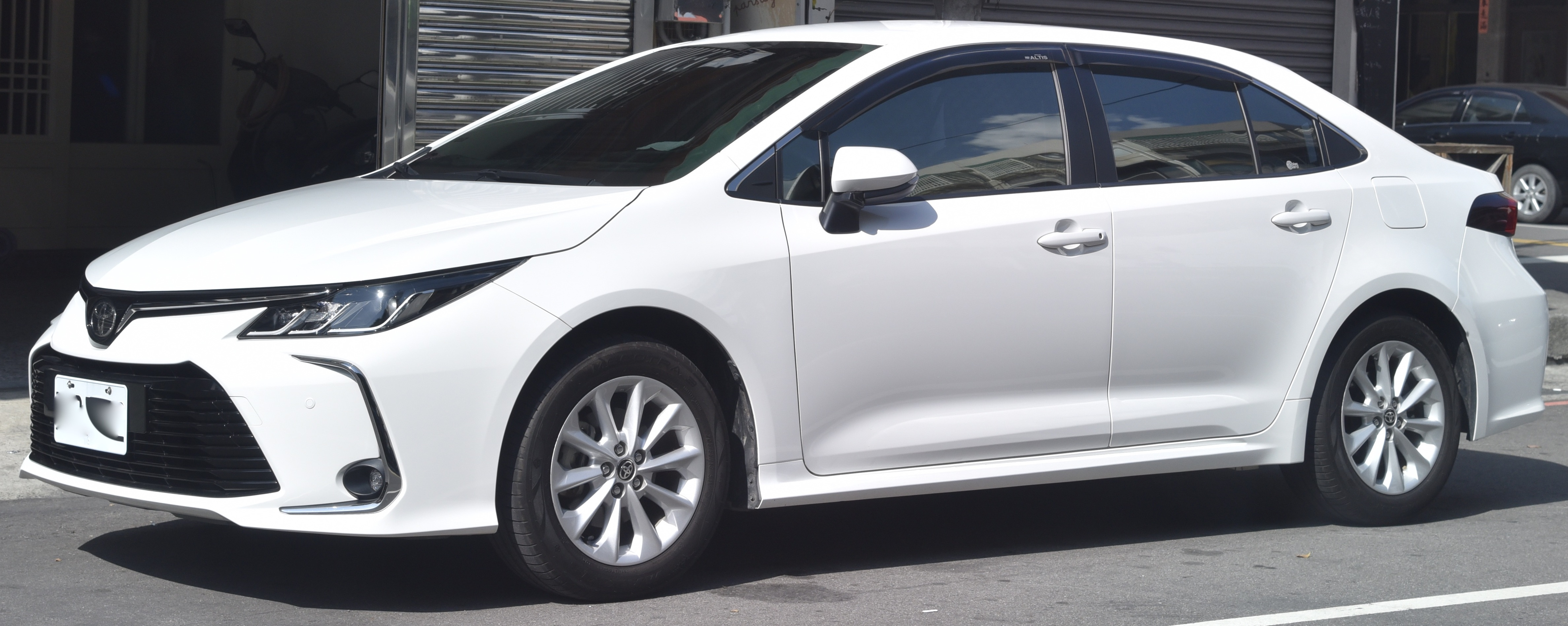
Toyota Corolla Altis

- Toyota Corolla Altis
- Toyota Corolla Cross

=== Imported ===
- Toyota Alphard
- Toyota bZ4X
- Toyota Camry
- Toyota Coaster
- Toyota Corolla Sport
- Toyota Crown Crossover
- Toyota Crown Sport
- Toyota GR Yaris
- Toyota GR 86
- Toyota Granvia
- Toyota HiAce
- Toyota Hilux
- Toyota Land Cruiser Prado
- Toyota Prius PHEV
- Toyota Prius
- Toyota RAV4
- Toyota Sienna
- Toyota Urban Cruiser (BEV)

== Discontinued models ==
=== Manufactured locally ===
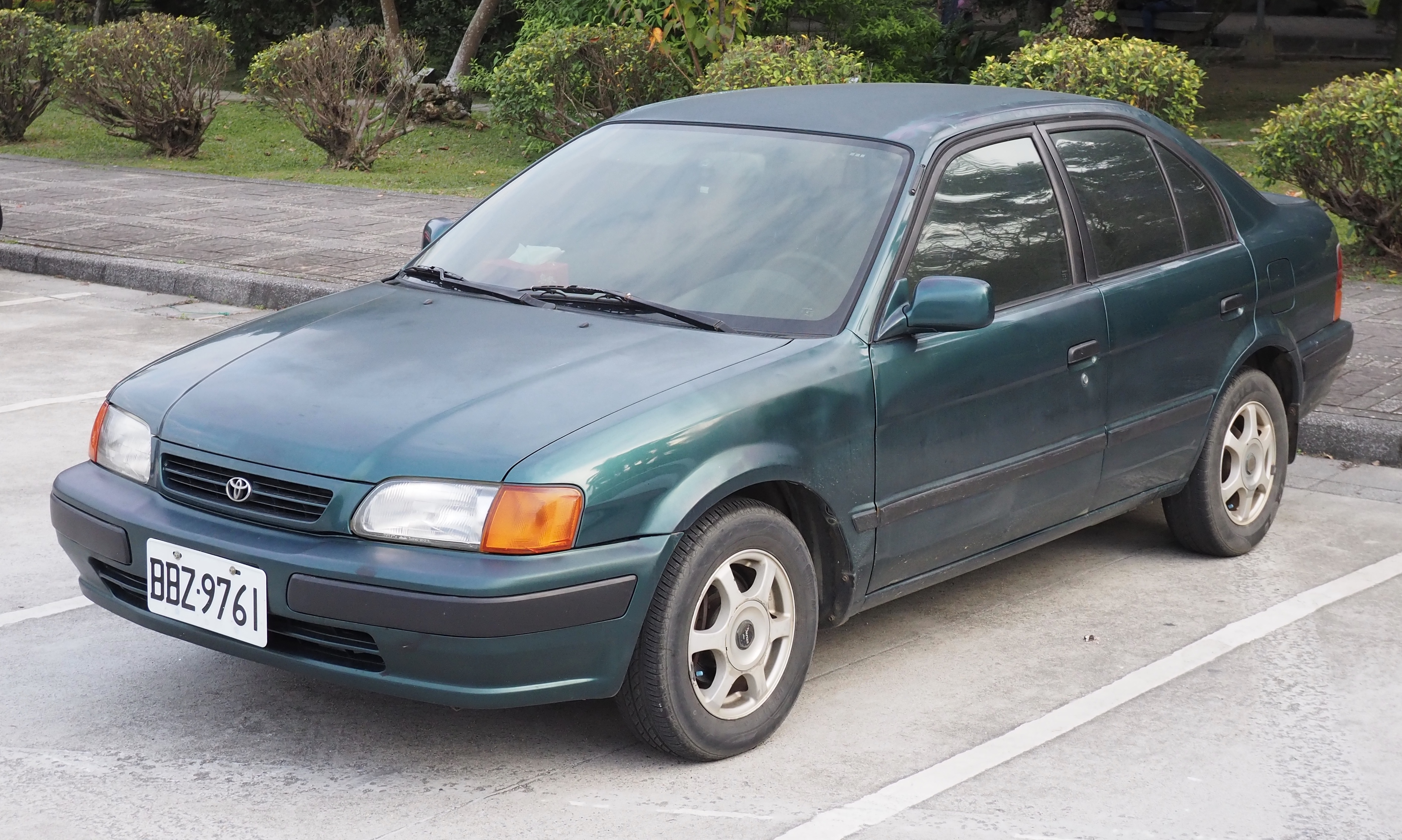
Toyota Tercel

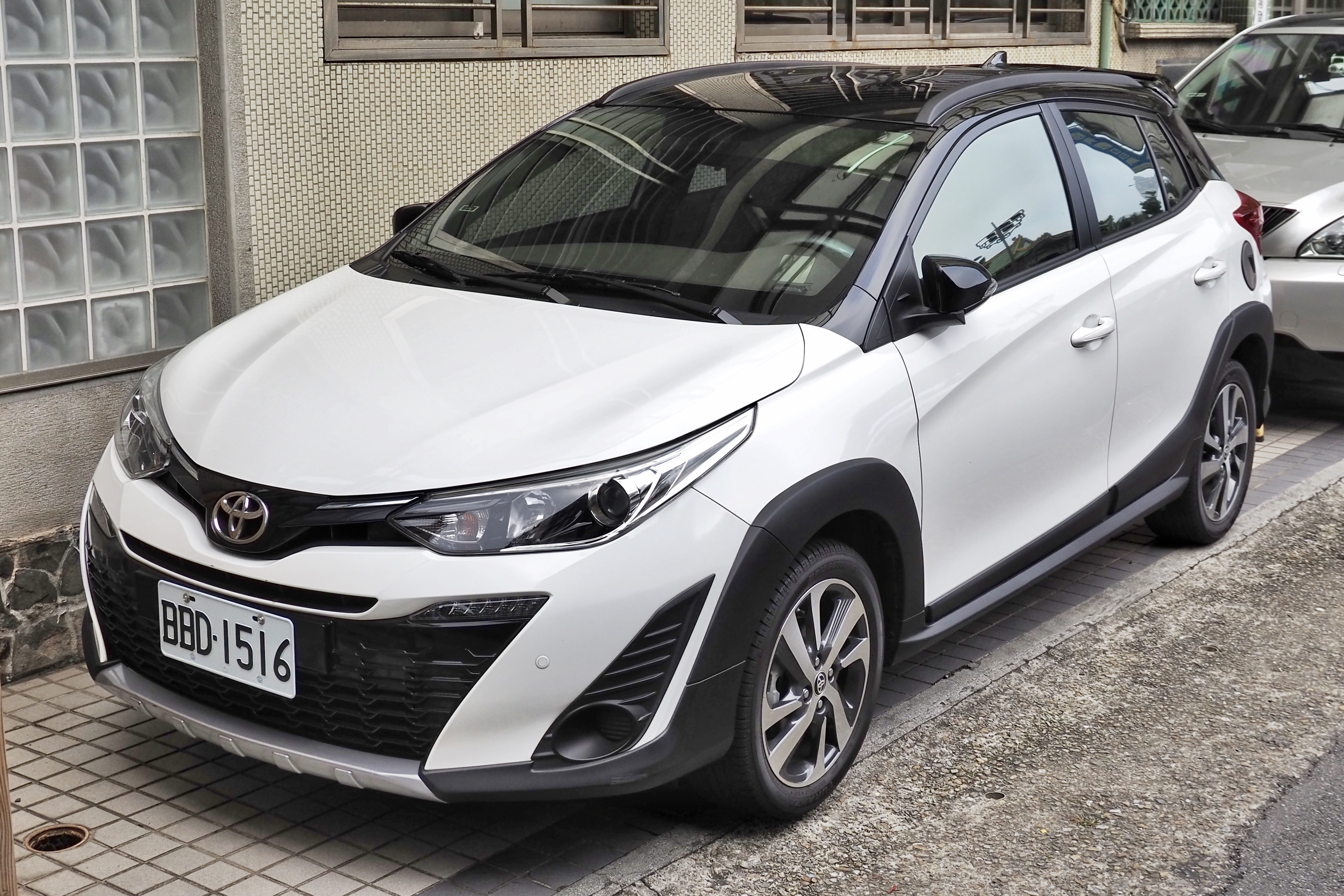
Toyota Yaris Crossover

- Toyota Corona (1992–2002)
- Toyota HiAce Solemio (1997–2007)
- Toyota Innova (2007–2015)
- Toyota Wish (2004–2016)
- Toyota Sienta (2016–2024)
- Toyota Tercel (1995–2003)
- Toyota Yaris (2006–2023)
- Toyota Yaris Crossover (2019–2023)
- Toyota Zace/Zace Surf (1988–2007)

=== Imported ===
- Toyota Auris (2018–2020)
- Toyota C-HR (2017–2024)
- Toyota GR Supra (2019–2026)
- Toyota Previa (2001–2019)
- Toyota Prius α (2012–2021)
- Toyota Prius C (2013–2020)
- Toyota Prius (2006–2021)

== See also ==
- Transportation in Taiwan
- List of Taiwanese automakers
- List of companies of Taiwan
