= Wei Chuan Foods Corporation =

Taiwanese food company

Wei Chuan Foods Corporation 味全食品工業股份有限公司
- Company type: Public
- Traded as: TWSE: 1201
- Industry: Chinese food manufacturing
- Genre: Chinese food
- Founded: 1953
- Headquarters: Taipei, Taiwan
- Area served: Taiwan, USA
- Products: Condiments, frozen foods, Dairy, juice
- Services: Manufacturing, Logistics
- Total equity: 22.2 billion NT$ (2009)
- Number of employees: 4,790
- Website: www.weichuan.com.tw

Wei Chuan Foods (Chinese: 味全食品; pinyin: Wèiquán; Pe̍h-ōe-jī: Bī-chôan) is a Taiwan-based manufacturer of Chinese condiments, canned goods, drinks, and frozen goods. Its more popular, widely recognized products include canned pickles, soy sauce and oyster sauces, and frozen dumplings and wontons.

== History ==
The predecessor of Wei-Chuan Food Corporation was founded in 1953 by Huang Lieh-ho as part of Hotai Motor Group as Hotai Chemical Engineering Corporation, to produce MSG and soy sauce to enrich the everyday lives of people. In believing that the dairy industry could improve the living standard and nutrition standard of citizens and thereby promote rural economic development and compensate food inadequacy, Wei-Chuan established the dairy product department in the beginning of the 1960s out of the company's insistence on establishing a “public company”. This started the diversification of Wei-Chuan into an integrated food manufacturing company. Today, the founder Huang Lieh-ho was also called the “Father of the dairy industry” in Taiwan for this reason. With the food business diversification planning of Huang, Wei-Chuan became the largest food processing and manufacturing company in Taiwan in the 1960s and 1970s.

In 1998, Ting Hsin International Group became the largest (40%) shareholder following an ownership and management fight within the founding Huang family. Huang family and Hotai Motor divest its 33% shares after losing the biggest shareholder status. One of the joint ventures, Formosa Flexible Packaging, was moved back to Hotai Motor Group. Huang family maintained majority ownership of Wei-Chuan USA, which owns the right to Wei-Chuan brand in the US, Europe, and Australia. As part of the agreement, Wei-Chuan divest its investment from Wei-Chuan USA in 2000. Thus Wei-Chuan and Wei-Chuan USA became separate entities with different ownership groups.

In Taiwan, the company was often seen as the chief rival of Uni-President Enterprises Corporation.

=== Wei-Chuan USA ===
The Wei-Chuan USA division was founded in 1972 and operates manufacturing and distribution centers in Jersey City, Los Angeles, San Francisco, Chicago, Atlanta, Houston, and Tennessee. Its products are similar to its parent company's. Wei-Chuan USA's corporate logo includes five red balls which represent the five basic flavors.

=== Sports ===
Wei-Chuan formerly sponsored the Wei Chuan Dragons professional baseball team. The team was formally the leader in championships before its dismiss in 1999 by the company's new parent company Ting Hsin International. In 2019, it is announced that Wei-Chuan will re-joined the Taiwanese Baseball League by reestablished Wei-Chuan Dragons in 2020.

== See also ==
- List of companies of Taiwan
