= Ting Hsin International Group =

Taiwanese-owned corporate group

- Native name: 頂新國際集團
- Industry: Food
- Founded: 1958; 68 years ago, in Yongjing, Changhua, Taiwan
- Founder: Wei Hoteh
- Headquarters: Taipei, Taiwan
- Area served: Greater China region
- Key people: Wei Ing-Chou, Wei Yingjiao, Wei Ying-chun, Wei Yingxing
- Website: www.tinghsin.com/tw/default.aspx

Ting Hsin International Group
- Traditional Chinese: 頂新國際集團
- Simplified Chinese: 顶新国际集团
Transcriptions
Standard Mandarin
- Hanyu Pinyin: Dǐngxīn Guójì Jítuán
- Wade–Giles: Ting-Hsin Kuo-Chi Chi-Tuan

Ting Hsin International Group (Chinese: 頂新國際集團; pinyin: Dǐngxīn Guójì Jítuán) is a Taiwanese-owned corporate group established in 1958. It owns various food brands such as the instant noodle maker Master Kong, Wei-Chuan Food Corporation and Dicos.

== History ==
=== Taipei 101 and noodles ===
The company was founded in 1958. In July 2009, it became the largest private shareholder in Taipei Financial Center Corporation, which owns Taipei 101.

The company is owned by the Wei family of Taiwan, and in 2009, was the largest maker of instant noodles in China.

=== Leaving certain industries (2014–2020) ===
The company in 2014 was run by four of the Wei brothers.

In 2014, the company announced it would no longer produce cooking oil after a tainted oil scandal. Several former executives were indicted later that year, including former chairman Wei Ying-chung. In 2014 not only did it suspend operations at Ting Hsin Oil and Fat, but also Cheng I Food Co Ltd. The company Wei Chuan, which was Taiwan's second-largest manufacturer of food then, face share value drops after the parent company apologized for food safety lapses.

In 2014, Ting Hsin International Group said it would sell its Taipei Financial Center Corporation shares to raise cash for around $770 million. Over the next three years, the company had difficulty selling its TFCC holdings, with Blackstone Group talks not ending fruitfully, and the Taiwanese Ministry of Finance voting against a deal with a Malaysian investment company. Sometime around 2018 ITOCHU purchased 37% of Taipei Financial Center Corporation, which it spent US$670 on.

A new chairman, Jason Lee, was appointed in 2014. In August 2014, Ting Hsin acquired China Network Systems (CNS), a cable provider, from MBK Partners, Limited. To further stem losses in 2015, the company approved the sale of its Matsusei supermarket chain.

After the food safety scandal, the share of the Ting Hsin International Group subsidiary Wei Chuan, known for its milk brand, increased from holding 40 to 25 percent of the local milk market. The division said it was considering about increasing operations in China that year, in 2017. In 2017, it began building a new plant in China. After controversy concerning food dilution, on 3 January 2017, Ting Hsin announced that its board of directors had dissolved the company's affiliate manufacturer of instant noodles, Master Kong (Taiwan) Foods Co., Ltd. Master Kong was entirely dissolved, withdrawing from production in Taiwan. FamilyMart sued to end its partnership with Ting Hsin in 2019, which would end a 15-year joint venture. Ting Hsin International Group was the top seller of instant noodles in the world in 2017, with a 15% share of the market.

== Food scandals and boycott ==
Ting Hsin Oil and Fat in late 2013 was found to have purchased tainted food products from Chang Chi Foodstuff since 2007.

In November 2013, Wei Ying-chung (魏應充), former chairman of three subsidiaries of Ting Hsin International Group, was indicted on charges of fraud as part of an investigation into the 2013 Taiwan food scandal. Wei Ying-chung is the third of four Wei brothers controlling the Ting Hsin group.

On September 4, 2014, the Taipei City Department of Health held a press conference in the evening to explain that 12 processed products, including meat sauce and meat floss, produced by the Ting Hsin Group's Wei Chuan Company, were made using "Chun Tung Fragrant Lard" from the Chang Guann Company involved in the 2014 Taiwanese Adulterated Oil Scandal. Wei Chuan proactively reported, sealed, and voluntarily removed the products from shelves as a preventive measure. The Department of Health urged food industry operators who may have used or sold processed products made with Chun Tung Fragrant Lard to immediately stop manufacturing, processing, and selling, as well as to recall and report to the department for inventory and tracking.

After the revelations, the Taiwan public boycotted Ting Hsin items, with a number of local governments, restaurants, traditional markets and schools refusing to consume the conglomerate's products. On 16 October 2014, Ting Hsin announced that it will leave Taiwan's oil market and donate NT$3 billion toward food safety under the supervision of Juantai Financial Group (潤泰集團) Chairman Yin Yen-liang (尹衍樑).

In November 2014, Ting Hsin's products were tested for Agent Orange since an unnamed source told authorities that the oil Ting Hsin imported from Vietnam may contain traces of the herbicidal weapon.

In November 2015, six former managers of Ting Hsin International Group, including former executive Wei Ying-chung, were found not guilty of breaching the Act Governing Food Safety and Sanitation by selling substandard lard-based cooking oil. The verdict attracted immediate criticism from both the public and politicians. Wei began serving a two-year prison term for another fraud charge in July 2017. In 2018, the Taiwan High Court in Taichung overturned the 2015 verdict and sentenced Wei to 15 years in jail.

== See also ==
- List of companies of Taiwan
- List of conglomerates
