= Municipal hospital =

Hospital under the control of a local government

A municipal hospital is a hospital under the control of a local government, as opposed to those run commercially, by some sort of charitable organisation, or by national or state governments.

In many countries the different sorts of organisations exist together. Sometimes the different types are in some way complementary. Municipal hospitals commonly offer services free or at low cost for the poorer members of their community. Local authorities in urban areas commonly built hospitals in the nineteenth century either to deal with the threat of smallpox or as shelters for the poor and homeless. Psychiatric hospitals were often established by local government.

== Argentina ==
The Municipal Hospital of José Tiburcio Borda, the largest and most notable psychiatric hospital in the country, was founded in 1863. The Hospital Fernández was founded in 1889 as the Municipal syphilis hospital in Buenos Aires. There is a Municipal Hospital Health Network.

== Brazil ==
34% of Brazil's hospitals are public, being either Federal, State or Municipal.

== Canada ==
Saskatoon City Hospital opened in 1909, and was the second municipal hospital in Canada. The 1919 Municipal Hospitals Act in Alberta was designed to encourage the provision of hospitals in rural areas.

The city of Lethbridge Built a municipal hospital in 1955

== China ==
Beijing Municipal Healthcare Bureau runs Beijing Chao-Yang Hospital. Shenzhen municipal government constructed and provided funding for the University of Hong Kong-Shenzhen Hospital, which opened in 2012.

== Denmark ==
Aarhus Municipal Hospital was established in 1893. It merged with three other hospitals in 2004. Copenhagen Municipal Hospital was built in 1863 after the 1853 Copenhagen cholera outbreak and operated by Copenhagen Municipality until it was closed in 2009.

== Finland ==
Oulu University Hospital is one of many municipal hospitals in Finland. It is run by Northern Ostrobothnia Hospital District, which also runs two other hospitals.

== Germany ==
The municipal hospitals in Aachen became university hospitals in 1966.

== India ==
Cama Hospital was established in 1893, and is one of a large network of municipal hospitals run by Brihanmumbai Municipal Corporation. Surat Municipal Institute of Medical Education and Research in Gujarat was established in 2000. Ahmedabad Municipal Corporation and Nagpur Municipal Corporation also run hospitals.

== Japan ==
Japan has a number of municipal hospitals.

== Romania ==
Romania had municipal hospitals dating from the time of the Austro-Hungarian Empire. Arad County Clinical Hospital dates from 1775.

== Switzerland ==
Triemli Hospital is owned and run by the city of Zürich

== Taiwan ==
Taiwan has a substantial network of municipal hospitals including the Central Clinic Hospital.

== Turkey ==
During one-party period of the Republic of Turkey, then newly-founded Ministry of Health did not have the necessary budget to carry out mass hospital construction and maintenance. Therefore, the central government's involvement during that period was limited to opening "paragon hospital"s (Numune Hastaneleri) to serve as the examples for local administrations (municipalities and special provincial administrations). Nevertheless, the oversight and personnel appointments of the local hospitals remained in the Ministry. During the multi-party period of the Republic of Turkey, the Democrat Party government abolished such measures and the remaining municipal hospitals were transferred to the Ministry in 1953, with the notable exception of Eşrefpaşa Hospital. Today, it is the only remaining municipal hospital in Turkey.

Ankara Municipality Hospital had operated between 1980 and 2011. After lengthy court battles as a result of the transfer of the building to the Ministry of Health in 2011, the building was left unoccupied and demolished in 2016.

== United Kingdom ==
In the United Kingdom, the Metropolitan Poor Act 1867 (30 & 31 Vict. c. 6) established the first municipal hospitals in London under the Metropolitan Asylums Board. The Local Government Act 1929 empowered local authorities to appropriate infirmaries and fever hospitals from Poor law unions and abolished the Metropolitan Asylums Board, whose hospitals were transferred to the control of the London County Council as in the rest of the country. The intention was that hospitals could change “from an institution to which people went because they were poor to a hospital to which people went because they were sick,” but the act was permissive, rather than mandatory. Local councils were not obliged to use its powers. Poor Law Unions did not match local authorities boundaries so not all councils had a hospital in their area. It was not uncommon for a workhouse and Poor Law infirmary in one Public Assistance Institution to share a site, as in Manchester, Darlington and Hastings. By 1935 37 of the 79 county boroughs in England had made some expenditure on general hospitals. There was an increase from 15,765 hospital beds in the public sector in 1931, to 30,264 in 1938 - 66.8% of all hospital beds.

The municipal hospitals were taken over by the National Health Service in July 1948.

== United States ==
The New York City Department of Hospitals built Bellevue Hospital as an infirmary for smallpox and other contagious diseases on the top floor of a public workhouse in 1776. It now operates 11 hospitals across the city.

The District of Columbia General Hospital was established in 1806 but closed in 2001.

Lake Taylor Transitional Care Hospital was established by Norfolk City Council, in Virginia, in 1890. It is still managed by a Board of Commissioners appointed by the Norfolk City Council.

Fairfield State Hospital in Connecticut was owned and operated by the State of Connecticut Department of Mental Health from 1931 until 1995.

Jefferson Davis Hospital operated from 1924 to 1938 and was the first centralized municipal hospital to treat indigent patients in Houston, Texas.

Johns Hopkins Bayview Medical Center was run by the City of Baltimore until 1984.

== Vietnam ==
Municipal hospitals were founded in Vietnam during the French colonial rule. Chợ Rẫy Hospital, the largest general hospital in Ho Chi Minh City, was founded as the Hôpital Municipal de Cholon in 1900.
