= Stimson =

Stimson is a surname. Notable people with the surname include:

- Barbara Stimson (1898–1986), American surgeon
- Charles Stimson (born 1963), American Pentagon official
- Frederic Jesup Stimson (1855–1943), American diplomat
- Gerry Stimson, British public health social scientist
- Henry L. Stimson (1867–1950), American statesman
  - Mount Stimson, peak in Montana, named for Henry Stimson
- Hugh M. Stimson (1931–2011), American sinologist
- James Stimson (born 1943), American political scientist
- Julia Catherine Stimson (1881–1948), American nurse
- Mark Stimson (born 1967), English former footballer
- Miriam Michael Stimson (1913–2002), American nun and chemist
- Rufus W. Stimson (1868–1947), American agricultural educator and college president

Stimson can also refer to:

- Stimson Lumber Company
