= Jen-Ai Hospital =

Hospital in Dali, Taichung, Taiwan

Jen-Ai Hospital 仁愛醫院

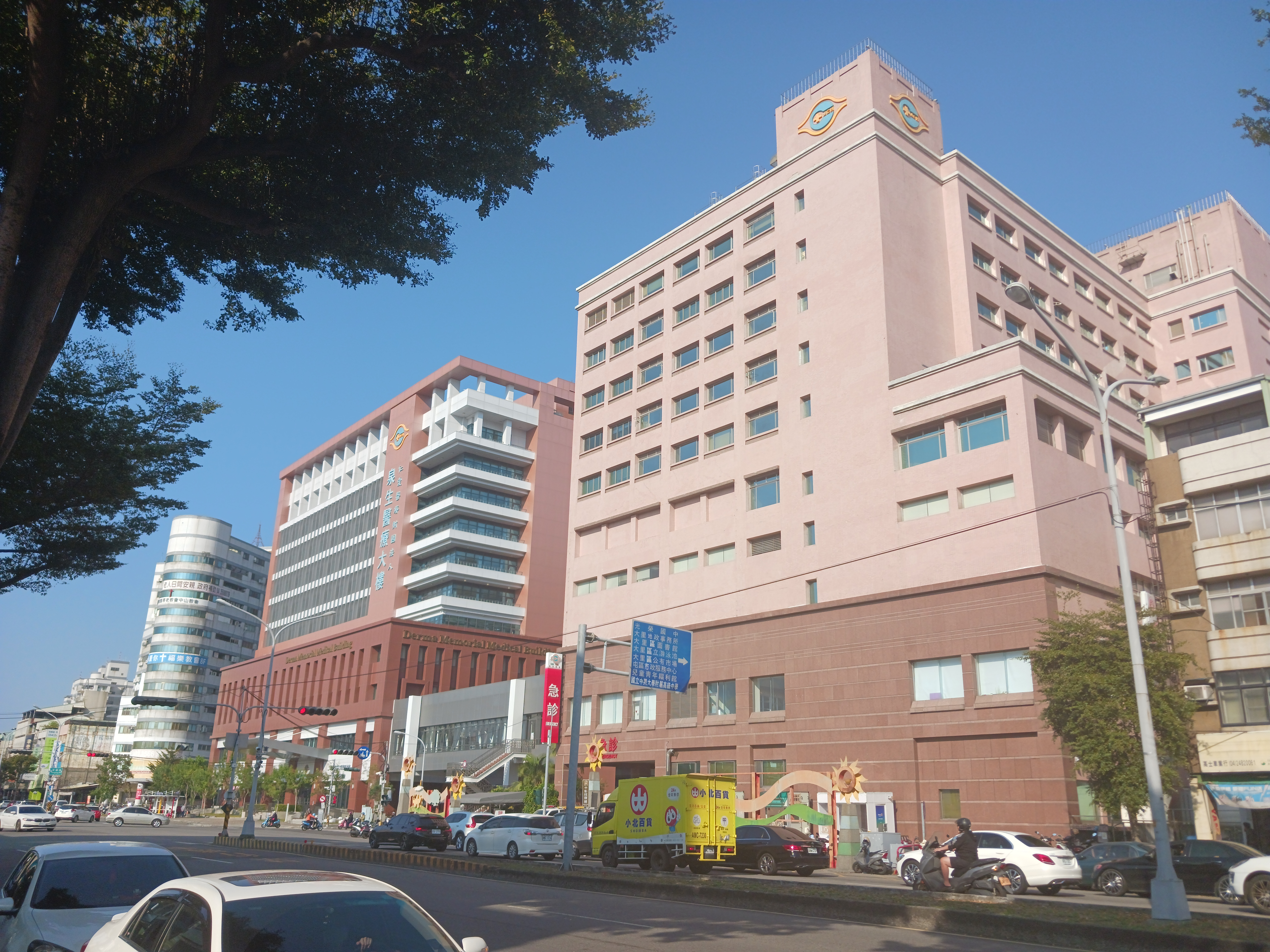

Geography
- Location: Dali, Taichung, Taiwan
- Coordinates: 24.143457°N 120.677915°E

Organisation
- Care system: National Health Insurance
- Type: Community, Regional Teaching Hospital

Services
- Emergency department: Yes
- Beds: Jen-Ai Hospital – Dali (550) + Jen-Ai Hospital – Taichung (87)

History
- Founded: 1945

Links
- Website: site.jah.org.tw/english/english.asp

Jen-Ai Hospital (Chinese: 仁愛醫療財團法人仁愛醫院; pinyin: Rén'ài Yīliáo Cáituán Fǎrén Rén'ài Yīyuàn), is a community hospital founded by Dr. Chuan-Sheng Liao, in Dali District, Taichung, Taiwan. It has two branches in Taichung city: Jen-Ai Hospital – Dali branch (Chinese: 大里仁愛醫院) is the region's largest teaching hospital, while the Jen-Ai Hospital – Taichung branch (Chinese: 台中仁愛醫院) is known for its long history in the city. Jen-Ai Hospital – Dali is a tertiary referral hospital and is known for being the first hospital in Taiwan to launch an International Patient Center and Baby Web Nursery Website.

== History ==
Jen-Ai Clinic was first founded in Shenyang, China in 1945 by Dr. Chuan-Sheng Liao (1916–2015). During the Chinese Civil War, Dr. Liao had to abandon his clinic and move to Taiwan, where he started the clinic again in 1947. The clinic expanded through the years and became known as Jen-Ai Hospital in 1966.

To accommodate the demand for medical services from a growing population, Jen-Ai Hospital – Dali opened in June 1995 and the original hospital became known as Jen-Ai Hospital – Taichung. Over the course of 70 years taking care of the medical needs of the people in Taichung, Jen-Ai Hospital continued to receive many honors and recognition, especially for their efforts in promoting an English-friendly environment and Baby Friendly Hospital initiatives.

The hospital has now grown to have 40 medical specialties and has more than 1,200 employees. Along with helping millions of people in Taichung with their medical issues, Jen-Ai Hospital has received numerous local and international awards, as well as garnering much media coverage for its humanitarian efforts for the people of Taichung.

== Status ==
Jen-Ai Hospital – Dali has 550 beds and is a tertiary care hospital. The Taichung branch has 87 beds and is a secondary care facility. New Medical Building (state-of-the-art building), across from the street from Jen-Ai Hospital - Dali, officially opened its doors in December 2019.

Jen-Ai Hospital – Dali provides medical services in more than 40 departments including Bariatric Surgery, Cardiac Surgery, Neurosurgery, Oncology, Plastic Surgery, etc.

Some of the departments that were moved into the New Medical Building include: ENT Clinic, Eye Clinic, Pediatrics Clinic, Dermatology Clinic, Plastic Surgery Clinic, Chinese Medicine Clinic, Rehabilitation Center, Pain Management Center, Cosmetic Treatment Center, Combined Therapy Center for Diabetes and Metabolic Diseases, Regeneration Center, Sleep Center, Hyperbaric Oxygen Center, Postpartum Nursing Care Center, Nursing Home, Health Management Center, Shopping Arcade, Food Court, Family Mart, Burger King, etc. (However, due to COVID-19, Food Court and Family Mart have closed down temporarily, but has reopened since.).

== Centers of Excellence ==
In addition to the medical specialties that the hospital possess, Jen-Ai Hospital has created the following Centers of Excellence to help the people with even more difficult medical problems.

Jen-Ai Hospital's Centers of Excellence include Taiwan Spine Center; Taiwan Center for Metabolic & Bariatric Surgery; Oncology Treatment Center; Diabetes Center; Health Examination Center; Cosmetic Treatment Center; Cardiovascular Center; Gastroenterology Endoscopy Center; Positron Emission Tomography Center; Breast Center; Baby-Friendly Center; Hemodialysis Center; Respiratory Care Center; Pain Management Center; International Patient Center; etc.

=== Taiwan Spine Center ===
Taiwan Spine Center, which was formed in 1999, specializes in treating spine conditions such as scoliosis, kyphosis, degenerative disk disease, spinal cord injury and conducts radical surgical procedures for these conditions.

Taiwan Spine Center also offers non-surgical treatments, pain management advice, and tests for spine health. Many new correctional surgery techniques for spine diseases have been developed by its director, Dr. Kao-Wha Chang, vice-superintendent, who has helped the hospital to be certified by Medtronic and Stryker Corporation as the teaching facility for spine deformity correctional surgery in Asia.

=== Taiwan Center for Metabolic & Bariatric Surgery ===
Taiwan Center for Metabolic & Bariatric Surgery provides well-rounded weight loss programs featuring a combination of dieting, exercise routine, behavior therapy, drug cocktail treatment and surgical procedures to combat obesity. Its director, Dr. Shih-Huang Chao, the chief consultant, is a surgeon also known for inventing the gastric clipping weight loss method (a surgical procedure that can be done in 30 minutes), which has been granted patents in the United States, Japan, and Taiwan.

Created in the year 2000, with over 15 years experience and 100,000 bariatric cases, the Weight Management Center provides self-pay services that are not covered by National Health Insurance in Taiwan but remains quite popular among the ever-increasing population of overweight and obese patients around the world.

=== Oncology Treatment Center ===
Oncology Treatment Center was started in 1999 by Dr. Chih-Chung Su, the chief director in the Oncology Dept., when cancer has been part of the top 10 causes of death in Taiwan for more than 20 consecutive years. Oncology Treatment Center provides chemotherapy, radiation therapy, targeted therapy, and other forms of treatments/therapies such as Stereotactic Radiosurgery (SRS), Intensity-Modulated Radiation Therapy (IMRT), Image-Guided Radiation Therapy (IGRT), Volumetric-Modulated Arc Therapy (VMAT), Gamma Knife for various cancers including breast cancer, lymphoma, and esophagus cancer.

Aside from offering radiosurgery, Oncology Treatment Center provides educational resources on types of cancer treatment, their side effects, and ways to maintain a quality of life for terminally ill patients.

=== Pain Management Center ===
Pain Management Center was created in 1985 by Dr. Ming-I Chan Liao, the executive consultant, who is a world-renowned pain management specialist who was educated in Japan. Pain Management Center provides forms of interventional pain management techniques including CT-guided procedure, Xenon light phototherapy, Stellate Ganglion Block (SGB), etc. for treatment for patients with herpes zoster (shingles), anosmia (loss of smell), hyperhydrosis (extreme sweating), etc. In addition to providing immense pain relief for patients world-wide, Pain Management Center maintains its award-winning website (in Chinese) with educational resources on pain management treatments available, the drugs' side effects, and ways of coping with acute and chronic pain for the people in Taiwan, Hong Kong and China.

=== International Patient Center ===
International Patient Center (IPC) was first launched in 2003 by Mark K. Chan, International Medical Services Consultant, due to the increasing demand from the foreign population in Taichung city. IPC provides free interpretation services (for patient safety reasons), while services in a dozen other languages can be requested by appointment and will be provided by on-call volunteers that speak languages, ranging from English, French and Thai to Tagalog, Burmese and Hakka. Like most international medical service centers, IPC provides complimentary on-site interpretations in English and Japanese, preparing diagnosis and certification documents, translating medical documents for use after the patient returns home and simplifying financial transactions.

As of October 2020, Jen-Ai Hospital International Patient Center has helped over 137,000 international patient visits, with more than 45,000+ international patients coming from 117 nationalities, including countries such as Lebanon, El Salvador, Bhutan, Bulgaria, Liberia, Trinidad and Tobago, etc.

Since its launch of bilingual services in 2003, Jen-Ai Hospital – Dali has had the distinction of creating the first “International Patient Center” in Taiwan and having the most number of international patients with different nationalities in all of Taiwan. Over the years, IPC's many accomplishments have included receiving local and international awards, having presentations accepted at conferences and congresses around the world for their innovations such as Baby Web Nursery Website, Baby SMS, MMS, Video, E-file, Inpatient E-card Service, Japanese Medical Service, Indonesian Medical Service, Vietnamese Medical Service, etc., which have garnered much media coverage.

== See also ==
- Healthcare in Taiwan
- List of hospitals in Taiwan
