= 2013 Turkish local government reorganisation =

Municipalities (Turkish: belediyeler) are the basic units of local government in Turkey. According to the Turkish Statistical Institute the population of Turkey was 76,667,864 as of 31 December 2013. The majority of the population live in settlements with municipalities. The number of municipalities in Turkey was 2,947 in 2009. But in 2013, most of the small town (Turkish: belde) municipalities were merged to district (Turkish: ilçe) municipalities by the Act 6360 which came into effect at the 2014 local elections sharply decreased the number of municipalities to 1,394.

== New levels of government ==
=== First tier ===
==== Provinces ====
51 provinces continued as before the reform.

==== Metropolitan municipality ====
The 2013 law made all provinces with a population in excess of 750,000 (of which there were 30) into consolidated province-municipalities, known as "metropolitan municipalities" (Turkish: büyükşehir).

=== Second tier ===
==== Province center municipality ====
A province center (Turkish: il merkezi) municipality is the capital of its province. All province centers also serve as capitals (district centers) for the district in which they are located. Metropolitan municipalities do not have province centers.

==== District municipality ====
A district (Turkish: ilçe) municipality serves as the capital of its district; these exist in both the provinces and metropolitan municipalities. In metropolitan municipalities, all other towns and villages were merged into the district capital, so each district has only one municipality.

==== Town municipality ====
Districts in regular provinces still have towns (Turkish: belde) aside from the district capital.

== Number of municipalities ==
As of 2022, the number of municipalities in Turkey is 1,391.

Type	Number	Notes	Example
Metropolitan municipality	30	in metropolitan municipality	Istanbul
Province capital	51	in other provinces	Sivas
District municipality	519	in metropolitan municipality	Tarsus
District municipality	403	in other provinces	Gelibolu
Town Municipality	388	in other provinces	Yazıkonak

== See also ==
- Local government in Turkey
