= Eşrefpaşa Hospital =

Public hospital in Izmir, Turkey

Geography
- Location: Gaziler Caddesi No: 315 Konak/İzmir
- Coordinates: 38°25′26″N 27°09′38″E

Organisation
- Care system: Public
- Type: Municipal
- Patron: Izmir Metropolitan Municipality

Services
- Emergency department: Yes

History
- Former name: Emraz-ı Zühreviye Hospital
- Constructed: 1906
- Opened: 1908

Links
- Website: esrefpasahastanesi.izmir.bel.tr

Eşrefpaşa Hospital (Turkish: Eşrefpaşa Hastanesi) is a public hospital in Konak, İzmir.

== History ==
The hospital's construction started in 1906. The hospital was opened in 1908, initially named the Venereal Diseases Hospital (Emraz-ı Zühreviye Hastanesi). The hospital was renamed in honor of Eşref Paşa in 1913. The hospital was closed down in 1921, during the occupation of Smyrna, and reopened a year later. The hospital was transferred to İzmir Municipality on 1 February 1950 by the special provincial administration (İl Özel İdaresi) of Izmir.

The dermatology and urology clinics of Ege University Medical School were located inside the hospital between 1956 and 1972. The hospital was affiliated with Ege University Izmir Medical School (predecessor of current Dokuz Eylül University Medical School) between 1979 and 1982.

It is the only remaining municipal hospital in Turkey. The hospital was renovated in 1990, and again between 2005 and 2006. According to the Ministry of Health's quality evaluation in 2019, the hospital was assigned 97 points out of 100.
