= Health in Taiwan =

A new measure of expected human capital calculated for 195 countries from 1990 to 2016 and defined for each birth cohort as the expected years lived from age 20 to 64 years and adjusted for educational attainment, learning or education quality, and functional health status was published by the Lancet in September 2018. Taiwan had the fifth highest level of expected human capital with 26 health, education, and learning-adjusted expected years lived between age 20 and 64 years.

== See also ==
- Healthcare in Taiwan
- HIV/AIDS in Taiwan
