= Central Clinic and Hospital =

Hospital in Da'an, Taipei, Taiwan

Central Clinic and Hospital 財團法人中心診所醫院

Geography
- Location: Da'an, Taipei, Taiwan
- Coordinates: 25°2′30.5″N 121°32′50.6″E

Organisation
- Type: Hospital

History
- Founded: 1 March 1973

Links
- Website: www.clinic.org.tw

The Central Clinic and Hospital (Chinese: 財團法人中心診所醫院; pinyin: Cáituán Fǎrén Zhōngxīn Zhěnsuǒ Yīyuàn) is a municipal hospital in Da'an District, Taipei, Taiwan. Its address is 77 Zhongxiao East Road, Section 4.

== History ==
The hospital was established on 1 March 1973.

== Transportation ==
The hospital is within walking distance east from the Zhongxiao Fuxing station of the Taipei Metro.

== See also ==
- Healthcare in Taiwan
- List of hospitals in Taiwan
