= List of hospitals in Taiwan =

This is a list of hospitals in Taiwan, help improvement with it by adding in new information.

== Medical Center ==
=== Changhua County ===
- Changhua Christian Hospital (彰化基督教醫院)

=== Kaohsiung City ===
- Kaohsiung Medical University Chung-Ho Memorial Hospital
- Kaohsiung Veterans General Hospital
- Kaohsiung Chang Gung Memorial Hospital (高雄長庚紀念醫院)

=== New Taipei City ===
- Taipei Chang Gung Memorial Hospital (台北長庚紀念醫院)
- Far Eastern Memorial Hospital (亞東紀念醫院)
- Fu Jen Catholic University Hospital (輔仁大學附設醫院)

=== Taichung City ===
- China Medical University Hospital (中國醫藥大學附設醫院)
- Chun Shan Medical University Hospital (中山醫學大學附設醫院)
- Taichung Veterans General Hospital (台中榮民總醫院)

=== Tainan City ===
- National Cheng Kung University Hospital
- Chi Mei Medical Center 奇美醫院

=== Taipei City ===
- Ministry of Health and Welfare Shuang-Ho Hospital
- Mackay Memorial Hospital
- National Taiwan University Hospital
- Shin Kong Wu Ho-Su Memorial Hospital (新光財團法人新光吳火獅紀念醫院)
- Taipei Veterans General Hospital
- Tri-Service General Hospital
- Taipei Municipal Wanfang Hospital (台北市立萬芳醫院-委託財團法人台北醫學大學辦理)

=== Taoyuan City ===
- Linkou Chang Gung Memorial Hospital (林口長庚紀念醫院)

== Local Hospital ==
=== Changhua ===
- Show Chwan Memorial Hospital (秀傳紀念醫院)

=== Chiayi ===
- Chiayi Chang Gung Memorial Hospital, (嘉義長庚紀念醫院)
- Chiayi Christian Hospital (CYCH 嘉義基督教醫院)
- St. Martin De Porres Hospital (STM 天主教聖馬爾定醫院)

=== Hualien ===
- Mennonite Christian Hospital (臺灣基督教門諾醫院)

=== Kaohsiung ===
- Kaohsiung Municipal Hsiao-Kang Hospital (高雄小港醫院)

=== Keelung ===
- Keelung Chang Gung Memorial Hospital (基隆長庚紀念醫院)

=== Taichung ===
- Cheng Ching Hospital (澄清醫院)
- Jen-Ai Hospital - Dali (大里仁愛醫院)
- Jen-Ai Hospital - Taichung (台中仁愛醫院)
- Taichung Tzu Chi General Hospital (台中慈濟醫院)
- Ministry of Health and Welfare Taichung Hospital (衛生福利部臺中醫院)

=== Tainan ===
- Tainan Hospital
- Shinyin Hospital
- Sin Lau Hospital (The Presbyterian Church in Taiwan)

=== Taipei City ===
- Central Clinic and Hospital
- Taipei Medical University Hospital

=== New Taipei City ===
- Fu Jen Catholic University Hospital (輔仁大學附設醫院)
- Hsiao Chung-Cheng Hospital (蕭中正醫院)
- Cardinal Tien Hospital (天主教耕莘醫院 新店)
- Taipei Tzu Chi General Hospital (台北慈濟醫院)

=== Taitung ===
- Guanshan Tzu Chi General Hospital (關山慈濟醫院)

=== Taoyuan ===
- Min-Sheng General Hospital (敏盛綜合醫院)
- Taoyuan Chang Gung Memorial Hospital (桃園長庚紀念醫院)

=== Chiayi ===
- Dalin Tzu Chi General Hospital (大林慈濟醫院)

== Municipal Hospital ==
Taipei City

- Taipei City Hospital System 台北市立聯合醫院系統
  - Zhongxing Branch 中興院區
  - Renai Branch 仁愛院區
  - Heping Fuyou Branch 和平婦幼院區 (Children's Hospital)
  - Yangming Branch 陽明院區
  - Zhongxiao Branch 忠孝院區
  - Songde Branch 松德院區
  - Kunming Branch 昆明院區
  - Chinese Medicine Clinic Center 中國醫學門診中心
  - Linsen Chinese Medicine Branch 林森中國醫學院區

New Taipei City

- Taipei Hospital
- New Taipei City Hospital 新北市立聯合醫院
  - Sanchung Branch 三重院區
  - Banciao Branch 板橋院區

Tainan City

- Tainan Municipal Hospital 台南市立醫院
- Tainan Municipal An-Nan Hospital 臺南市立安南醫院

Kaohsiung City

- Kaohsiung Municipal United Hospital 高雄市立聯合醫院
- Kaohsiung Municipal Min-Sheng Hospital 高雄市立民生醫院
- Kaohsiung Municipal Kai-Syuan Psychiatric Hospital 高雄市立凱旋醫院
- Kaohsiung Municipal Chinese Medical Hospital 高雄市立中國醫學醫院
- Kaohsiung Municipal Ta-Tung Hospital 高雄市立大同醫院
- Kaohsiung Municipal Fengshan Hospital 高雄市立鳳山醫院
- Kaohsiung Municipal Gangshan Hospital 高雄市立岡山醫院
- Kaohsiung Municipal Hsiao-Kang Hospital 高雄市立小港醫院

== See also ==
- Healthcare in Taiwan
- Nursing in Taiwan
