= Nursing in Taiwan =

Nursing is a licensed profession in Taiwan, plus additional of further nurse specialist training courses. Health law and regulation in Taiwan is overseen by the Ministry of Health and Welfare.

== Nursing education ==
Taiwanese nurses are segregated into three categories based on length of training, comparable to the licensed, registered, and advanced registered categories in the American system. Speciality nurses (專科學校) study for 5–7 years, normal nurses (普通大學) for 4, and inaugural nurses (在職專班) for two.

Upon the cessation of training, nurses must pass an exam to be certified. After two years of practice, nurses may undergo further education in a speciality such as anaesthesia or burn care.

=== Nurse practitioners ===
In Taiwan there are NP courses: emergency care, midwifery care, oncological care, orthopedic care, pediatric care, anesthesia care, outpatient care.

=== Education organization ===
There are institutes that provide nursing education courses:

School	Location	Chinese
Chang Gung Memorial Hospital	Taipei	長庚紀念醫院
Fu Jen Catholic University Hospital	New Taipei	天主教輔仁大學醫學院附設醫院
Mackay Memorial Hospital	Taipei	馬偕紀念醫院
National Taiwan University Hospital	Taipei	國立台灣大學醫學院附設醫院
Taipei Veterans General Hospital	Taipei	台北榮民總醫院
Tri-Service General Hospital	Taipei	三軍總醫院
National Taipei University of Nursing and Health Science	Taipei	國立臺北護理健康大學
National Tainan Junior College of Nursing	Tainan	國立臺南護理專科學校
National Taichung University of Science and Technology	Taichung	國立臺中科技大學

==== Differences in Taiwan compared to the United States ====
Taiwan has more patients and clients per hour compare to United States; Taiwan focuses more on family care.

== History and act ==
- 1963, five years nursing professionals train course initial, junior high school graduates were available for recruition.
- 1977, extent to high school graduates.
- 1985, add male students.
- In 2003, after the outbreak of highly contagious SARS, President Chen Shui-bian visited a hospital on International Nurses Day to express admiration for 3 nurses who had died of SARS, among other medical personnel fighting on the frontline. He conveys wishes to nurses for their devotion to duty of caring and reminded hospital staffs that they should adopt strict precautionary measures to protect themselves before contacting with patients.

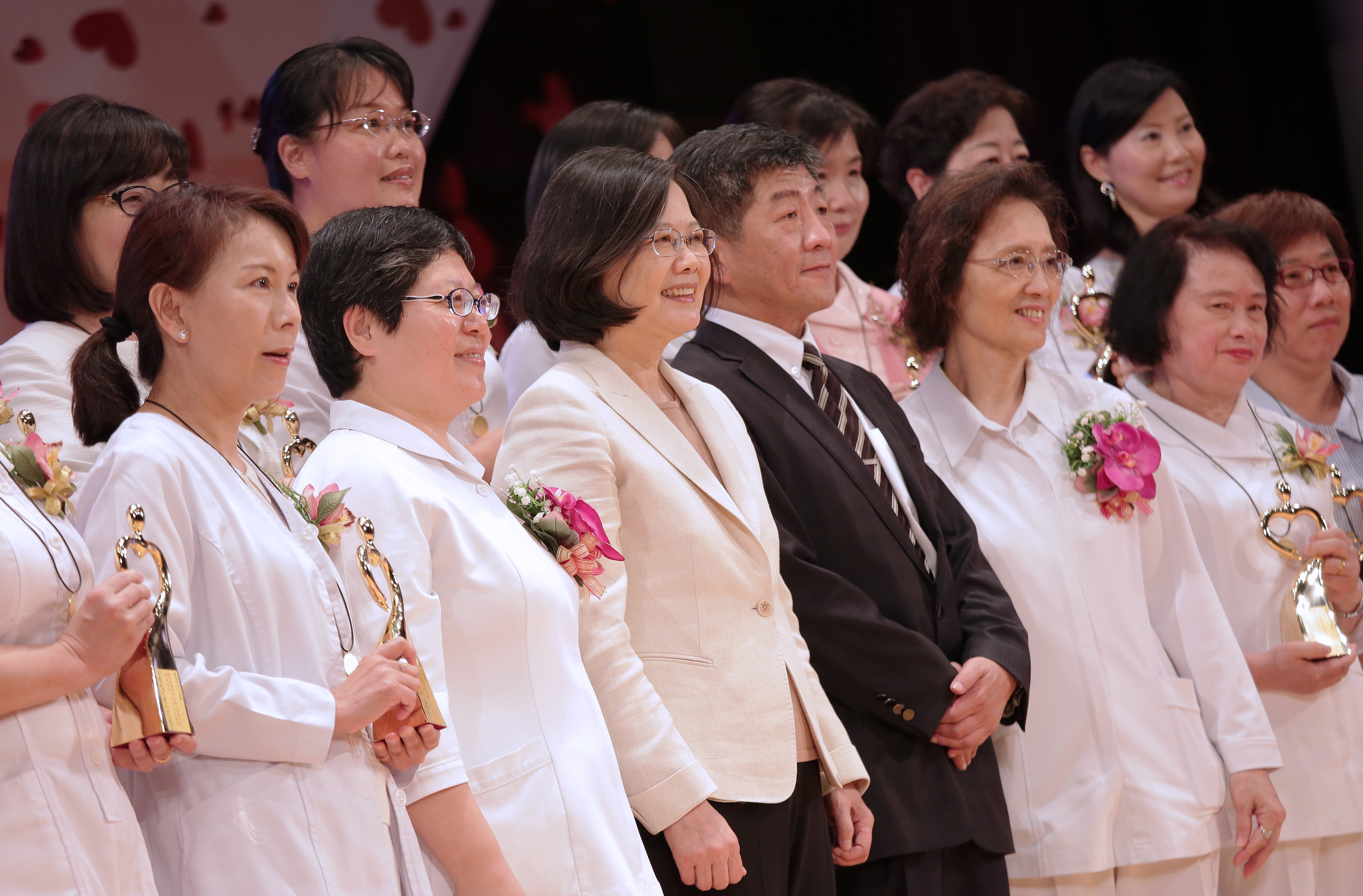
President Tsai Ing-wen, with the Minister of Health and Welfare, attends International Nurses Day celebration

- At 2017 International Nurses Day celebration, the first female President Tsai Ing-wen conducted a "passing of the torch" ceremony with leaders of the Taiwan Union of Nurses Association and the Taiwan Nurses Association. She honors nurses recognized for outstanding professionalism and service as well as over 2,200 nurses at the event who has been working for over 25 years. President Tsai expressed deepest respect and gratitude for their contributions to the health of people in Taiwan, and stressed the government has responsibility to increase benefits available to nurses and achieve more reasonable nurse-to-patient ratios and ensure friendlier workplaces. She also praises Taiwan's long tradition of providing international medical aid with the participation of nurses and emphasizes the needs to interact with other countries to share experience in nursing care. She emphasizes the nursing profession's concern for global health is a shared value for all nations.

=== Master degree program ===
- 1995, open three division including adult care, community care, nursing administration.
- 1999, open the postgraduate program for registered nurses.

=== Nursing act ===
The Taiwan nursing act, known as Nursing Personnel Act, edited in January 2015 contained 57 articles and seven chapters.

== See more ==
- Healthcare in Taiwan
- Centers for Disease Control (Taiwan)
- Ministry of Health and Welfare (Taiwan)
