= HIV/AIDS in Taiwan =

Overview of (typically) sexually transmitted disease in Taiwan

Taiwan's epidemic of HIV/AIDS began with the first case reported in December 1984. On 17 December 1990 the government promulgated the AIDS Prevention and Control Act. On 11 July 2007, the AIDS Prevention and Control Act was renamed the HIV Infection Control and Patient Rights Protection Act.

As of March 2016, there are 31,620 reported cases of Taiwanese testing positive, and 1,020 foreigners testing positive. Until January 2015, the original HIV Infection Control and Patient Rights Protection Act required foreigners who tested positive to be deported, therefore most of the reported foreigners are no longer in Taiwan. This policy was repealed in January 2015, allowing HIV/AIDS infected foreign individuals to remain in Taiwan.

HIV/AIDS patients' medical treatment costs are covered by Taiwan's National Health Insurance (NHI).

== Epidemiology ==
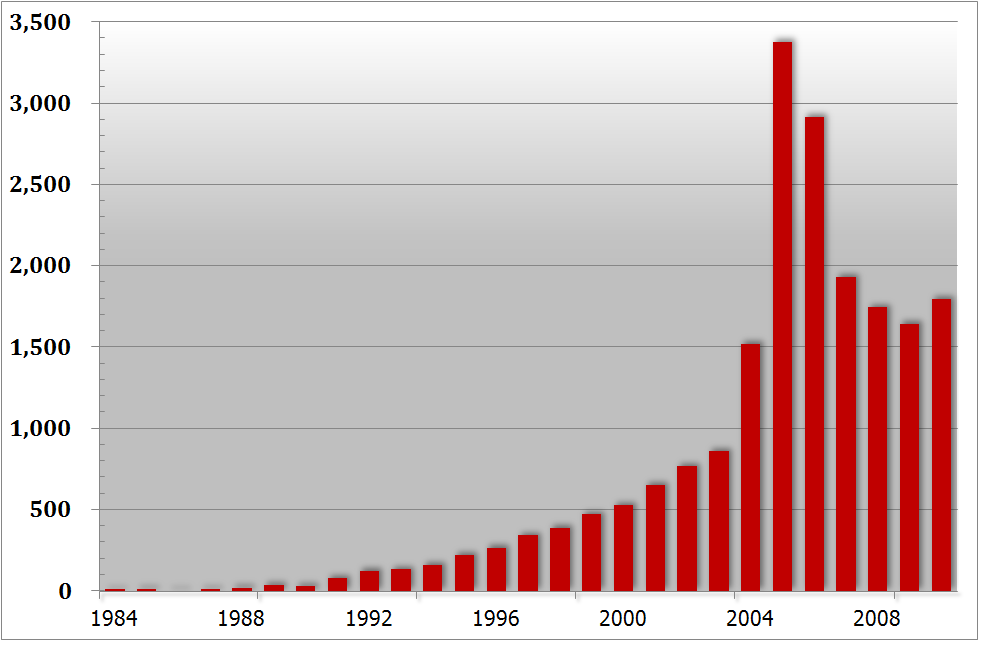
Reported HIV/AIDS cases in Taiwan from 1984 to 2010

The first reported case was reported in December 1984 on a foreign transit traveler. The first local infection was reported in February 1986.

According to the statistics of Taiwan's Centers for Disease Control, as of 6 February 2014, there were 26,646 cases of Taiwanese becoming infected with HIV.

Of all cases:

- 93.39% are male, 6.61% female
- 72.24% are 20–49 years old, 20.08% are 15–24 years old

Another 893 foreigners have tested positive, most of whom have been deported by the Taiwan government before the policy change. The CDC has not published an analysis of foreigners who tested positive.

The ratio of patients of drug users increases rapidly. Since 1984, incidence of infections through sexual contacts had accounted for 90% of all cases for most of time. But in 2005, drug using patients accounted for more than 50%. To prevent the disease from spreading to general population rapidly, the CDC announced the "Harm Reduction Pilot Projects for IDUs". The program includes expansion of the existing education and rehabilitation network, and the establishment of a harm reduction program unprecedented to the country.

== HIV-1 epidemic ==
Taiwan is entering a new and dangerous phase of its HIV-1/AIDS epidemic, which by far accounts for the majority of its total number of HIV infection cases.

Cumulative number of drug use HIV/AIDS cases in Taiwan, 1988–2006

By the end of 2006, 13,702 individuals (including 599 foreigners) had been reported as infected with HIV-1 to the Centers for Disease Control of Taiwan. In 2003, HIV-1 rates in first-time blood donors, military conscripts, and pregnant women were measured at 5.2, 57.0, and 12.0 per 100,000, respectively. Data from that year indicated HIV-1 rates of 0.09% for intravenous drug users, 0.2% for female sex workers, 1.9% for patients with sexually transmitted infections, and 6.7% for men who have sex with men in saunas or bath houses. Since then, the number of people living with HIV-1/AIDS in Taiwan has jumped sharply, from an 11% increase in 2003 to a 77% increase in 2004 and a 123% increase in 2005.

However, after the implementation of a harm-reduction program, a 10% decrease was seen in 2006. The current estimated number of HIV-1/AIDS cases in Taiwan is about 30,000, which suggests that the infection rate there could be greater than that in China: 30,000 per 23 million (1/767) compared with 650,000 per 1.3 billion (1/2000).

A risk-factor analysis of reported cases showed that the proportion of intravenous drug users infected with HIV-1 increased from 1.7% (13/772) in 2002, to 8.1% (70/862) in 2003, to 41.3% (628/1520) in 2004, to 72.4% (2461/3399) in 2005, and dropped to 68.6% (2017/2974) in 2006. The most important risk factor for Taiwanese intravenous drug users is needle-sharing, followed by the sharing of heroin diluents. A molecular epidemiological study showed that more than 95% of intravenous drug users with newly diagnosed HIV-1 in 2004 and 2005 were infected with CRF07_BC, a circulating recombinant form of subtypes B' and C. Previously, several studies suggested that CRF07_BC originated in China's Yunnan province as a mix of subtype B' from Thailand and subtype C from India. The subtype is believed to have moved to Xinjiang in China's northwest along a major heroin-trafficking route.

Of the 60,000–100,000 injecting drug users in Taiwan, 10–15% may be infected with CRF07_BC. If so, they probably represent the largest group of such intravenous drug users in northeast Asia. The circulating recombinant form might have followed a separate drug-trafficking route to Taiwan from Yunnan via southeast China, Guangxi, and Hong Kong. There have been enormous increases in the amount of heroin smuggled into Taiwan and in the number of intravenous drug users since 2002, when five intravenous drug users from southern Taiwan were diagnosed as the country's first HIV-1 seropositive cases infected with CRF07_BC. Even though the Hong Kong authorities identified three cases of CRF07_BC infection in 2001, a serious outbreak in that city's population of intravenous drug users is believed to have been blocked by a methadone maintenance program.

== Monitoring ==
Close monitoring of emerging HIV-1 subtypes related to intravenous drug use and implementing harm-reduction programs has been and continue to be vital in preventing similar outbreaks in other populations of intravenous drug users in neighboring countries. In 2005, Alex Wodak, Gerry Stimson, and other harm-reduction experts were invited to Taiwan to share their experiences with government officials, medical field-workers, and public-health professionals. After careful study of harm-reduction programs in place in Hong Kong and Australia, a pilot program was started in four of Taiwan's 23 administrative areas in September 2005. This program has since been expanded nationally, and consists of 427 service sites for syringe exchange plus centres for methadone maintenance therapy. Free methadone is provided to HIV-1-infected intravenous drug users while HIV-1 seronegative intravenous drug users have to pay about US$1600 a year. The Taiwan Centers for Disease Control plans to provide methadone maintenance to intravenous drug users in prisons, and the country's Bureau of Controlled Drugs will start producing methadone to assist in the government's commitment to providing methadone maintenance to 30,000 intravenous drug users by 2009.

All parts of Asia are reporting rising numbers of HIV-positive and AIDS patients in men who have sex with men. This is primarily because policy targets these groups of people for testing. Current Taiwanese HIV testing centers receive higher funding when they report testing homosexual men than any other gender or sexuality. This is due to the faulty belief that gay men are at higher risk for HIV contraction. Modern statistics indicate that heterosexual couples are at higher risk of contraction, in particular because they do not test as often as the homosexual population and are not targeted by country policy. What these skewed statistics show is that in Taiwan, HIV-1 infection rates in men who have sex with men in gay saunas in different cities currently range from 5.2% to 15.8%. The same population has high rates of syphilis, 8.1–13.8%, depending on the city. Taiwanese male homosexual and bisexual HIV-1/AIDS patients have also been diagnosed with significantly higher rates of syphilis than have heterosexual patients. Furthermore, the percentage of homosexual or bisexual HIV-1/AIDS patients under the age of 20 years is significantly higher than that of heterosexual patients, 3.0% versus 1.7%. One of the primary factors that leads to HIV risk is the lack of accurate information on risky behaviors that lead to HIV contraction increases the risk of contracting HIV and other sexually transmitted infections.

Taiwan's clinical spectrum of AIDS patients is similar to those reported in other developed countries, but significant differences have been noted in incidences of opportunistic infections. For example, the incidence of tuberculosis in patients with advanced illness is high in Taiwan (24.6%) and the rate of endemic fungal (Penicillium marneffei) infections is increasing. On the positive side, the effort by the Taiwanese Government since April 1997, to distribute highly-active antiretroviral therapy for free has resulted in dramatic decreases in morbidity and mortality from HIV-1 infection.

Because of their high background prevalence, HBV and HCV coinfections with HIV are particularly important in Asian countries in terms of HIV transmission via injecting drug use. In a survey of 459 intravenous drug users infected with HIV-1, one of us (Y-MAC) found that 456 (99.6%) also had anti-HCV antibodies and 77 (16.8%) were seropositive for HBsAg. The long-term impact of hepatitis coinfections on HIV and on morbidity and mortality from liver disease requires monitoring.

== Control ==
By the end of 2006, 19 confirmed cases of vertical HIV-1 transmission have been reported to the Taiwan Centers for Disease Control. In January 2005, the agency started a national program focused on prevention of mother-to-child transmission, and five cases of vertical transmission were reported in 2005. By June 2006, the screening rate had reached 97.4%, and 47 of 338,452 pregnant women (13.9 per 100 000) tested in Taiwan have been identified as having HIV-1 infections and have received antiretroviral therapy to prevent mother-to-child transmission. To increase the participation rate, there is discussion of changing the voluntary counselling and testing strategy from opt-in to opt-out.

== Health Care ==
HIV/AIDS patients' medical treatment costs are covered by Taiwan's National Health Insurance (NHI).

=== NHI Coverage ===
In 2011, Taiwan's CDC was considering switching from providing HIV/AIDS treatment for free to a subsidized model. The cost of treatment for each AIDS patient in the country is estimated at NT$30,000 (US$930) per month, which is equivalent to the average monthly salary of an office worker. In 2013, CDC Deputy Director Chuang Jen-hsiang (莊仁祥) said that the rise in the rate of HIV/AIDS cases was outstripping public funds, and that the NHI was NT$600 million (US$2 million) in debt due to treating HIV/AIDS patients. Chuang added that the Ministry of Health and Welfare was still considering a plan to reducing coverage for HIV-positive Taiwan nationals from their current full coverage, in addition to requiring foreign nationals to pay in full for their treatment.

Other STIs and illnesses were covered under National Health Insurance during this time of debate. Criticism of reducing coverage and expecting HIV/AIDS-related treatments to be paid by the individuals, included that it further promoted the faulty idea that HIV/AIDS contraction is the fault of the individual.

=== Organ Transplants ===
Currently, HIV/AIDS patients are eligible for organ transplants. Plans exist to allow HIV/AIDS positive patients to donate organs to other HIV/AIDS positive patients by the end of 2016. Until March 2016, HIV/AIDS patients were "ineligible to receive organ transplants, including transplants of the heart, lungs, liver, kidney, pancreas, cornea and small intestines."

== Responses ==
Several positive responses to the HIV/AIDS epidemic in Taiwan should be mentioned. Since 1992, 16 non-governmental organizations registered or established in Taiwan have provided shelter, care, counselling, anonymous testing, and AIDS education. One in particular, the People Living with HIV/AIDS Rights' Advocacy Association, has been addressing human rights issues related to HIV/AIDS since 1997. However, most such organizations have their headquarters and facilities in northern Taiwan, and two-thirds of the country's intravenous drug users live in central and southern parts. In addition, many social workers employed by non-governmental organizations are still unfamiliar with issues related to drug abuse and inexperienced in interacting with intravenous drug users. There is a clear and immediate need for counselling workshops for medical staff and social workers. In the long-term, there is need for more funding for AIDS research, especially vaccine development.

== Society and Culture ==
=== Stigma ===
While Article 6-1 of original 1990 AIDS Prevention and Control Act stated that "HIV-infected individuals shall not be discriminated against, nor shall they be deprived of their rights," a lack of specifying what those individuals' rights were left many loopholes open in the interpretation of the Act. In addition, the Japanese-era 1944 Communicable Disease Control Act contained articles that could be used to circumvent the protections intended by the 1990 AIDS Prevention and Control Act, particularly Article 35 and Article 40. Some institutions would cite the 1944 Act as a legal defense for discriminatory practices, including a school which turned away a student.

When communicable diseases occur or are expected to occur, local competent authorities may impose restrictions, prohibitions or other adequate measures on farming, husbandry, swimming or drinking water of certain area under their jurisdiction; when necessary, they may request various central enterprise competent authorities for assistance.

— Ministry of Health and Welfare, Article 35, Communicable Disease Control Act

When medical personnel other than physicians, in the course of their duties, detect patients, suspected patients or the remains that they consider to have been affected by communicable diseases, they shall immediately report such cases to physicians or to competent authorities of the locality in accordance with regulations of Paragraph 2 of the preceding Article. Medical institutions shall assign a full-time person who is responsible for the supervision of subordinate medical personnel to ensure the regulations of the preceding Paragraph or the preceding Article are followed.

— Ministry of Health and Welfare, Article 40, Communicable Disease Control Act

As the HIV-1 infection threat increases, there are many signs of persistent denial and resurgent discrimination in Taiwan. Several important issues need to be addressed: sentinel surveillance of female sex workers, social welfare institutions and housing for homeless people with HIV/AIDS, financial support for non-governmental organizations, training and re-education programs aimed at changing the attitudes of medical staff toward people with HIV/AIDS.

=== Economic impact ===
The original 1990 AIDS Prevention and Control Act did not explicitly protect the right to work and had no penalties for refusing employment to HIV-positive people. Work discrimination in Taiwan became common, with even some state-run enterprises and government agencies requiring mandatory HIV blood tests. Examples of discrimination include the discharging of a Taipei police officer in 2001, the lay-ing off a healthcare worker in 2002, and a Taipei Metro driver who came under pressure and gave up his job.

== Infected foreigners and human rights ==
Identification of HIV/AIDS-positive foreigners usually occurs during mandatory blood test for teachers, government agencies workers and some state-run enterprises employees. There are no penalties for enterprises refusing to hire a foreign person carrying HIV thus allowing work and employment discrimination.

=== 1990 AIDS Prevention and Control Act ===
In 1990, the government of Taiwan promulgated the AIDS Prevention and Control Act (後天免疫缺乏症候群防治條例). Under the AIDS Prevention and Control Act, foreigners who tested positive for HIV were required to be deported. The AIDS Prevention and Control Act was renamed the HIV Infection Control and Patient Rights Protection Act (人類免疫缺乏病毒傳染防治及感染者權益保障條例) on July 11, 2007, and will be referred to as such hereafter.

The "original HIV Infection Control and Patient Rights Protection Act allowed the government to order HIV tests on foreign residents in Taiwan and short-term visitors staying in the country for three months or longer. Those whose tests came back positive were required to be deported." During the process of deportation, "their visas [were] annulled and their names [were] permanently listed in official records, resulting in automatic refusal of any future application for an entry visa." Foreigners infected by their Taiwanese spouse or from medical procedures conducted in Taiwan could appeal to be taken off of the black list, but only from abroad after being deported.

The strict requirements for appeal were laid out in Article 20 of the HIV Infection Control and Patient Rights Protection Act. As summarized by the Taipei Times, "foreign nationals who were infected by spouses who are Taiwanese nationals, or who were infected while receiving medical care in Taiwan, and who have relatives within two degrees of kinship who have household registration and current residency in Taiwan may ask those relatives to prepare a written petition—only once—within six months of their deportation." Petitions appear to have been infrequently approved. Even in cases where both spouses tested positive for HIV/AIDS, petitions could fail if the couple was unable to prove that it was the Taiwanese spouse who infected the foreign spouse. In 2004, the secretary-general of the Persons With HIV/AIDS Rights Advocacy Association of Taiwan reported that the association had "filed applications on behalf of 24 couples to prevent a spouse's deportation. All 24 applications were turned down."

No other foreigners, not even those with permanent residency or victims of rape / human trafficking, were allowed to appeal.

=== Amendments ===
The AIDS Prevention and Control Act was amended six times before it was renamed the HIV Infection Control and Patient Rights Protection Act in 2007. After its renaming, the act was further amended.

In 2004, Taiwan's Department of Health proposed "a revision that would allow foreign HIV carriers to stay in Taiwan for less than 14 days, without restricting the number of times they can apply." The revision came under criticism by patient groups and health experts as being only a small change that did not address the central issues of human rights and the lack of evidence showing a link between deportation and decreasing the HIV infection rate. Eventually, the revised Article 18 of the HIV Infection Control and Patient Rights Protection Act allowed deported foreign nationals to apply, once per quarter, for a short-term visa that lasted no longer than 14 days.

=== Deportation Requirement Lifted ===
On January 20, 2015, the Legislative Yuan passed an amendment that repealed the requirement for foreign nationals diagnosed with HIV/AIDS to be subject to deportation. However, foreign residents are subject to additional barriers from treatment. In addition to being a legal resident, joining the NHI after staying in Taiwan for a minimum of six months, and having their HIV status confirmed by a hospital, foreign residents are required to pay the full costs of their HIV/AIDS treatment for two years, after which the costs will be covered by the NHI.

The CDC estimates that two years of treatment costs approximately US$20,800.

== See also ==
- Healthcare in Taiwan
- Ministry of Health and Welfare (Taiwan)
- Centers for Disease Control (Taiwan)
- Epidemiology of HIV/AIDS
- HIV/AIDS in Asia

== Sources ==
- (in Mandarin Chinese) 中央健康保險局公文
- (in Mandarin Chinese) 疾病管制局 HIV/AIDS統計月報表 (5月。PDF格式)
- (in Mandarin Chinese) 疾病管制局 毒品病患愛滋減害試辦計畫 (MS Word格式)
