= Fu Jen Catholic University Hospital =

Coordinates: 25°2′8″N 121°25′46″E

Fu Jen Catholic University Hospital 輔仁大學附設醫院
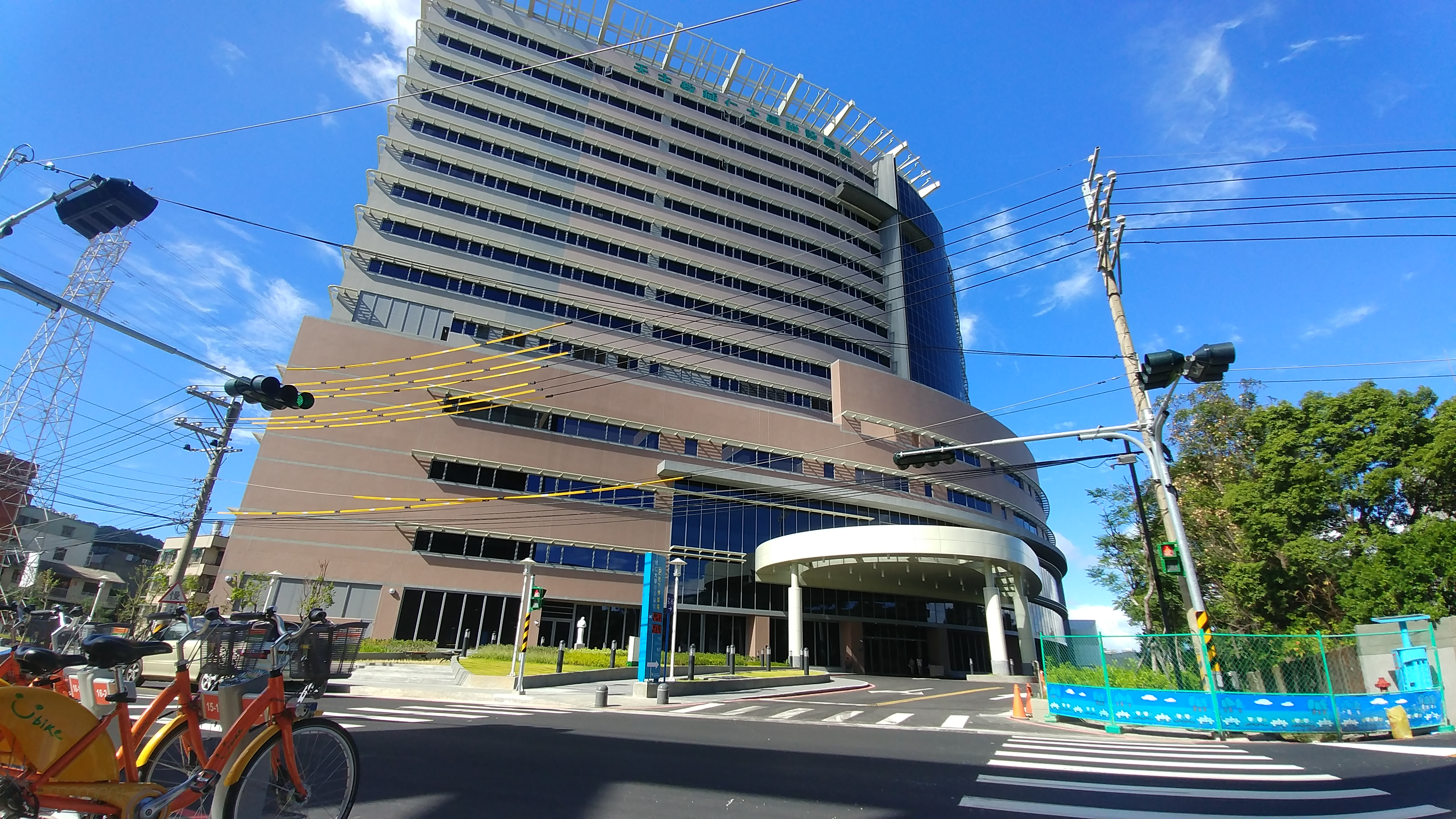

Geography
- Location: No.69, Guizi Rd., Taishan, New Taipei, Taiwan

Organisation
- Care system: Taiwan National Health Insurance
- Type: Teaching hospital
- Affiliated university: Fu Jen Catholic University

Services
- Standards: Joint Commission International
- Emergency department: Yes
- Beds: 665

History
- Founded: 2017

Links
- Website: hospital.fju.edu.tw

Fu Jen Catholic University Hospital (FJCUH; Chinese: 天主教輔仁大學附設醫院) is a hospital in Taishan District, New Taipei, Taiwan that was founded in 2017.

The hospital takes "Taiwan's Mayo Clinic" as its development target.。

== History ==
- 1990: The College of Medicine of Fu Jen Catholic University (輔大醫學院) was established.
- 2007: The University Clinic (輔大診所) was opened at Fu Jen's College of Medicine.
- 2017: The University Hospital (輔大醫院) was established.

== Transportation ==
The hospital is accessible within walking distance north from Fu Jen Catholic University's Guizi Gate.

== See also ==
- List of hospitals in Taiwan
- Fu Jen Catholic University
