= Julia Catherine Stimson =

American nurse

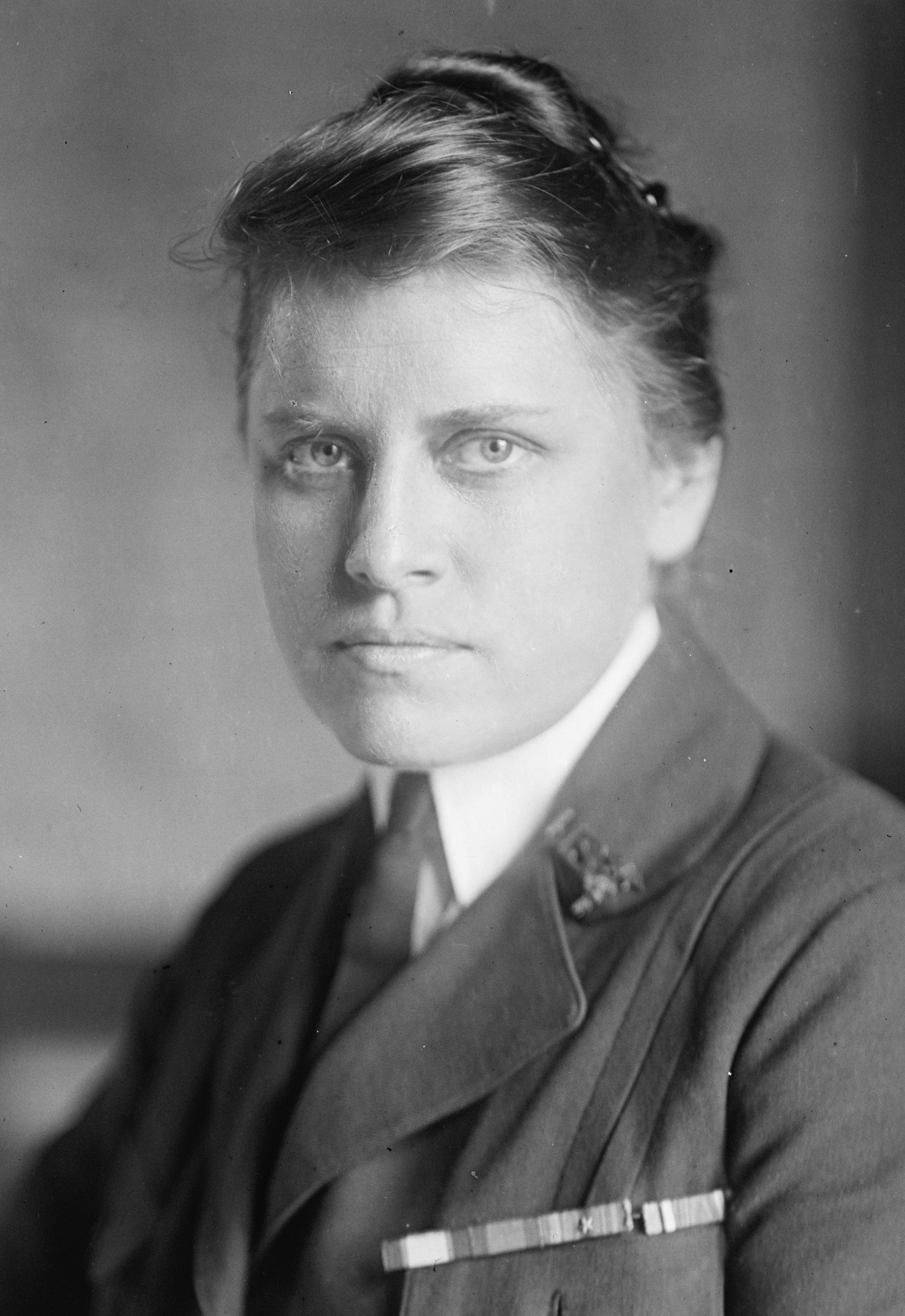
- Stimson in 1920
- Born: May 26, 1881; Worcester, Massachusetts, U.S.
- Died: September 30, 1948 (aged 67)
- Alma mater: Vassar College; Cornell School of Nursing; Washington University in St. Louis
- Military career
- Allegiance: United States of America
- Branch: United States Army
- Rank: Colonel
- Commands: Superintendent of the Army Nurse Corps
- Conflicts: World War I
- Awards: Distinguished Service Medal

Julia Catherine Stimson (May 26, 1881 – September 30, 1948) was an American nurse, credited as one of several persons who brought nursing to the status of a profession.

== Early life ==
Julia Catherine Stimson was born in Worcester, Massachusetts 26 May 1881. Her parents were the Reverend Henry A. Stimson and Alice Bartlett Stimson. She had five siblings: Dr. Barbara B. Stimson, Dr Philip M. Stimson, Elsie Stimson Smith, Lucile Stimson Harvey and Henry B. Stimson. She was also first cousin to Secretary of War and Secretary of State Henry L. Stimson and the Anthropologist and Linguist John Francis Stimson. She received her bachelor's degree from Vassar College in 1901, then received a degree from the New York Hospital Training School for Nurses in 1908. She held a number of administrative posts in New York City and Missouri, where she received her master's degree from Washington University in St. Louis in 1917. She volunteered for military service in April 1917.

== Military career ==
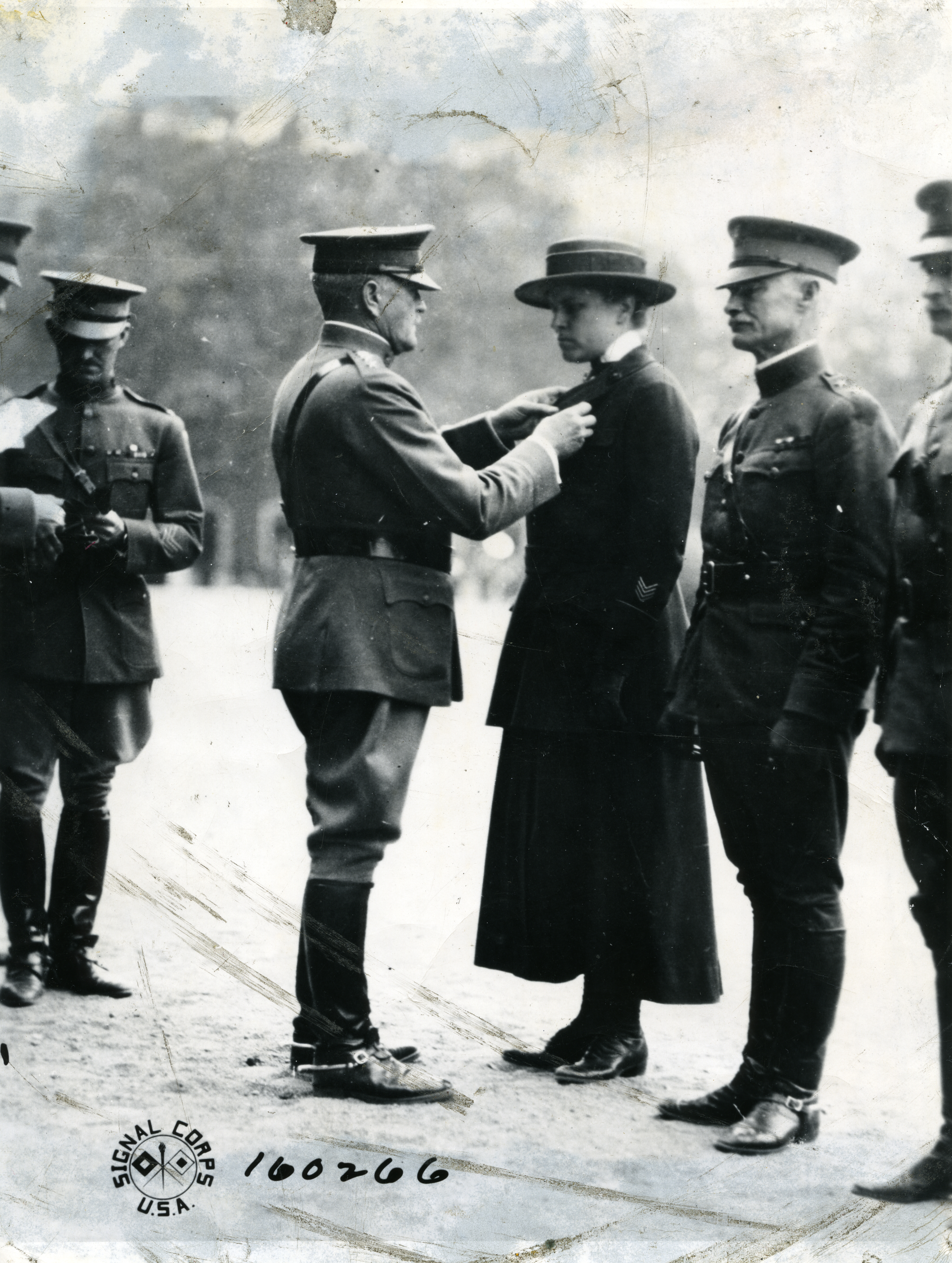
Stimson being awarded the DSM by General Pershing

As superintendent of the Army Nurse Corps during World War I, Stimson became the first woman to attain the rank of Major in the United States Army.

Thousands of women nurses enlisted in the Nurse Corps, and returned from the war as both professionals and veterans. Stimson was awarded the United States Distinguished Service Medal, presented by General John J. Pershing. She was also awarded the Royal Red Cross. Though she retired from the Army in 1937, Stimson returned after the outbreak of World War II as chief of the Nursing Council on National Defense, and recruited a new generation of women to serve as nurses. She was promoted to full colonel in 1948, shortly before her death. Stimson, who served as President of the American Nursing Association from 1938 to 1944, was inducted into that association's Hall of Fame in 1976.

Mary T. Sarnecky, author of A History of the U.S. Army Nurse Corps (Penn Press, 1993) wrote, "Stimson actively lived a feminist ideology in several singularly oppressive and paternalistic contexts--the upper-class Victorian home, the turn-of-the-century hospital setting and the military establishment of the early 20th century." Her papers are housed at the Weill Cornell Medical Center Archives.

== Awards ==
- Distinguished Service Medal
- World War I Victory Medal
- American Campaign Medal
- World War II Victory Medal
- Royal Red Cross (United Kingdom)
- Florence Nightingale Medal (1929)

=== Distinguished Service Medal citation ===
The President of the United States of America, authorized by Act of Congress, July 9, 1918, takes pleasure in presenting the Army Distinguished Service Medal to Chief Nurse Julia C. Stimson, United States Army Nurse Corps, for exceptionally meritorious and distinguished services to the Government of the United States, in a duty of great responsibility during World War I. As Chief Nurse of Base Hospital No. 21, Chief Nurse Stimson displayed marked organizing and administering ability while that unit was on active service with the British forces. Her devotion to duty was exceptional while she was Chief Nurse of the American Red Cross in France. Upon her appointment as Director of Nursing Service of the American Expeditionary Forces, she performed exacting duties with conspicuous energy and achieved brilliant results. Thousands of sick and wounded were cared for properly throughout the efficient services she provided.

== Bibliography ==
- Stimson, Julia Catherine (1918). Finding Themselves: The Letters of an American Army Chief Nurse in a British Hospital in France. New York: Macmillan Company.
