= Barbara Stimson =

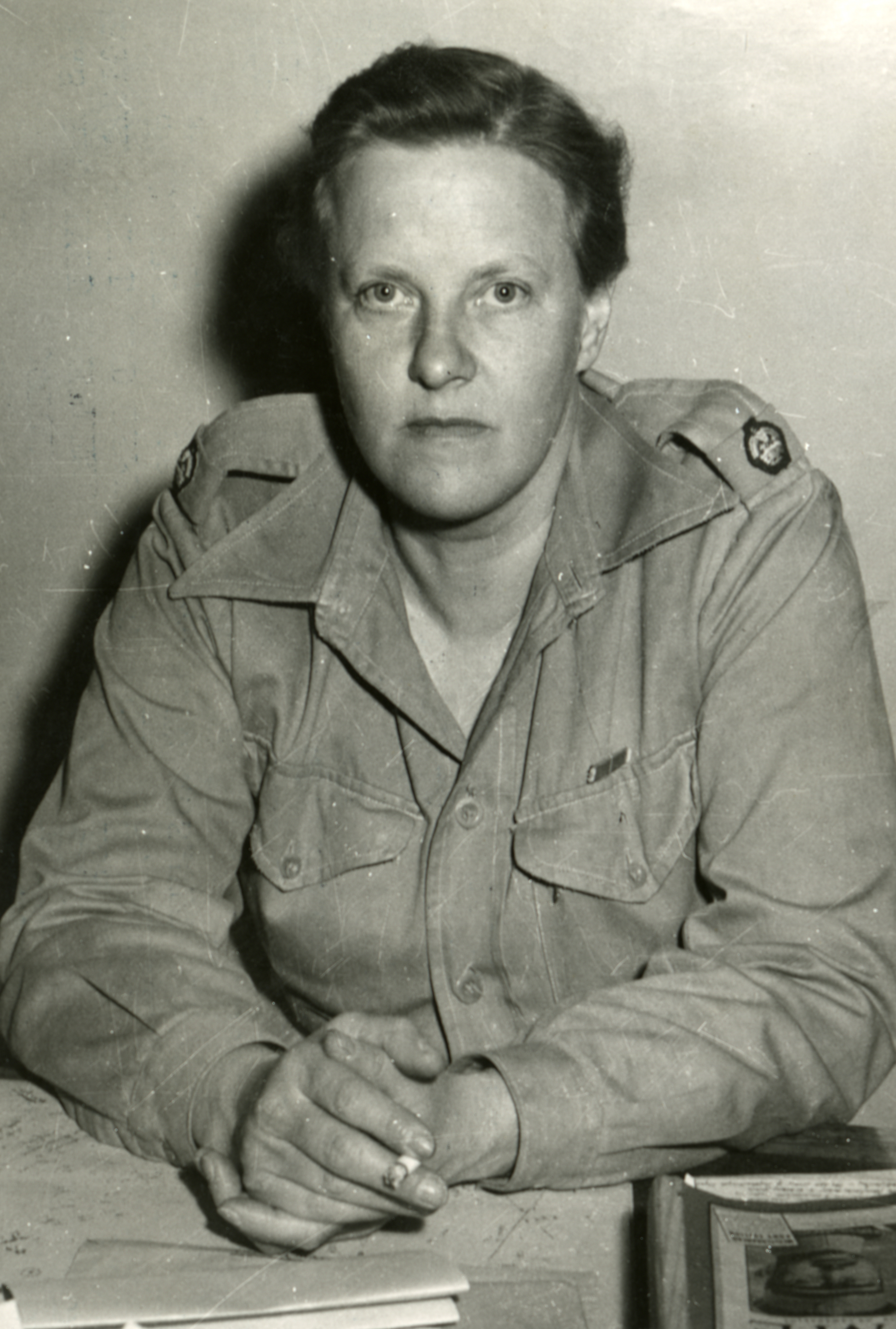
- Born: February 14th, 1898; New York, U.S.
- Died: 1989 (age 88); Rockport, Maine, U.S.
- Education: Vassar College (AB) Columbia University College of Physicians and Surgeons (MD, MedScD)
- Occupation: Orthopedic Surgeon
- Parent(s): Reverend Henry A. Stimson and Alice Wheaton Bartlett Stimson
- Relatives: Lewis A. Stimson (uncle), Henry L. Stimson (cousin), Julia C. Stimson (sister)

Barbara Bartlett Stimson (1898–1986) was the first woman to be certified by the American Board of Surgery in 1940. She was a Fellow of the American College of Surgeons (FACS) and served in the Royal Army Medical Corps during World War II. She is recognized for eliminating obstacles for women pursuing medical careers, particularly in surgery.

== Early life ==
Barbara Stimson was born in New York on February 14th, 1898, to Henry and Alice Stimson. The youngest of seven children, she was raised in a socially prominent household with a strong tradition of public service. Her uncle, Lewis A. Stimson, was a distinguished late-19th-century surgeon who performed the first public operation in the United States using Joseph Lister's antiseptic technique. Lewis's son, and Barbara's first cousin, Henry L. Stimson, was a respected American statesman who served as Secretary of State (1929–1933) and Secretary of War (1941–1945) under President Franklin D. Roosevelt. As Secretary of War, he played a pivotal role in establishing the Women's Army Auxiliary Corps (WAAC) in 1942, signing the legislation that created the organization and appointing Oveta Culp Hobby as its first director. Barbara's sister, Julia Stimson, also made significant contributions as the Director of Nursing Services for the American Expeditionary Forces in France during World War I.

Barbara Stimson knew from an early age that she intended to become a doctor. Her parents held forward-thinking views about their children's education and encouraged her to pursue this career. "Father was far ahead of his time," Dr. Stimson remembered, "in an educational philosophy for his four daughters. We were never told 'you mustn't do that—it's only for boys.'... And Mother, profiting by her own unpleasant experience, had sworn a little swear that any daughter of hers would do what she wanted to do." Barbara attended the Spence School, an all-girls school in Manhattan, and later followed her four sisters to Vassar College, where she majored in chemistry. While pursuing her studies, Stimson independently funded her own higher education through fellowships and tutoring work.

== Medical and military career ==
At the beginning of her medical career, Stimson attended the Columbia University College of Physicians and Surgeons as a member of its third ever class to admit women, where she graduated with honors in 1923. She went on to become the second woman to complete a two-year residency at Columbia. During her residency, she received a National Research Council Fellowship and a surgical fellowship studying experimental physiology at Western Reserve University under Dr. William Darrach's mentorship, a notable hand surgeon. In 1927, Dr. Stimson published scientific research on rabbits. Her research evaluated the fluctuation of oxygen volume in rabbits blood pigment throughout two studies: the Splenectomy Study and the Nitrobenzene Administration Study. Continuing her research in 1928, Dr. Stimson collaborated with M. Caroline Hrubetz on the Partial Hepatectomy Study. Following her study, Dr. Stimson completed her residency in 1928. She went on to join the Columbia University faculty as an assistant attending surgeon on the newly created Fracture Service at Columbia-Presbyterian Medical Center. In 1934 she was admitted as a fellow to the American College of Surgeons and was awarded a Doctor of Medical Science degree in research later that year. In January of 1939 she published her book A Manual of Fractures and Dislocations which became the standard orthopedic text at the time Stimson's first attempt to go to England was with a volunteer orthopedic group, but her application was denied since only women nurses were allowed. Later in her career, Dr. Esther Lovejoy helped Stimson by adding her name to a registry of medical women in the United States who were qualified to serve in case of a national emergency. Great Britain requested 1,000 male medical doctors to help care for civilians. Since the request came after the Selective Training and Service Act of 1940, only 100 male doctors were available. As a result, the American Red Cross recruited female doctors for the British Emergency Medical Services. Stimson left her position as third in rank on the Fracture Service at Columbia Presbyterian Medical Center for the opportunity. She went to England and was commissioned as a Major in the Royal Army Medical Corps in 1942.

In 1943, Dr. Stimson was moved to a Royal Army Medical Corps hospital in North Africa where she was named senior surgeon in the orthopedic surgical team. Later that year was ordered to return to the United States to speak with her cousin, Henry L. Stimson, Secretary of State, about the lack of commissioned female doctors in the United States Army. After their conversation, the two went to the Pentagon to advocate for this cause. Three months later, the United States Army began commissioning women in the medical department after President Roosevelt signed into law the Sparkman-Johnson Act which authorized women physicians commissions in the medical corps. Shortly after, Stimson was sent to an orthopedic center in Algeria. While there, she treated wounded soldiers from North Africa and Italy, becoming an expert in fractures and dislocations. This experience led her to publish a medical manual focused on the diagnosis, treatment, and management of these injuries, for use by both students and general practitioners.

Stimson was honorably discharged and returned to the United States in 1945, she was awarded two distinguished military medals and was named a Member of the Order of the British Empire by King George VI. Once home, she continued her work at Columbia Presbyterian Medical Center. In 1947, she served as the chairman of the Trauma Committee at Vassar Brothers Hospital, and later that year she transferred to Poughkeepsie, New York, to develop and direct the Bone and Joint Department at St. Francis Hospital where she was recognized as a notable pioneer of the internal fixation method and interdisciplinary care. In 1950, she was the recipient of the Elizabeth Blackwell Citation for "Outstanding achievement as a woman in medicine"; this award was named in honor of Elizabeth Blackwell, who was the first woman to gain admission to and graduate from medical school. In 1959, she became the first female President of the Dutchess County Medical Society and the first female member of the New York Surgical Society. In 1960, she was granted investiture as Associate Officer of the Venerable Order of St John of Jerusalem. At the time of her retirement in 1963, Stimson was named "Woman of the Year" by the Poughkeepsie Business and Professional Women's Club.

== Late life ==
Upon Stimson's retirement in 1963, she continued to work at the Knox County General Hospital and served as courtesy staff at the Penobscot Bay Medical Center. Additionally, she aided Dr. Hans Kraus in founding a sports injury prevention program, Dr. Kraus dedicated the first edition his book The Causes, Prevention and Treatment of Sports Injuries (1981) to Dr. Stimson. Throughout this time, she lived in Owls Head, Maine, with friend Dr. Ascha Bean. She died in 1986 in Rockport, Maine, where she had lived with her sister after Bean's death.In 1987, her sister Dorothy Stimson published Major Barbara's Memories of World War II based on Dr. Stimson's memoirs.

== Awards and accomplishments ==
- Graduated from Columbia University College of Physicians and Surgeons with Honors in 1923
- First woman to be certified by the American Board of Surgery in 1940
- Named a Member of the Order of the British Empire by King George VI in 1945
- Recipient of the Elizabeth Blackwell Citation in 1950
- First woman president of the Dutchess County Medical Society in 1959
- First female member of the New York Surgical Society in 1959
- Investiture as Associate Officer of the Venerable Order of St. John of Jerusalem in 1960
- Named "Woman of the Year" by the Poughkeepsie Business and Professional Women's Club in 1963

== Notable papers ==
- Stimson, B. B. (1956). A manual of fractures and dislocations (3rd ed.). Lea & Febiger.
- Stimson Barbara B.. The Low Back Problem. Psychosomatic Medicine 9(3):p 210, May 1947.
- Wiggers, C. J., & Stimson, B. (2025). Studies on the cardiodynamic actions of drugs III: The mechanism of cardiac stimulation by digitalis and g-strophanthin. The Journal of Pharmacology and Experimental Therapeutics, 30(3), 251–269. https://doi.org/10.1016/S0022-3565(25)05589-2
- Feinstein, I., Hilger, P., Szachowicz, E., & Stimson, B. (1987). Laser therapy of dysphonia plica ventricularis. Annals of Otology, Rhinology & Laryngology, 96(1), 56–57. https://doi.org/10.1177/000348948709600113
- Stimson, B. B., & Swenson, P. C. (1935). Unilateral subluxations of the cervical vertebrae without associated fracture. JAMA, 104(18), 1578–1579. https://doi.org/10.1001/jama.1935.02760180010003
- Stimson B. B. (1946). The Treatment of Compound Fractures in the Italian Campaign. Annals of surgery, 124(2), 435–442.
- Stimson, B. B. (1927). Changes in the oxygen capacity of the blood pigment of rabbits following splenectomy. Journal of Biological Chemistry, 75(1), 95–99. https://doi.org/10.1016/S0021-9258(18)84178-3
- Stimson, B. B. (1927). Changes in the oxygen capacity of the blood pigment of rabbits following the administration of nitrobenzene. Journal of Biological Chemistry, 75(3), 741–744. https://doi.org/10.1016/S0021-9258(18)84142-4
- Stimson, B. B., & Hrubetz, M. C. (1928). Changes in the oxygen capacity of the blood pigment of rabbits following partial hepatectomy. Journal of Biological Chemistry, 78(2), 413–415. https://doi.org/10.1016/S0021-9258(18)84001-7
- DeBold, C., & Stimson, B. B. (1957). Treatment of injuries involving the subtalar joint. The American Journal of Surgery, 93(4), 604–608. https://doi.org/10.1016/0002-9610(57)90516-0
- Stimson, B. B. (2004). Your hips and mine. The American Journal of Surgery, 80(6), 663–665. https://doi.org/10.1016/0002-9610(50)90589-7
- Wiggers, C. J., & Stimson, B. B. (1927). Studies on the cardiodynamic actions of drugs III: The mechanism of cardiac stimulation by digitalis and g-strophanthin. The Journal of Pharmacology and Experimental Therapeutics, 30(3), 251–269.
- Stimson, B. B. (1947). The use of internal fixation in compound fractures. The American Journal of Surgery, 74(5), 697–704. https://doi.org/10.1016/0002-9610(47)90226-2
- Stimson, B. B. (1940). Fractures. The Physical Therapy Review, 20(6), 336–338. https://doi.org/10.1093/ptj/20.6.336
