= Gerry Stimson =

British public health social scientist

Gerry Stimson is a British public health social scientist, emeritus professor at Imperial College London from 2004, and an honorary professor at the London School of Hygiene and Tropical Medicine from 2017. Stimson has over 220 scientific publications mainly on social and health aspects of illicit drug use, including HIV infection. He has sat on numerous editorial boards including AIDS, Addiction, and European Addiction Research, and with Tim Rhodes he was the co-editor-in-chief of the International Journal of Drug Policy from 2000 to 2016. He is one of the global leaders for research on and later advocacy for harm reduction.

== Contribution to the social understanding of health behaviour ==
Stimson studied social science and social psychology at the London School of Economics in the 1960s, and did his research training at the Institute of Psychiatry in London, joining the Addiction Research Unit there when it was first established in 1967. He was among a cohort of new social scientists working in what was then called 'medical sociology' and later the 'sociology of health and illness' which established the significance of the social sciences for understanding health behaviour, and in particular the importance of the perspective of the patient. His 1975 work on doctor-patient interaction, Going to see the doctor, influenced medical school courses on communicating with patients. He was a founder with Robert Dingwall of the journal Sociology of Health and Illness. He taught courses on the sociology of health and illness at Goldsmiths College London, where he was head of the Sociology Department from 1980 to 1983.

== Research on drug use and drug policy ==
Whilst at the Addiction Research Unit he conducted research on the prescribing of heroin at London drug dependency clinics, which became a long term follow-up study of people dependent on heroin, blending quantitative and qualitative research and a historical analysis of drug policy. The research provides insights into drug treatment and addiction from the personal view of people who were addicted to heroin.

== Work on HIV prevention and harm reduction ==
From the mid-1980s he became increasingly involved in the application of social science to public health issues, linked to his research on drug use and the risks of HIV infection. In 1987 whilst at Goldsmiths' College he was commissioned by the UK government to undertake the evaluation of the experimental needle and syringe exchange programme in England and Scotland. In 1990 he established the Centre for Research on Drugs and Health Behaviour at Imperial College London, and directed it until 2004. His work there developed multi-methods research on illicit drug use and alcohol. His team pioneered consumer engagement in research by including drug users on research advisory panels and as fieldworkers. His work at the Centre for Research on Drugs and Health Behaviour mapped social-behavioural aspects of injecting drug use, the epidemiology of HIV infection, and the impact of needle exchange schemes and methadone treatment for people who inject drugs. He viewed the UK response to HIV among people who inject drugs as a public health success. The introduction of drugs harm reduction led the UK to have one of the lowest rates of HIV infection among drug injectors in the world.

Stimson has been a critic of the UK Government's drug policy. In the late 1990s he coined the expression 'policy based evidence making', alluding to the ways in which politicians often selectively choose facts which support their positions, and as a counterpoint to the optimism that many social scientists had at the time that good evidence leads to good policy (a position known as 'evidence based policy making'.

In 1997 he established the Department of Social Science and Medicine at Imperial College London within the then new Division of Primary Care and Population Health Sciences.

He was a member of the UK Advisory Council on the Misuse of Drugs (ACMD) from 1984 until 1999 and a member of the Advisory Council on the Misuse of Drugs Working Group on AIDS and Drug Misuse. Soon after the HIV antibody test was introduced in 1985 high prevalence of HIV infection had been identified in some groups of heroin injectors in Scotland. The ACMD concluded that "The spread of HIV is a greater danger to individual and public health than drug misuse [...] We must therefore […] work with those who continue to misuse drugs to help them reduce the risk involved in doing so, and above all the risk of acquiring or spreading HIV." The report is described as "a key step along the road to the development of harm reduction as a distinct area of professional practice". Stimson, writing in 1990, described what was seen as a new paradigm for those working in the drugs field, that focussed on the prevention of drug harms rather than on drug use itself. Harm reduction had a significant impact on UK drug policy over the next ten years including the expansion of needle exchange programmes and methadone treatment.

== Harm reduction and human rights ==
In 2004 Stimson left academic work and became executive director of the International Harm Reduction Association (IHRA) (now Harm Reduction International) and developed a programme of work linking public health and human rights approaches to harm reduction. He helped draft the definition of harm reduction, and instigated the biennial report on the Global State of Harm Reduction. His team at IHRA identified human rights abuses of drug users, and established within the UN system that access to harm reduction resources was part of the state's obligations to promote the right to health. He worked with international organisations including the World Health Organization, the Joint United Nations Programme on HIV/AIDS (UNAIDS), and the Global Fund to Fight AIDS Tuberculosis and Malaria to persuade them to incorporate harm reduction into their policies and strategies. He was the inspiration for the biennial Global State of Harm Reduction report which maps progress towards the adoption of drugs harm reduction. With others at IHRA he produced a definition and description of harm reduction which is now available in twelve languages.

He encouraged consumer engagement in public health and drug policy by helping establish drug user advocacy groups and national and regional harm reduction associations including the United Kingdom Harm Reduction Association, Action on Hepatitis C, the Middle-East and North Africa Harm Reduction Association, YouthRise and the International Network of People who Use Drugs.

== Tobacco harm reduction ==
From 2010 Stimson applied his interest in harm reduction to the prevention of tobacco smoking-related diseases and is a proponent of the use of safer nicotine products as alternatives to smoking. He is the co-founder, with Paddy Costall, of the Global Forum on Nicotine. He is an advocate of vaping and e-cigarettes and other safer nicotine products as a tobacco harm reduction strategy. Stimson argues that although nicotine is addictive, it is "almost harmless to health", that it is the tobacco smoke that is harmful, and that e-cigarettes have "negligible risk to health". From 2012 to 2014 he was a member of the UK National Institute for Health and Care Excellence Guidelines Development Group on Tobacco Harm Reduction. He is a director of Knowledge-Action-Change which is a private sector agency working in the field of public health and harm reduction and which states that its aim is to promote health through harm reduction. In 2018 KAC published No Fire, No Smoke: The Global State of Tobacco Harm Reduction which maps the uptake of safer nicotine products and the regulatory responses to these products. A second edition published in 2020 - Burning Issues: the Global State of Tobacco Harm Reduction - provides the first estimation of the number of users of e-cigarettes globally. The Burning Issues report is highly critical of the influence of US philanthropic funding on international tobacco control policy and the network of international agencies that oppose tobacco harm reduction. The influence of Michael Bloomberg on tobacco control and on the World Health Organization is further explored in Fighting the Last War: the WHO and International Tobacco Control. The production of these reports was funded by a grant from the Foundation for a Smoke-Free World, which is solely funded by Philip Morris International. KAC runs the Tobacco Harm Reduction Scholarship Programme. These scholarships are funded by a grant from the Foundation for a Smoke-Free World. He is a director of KAC Communications which organises the Global Forum on Nicotine which is described as the only global event that welcomes all stakeholders involved with new and safer nicotine products.

Between 2016 and 2018 Stimson was involved in a case brought before the UK High Court and the European Court of Justice (ECJ) to challenge the ban on the sale of snus within the European Union (except Sweden). The case was brought by Swedish Match, and the New Nicotine Alliance (NNA) joined the case as an intervenor. Stimson was then chair of the NNA. The NNA's legal argument was that the evidence from Norway and Sweden indicated that snus protects against smoking and that smokers have a right under the Charter of Fundamental Rights of the European Union to have access to a safer alternative to smoking. The legal challenge was rejected by the ECJ in November 2018.
