= Healthcare in Taiwan =

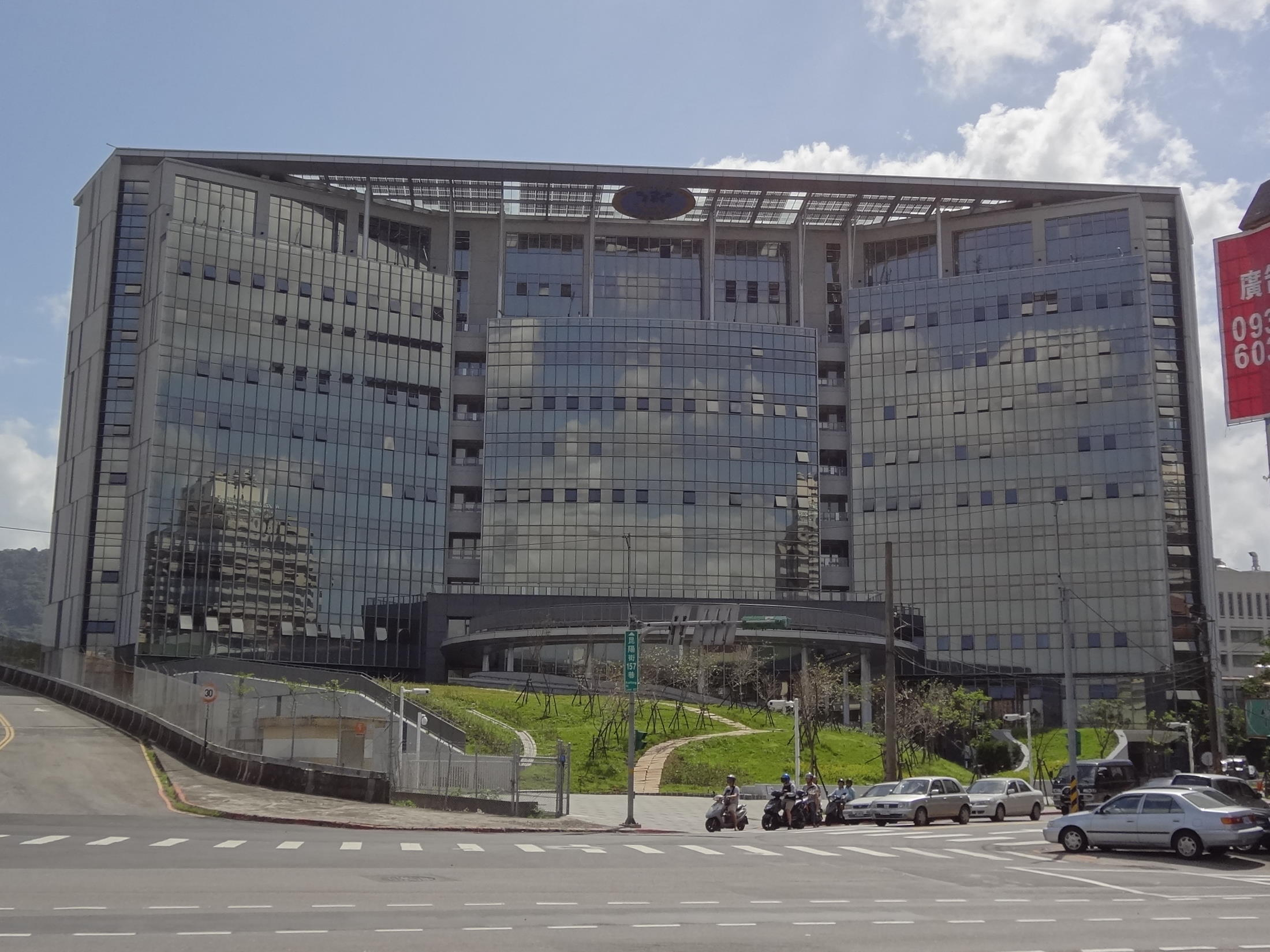
Ministry of Health and Welfare (Taiwan)

Emblem of National Health Insurance

Healthcare in Taiwan is administered by the Ministry of Health and Welfare of the Executive Yuan. As with other developed economies, Taiwanese people are well-nourished but face such health problems as chronic obesity and heart disease. In 2023, Taiwan had 2.3 physicians and 7.3 hospital beds per 1,000 population. There were 476 hospitals and 23,421 clinics in the country. Per capita health expenditures totaled US$2,522 in 2023. Health expenditures constituted 7.8% of the gross domestic product (GDP) in 2023; 63% of the expenditures were from public funds. Overall life expectancy in 2025 is 80.94 years.

Recent major health issues include the SARS crisis in 2003, though the island was later declared safe by the World Health Organization (WHO). In 2020, Taiwan was hit by the COVID-19 pandemic, experiencing four waves of widespread community transmission between January 2020 and March 2023. It successfully contained the disease in the first two years but shifted its control strategy from containment to mitigation in April 2022 when Omicron infections surged in the community.

According to the Numbeo Health Care Index in 2025, Taiwan has the best healthcare system in the world, scoring 86.5 out of 100, a slight increase from 86 the previous year. This marked the seventh consecutive year that Taiwan has ranked first in the Numbeo Health Care Index.

== National Health Insurance ==
The current healthcare system in Taiwan, known as National Health Insurance (NHI, Chinese: 全民健康保險), was instituted in 1995. NHI is a single-payer compulsory social insurance plan that centralizes the disbursement of healthcare funds. The system promises equal access to healthcare for all citizens. Population coverage reached 99.9% by the end of 2023. NHI is mainly financed through premiums, which are based on the payroll tax, and is supplemented with out-of-pocket payments and direct government funding. In the initial stage, fee-for-service predominated for public and private providers. Most health providers operate in the private sector and form a competitive market on the health delivery side. However, many healthcare providers took advantage of the system by offering unnecessary services to a larger number of patients and then billing the government. In the face of increasing loss and the need for cost containment, NHI changed the payment system from fee-for-service to a global budget, a kind of prospective payment system, in 2002. Then, in 2013, the second-generation NHI system was launched to increase the funding pool. Supplementary premiums were levied at a 4.91% rate on high bonuses, professional fees, investment interest, stock dividends, and rent to ensure greater fairness in premium contributions.

The implementation of universal healthcare created fewer health disparities for lower-income citizens in Taiwan. Additionally, life expectancy increased more in health class groups that had higher mortality rates before national health insurance was introduced. Life expectancy in Taiwan was 80.2 years as of 2023. Infant mortality rate was low, at only 4.3 deaths for 1,000 live births in 2023. Fertility rates are very high and stable.

== History ==
Modern medicine only reached Taiwan after the Japanese invasion in 1895. Disease was one of the biggest challenges faced by the Japanese in their early years on Taiwan. A Japanese Prince who was part of the invasion force died of malaria. The Japanese introduced western medicine and modern sanitation practices. The introduction of water purification plants reduced the spread of cholera and other diseases. Communicable disease was a major issue, a plague outbreak lasted from 1898 to 1918. Malaria was reduced through the draining of wetlands and the clearing of bamboo forests.

Following the retreat of the KMT to Taiwan healthcare consisted of a mix of Japanese era institutions and military/veterans institutions which the KMT brought with them along with 1.5 million troops and civilians. Healthcare continued to be almost entirely a government concern until the 1970s when a number of Taiwan’s leading industrial groups opened hospitals.

In July 2013, the Department of Health was restructured as the Ministry of Health and Welfare.

=== Healthcare reform ===
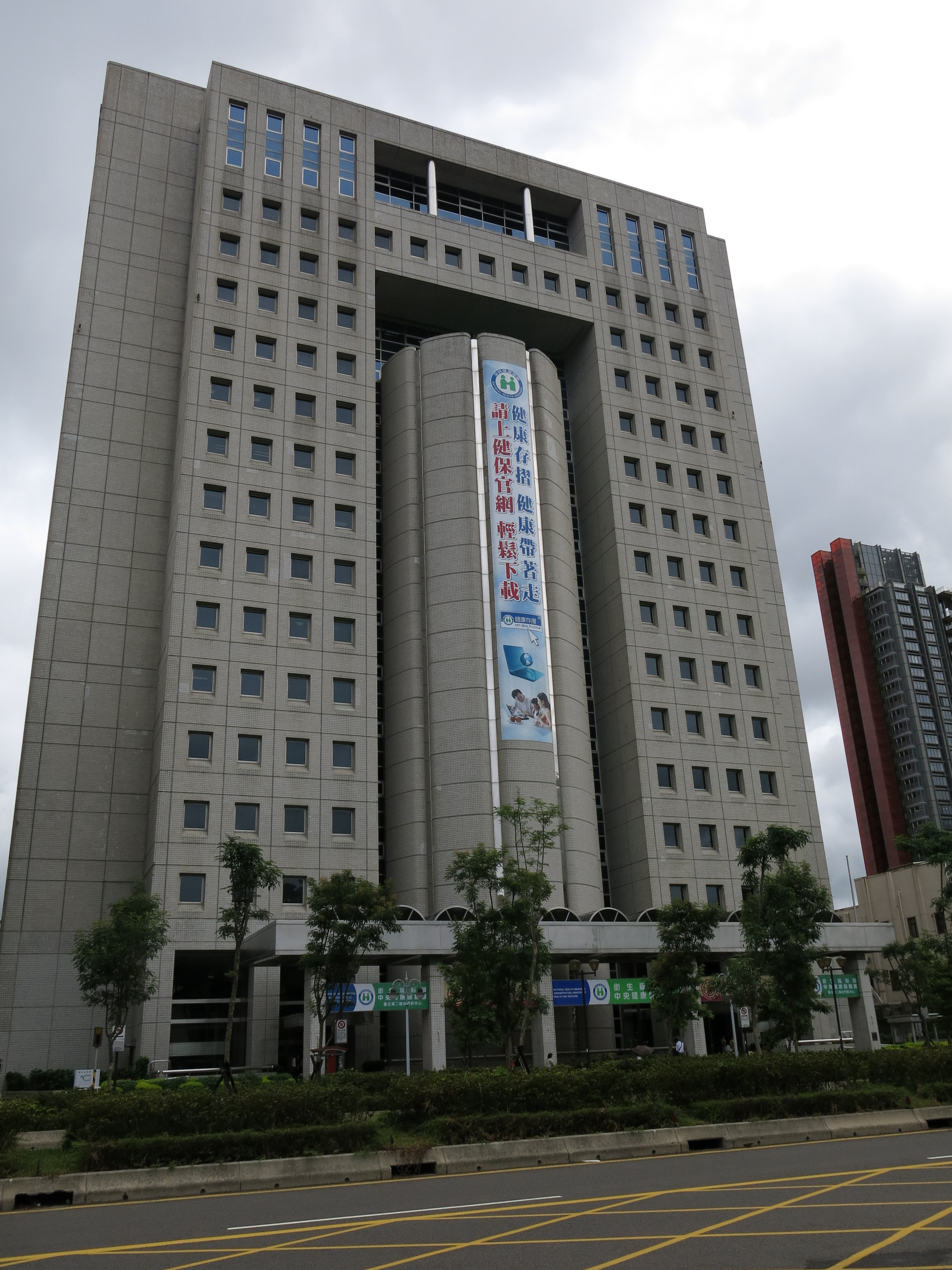
National Health Insurance Administration

Taiwan started its health reform in the 1980s after experiencing two decades of economic growth, the period often referred to as the Taiwanese Miracle.

In 1987, the government ended the martial law that mobilized the governmental departments. The government set up a planning commission and studied other countries' healthcare systems. Taiwan looked at more than ten countries and combined their best qualities to form their own unique system. Healthcare bills were fast-tracked through the Legislative Yuan between 1993 and 1994.

On 1 March 1995, Taiwan formed the National Health Insurance (NHI) model, following the passage of the National Health Insurance Act on 19 July 1994. In a 2009 interview, Michael Chen, vice president and CFO of Taiwan's National Health Insurance Bureau explained that one of the models investigated was the United States and that fundamentally, NHI "is modeled after Medicare [in the USA]. And there are many similarities — other than that our program covers all of the population, and Medicare covers only the elderly. It seems the way to go to have social insurance."

NHI delivers universal coverage offered by a government-run insurer, covering outpatient visits, inpatient care, dental care, traditional Chinese medicine, renal dialysis, and prescription drugs. The working population pays premiums split with their employers; others pay a flat rate with government help and the poor or veterans are fully subsidized. There are no financial barriers to receiving the medical care required by an individual. That way, Taiwan's citizens are less prone to bankruptcy as a result of medical bills, according to Hongjen Chang, one of the architects of the system.

Under this model, citizens have free range to choose hospitals and physicians without using a gatekeeper and do not have to worry about waiting lists. NHI offers a comprehensive benefit package that covers preventive medical services, prescription drugs, dental services, Chinese medicine, home nurse visits and many more. Working people do not have to worry about losing or changing their jobs because they will not lose their insurance. Since NHI, the previously uninsured have increased their usage of medical services. Most preventive services are free such as annual checkups and maternal and child care. Regular office visits have co-payments as low as US$5 per visit. Co-payments are fixed and unvaried by the person's income.

	≈ 1906	≈ 1998	≈ 2012	≈ 2023
Life expectancy	M: 39 years; F: 43 years	M: 72 years; F: 78 years	M: 76 years; F: 83 years	M: 76.9 years; F: 83.7 years
Infant mortality	84.1 per 1,000 live births	6.14 per 1,000 live births	5.10 per 1,000 live births	4.3 per 1,000 live births
Maternal mortality	7.6 per 1,000 live births	0.9 per 1,000 live births		

By 2023, 99.9% of the population were enrolled in the program. Every enrollee has a Health IC smart card. This credit-card-size card contains 32 kilobytes of memory that includes provider and patient profiles to identify and reduce insurance fraud, overcharges, duplication of services and tests. The physician puts the card into a reader and the patient's medical history and prescriptions come up on a computer screen. The insurer is billed the medical bill, and it is automatically paid. Taiwan's single-payer insurer monitors standards, use and quality of treatment for diagnosis by requiring the providers to submit a full report every 24 hours. This improves quality of treatment, limits physicians from over-prescribing medications, and keeps patients from abusing the system.

Patients have largely been satisfied with the system, with satisfaction rates consistently reaching 90% in recent years. However, doctors have been more dissatisfied because fee premiums are controlled as well as selection of services provided under the system. Also, doctors could be heavily penalized for a wide variety of reasons such as seeing too many patients or offering too many services even if patients and services were valid. This system has led to protests by healthcare providers. At the beginning of 2006, patients' satisfaction decreased to the mid-60% range because the program needed more money to cover its services. Since then, satisfaction has risen steadily to 90%. Enrollees are satisfied with more equal access to healthcare, have greater financial risk protection and have equity in healthcare financing.

Taiwan has the lowest administration cost in the world of 2%. Before NHI, Taiwan spent 4.7 to 4.8% of GDP on healthcare. The figure increased to 5.39% a year after NHI was introduced and, by 2023, reached 7.8%, or US$2,522 per person. Before NHI, the average annual rate of increase was around 13%. After a global budget payment system was introduced in 2002, the annual rate of growth in medical expenditure has remained steady at around 5%.

== Facilities and coverage ==
As of 2023, Taiwan had a total of 23,896 hospitals and clinics, as categorized below:

Medical facility	Number
Western medicine hospital	471
Western medicine clinic	12,200
Dental hospital	1
Dental clinic	7,026
Chinese medicine hospital	4
Chinese medicine clinic	4,194

Basic coverage areas of the insurance include:

- In-patient care
- Ambulatory care
- Laboratory tests
- Prescription and over-the-counter drugs
- Dental services
- Mental Illness
- Traditional Chinese medicine
- Home care
- Preventative services (check-ups, prenatal care, pap smears)

== Problems ==
Even with all their success in their healthcare system, Taiwan has suffered many misfortunes. From 1996 to 2008, the average annual growth rate of expenditures was 5.33%, which outstripped the growth rate of revenue at 4.43%. The revenue base is capped so it does not keep pace with the increase in national income.

There is a low doctor-to-population ratio resulting in too many patients depending on too few doctors. There is also a shortage of nurses. Patients visit the doctor more frequently causing doctors to keep visits to about 2 to 5 minutes per patient. Also, the system is based on a global budget, meaning it has no regard for faculties of risk (surgery, internal medicine, gynaecology, pediatrics, emergency), which affects the medicine, operation and diagnostic tools (X-ray vs. MRI) prescribed.

Due to a decrease in funds available, and with no systems in place to screen patients, all patients will rush to hospitals regardless of terminal patients or general cold, many smaller, but long-serving district hospitals are forced to downscale, or close down and be demolished.

=== Regional disparities ===
Although the National Health Insurance program has improved healthcare access across Taiwan, regional disparities in medical resource allocation persist between urban and underprivileged areas. Northern Taiwan has a higher population concentration compared to the rest of the country and, therefore, is home to more medical facilities and health professionals.

Health professionals per 10,000 people
	Health professional	Western medicine physician	Dentist
Nationwide	122.47	23.04	6.95
Taipei City	210.92	46.28	13.84
Taichung City	137.81	25.44	7.59
Kaohsiung City	141.02	26.97	7.27
Taitung County	107.45	15.69	3.64

== Electronic health records ==
Taiwan implemented a national electronic health record system beginning with a 3-year plan in 2009. All residents have a national health insurance card that allows health providers to access their medical information, including visits, prescriptions, and vaccinations.

== Nursing ==
The Ministry of Health and Welfare is in charge of nursing regulation in Taiwan. Nursing is a licensed profession. A nurse specialist practitioner system was introduced in 2006 to enhance the professional competence of nursing staff and improve the quality of health care. In 2023, Taiwan had 187,725 nurses and 14,383 nurse practitioners.

== Life expectancy and infant mortality data ==
Historical development of life expectancy in Taiwan

Period	Life expectancy in years	Period	Life expectancy in years
1950–1955	58.2	1985–1990	73.4
1955–1960	62.9	1990–1995	74.4
1960–1965	65.0	1995–2000	75.2
1965–1970	66.9	2000–2005	76.9
1970–1975	69.4	2005–2010	78.2
1975–1980	70.8	2010–2015	79.2
1980–1985	72.1	2015–2020	81.0

== See also ==
- Health in Taiwan
- HIV/AIDS in Taiwan
- Centers for Disease Control (Taiwan)
- Ministry of Health and Welfare (Taiwan)
- National Health Research Institutes
- Health care compared: tabular comparisons of health care in the US, Canada, and other countries not shown above.
- List of hospitals in Taiwan
- Nursing in Taiwan
