= Local government in Turkey =

Local government in Turkey refers to the governance and administration of Turkey's 81 provinces, their districts, neighborhoods, and villages. This governance is split into two: the civilian administration (Turkish: mülki idare) and the local administration (Turkish: mahalli idare). Turkey follows a more unitary system of local governance, where the directly elected officials in local government have less power compared to those appointed by the national government.

Civilian administration is always split into two tiers, the province and the district. The head of the civilian administration in any given province is the provincial governor (Turkish: vali) and the head of the civilian administration in any given district is the district governor (Turkish: kaymakam). Divisions below district do not have their own civilian administrator, and those areas fall into the jurisdiction of the district they are in.

The tiers of local administration, on the other hand, depend on if the given province has achieved "metropolitan municipality status". Provinces with this status have a much more central hierarchy, where each district municipality is directly responsible to, and overseen by, the metropolitan municipality. In provinces without this status, district municipalities enjoy relative freedom in administrating their jurisdiction, as the special provincial administrations are generally not tasked with providing services to areas already within municipal jurisdictions, but rather areas that aren't served by municipalities. In provinces without metropolitan municipalities, district/province borders do not have to be the same as the borders of the municipality for that district/province, as such, villages and other settlements away from a district/provincial center may not be in the jurisdiction of any municipality. These areas are given municipal services by the special provincial administration, though a municipality can also be established when the population exceeds 5000. This municipality is then known as a belde.

Table showing the local administration authority responsible for each local division in provinces with and without a metropolitan municipality
Local divisions	Province with a metropolitan municipality	Province without a metropolitan municipality
Province	Metropolitan municipality	Special provincial administration
Districts / Provincial center	Second-tier municipality	Municipality
Belde	division doesn't exist (absorbed into neighborhood)	Municipality
Neighborhood	Muhtarlık	Muhtarlık
Village	division doesn't exist (absorbed into neighborhood)	Muhtarlık

== Civilian administration ==
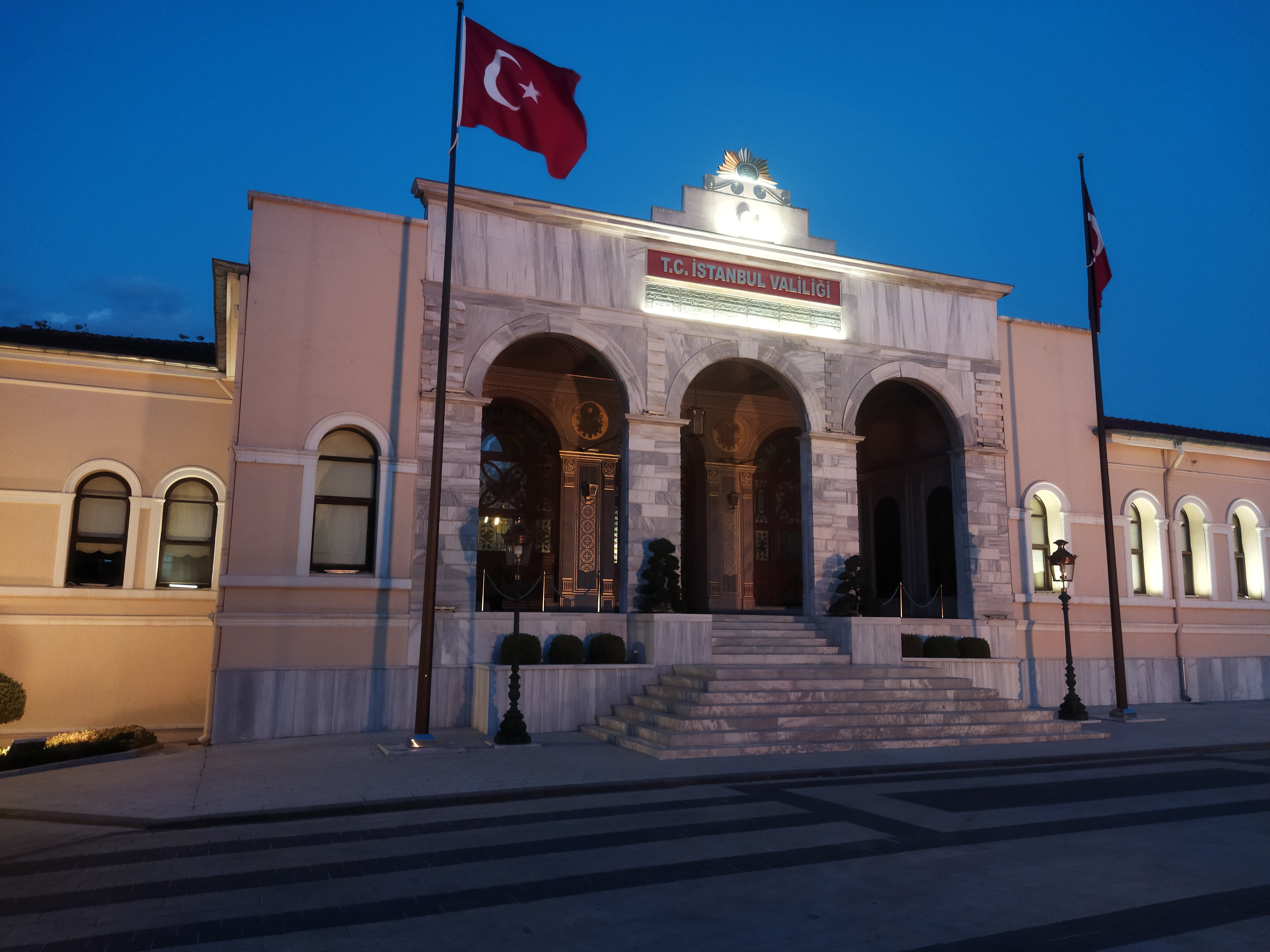
Governorship of İstanbul, the main building located in Fatih, İstanbul

Civilian administration is one of the two pillars of local government in Turkey. Every province is headed by a provincial governor, who is the ultimate civilian authority in the province. Similarly, districts are headed by a district governor, who is the ultimate civilian authority in a district. However, district governors are subordinate to the provincial governor of the province their district is in. The governor is the highest administrator for local departments/divisions of ministries, general directorates, or presidencies. These governors are appointed by the president and do not require confirmation from the national assembly. The position also has no term limit, though governors generally do not last longer than the government, as the incoming government will appoint new governors closer to their political beliefs.

With their title as the head of all local divisions and departments of ministries and their dependent directorates, governors act as the head of the police force, have the power to inspect all government facilities excluding military installations or other areas operated by the Turkish Armed Forces and judicial institutions, can issue orders to government employees working in the aforementioned local divisions or departments, order a curfew or lockdown when deemed necessary, ban all or certain vehicles from traffic as a precaution against adverse weather, order an investigation into a crime, and can undertake other actions when deemed necessary to maintain order and safety. Governors of both tiers also have the sometimes controversial power to ban all demonstrations for up to 15 days or to declare any given demonstration illegal. Governors may exercise these rights and authorities province-wide if they're the provincial governor, or within their district, if they're a district governor.

Governors also have the authority to inspect all tiers of local administration and to give directives to mayors and other officials involved in local administration asking for a resolution to certain problems. In addition to this, any decision taken by any level of local administration is deemed invalid unless a copy of the said decision is sent to the provincial governor's office within 7 days. The governor cannot veto these decisions, but a copy must be sent nevertheless for the decision to be valid.

== Local administration ==
Local administration is the second pillar of Turkish local government. Unlike the civilian administration, and with the exception of the special provincial administration headed by the provincial governor, local administrative authorities are directly or indirectly elected by the people living in the area. Local administration is responsible for local services such as transport, land use, waste collection, water, gas and parks, and other recreational facilities. As such, the heads of these authorities do not have the same authority over government agencies as the governor does. However, local authorities enjoy exclusive rights to operate and/or contract operations of public transport, paid or unpaid parking, parks, streets, and other local services. The extent to which these authorities can regulate and operate these services depends on the type of local administration. In general, there are three types of local administrative authorities: Municipalities (of which there are three types: "standard" municipalities, metropolitan municipalities, and 2nd tier municipalities), Special provincial administrations, and Muhtarlıklar, a position that is filled by one person and one without any significant authority. The main distinction between these three authorities is how they are established.

Types of local administrative authorities by province population
Province population	Type of provincial local administration	Type of district local administration
below 750.000	Special Provincial Administration	Municipality
above 750.000	Metropolitan municipality	2nd tier municipality

=== Municipalities ===
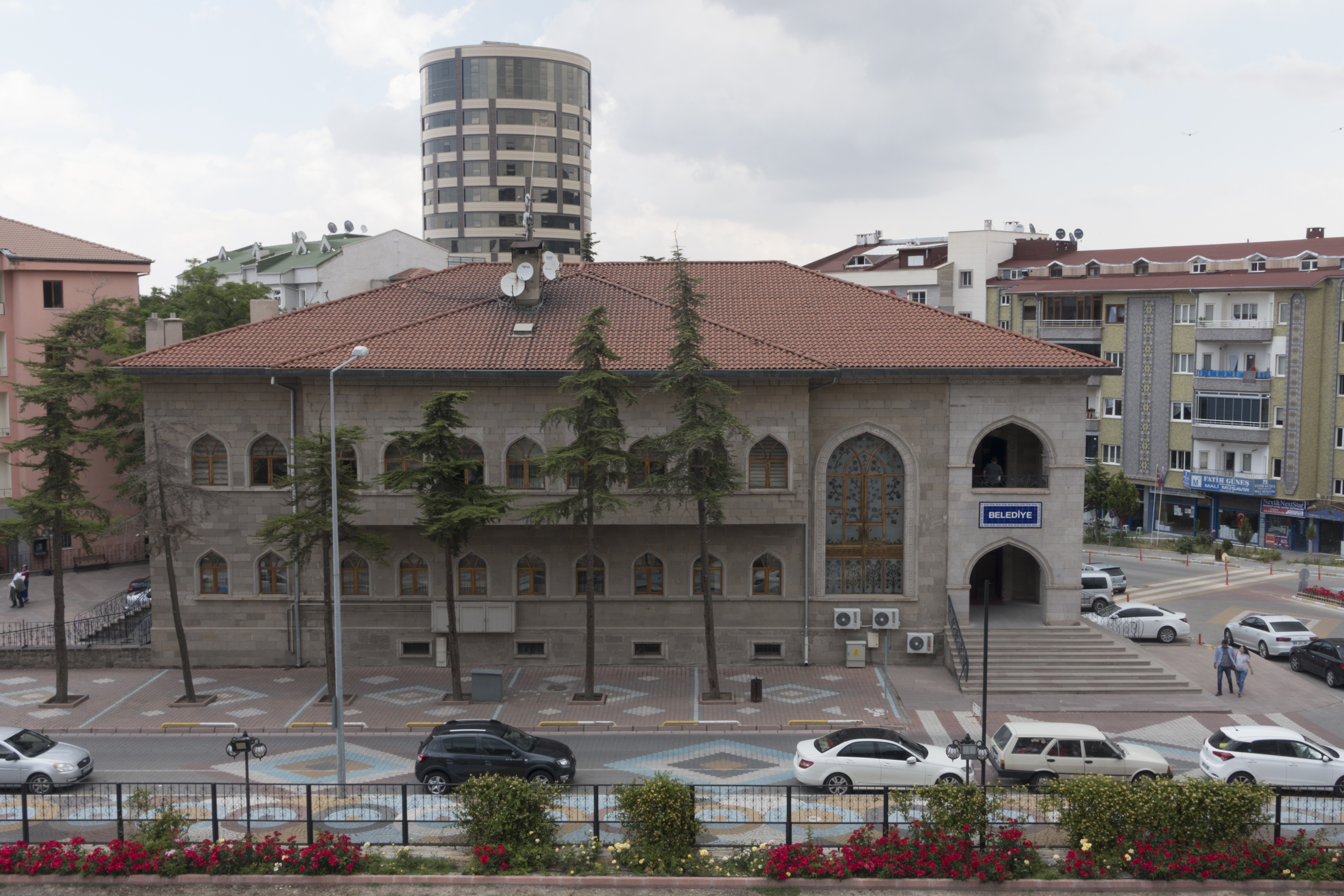
Nevşehir Municipality, a "standard" municipality providing services in the provincial center of Nevşehir. For rural areas or other district centers, the Special Provincial Administration of Nevşehir and the corresponding district municipalities would provide service respectively, as Nevşehir hasn't achieved metropolitan municipality status.

Municipalities are the building block of the local administration system. By law, municipalities may be established in any inhabited area with a population of over 5000, and they must be established in provincial or district centers regardless of population. There is no requirement for the borders of a municipality to line up with the borders of any district or province, only that there must be a minimum distance of 5001m between the new municipality and any other existing municipality, heritage site, or drinking water basin. These "normal" or "standard" municipalities, referred to as just municipalities in law, are responsible for the operation of local services within their borders.

==== Structure of municipalities ====
Municipalities are made up of three organs: the mayor, the municipal council, and the municipal committee. The mayor and the municipal council are directly elected, and the municipal committee is made up of members elected by the municipal council among its councilors and members appointed by the mayor. The mayor is the head of the municipality and the representative of its corporate identity. The municipal council is the main deliberative assembly of the municipality, and the municipal committee is a secondary assembly mainly tasked with providing checks and balances to the mayor's otherwise unchallenged executive authority, mainly deciding on fiscal matters.

===== The mayor =====
The mayor of a municipality is the head of the municipality and also the primary representative of its corporate identity. Mayors are elected every 5 years in accordance with the Constitution, and mayoral elections are based on a first-past-the-post system where the candidate with the highest number of votes is declared the winner. Mayors may not be a part of the administrative and supervisory divisions of their political parties during their terms, and they are also banned from executive positions in professional sports clubs. The mayor, as the ultimate authority within a municipality, is tasked with representing the municipality in an official capacity, running and overseeing the day-to-day operations of the municipality and municipal services in accordance with the strategic plan that has been approved by the municipal council, and general oversight of municipal finances and correspondence with other governmental agencies.

===== The municipal council =====
Municipal councils are the primary policymaking authorities of municipalities. Municipal councils are made up of councilors directly elected by the people living within the boundaries of the municipality. The number of councilors varies with the population of the given municipality. The mayor is the president of the municipal council, and the deputy presidents are elected by the councilors among themselves during the first council meeting after a local election. A minimum of two clerks are also elected in the same fashion. The two deputy presidents, the clerks, and the mayor form the presidium.

The municipal council meets during the first week of the month, on a day previously decided by the council. The mayor may decide on a day if no such day was decided upon. Each meeting of the council consists of multiple sessions and may last up to 5 days, or 20 if the municipal budget is being discussed. The mayor may also call for emergency meetings that may not exceed one session, up to three times a year.

The municipal council is tasked and/or authorized with: discussing and accepting the municipal budget, discussing and accepting the zoning and land use proposal, discussing and approving long or short-term strategic plans and operational reports from the municipality and associated corporations, authorize the mayor to take out loans on the municipality's behalf, discuss and decide on the purchase, sale, and renting out of municipal property, name public rights of way, authorize the municipality to provide services to areas outside municipal limits, and other minor functions. The municipal council acts as a check on the mayor, and its approval is generally needed for major changes in municipal policy and structure.

The municipal council cannot dismiss or issue a vote of no confidence against the mayor. However, the municipal council may choose to deem the operational report of the municipality as "unsatisfactory", in which case the mayor will be referred to the Council of State, where the municipal council's evaluation of the report will be discussed. If the Council of State sides with the municipal council that the report was "unsatisfactory", the mayor is deemed to be dismissed and the municipal council chooses a new mayor.

==== Responsibilities of municipalities ====
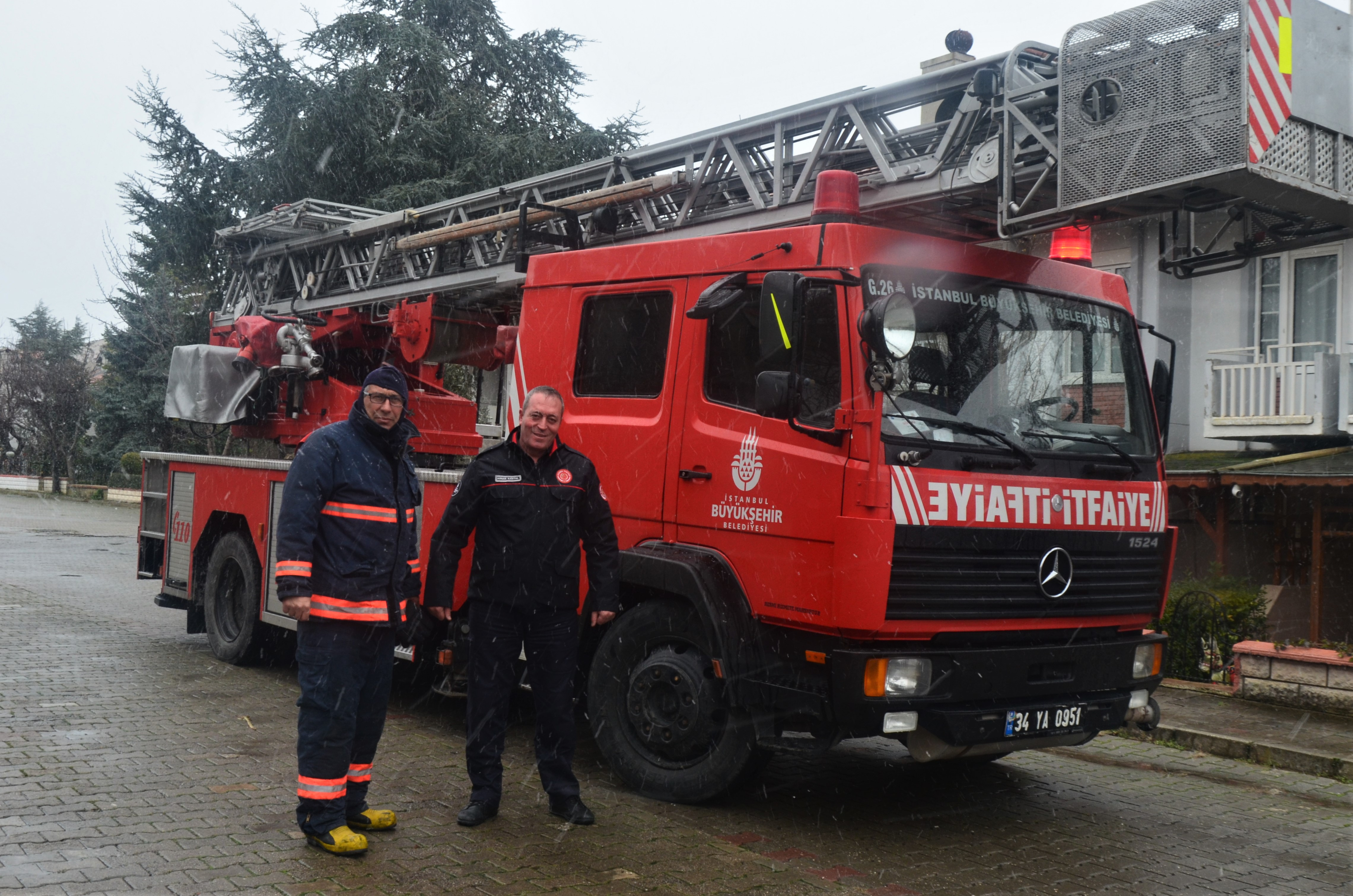
Firetruck and firefighters from the Istanbul Metropolitan Municipality's fire department. Firefighting and fire prevention are services municipalities are obligated to provide.

Municipalities are tasked with operating/providing or contracting the following services:

- Zoning and land use,
- Urban infrastructure,
- Environmental services,
- Waste management,
- Zabıta (municipal police with limited jurisdiction),
- Fire brigade,
- Search and rescue, and EMS,
- Parks and green spaces,
- Student housing,
- Housing,
- Tourism and promotion of the city,
- Shelters for women & children (when municipality population is higher than 100.000, otherwise optional),

in addition to these, municipalities may choose to do the following:

- Provide material, building, or any other type of support to state-run schools
- Operate hospitals, clinics, or any other type of healthcare services,
- Conservation of historically or culturally significant buildings and areas,
- Support amateur sports organizations with grants and equipment support, give awards to successful athletes,
- Store food.
