= Chen Shih-chung =

Taiwanese dentist and politician (born 1952)

- 陳時中
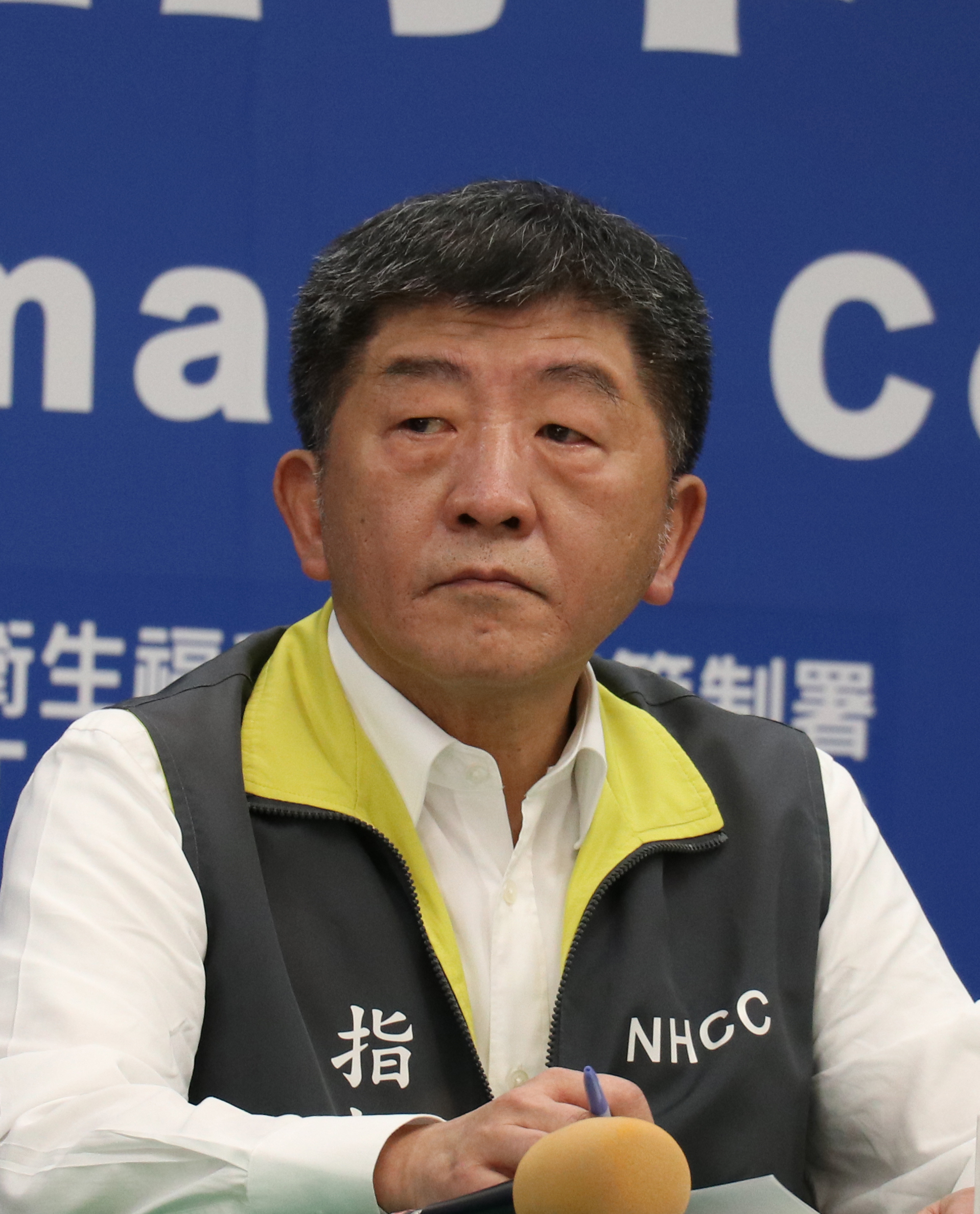
- Chen in 2020

Minister without Portfolio
- Incumbent
- Assumed office 20 May 2024
- Prime Minister: Cho Jung-tai

4th Minister of Health and Welfare
- In office 8 February 2017 – 17 July 2022
- Prime Minister: Lin Chuan; William Lai; Su Tseng-chang
- Deputy: See list: Ho Chi-kung, Lu Pau-ching Ho Chi-kung, Su Li-chiung (Deputy) Tsai Sen-tien Hsueh Jui-yuan (Vice)
- Preceded by: Lin Tzou-yien
- Succeeded by: Hsueh Jui-yuan
- Commander-General of the Central Epidemic Command Center
- In office 24 January 2020 – 17 July 2022
- Prime Minister: Su Tseng-chang
- Deputy: Chen Tsung-yen
- Preceded by: Chou Jih-haw
- Succeeded by: Wang Pi-sheng

National Policy Advisor to the President
- In office 20 May 2016 – 7 February 2017
- President: Tsai Ing-wen

Deputy Minister of Department of Health
- In office 29 June 2005 – 20 May 2008
- Minister: Hou Sheng-mao

Personal details
- Born: December 27, 1952 (age 73) Taipei, Taiwan
- Party: Democratic Progressive Party
- Spouse: Sun Wan-ling
- Children: 2 sons
- Education: Taipei Medical University (DDS)
- Profession: Dentist

Chinese name
- Traditional Chinese: 陳時中
- Simplified Chinese: 陈时中
Transcriptions
Standard Mandarin
- Hanyu Pinyin: Chén Shízhōng
- Wade–Giles: Chʻên2 Shih2-chung1
Southern Min
- Hokkien POJ: Tân Sî-tiong

Chen Shih-chung (Chinese: 陳時中; pinyin: Chén Shízhōng; born December 27, 1952) is a Taiwanese dental surgeon and politician. He served as the head of the Ministry of Health and Welfare from 2017 to 2022. During the COVID-19 pandemic, he gained widespread recognition as the leading authority on the COVID-19 pandemic in Taiwan. A member of the Democratic Progressive Party (DPP), he was the party's nominee to be the mayor of Taipei during the 2022 local elections, but lost to Chiang Wan-an.

== Early life and education ==
Chen was born in Taipei, Taiwan, on December 27, 1952. On his father's side, he was descended from a prominent academic family in Kaohsiung. One of his aunts, Sun Chen-ching (孫陳錦), was a centenarian who worked as designer for Nippon Light Metal. His father, Chen Chi-yen (陳棋炎), was a professor of civil law at National Taiwan University who was educated in Japan. During the White Terror, Chi-yen was a minor political dissident in Taiwan.

In 1968, Chen began attending Taipei Municipal Chien Kuo High School. After graduation, he enrolled at Taipei Medical University in 1971 to study dentistry and earned his Doctor of Dental Surgery (D.D.S.) in 1977.

== Early career ==
Chen became the director of Taipei City Dentists Association in 1987 and stayed in the position until he was promoted to executive director in 1991. In 1993–1995, he was the president of the association. In 1995–1999, he was the president of Taiwan Dental Association and in 1995-2005 executive director and CEO of the association.

== Political career ==
In 1995–1996, he was the commissioner of the medical review committee of the Health Department of Taipei City Government. In 1993–1998 and 1999–2000, he was the commissioner of the dentist advisory committee of the Department of Health. In 1996-1999 and 2005–2006, he was the commissioner of the national health insurance supervisory committee of the department. At the same time (1996-2008), he was also the commissioner of the national health insurance medical expenditure negotiation committee of the department.

=== Ministry of Health and Welfare ===
At a press conference after being sworn in as the health and welfare minister on 8 February 2017, Chen said that he would continue the current policy of the ministry and would try to avoid big personnel changes.

=== 2017 World Health Assembly ===
Chen flew to Geneva, Switzerland, and arrived on 20 May 2017 despite the absence of invitation for Taiwan to attend the World Health Assembly in 2017. The Ministry of Foreign Affairs made the arrangement for Chen to attend bilateral meetings outside the assembly including other events, such as press conference, interviews and Taiwan Night held by non-governmental organization.

=== COVID-19 pandemic ===
Chen has become widely recognized in Taiwan as the main speaker at daily press conferences given by the Taiwan Centre for Disease Control (CDC). His approval rating in a poll released on 26 March 2020 was 91%. A 26 April 2022 poll revealed that Taiwanese were split over the government's policy to "coexist with COVID", with slightly more people opposed than in favor. Among the respondents, 46.3% percent stated that they disapproved of the policy, and 45% indicated their approval.
On 7 May 2022, Taiwan reported 46,377 new cases, overtaking the United States as the highest daily new case region. Chen said it is on track to reach up to 100,000 new infections daily.

Chen tested positive for COVID-19 on 12 June, and recovered on 24 June.

== 2022 Taipei mayoralty election ==
Chen was named the Democratic Progressive Party candidate for the Taipei mayoralty in July 2022. On 14 July 2022, Chen announced his resignation from the Ministry of Health and Welfare, citing a need to focus on his first campaign for electoral office. He formally stepped down on 18 July 2022. In the election held 26 November 2022, Chen lost to Chiang Wan-an.

2022 Taipei mayoral election result
Party	#	Candidate	Votes	Percentage
Kuomintang (KMT)	6	Chiang Wan-an (蔣萬安)	575,590	42.29%
Democratic Progressive (DPP)	12	Chen Shih-chung (陳時中)	434,558	31.93%
Independent	8	Huang Shan-shan (黃珊珊)	342,141	25.14%
Others			8,662	0.64%
Total			1,360,951	100.00%
Voter turnout			67.70%	

== Personal life ==
Chen raised two children. His family also has a dog, Yenpa.
