= Shih Chung-liang =

- 石崇良
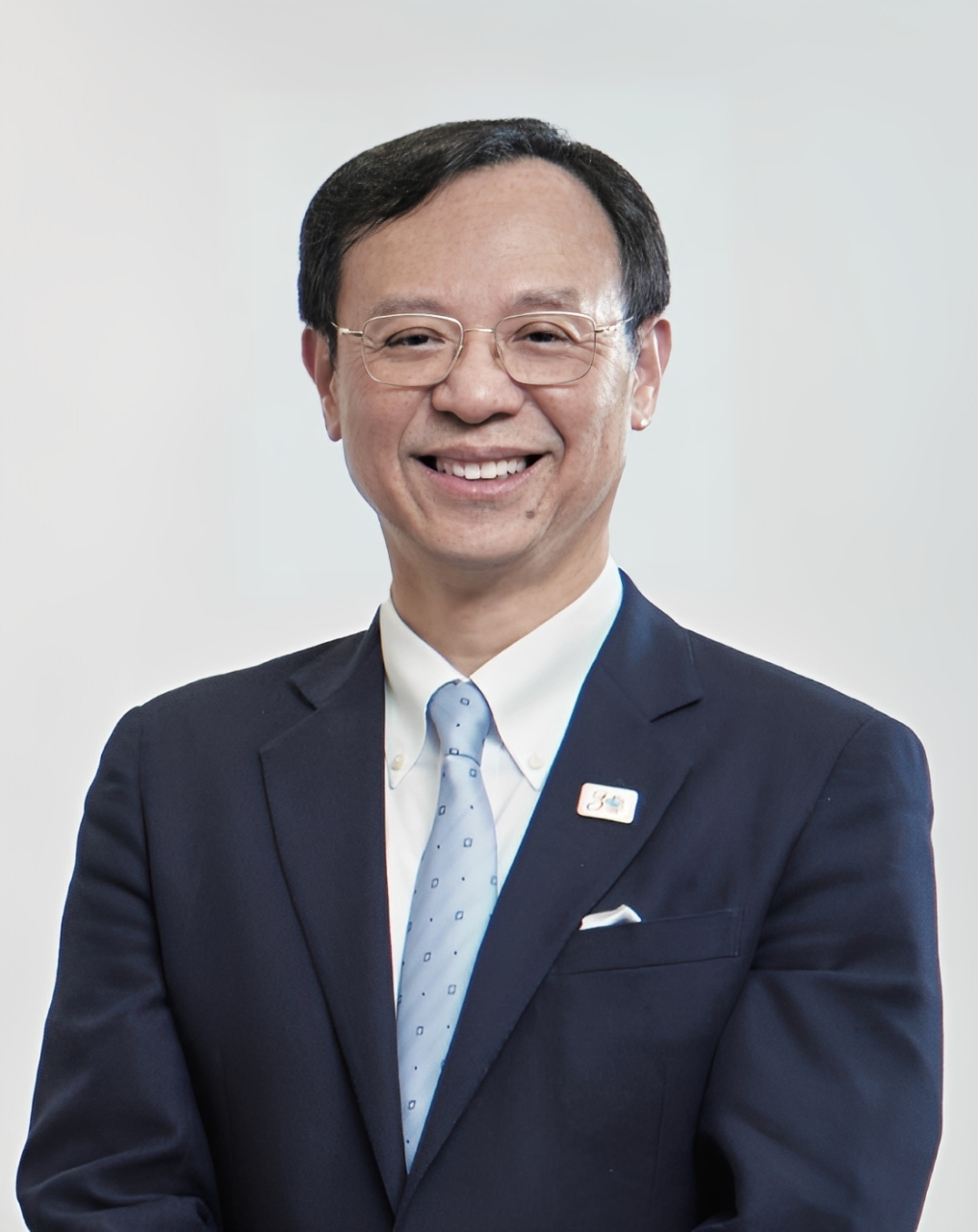
- Official portrait, 2025

7th Minister of Health and Welfare
- Incumbent
- Assumed office 1 September 2025
- Prime Minister: Cho Jung-tai
- Preceded by: Chiu Tai-yuan
Additional positions
2nd Executive Secretary of the Healthy Taiwan Promotion Committee
Incumbent
Assumed office 1 September 2025
President	Lai Ching-te
Preceded by	Chiu Tai-yuan
Member of the Whole-of-Society Defense Resilience Committee (Government Representative)
Incumbent
Assumed office 1 September 2025
President	Lai Ching-te
Preceded by	Chiu Tai-yuan
1st Deputy Executive Secretary of the Healthy Taiwan Promotion Committee
In office 22 August 2024 – 31 August 2025
President	Lai Ching-te
Preceded by	Position established
Succeeded by	Cheng Chun-sheng
3rd Director-General of the National Health Insurance Administration
In office 6 February 2023 – 31 August 2025
Minister	Hsueh Jui-yuan; Chiu Tai-yuan
Preceded by	Lee Chen-hua (acting)
Succeeded by	Chen Liang-yu
Administrative Deputy Minister of Health and Welfare
In office 1 September 2020 – 5 February 2023
Minister	Chen Shih-chung; Hsueh Jui-yuan
Succeeded by	Chou Jih-haw

Personal details
- Born: 20 November 1965 (age 60)
- Party: Independent
- Education: Kaohsiung Medical University (MD); National Taiwan University (PhD)

Shih Chung-liang (Chinese: 石崇良; born 20 November 1965) is a Taiwanese physician who has served as Minister of Health and Welfare since 2025.

== Education and career ==
Shih attended medical school at Kaohsiung Medical University, where he earned a Doctor of Medicine (M.D.) in 1991. After graduation, he was an attending physician in emergency medicine at National Taiwan University Hospital from 1998 to 2007. While practicing, he earned his Ph.D. in public health, health policy, and health management from National Taiwan University in 2006. His doctoral dissertation was titled, "An epidemiological study of adverse events in emergency medicine" (急診醫療不良事件之流行病學研究).

From February 6, 2023, to August 31, 2025, Shih was the director-general of the National Health Insurance Administration of the Ministry of Health. Previously, he served as the ministry's head of medical affairs and as deputy health minister. On August 30, 2025, he was confirmed to succeed Chiu Tai-yuan as health minister, and took office on September 1. As minister, he took over supervision of the ministry's "Healthy Taiwan" initiative, aimed to increase sustainable development.
