= Chiu Tai-yuan =

Taiwanese physician

- 邱泰源
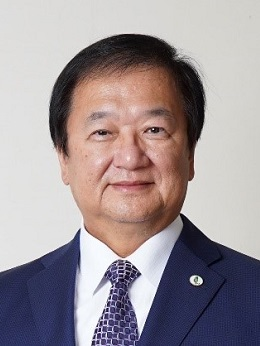
- Official portrait, 2019

6th Minister of Health and Welfare
- In office 20 May 2024 – 1 September 2025
- Prime Minister: Cho Jung-tai
- Deputy: Lin Ching-yi; Chou Jih-haw
- Preceded by: Hsueh Jui-yuan
- Succeeded by: Shih Chung-liang
Additional positions
1st Executive Secretary of the Healthy Taiwan Promotion Committee
In office 22 August 2024 – 1 September 2025
President	Lai Ching-te
Preceded by	Position established
Succeeded by	Shih Chung-liang
Member of the Whole-of-Society Defense Resilience Committee (Government Representative)
In office 26 September 2024 – 1 September 2025
President	Lai Ching-te
Preceded by	Position established
Succeeded by	Shih Chung-liang

Member of the Legislative Yuan
- In office 4 October 2016 – 1 February 2024
- Preceded by: Hsu Kuo-yung
- Constituency: Party-list

Personal details
- Born: October 30, 1956 (age 69)
- Party: Democratic Progressive Party
- Education: China Medical University (MD); University of Tokyo (MHS)

Chiu Tai-yuan (Chinese: 邱泰源; born 30 October 1956) is a Taiwanese physician who was the Minister of Health and Welfare from 2024 to 2025.

== Education ==
Chiu enrolled at China Medical University in 1976 and graduated with his Doctor of Medicine (M.D.) in 1983. He then earned a Master of Health Science (M.H.S.) from the University of Tokyo in 1995.

== Political career ==
In 2015, Chiu was nominated by the Democratic Progressive Party (DPP) for the proportional representation constituency in the 2016 Taiwanese legislative election, listed 22nd in the party-list, but was not elected.

In October 2016, after legislator Hsu Kuo-yung transfer to the Executive Yuan serving as spokesperson, Chiu was elected by substitute. Chiu was re-elected in 2020.

On 19 April 2024, then prime minister-designate Cho Jung-tai announced that Chiu would be the new minister of Health and Welfare in the new cabinet. On 1 September 2025, he was succeeded as minister by Shih Chung-liang.
