= COVID-19 cluster infection incident at Taiwan Taoyuan International Airport =

2022 disease outbreak in Taiwan

Taiwan Taoyuan International Airport COVID-19 cluster
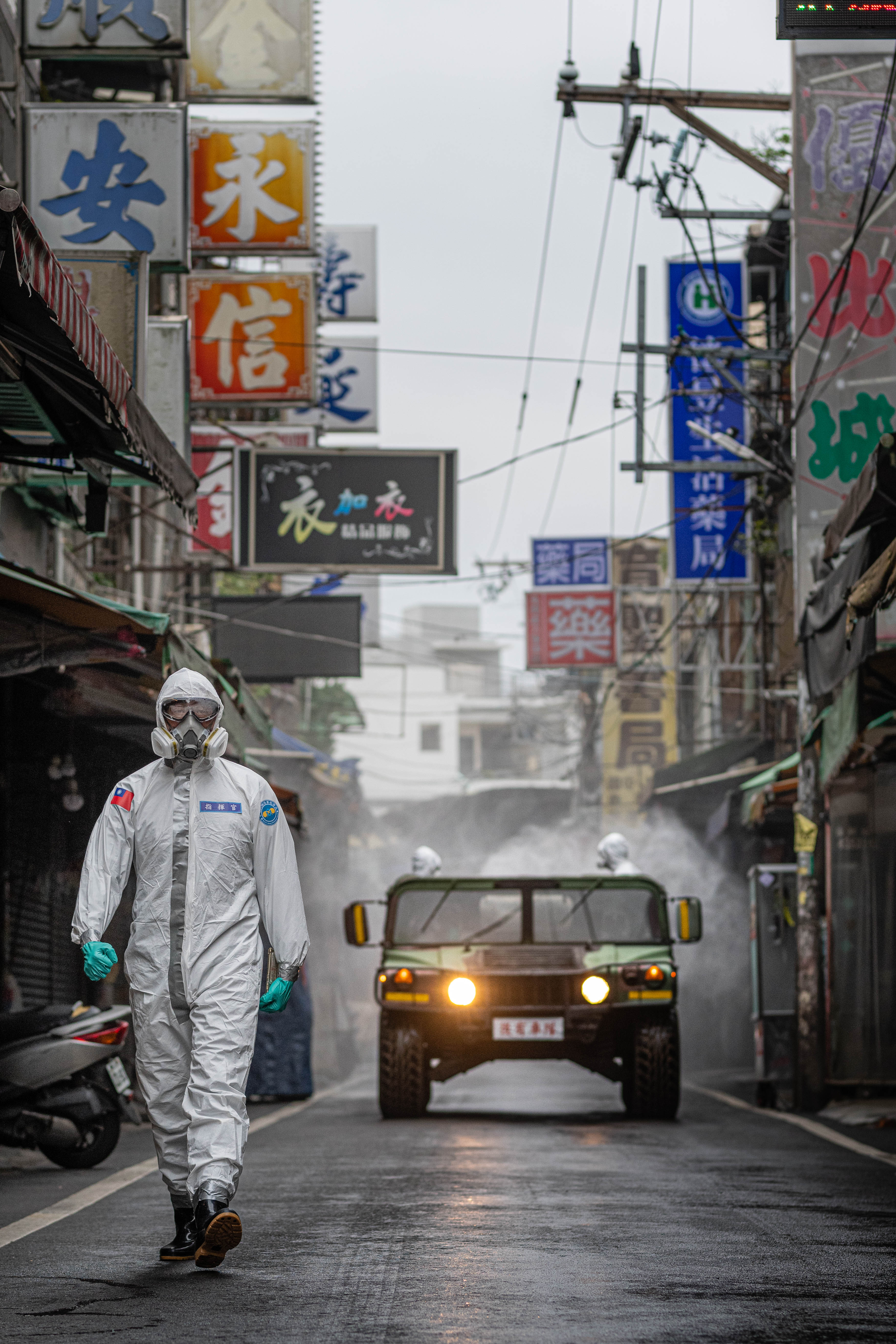
- Members of the Taoyuan City Government disinfection team and the ROC Army 33rd Chemical Warfare Group conduct large-scale disinfection operations at Zhongzhen Market on 5 January 2022.
- Disease: COVID-19
- Location: Taoyuan City, Taiwan
- Index case: Case 17230
- Date: 3 January 2022 – 23 March 2022
- Confirmed cases: 925
- Deaths: 1

The Taiwan Taoyuan International Airport COVID-19 cluster, also known as the Taoyuan Airport cluster, was a cluster of COVID-19 infections that began on 2 January 2022 at Taiwan Taoyuan International Airport in Taoyuan City, Taiwan. On 3 January, the Central Epidemic Command Center (CECC) announced that a parking lot cleaner at the airport had tested positive for COVID-19; the case had previously operated a stall at Zhongzhen Market. The following day, after the number of linked infections increased to four, the Central Epidemic Command Center (CECC) immediately established a forward command post at the airport in response. As of 23 February, a total of 789 people had been confirmed in connection with the cluster, including cleaners, epidemic-prevention taxi drivers, airport security personnel, members of the Golden Voice Singing Club, baggage cart workers, home-care workers, electronics factory employees, bank employees, restaurant staff and customers, teachers and students, motorcycle shop workers, factory workers, their household contacts, and cases identified through expanded contact tracing. The ages of those infected ranged from under five years old to over seventy.

== Course of events ==
=== Early cases ===
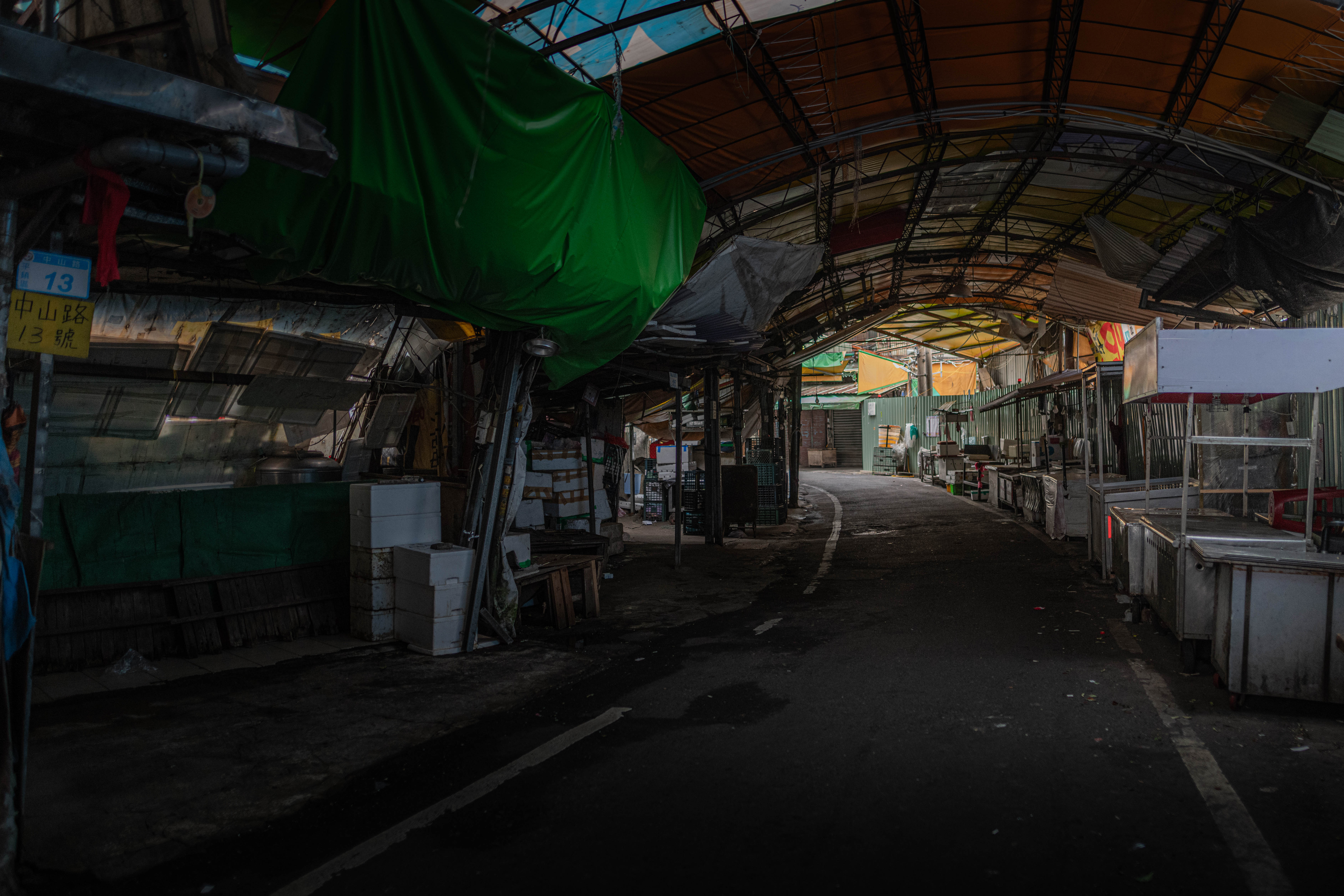
Case 17230 previously ran a market stall at Zhongzhen Market in the Zhongli District of Taoyuan City.

During the COVID-19 pandemic in Taiwan, airports were regarded as high-risk areas. Cleaning services at Taiwan Taoyuan International Airport were provided by Shin Shih Security Services.On 2 January, a Taiwanese woman in her 40s who worked as a cleaner in the airport's epidemic-prevention vehicle parking area developed fever and cough symptoms. She tested positive for COVID-19 the following day, with a Ct value of only 11. The CECC announced the locally transmitted case that evening. She had no recent travel history and had received two doses of the Oxford–AstraZeneca COVID-19 vaccine. On the mornings of 30 and 31 December, during the New Year's holiday period, she had operated a stall at Zhongzhen Market in Zhongli District, Taoyuan City. The Taoyuan Department of Health urgently tested her six household members, all of whom returned negative results.

On the afternoon of 4 January, the CECC officially announced four new local cases. They included three cleaners working in the parking area of Taiwan Taoyuan International Airport (Cases 17230, 17238, and 17239) and one epidemic-prevention taxi driver (Case 17240). Case 17230 was preliminarily identified as being infected with the Omicron variant of SARS-CoV-2, while Case 17239 developed symptoms on 1 January and had a Ct value of approximately 24.[7] Case 17240 developed symptoms on 1 January and had transported passengers infected with the Omicron variant on 26 and 31 December. He became the first epidemic-prevention taxi driver in Taiwan to test positive.That afternoon Lin Yu-chang, Mayor of Keelung, stated that Case 17240 rented residences in both Keelung and Taoyuan and lived with a friend in Keelung, who was subsequently placed under home quarantine and tested. That evening, the Keelung City Government announced that the test result was negative.

On the morning of 5 January, Cheng Wen-tsan, Mayor of Taoyuan, announced at an epidemic-prevention meeting that another cleaner employed by Reliance Group had tested positive. In the afternoon, the CECC officially announced one new local case, a Taiwanese woman in her 50s (Case 17266) who worked as a cleaner at Taiwan Taoyuan International Airport.She had received two doses of the Moderna COVID-19 vaccine and worked at the same workplace as Cases 17230, 17238, and 17239, and had commuted with them on the same shuttle route. She developed cough and throat discomfort on 3 January and tested positive through self-testing, with a Ct value of 16. On the same day, the CECC announced that genomic sequencing had confirmed that Case 17240 was infected with the Omicron variant. In addition, an imported case previously announced on 2 January (Case 17181) was reclassified as a locally transmitted case after epidemiological investigation determined that it was linked to Case 16941. That evening, the CECC announced three additional confirmed cases, all night-shift cleaners employed by Reliance Group through subcontracting, who had been identified through expanded testing. Their overlapping exposure was mainly associated with the employee shuttle bus used after work.

=== Increase in cases ===
Secondary cluster	Confirmed cases
Airport cleaners, security personnel, and Golden Voice Singing Club-related cases	26
Airport baggage cart workers and home-care workers-related cases	22
Union Bank Jianxing Branch-related cases	23
Xi Di Restaurant-related cases	165
Others	690 (674)
Total	926 (910)

=== Daily trend of case increases and decreases ===
==== Distribution of cumulative domestic COVID-19 cases in Taiwan ====
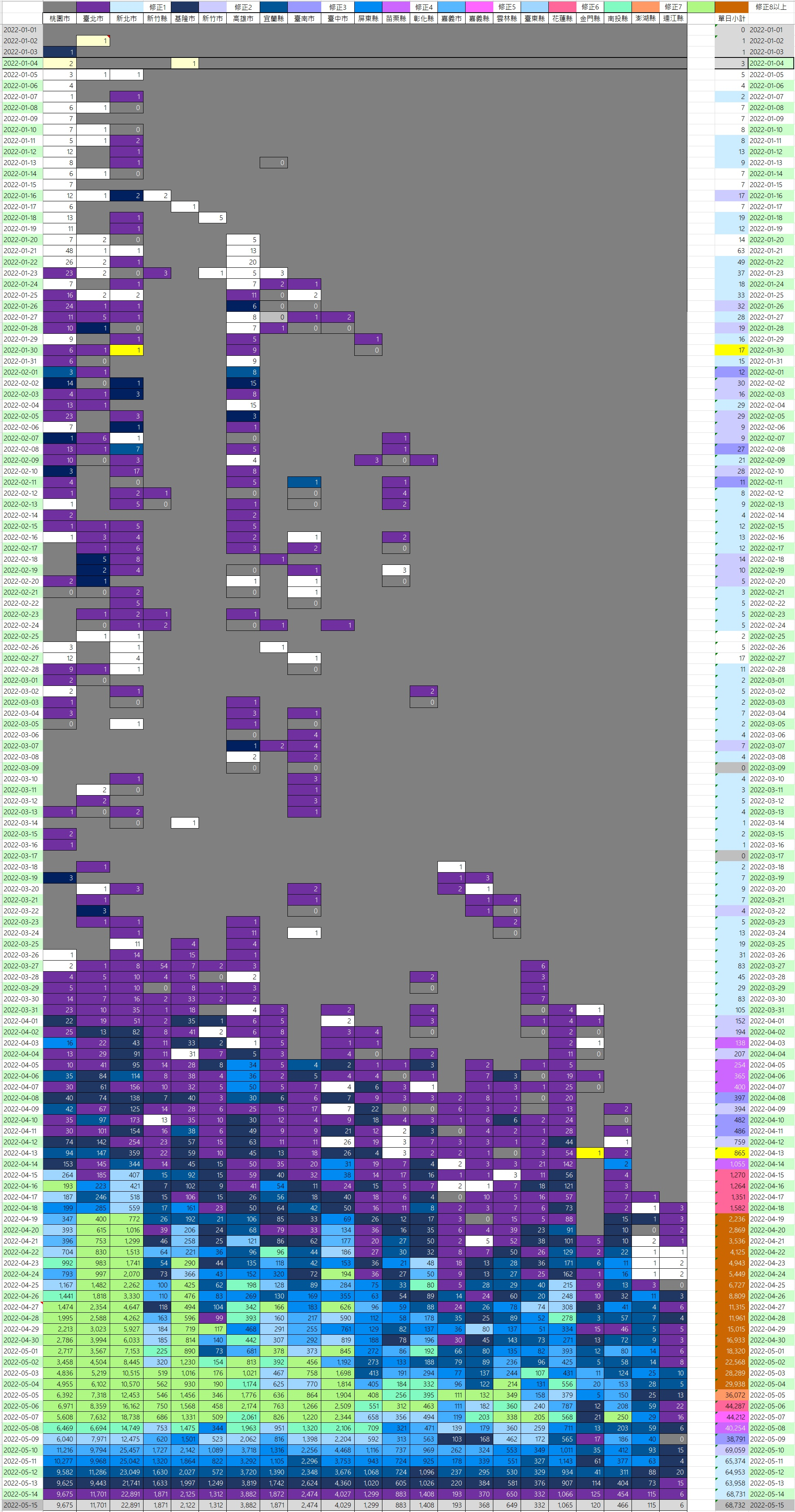
This presents the daily new and cumulative case counts—along with ongoing statistical revisions—for various regions in Taiwan (covering the period from January 1, 2022, to May 14, 2022); the counties and cities are listed in the order in which the events unfolded.

Data cover the period from 1 January to 14 May 2022, with a cumulative total of 763,049 confirmed cases.

Location (city/county)	Cumulative cases
New Taipei City	268,616
Taipei City	143,162
Taoyuan City	124,154
Taichung City	41,552
Kaohsiung City	35,783
Keelung City	27,713
Tainan City	22,153
Yilan County	15,607
Hsinchu County	14,621
Hualien County	12,976
Pingtung County	10,757
Changhua County	9,892
Miaoli County	6,401
Yunlin County	6,359
Nantou County	3,739
Taitung County	3,726
Chiayi County	3,333
Chiayi City	2,206
Hsinchu City	1,187
Penghu County	772
Kinmen County	564
Lienchiang County	181

Note: Data are compiled from statistics provided by the National Center for High-performance Computing. Figures are subject to rolling adjustments due to differences in data retrieval times and the reassignment of case records between jurisdictions.

=== Death cases (domestic cases) ===
On 15 February, following postmortem epidemiological investigations, the Central Epidemic Command Center announced one additional death case on the same day. The deceased (Case 18138) was a Taiwanese woman in her 80s from northern Taiwan with a history of chronic illnesses. Due to medical needs, she had been admitted for isolation on 10 January. She tested positive before completing her isolation period on 19 January and was confirmed with COVID-19 on 20 January, after which she remained in isolation and received treatment. She died on 4 February. The case was identified as a contact related to Case 17368, which was associated with the Golden Voice Singing Club cluster.

== Prevention measures ==
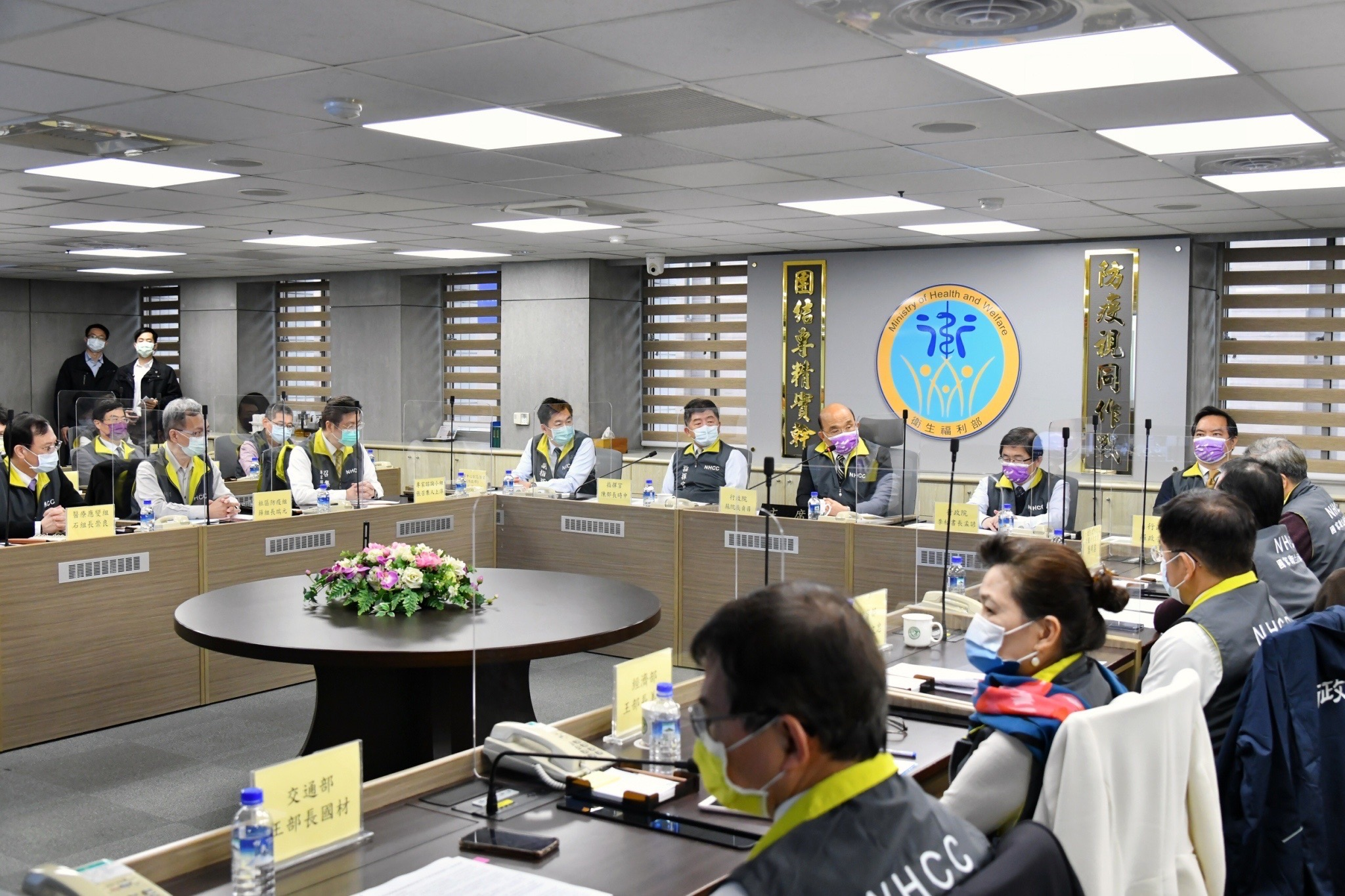
On January 4, 2022, the Central Epidemic Command Center for Severe Special Infectious Pneumonia established a forward command post at Taiwan Taoyuan International Airport.

=== Central Epidemic Command Center ===
On the afternoon of 4 January, in response to four locally transmitted cases in Taoyuan City, Minister of Health and Welfare and CECC commander Chen Shih-chung announced that enhanced epidemic prevention measures would be implemented in Taoyuan City from that day until 17 January. Residents were required to wear masks at all times when outside, with mask removal permitted only while eating or drinking; all other exemptions were suspended. Airport prevention measures were also strengthened, with epidemic-prevention taxi drivers required to undergo deep-throat saliva PCR testing every three days, airport staff required to take rapid tests once a week, and symptomatic individuals required to immediately undergo deep-throat saliva or nasopharyngeal PCR testing.

At around 4 p.m., Chen and deputy head of the medical response team Wang Pi-sheng traveled to the Taoyuan International Airport emergency response center to receive briefings from relevant agencies. They then inspected the passenger arrival procedures within the restricted area, reviewed epidemic prevention operations, and visited the epidemic-prevention taxi stand to thank drivers for their efforts.

Chen paid particular attention to coordination between the CECC and Taoyuan International Airport, and expressed hope that the airport's experience could be applied to other international airports handling arriving passengers. That evening, the CECC officially classified the outbreak as a cluster and approved the establishment of a forward command post at Taoyuan International Airport to contain the outbreak. Wang Pi-sheng was placed in charge of coordinating epidemic control efforts. The forward command post subsequently focused on three tasks: evaluating on-site operations, assessing risks along arrival routes, and implementing rapid screening. Initially, the CECC suspected two possible transmission routes, including infection through shared toilet facilities and cleaning activities. Chen emphasized that cleaners, epidemic-prevention taxi drivers, and hotel staff were frontline workers bearing risks in the same manner as healthcare personnel and should not be regarded as failures in epidemic prevention.

However, after several cases emerged among people who had no direct workplace or shuttle bus contact, Chen acknowledged that the situation was more complicated and suggested that multiple waves of transmission might already have occurred. Wang identified the toilets near baggage carousel No. 6 and the P3 parking lot toilets as possible sources of infection. On 6 January, Chen stated that the Omicron variant had already entered the local community and admitted that the expanding cluster had made the situation somewhat tense. On 7 January, he acknowledged that community transmission had occurred but said that, because the chain of transmission remained traceable, epidemic alert levels would not be raised. Wang also suggested that a comprehensive review of airport-wide testing might be necessary.

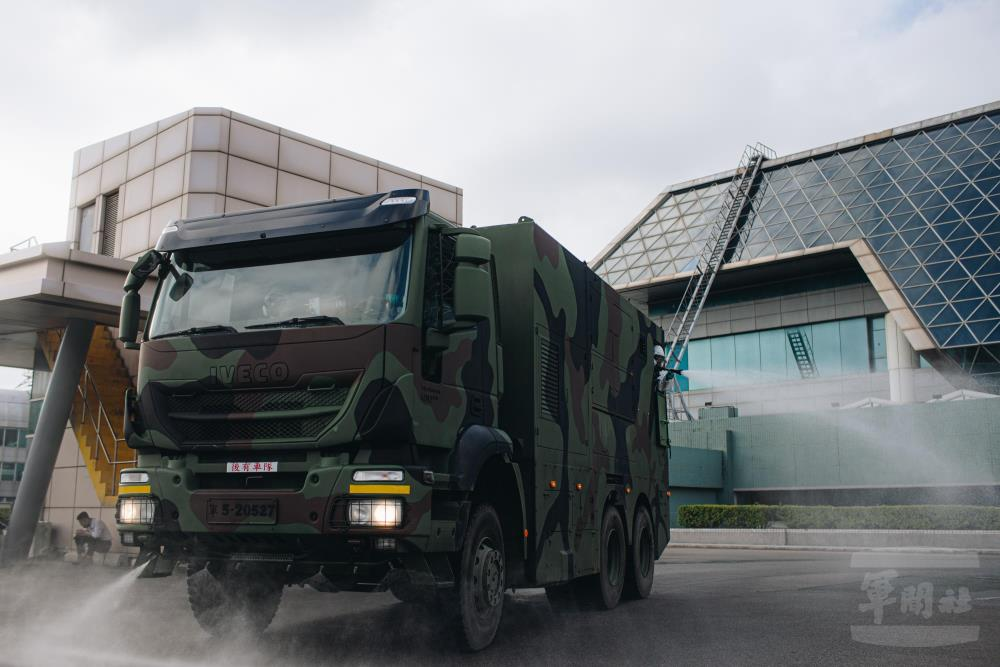
On January 4, 2022, the Army's 33rd Chemical Corps deployed to the parking lot of Taoyuan International Airport to conduct disinfection operations.

=== Taoyuan International Airport ===
On the afternoon of 3 January, Taoyuan International Airport Corporation received notification that an employee of a contracted cleaning company had tested positive. The company immediately expanded contact tracing and carried out extensive disinfection in areas where the employee had worked. Hundreds of epidemic-prevention taxi drivers were recalled for testing and were required to test negative before returning to service. The cleaning company identified 26 close contacts.

At 9 a.m. on 4 January, the33rd Chemical Corps of the Republic of China Army was deployed to Taoyuan International Airport to conduct another round of deep disinfection, focusing on Taoyuan International Airport Terminal 2, the P3 parking lot, taxi driver rest areas, toilets, and elevators. The airport corporation simultaneously disinfected the terminals. Beginning at 11 a.m., recalled epidemic-prevention taxi drivers underwent screening, which was completed by 12:30 p.m.

That afternoon, Taoyuan International Airport Corporation arranged large-scale testing for airport employees and employees of the Reliance Group, including 878 cleaning workers. No additional infections were found among contacts of the parking lot cleaners.

At 9 a.m. on 5 January, Wang Pi-sheng convened the first meeting of the forward command post and stated that passenger arrival routes would largely remain unchanged, though certain procedures would be adjusted and improved.Epidemic-prevention taxi drivers were provided with additional protective gowns and upgraded equipment.The command post also required enhanced testing procedures for airport personnel and epidemic-prevention taxi fleets, with representatives from Taoyuan International Airport and northern regional hospitals under the Taiwan Centers for Disease Control planning implementation. Taipei Songshan Airport and Kaohsiung International Airport adopted similar measures.

Testing of airport personnel was completed on the same day and follow-up monitoring continued. On 6 January, all 93 night-shift terminal cleaning staff employed by the contractor were transferred to centralized quarantine facilities. Employees not placed in quarantine were required to undergo rapid tests and all personnel were scheduled for PCR testing on 8 January. Apart from the seven cleaners who tested positive, all other employees tested negative. In response to the continuing infections, Reliance Group announced that it would strengthen four epidemic prevention measures. The forward command post also reviewed shuttle bus arrangements and required real-name registration and fixed seating assignments.

=== Community prevention ===
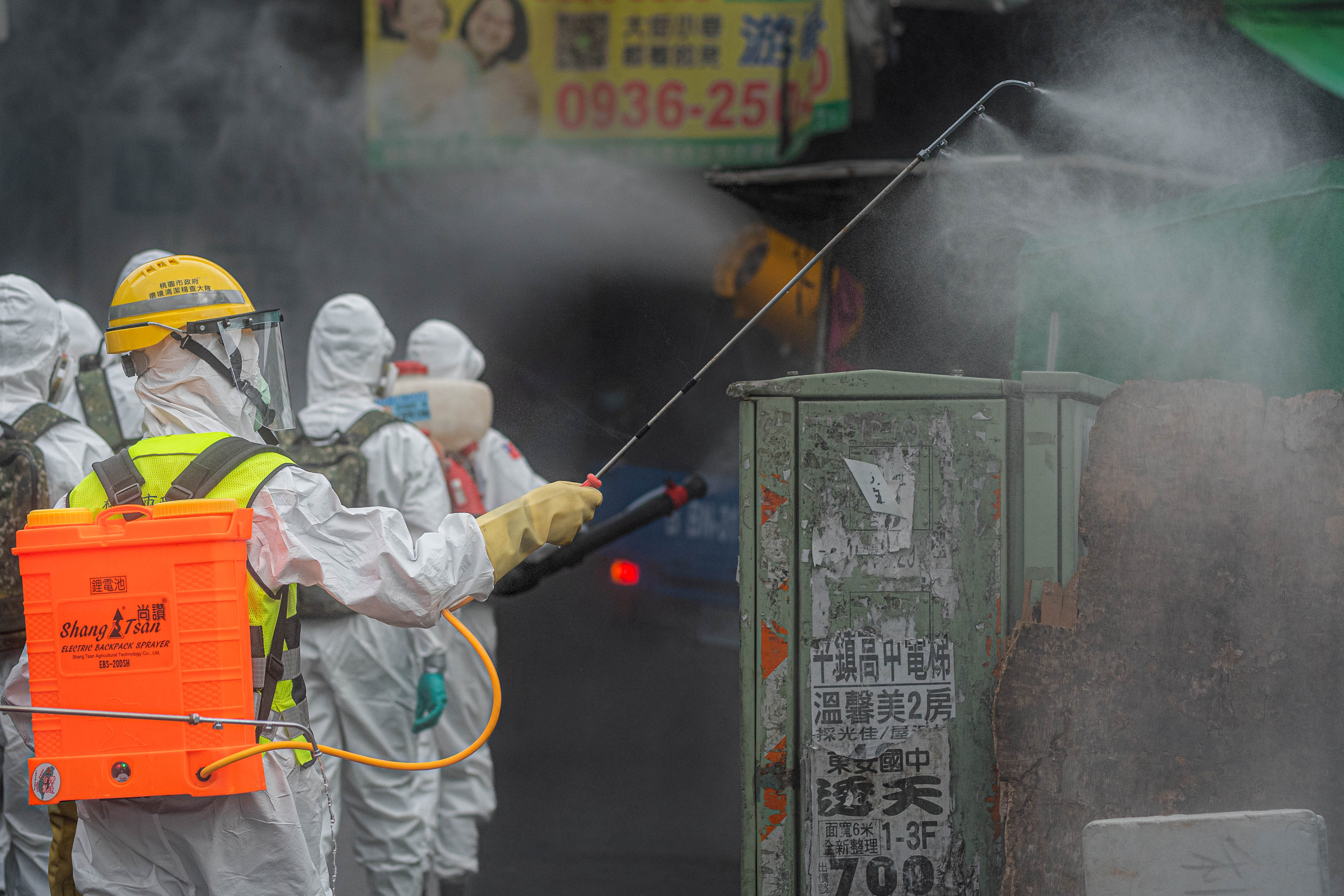
On January 5, 2022, the Taoyuan City Government's epidemic prevention and disinfection team and the Army's 33rd Chemical Corps conducted large-scale disinfection at Zhongzhen Market.

==== Taoyuan City ====
On 3 January, the Taoyuan Department of Health launched epidemiological investigations, while the CECC expanded contact tracing and testing. After receiving reports that students might have come into contact with confirmed cases during the New Year holiday, one elementary school and one senior high school suspended classes for one day beginning on 4 January, switched to online learning, and conducted campus disinfection. One elementary school class later continued online learning for a week.

Early on 4 January, Taoyuan Mayor Cheng Wen-tsan released the movement history of the infected cleaner. He announced the establishment of three free testing stations at Longgang Sports Ground, the Hakka Cultural Hall in northern Taoyuan, and Liming Park for residents living near Zhongzhen Market.Zhongzhen Market was closed for three days. At 2 p.m., the city's epidemic disinfection team and the 33rd Chemical Corps of the Republic of China Army carried out large-scale disinfection operations at the market and ten surrounding neighborhoods.

Cheng stated that the epidemic alert level remained Level 2 but urged residents to wear masks at all times.To prevent further spread, central and local authorities accelerated epidemiological investigations and testing. On 5 January, Wang Pi-sheng inspected the three community screening stations and urged more residents to undergo testing due to low turnout. Cheng likewise encouraged residents to get tested in order to identify hidden cases.

The Taoyuan City Government published the movement histories of four infected cleaners, including visits to the Golden Voice Singing Club, Carrefour, RT-Mart, Zhongbei Evening Market, Zhongli Bus, Taoyuan Bus, and Chunghwa Telecom service centers. On the same day, the Army's 33rd Chemical Corps conducted a second round of disinfection at Zhongzhen Market and expanded environmental disinfection to 23 neighborhoods in three districts.

That evening, after an elementary school student in Guanyin District was identified as a close contact, the school suspended classes for one day on 6 January, and a related kindergarten also closed for one day. Cheng later announced plans to expand community testing to prevent the virus from spreading further.

Beginning on 6 January, after confirmed cases were found to have visited the Golden Voice Singing Club for five consecutive days, the Taoyuan Department of Health tested approximately 800 club members. Authorities also released additional movement histories, including visits to a mutton hot pot restaurant and RT-Mart, and noted that one infected individual had played cards at the Golden Voice Singing Club on New Year's Eve. After one close contact from the club was identified as an elementary school student, another school suspended classes for one day.

On 7 January, Cheng described the situation as severe and announced expanded testing to identify hidden transmission chains.Wang Pi-sheng inspected the Golden Voice Singing Club and expanded contact tracing efforts.

On 10 January, the CECC announced six new local cases, including an elementary school student in Zhongli District, Taoyuan City. Upon learning of the case, the school immediately suspended classes from 10 to 24 January for a period of 14 days, and several other schools followed by implementing precautionary closures.

=== New Taipei City ===
On 5 January, the New Taipei City Government required household members subject to the "10+4+7" quarantine arrangement to undergo government-funded testing on the 14th day. New Taipei Mayor Hou Yu-ih also urged residents not to remove their masks when taking close-up photographs before 17 January in order to prevent breaches in epidemic prevention. On 6 January, the New Taipei City Government released the activity history of Case 17307, which included convenience stores, a post office, and RT-Mart in Yingge District.

=== Taichung City ===
On 27 January (announced on 28 January), Taichung City reported two local cases: a 25-year-old woman from Shalu District (Case 18711, Ct value 16.73), a graduate student and close contact of Case 18613, the "Taoyuan Bade aunt," whose related locations had already been disinfected; and a 21-year-old woman from Beitun District (Case 18748, Ct value 20), who had no activity history in Taichung and had accompanied a patient at a hospital in New Taipei City between 18 and 27 January, where she had contact with another confirmed case on the same floor. Following notification, the city government implemented the following measures:

- Arranged quarantine, PCR testing, epidemiological investigations, and other disease-control measures.
- Conducted comprehensive disinfection of locations visited by the cases.
- Established additional community testing stations at Kuang Tien General Hospital in Shalu and Tungs' Taichung MetroHarbor Hospital from 28 to 30 January.

=== Chiayi City ===
On 18 March, the Chiayi City Government received notification from the Central Epidemic Command Center regarding Case 21792 and immediately implemented the following measures:

- Convened emergency meetings with relevant agencies.
- Arranged quarantine, PCR testing, epidemiological investigations, and related disease-control measures.

=== Chiayi County ===
At 12:30 a.m. on 19 March, the Chiayi County Government received notification from the CECC and immediately initiated the following measures:

- Convened emergency meetings with relevant agencies.
- Arranged quarantine, PCR testing, epidemiological investigations, and related disease-control measures.
- Established testing stations at Xiulin Elementary School in Minxiong Township (afternoon of 19 March), Minxiong Sports Park (afternoon of 19 March and all day on 20 March), Chang Gung Memorial Hospital in Taibao City (afternoon of 19 March and 20–21 March), and Dalin Tzu Chi Hospital in Dalin Township (afternoon of 19 March and 20–21 March).

== Medical response ==
On 5 January, in response to the local cluster outbreak at Taiwan Taoyuan International Airport and imported cases, Chen Shih-chung announced preparations to activate additional medical response capacity. The Taipei City Government also urged frontline healthcare workers to receive booster doses as soon as possible to enhance protection.The Kaohsiung City Government increased the number of designated COVID-19 wards and negative-pressure isolation rooms.On 6 January, the CECC announced that the Taipei and Northern regions would reopen dedicated COVID-19 wards at full capacity, providing 1,453 beds within three days for confirmed patients.

On 7 January, Kaohsiung Mayor Chen Chi-mai announced the first phase of stricter hospital control measures in the city, including postponing non-essential health examinations, limiting the number of visitors and visiting hours, and requiring proof of a negative PCR test before undergoing invasive respiratory procedures.

== Reactions ==
=== Central government ===
On 4 January，Tsai Ing-wen, President of the Republic of China, stated that the emergence of four local cases required caution and heightened vigilance, while urging the public to receive vaccinations as soon as possible. On 5 January, in response to the increase in local cases, Tsai stated that the government would continue to safeguard the epidemic prevention line. On 6 January, she said that border personnel who bore the risk of infection should not be blamed as "breaches" in epidemic prevention. On 7 January, Premier Su Tseng-chang called on the public to comply with epidemic prevention regulations and receive vaccinations in order to increase vaccine coverage following the resurgence of local cases.

=== Local governments ===
Amid concerns over the Taoyuan International Airport cluster, quarantine hotel outbreaks, and the approach of the Lunar New Year, local governments across Taiwan tightened epidemic prevention measures to prevent further spread..

The Taipei City Government inspected ventilation systems at quarantine hotels and ordered facilities unable to meet standards to cease operations. Taipei Mayor Ko Wen-je, however, cautioned against hastily raising the epidemic alert level and stated that although community transmission had occurred, widespread vaccination meant that most people possessed a certain degree of immunity and there was no need for excessive panic.

Taichung Deputy Mayor Chen Tzu-ching led inspections of quarantine hotels, prompting operators to increase the frequency of disinfection. Huang Wei-che, Mayor of Tainan, also urged residents not to remove masks while taking photographs..The Kaohsiung City Government planned to establish quarantine hotels dedicated to isolation purposes and required epidemic prevention personnel at airports, ports, and hotels to receive booster doses as soon as possible. The city's testing measures were stricter than those adopted by the CECC. Quarantine hotel workers who had received their second vaccine dose less than 14 days earlier were required to undergo testing every three days, while household members completing quarantine were provided with rapid test kits for self-testing.

== Vaccination ==
On the afternoon of 4 January, Chen Shih-chung stated that a large number of travelers from high-risk countries would soon be returning to Taiwan and emphasized the need to rapidly increase first- and second-dose vaccination coverage to establish basic protection. On 5 January, he again warned that the epidemic had not yet reached its most severe stage and urged the public to get vaccinated promptly.

As local transmission emerged in Taoyuan City, vaccine reservation numbers in Taipei also increased, leading to queues at vaccination stations. Beginning that day, Taipei City provided NT$200 vouchers to residents receiving their first or second vaccine dose. On 6 January, Cheng Wen-tsan, Mayor of Taoyuan, stated that authorities were considering shortening the interval between vaccine doses for frontline high-risk airport personnel.

== Subsequent Measures Following the Easing of the Outbreak ==
On 24 February, the Taiwan Centers for Disease Control announced several adjustments to epidemic prevention measures.

=== Air and Maritime Transportation ===
Beginning on 1 March, screening stations and health declaration requirements for travel between Taiwan proper and offshore islands were suspended at five airports (Taipei Songshan, Taichung, Chiayi, Tainan, and Kaohsiung) and two ports (Keelung and Kaohsiung).

=== Adjustment of Home Quarantine Periods ===
Starting from 00:00 on 7 March, non-citizen business travelers were once again permitted to enter Taiwan. In addition, the home quarantine period for inbound travelers was reduced to ten days, calculated based on scheduled arrival time, while close contacts of confirmed cases would likewise be required to undergo only ten days of home isolation.

=== Adjustment of Hospital Visitation Policies ===
As the epidemic situation in Taiwan became more stable, hospital visitation policies were revised beginning on 1 March. Hospitals in Taipei, New Taipei City, Taoyuan, and Kaohsiung continued to prohibit visits except under special circumstances, while hospitals in other counties and cities were allowed to reopen visitation services under certain conditions.

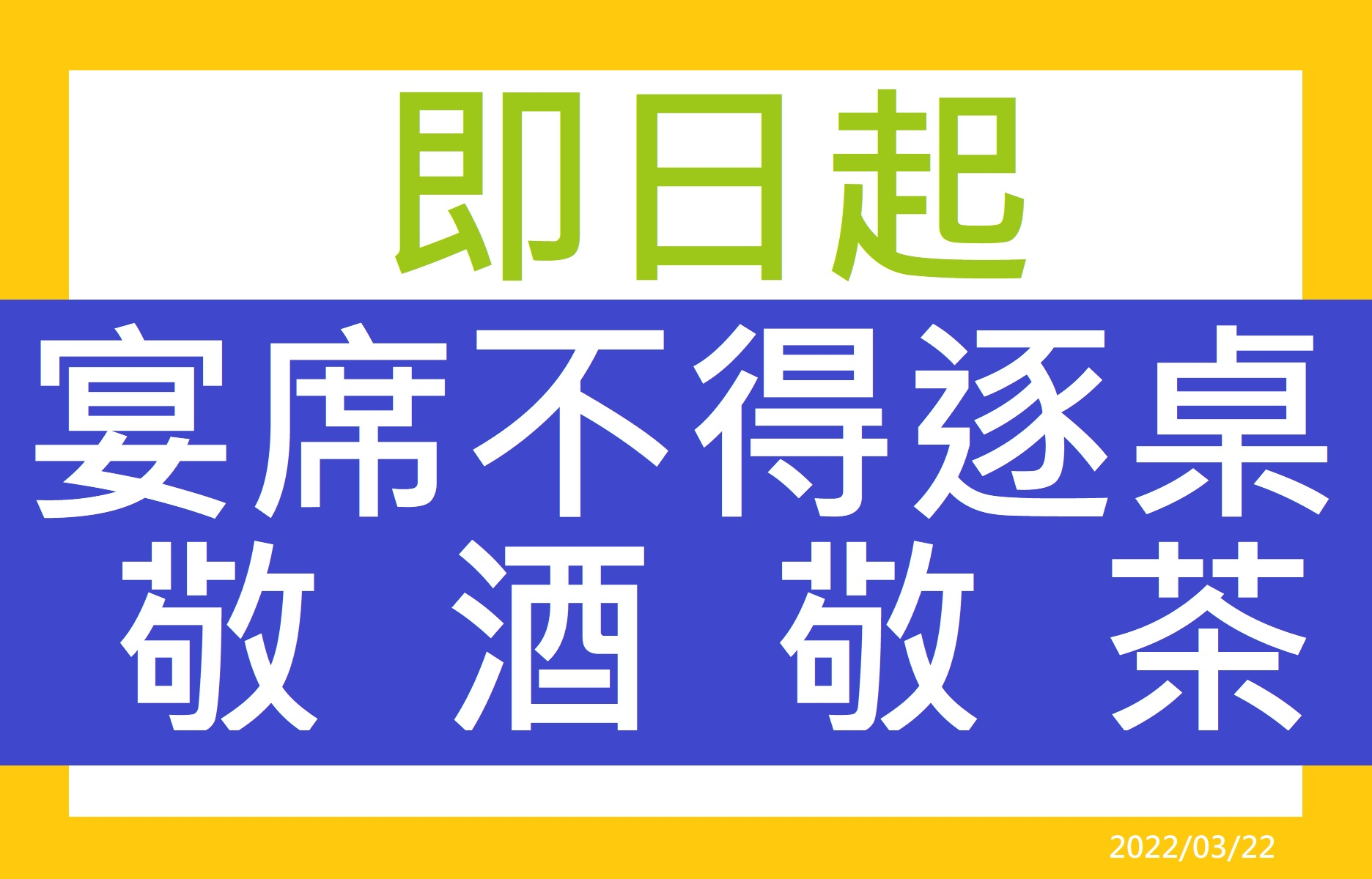
March 22, 2022 (Effective immediately, table-to-table toasts or tea-serving is prohibited at banquets.)

=== Partial Relaxation of Epidemic Prevention Measures ===
In view of the stable epidemic situation as of 24 February, several restrictions were eased between 1 and 31 March in order to maintain epidemic prevention capacity while allowing socioeconomic activities to resume.

Mask regulations were relaxed with several exceptions. Masks remained mandatory when singing. Individuals were permitted to remove masks while engaging in indoor or outdoor exercise, taking personal or group photographs, driving alone or with household members, participating in formal filming or speaking engagements such as broadcasts, lectures, and speeches, performing agricultural, forestry, fishery, and animal husbandry work in open areas, engaging in activities in mountains and coastal areas, or using hot springs, saunas, spas, steam rooms, and participating in water activities where masks could become wet. Masks could also be removed temporarily while eating and drinking, or when participating in designated events that complied with relevant epidemic prevention measures.

Public venues and transportation facilities were still required to implement contact tracing registration, temperature screening, environmental disinfection, employee health management, and immediate response mechanisms for confirmed cases.

Hypermarkets, supermarkets, and traditional markets no longer faced crowd-control requirements and resumed food tasting services.

Eating and drinking were again permitted aboard Taiwan High Speed Rail, Taiwan Railway, highway buses, ferries (except outside designated dining areas), and domestic flights.

Restaurants were required to continue implementing contact tracing registration, temperature checks, and sanitation measures. Banquet guests were initially allowed to offer table-to-table toasts and tea, but following transmission linked to banquet events involving Cases 21792 and 22137, Chen Shih-chung, Minister of Health and Welfare, announced on 22 March that table-to-table toasting and tea-serving at banquets would again be prohibited. Restaurants violating epidemic prevention regulations would face penalties and could be prohibited from offering dine-in services until improvements were completed.

Religious venues and gatherings were required to comply with epidemic prevention regulations issued by the Ministry of the Interior.

=== Revision of Epidemic Prevention Measures for Taiwanese Flight Crews ===
On 2 March, the Taiwan Centers for Disease Control announced revised measures for Taiwanese airline crews, which took effect on 7 March and were calculated according to the scheduled arrival time of flights.

For crews arriving from Level 3 epidemic-risk areas (long-haul flights):

- Crew members who had received a booster dose at least 14 days earlier had their requirement reduced from five days of home quarantine with a PCR test on Day 5 to five days of self-health management, with a rapid test on Day 7 and a PCR test on Day 10.
- Those who had not received a booster dose, or had received one less than 14 days previously, remained subject to five days of home quarantine with a PCR test on Day 5, followed by nine days of enhanced self-health management with PCR tests on Days 9 and 14.
- Crew members whose residences met the "one person per household" requirement could continue quarantine at home after receiving a PCR test arranged by their airline upon arrival.

For crews operating same-day round trips without entering Level 3 epidemic-risk areas (short-haul flights):

- Crew members who had received a booster dose at least 14 days earlier were subject to seven days of self-health monitoring and PCR testing every seven days, with one rapid test performed between PCR tests at an interval of three to four days.
- Those who had not received a booster dose, or had received one less than 14 days previously, remained subject to seven days of self-health management and PCR testing every seven days.
