= Taipei Medical University Hospital =

Hospital in Xinyi, Taipei, Taiwan

Taipei Medical University Hospital 臺北醫學大學附設醫院
- TMU Healthcare System
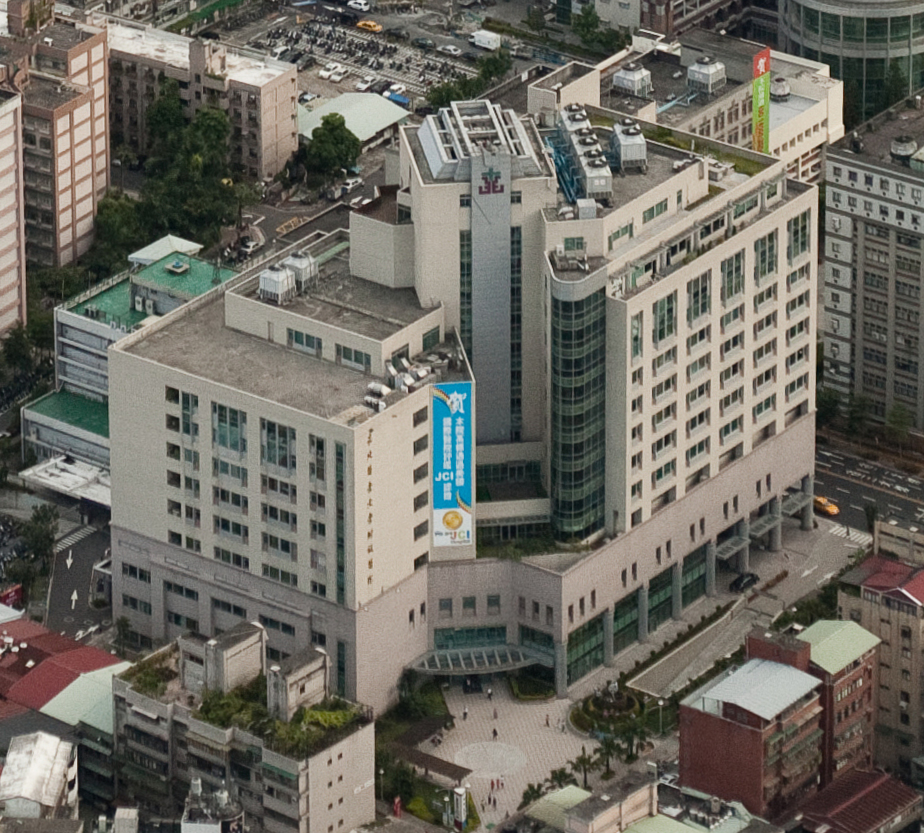

Geography
- Location: Xinyi, Taipei, Taiwan
- Coordinates: 25°01′37.2″N 121°33′47.2″E

Organisation
- Care system: Taiwan National Health Insurance
- Type: Teaching hospital
- Affiliated university: Taipei Medical University

Services
- Standards: Joint Commission
- Beds: 946

History
- Opened: 1976

Links
- Website: www.tmuh.org.tw

Taipei Medical University Hospital (TMUH; Chinese: 臺北醫學大學附設醫院) is a healthcare facility in Taipei, Taiwan established in 1976.

== Reproductive Center－In Vitro Fertilization (IVF) ==
The Center for Reproductive Medicine at Taipei Medical University Hospital was established in 1991 and is headed by Professor Chii-Ruey Tzeng. The Hospital's advanced reproductive technology has assisted more than 20,000 infertile couples. The center has achieved several medical milestones in reproductive technology, including the birth of the hospital's first test-tube baby in 1991 and the country's first application of Microsurgical Epididymal Sperm Aspiration (MESA) in 1993. In 1995, the first baby using Intracytoplasmic sperm injection was born in the hospital, followed by the successful pregnancy from a thawed frozen embryo in 1996.

In 2001, the center successfully performed autologous mitochondrial transfer.

== Taipei Cancer Center ==
The Taipei Cancer Center was established in October 2020.

=== Health Management Center ===
Health management services available in center include:

- Health screening
- Professional services
- Medical equipment
- Accommodation
- Health examination services

== See also ==
- List of hospitals in Taiwan
- Taipei Medical University
