= Taipei Medical University Shuang-Ho Hospital =

Hospital in Zhonghe, New Taipei, Taiwan

Taipei Medical University Shuang-Ho Hospital 雙和醫院
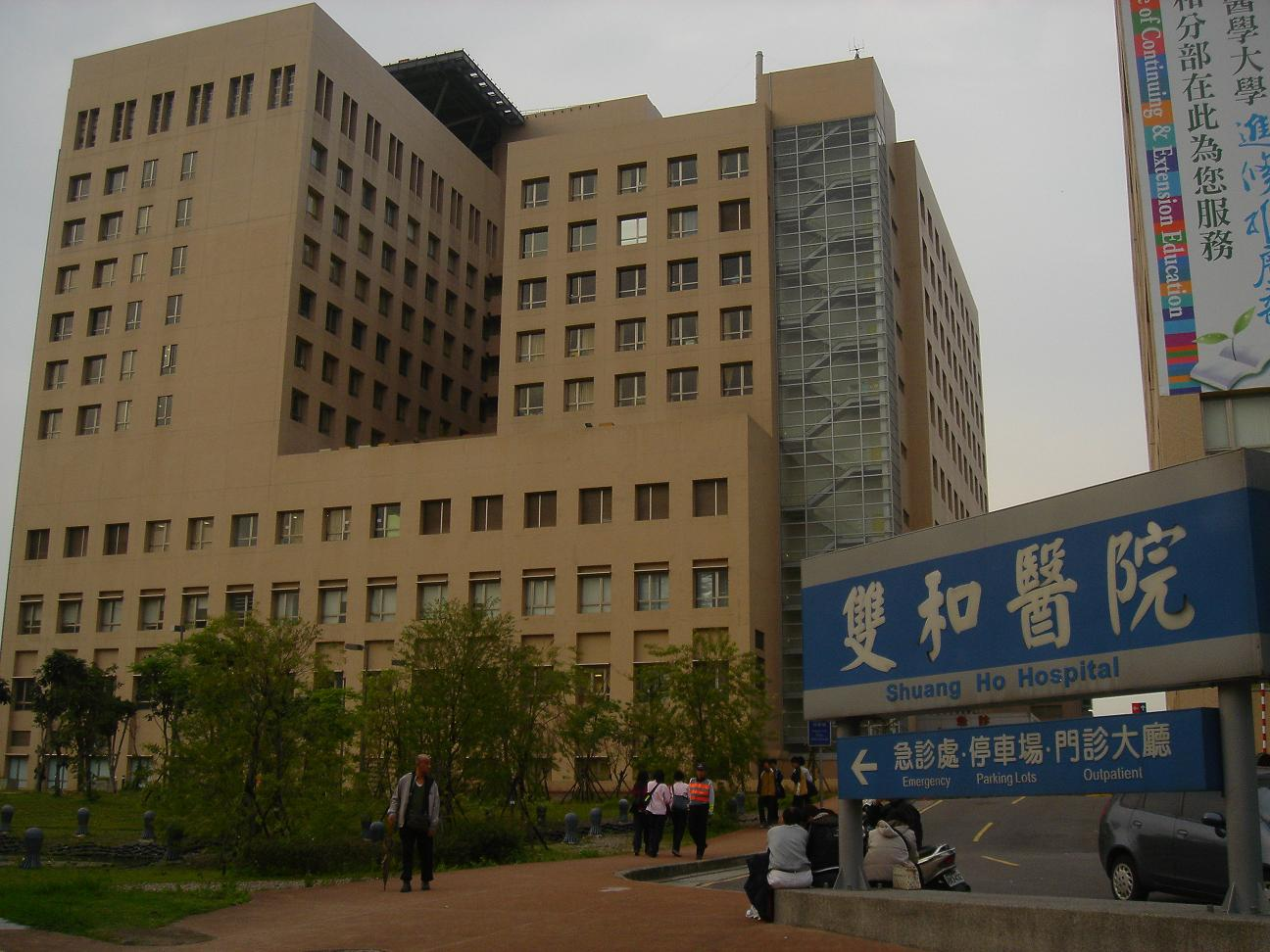

Geography
- Location: Zhonghe, New Taipei, Taiwan
- Coordinates: 24°59′33.2″N 121°29′37.5″E

Organisation
- Type: hospital
- Affiliated university: Taipei Medical University

Services
- Beds: 1,500

History
- Opened: 1 July 2008

Links
- Website: Official website

The Taipei Medical University Shuang-Ho Hospital (traditional Chinese: 雙和醫院; simplified Chinese: 双和医院; pinyin: Shuānghé Yīyuàn; Pe̍h-ōe-jī: Siang-hô I-īⁿ) is a hospital in Zhonghe District, New Taipei, Taiwan. It is the affiliated hospital of Taipei Medical University.

== History ==
The hospital was opened on 1 July 2008. It was accredited by Joint Commission International in 2009 and reaccredited in 2012 and 2015. The Ministry of Health and Welfare upgraded Shuang-Ho Hospital to the status of a medical center in 2024.

== Departments ==
- Internal medicine
- Surgery
- Geriatrics and gerontology
- Obstetrics and gynecology/pediatrics
- Dentistry
- Others

== Capacity ==
The hospital has a capacity of 1,500 beds.

== Transportation ==
The hospital is accessible within walking distance west of Jingan Station of Taipei Metro.

== See also ==
- List of hospitals in Taiwan
