= Chuang Jen-hsiang =

Taiwanese physician-scientist and bioinformatician (born 1966)

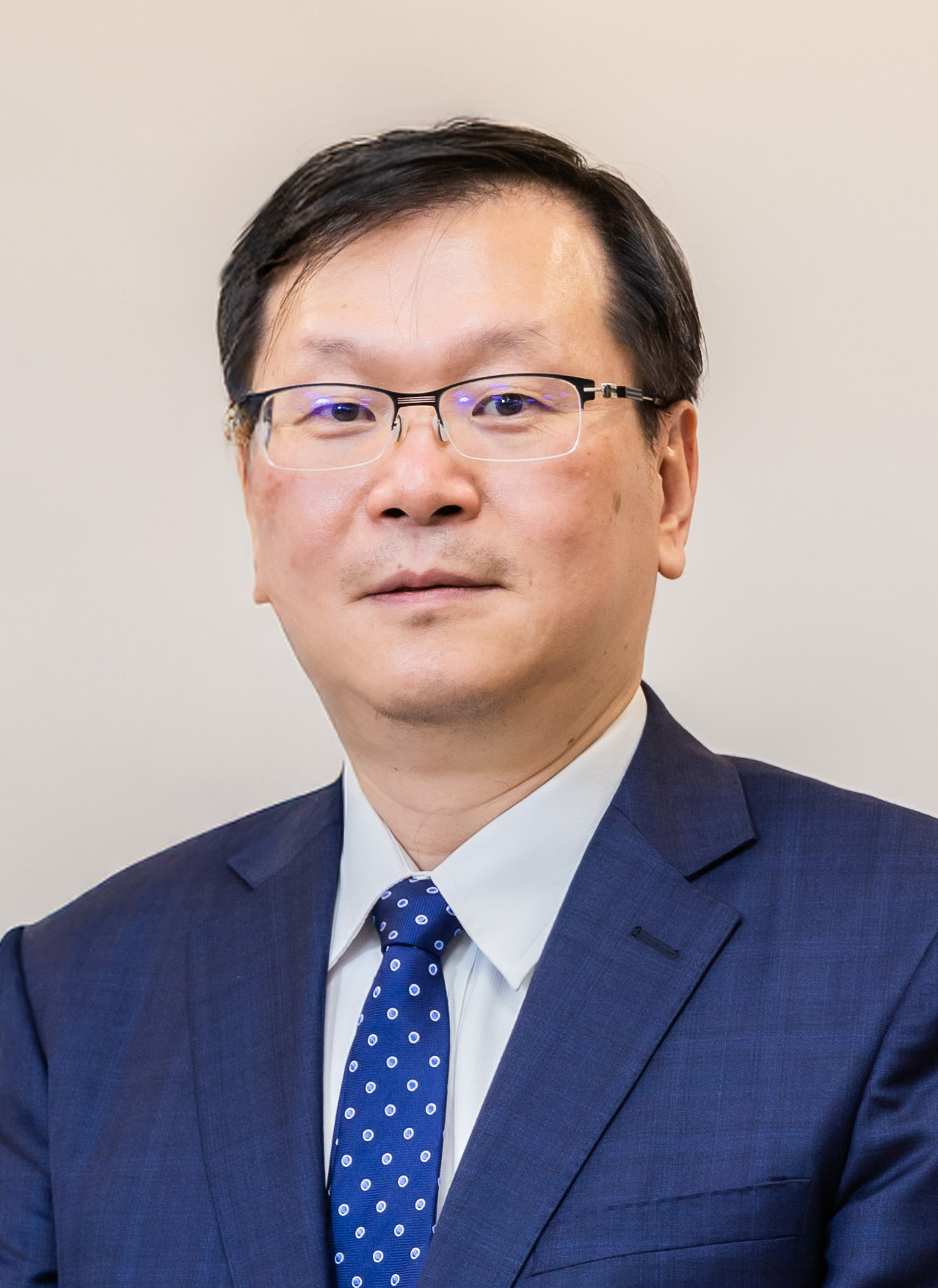
- Official portrait, 2025

Vice Minister of the Ministry of Health and Welfare
- Incumbent
- Assumed office September 1, 2025
- Preceded by: Chou Jih-haw

Personal details
- Born: May 18, 1966 (age 60) Lukang, Taiwan
- Education: National Yang-Ming University (MD, MS); Columbia University (MPhil, PhD)

Chuang Jen-hsiang (Chinese: 莊人祥; pinyin: Zhuāng Rénxiáng; born May 18, 1966) is a Taiwanese physician-scientist and bioinformatician who has been the vice minister of the Ministry of Health and Welfare since 2025.

== Early life and education ==
Chuang was born on May 18, 1966, in Lukang, Taiwan. After graduating from Taipei Municipal Chien Kuo High School, he received a government scholarship to study medicine at National Yang-Ming University, where he earned his Doctor of Medicine (M.D.) in 1992 and a Master of Science (M.S.) in public health in 1994. As a medical student, he interned at Taichung Veterans General Hospital.

Chuang completed graduate studies in the U.S., earning an M.Phil. in medical informatics in 2000 and his Ph.D. in biomedical informatics in 2003, both from Columbia University. His doctoral dissertation, completed under professors George Hripcsak and Carol Friedman, was titled, "Automated abstraction of medical records for assessing patient outcomes".

== Medical career ==
Chuang was a lecturer of social medicine at National Yang-Ming University from 1994 to 2003. After receiving his doctorate, he was a joint associate professor of public health, social medicine, and bioinformatics at the university from 2003 to 2005.

In February 2005, Chuang joined the Taiwan Centers for Disease Control (CDC) as its deputy director of national health. He was an associate researcher at the CDC from 2005 to 2013 and became its deputy director-general in July 2013. On February 22, 2023, Chuang was appointed as the agency's director-general, succeeding Chou Jih-haw.

In September 2025, Chuang was appointed vice minister of the Ministry of Health and Welfare.

== Selected publications ==
- Chien, Yu-San; Su, Chia-Ping; Tsai, Huai-Te; Huang, Angela S.; Lien, Chia-En; Hung, Min-Nan; Chuang, Jen-Hsiang; Kuo, Hsu-Sung; Chang, Shan-Chwen (February 1, 2010). "Predictors and outcomes of respiratory failure among hospitalized pneumonia patients with 2009 H1N1 influenza in Taiwan". Journal of Infection. 60 (2): 168–174. doi:10.1016/j.jinf.2009.12.012. ISSN 0163-4453. PMID 20036689.
- Chen, Wan-Chin; Huang, Angela S.; Chuang, Jen-Hsiang; Chiu, Chen-Chung; Kuo, Hsu-Sung (March 2011). "Social and economic impact of school closure resulting from pandemic influenza A/H1N1". Journal of Infection. 62 (3): 200–203. doi:10.1016/j.jinf.2011.01.007.
- Wei, Sung-Hsi; Yang, Ji-Rong; Wu, Ho-Sheng; Chang, Ming-Chuan; Lin, Jen-Shiou; Lin, Chi-Yung; Liu, Yu-Lun; Lo, Yi-Chun; Yang, Chin-Hui; Chuang, Jen-Hsiang; Lin, Min-Cheng; Chung, Wen-Chen; Liao, Chia-Hung; Lee, Min-Shiuh; Huang, Wan-Ting (December 2013). "Human infection with avian influenza A H6N1 virus: an epidemiological analysis". The Lancet. 1 (10): 771–778. doi:10.1016/S2213-2600(13)70221-2. PMC 7164810. PMID 24461756.
- Iuliano, A Danielle; Roguski, Katherine M; Chang, Howard H; Muscatello, David J; Palekar, Rakhee; Tempia, Stefano; Cohen, Cheryl; Gran, Jon Michael; Schanzer, Dena; Cowling, Benjamin J; Wu, Peng; Kyncl, Jan; Ang, Li Wei; Park, Minah; Redlberger-Fritz, Monika (March 2018). "Estimates of global seasonal influenza-associated respiratory mortality: a modelling study". The Lancet. 391 (10127): 1285–1300. doi:10.1016/S0140-6736(17)33293-2. PMC 5935243. PMID 29248255.
