= Taipei Medical University =

University in Taiwan

- 臺北醫學大學
- Former names: Taipei Medical College (1960–2000)
- Motto: 誠樸
- Motto in English: Honesty
- Type: Private
- Established: 1960 (as Taipei Medical College); 2000 (as Taipei Medical University)
- Affiliations: U12 Consortium; University System of Taipei
- President: Chien-Huang Lin
- Students: 6,112
- Undergraduates: 4,749
- Postgraduates: 1,333
- Location: Xinyi, Taipei, Taiwan; 25.025°N 121.561°E
- Colours: Maroon
- Website: www.tmu.edu.tw

Taipei Medical University
- Traditional Chinese: 臺北醫學大學
- Simplified Chinese: 台北医学大学
Transcriptions
Standard Mandarin
- Hanyu Pinyin: Táiběi Yīxué Dàxué
- Wade–Giles: T'ai-pei I-hsüeh Ta-hsüeh
Yue: Cantonese
- Yale Romanization: Tai2 bei3 Yi1 swye2 Da4 swye2
- Jyutping: Toi4 bak1 Ji1 hok6 Daai6 hok6
Southern Min
- Hokkien POJ: Tâi-pak I-ha̍k Tāi-ha̍k

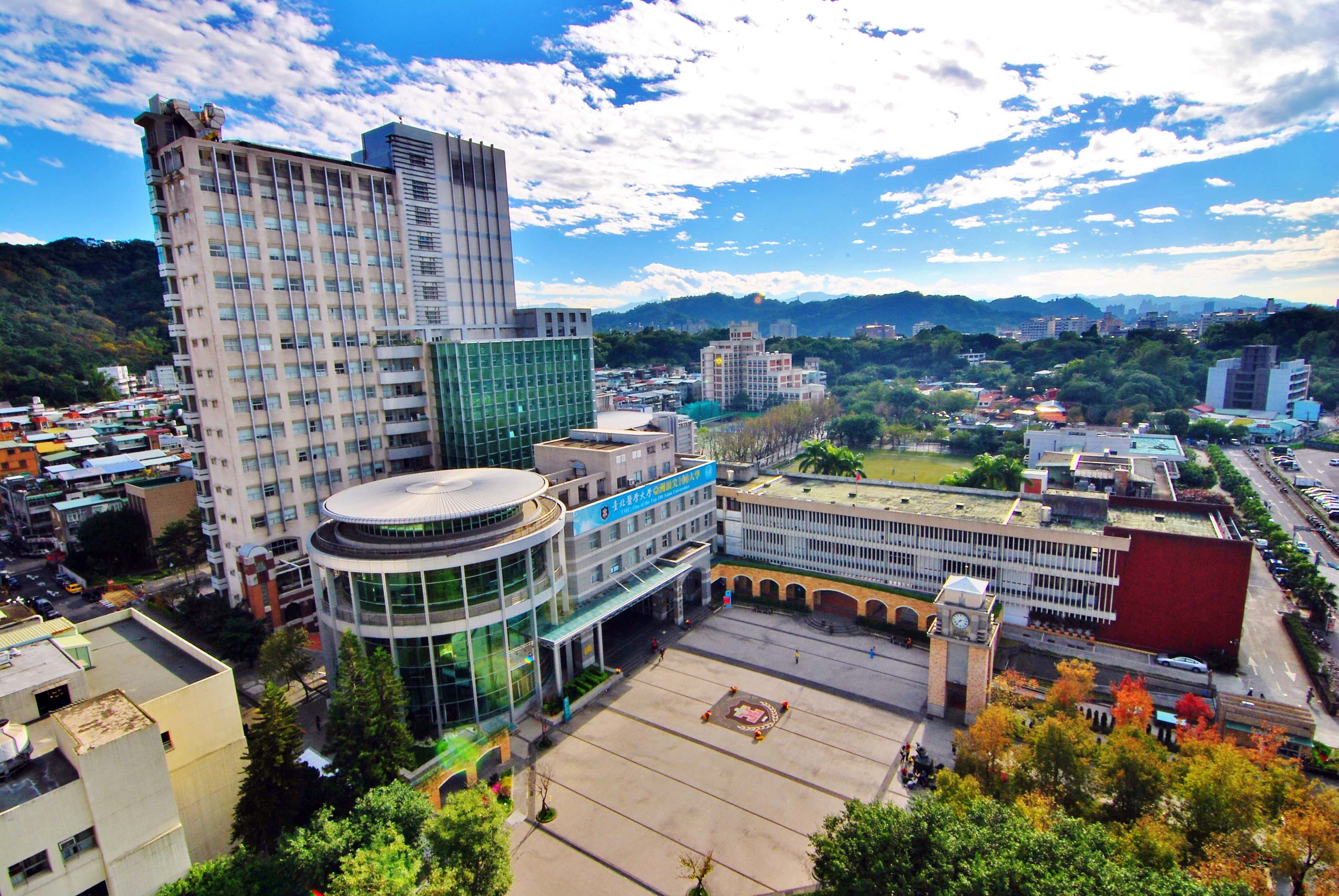
Taipei Medical University

Taipei Medical University (TMU; Chinese: 臺北醫學大學; pinyin: Táiběi Yīxué Dàxué; Pe̍h-ōe-jī: Tâi-pak I-ha̍k Tāi-ha̍k) is a private medical school in Xinyi District, Taipei, Taiwan. Founded as Taipei Medical College in 1960, it assumed its current name in 2000.

The university is organized into ten colleges and five teaching hospitals, including Taipei Medical University Hospital and Shuang-Ho Hospital. It hosts MB, MD, PhD, and master's programs, enrolling more than 4,000 undergraduates and 1,000 postgraduates.

== History ==
Dr. Shui-Wang Hu and Dr. Chien-Tien Hsu founded Taipei Medical College on June 1, 1960. The college started as three buildings. Dr. Shui-Wang Hu and Dr. Chien-Tien Hsu, together with other medical professionals and educators, ran the school, using their own personal books as textbooks. With the help of private donations, the school flourished.

In 2000, the school was renamed Taipei Medical University.

== Academics ==
TMU is composed of eleven colleges and one center:

- College of Medicine
- College of Oral Medicine
- College of Pharmacy
- College of Nursing
- College of Public Health
- College of Medical Science and Technology
- College of Humanity and Social Science
- Biomedical Engineering
- College of Management
- College of Nutrition
- College of Interdisciplinary Studies
- Center of General Education

There are three affiliated hospitals throughout southern Taipei.

The university also has 12 undergraduate schools and 14 graduate institutes.

Area of study	Undergraduate (<2 years)	Undergraduate Associates (2 years)	Undergraduate Bachelor's (3–5 years)	Master's Degree	Doctoral Degree
Humanities and Sciences				Yes	
Engineering	Yes		Yes	Yes	
Medicine and Health	Yes	Yes	Yes	Yes	Yes
Science and Technology	Yes		Yes	Yes	Yes

=== Research ===
TMU research focuses on traumatic brain injury, regenerative medicine, cancer, reproductive medicine, biomedical materials, and dental research. The annual funding TMU receives for research exceeds NT$600 million. In 2009, a Ministry of Education incentive program promoting university-industry cooperation selected the university to receive more than NT$50 million in grants over three years.

== Campus ==
Taipei Medical University is located on Wuxing Street, a few blocks away from one of the tallest buildings in the world, Taipei 101. The campus is made up of 10 school buildings, each equipped with instructional rooms as well as research facilities. Adjacent to the campus is the Taipei Medical University Hospital, one of the university's three affiliated hospitals. The TMU website provides an online campus map.

Taipei Medical University

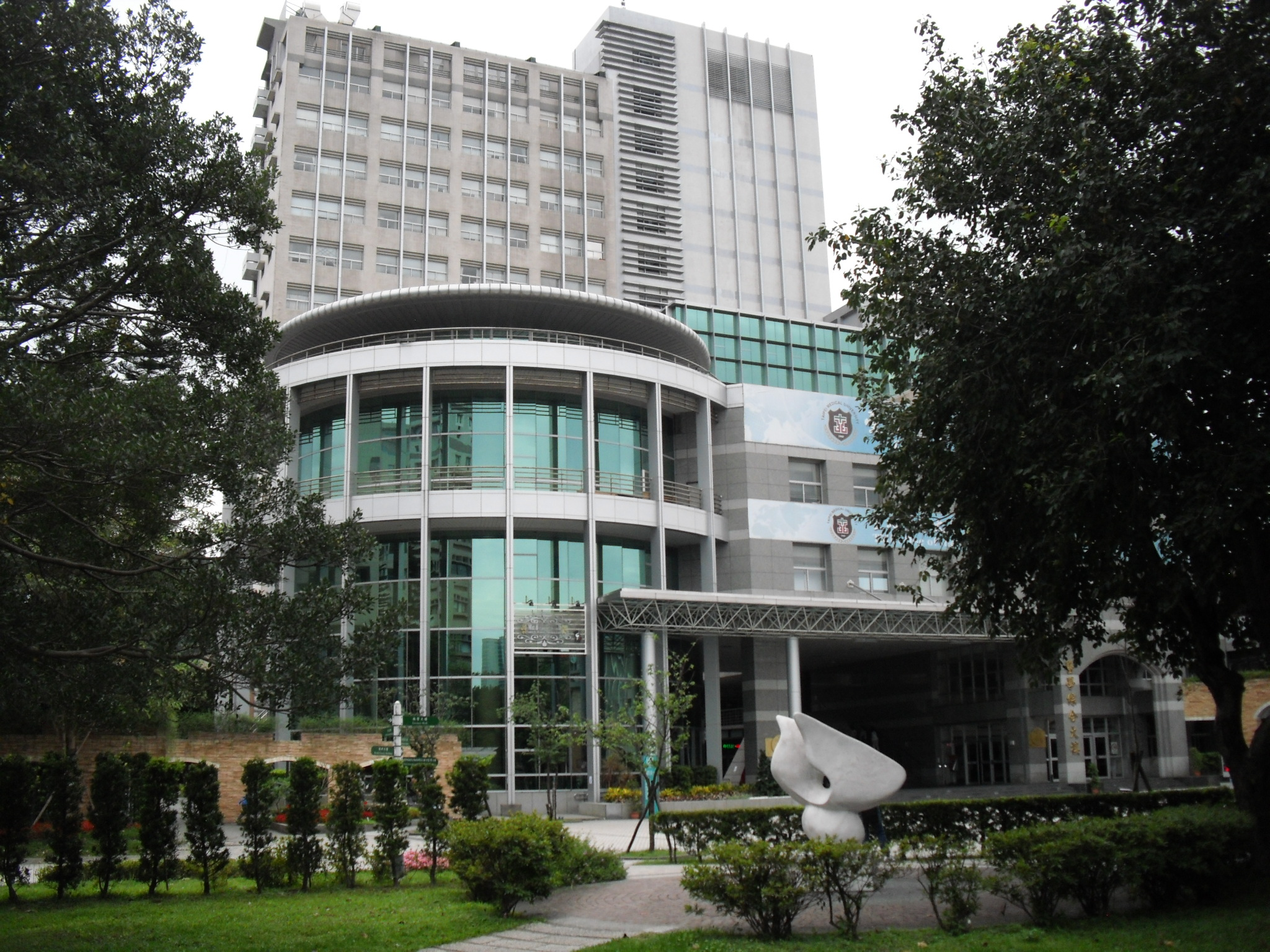

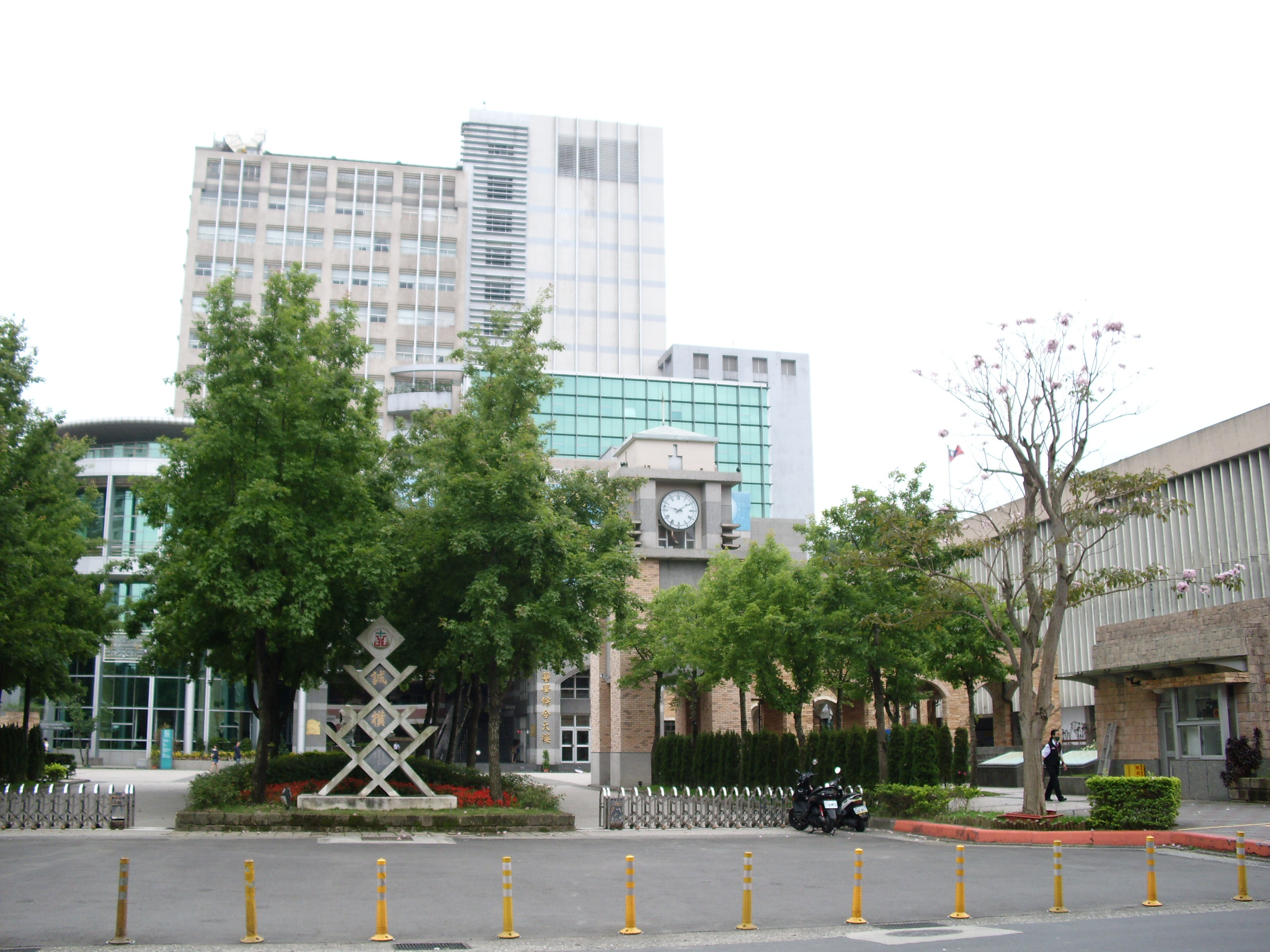

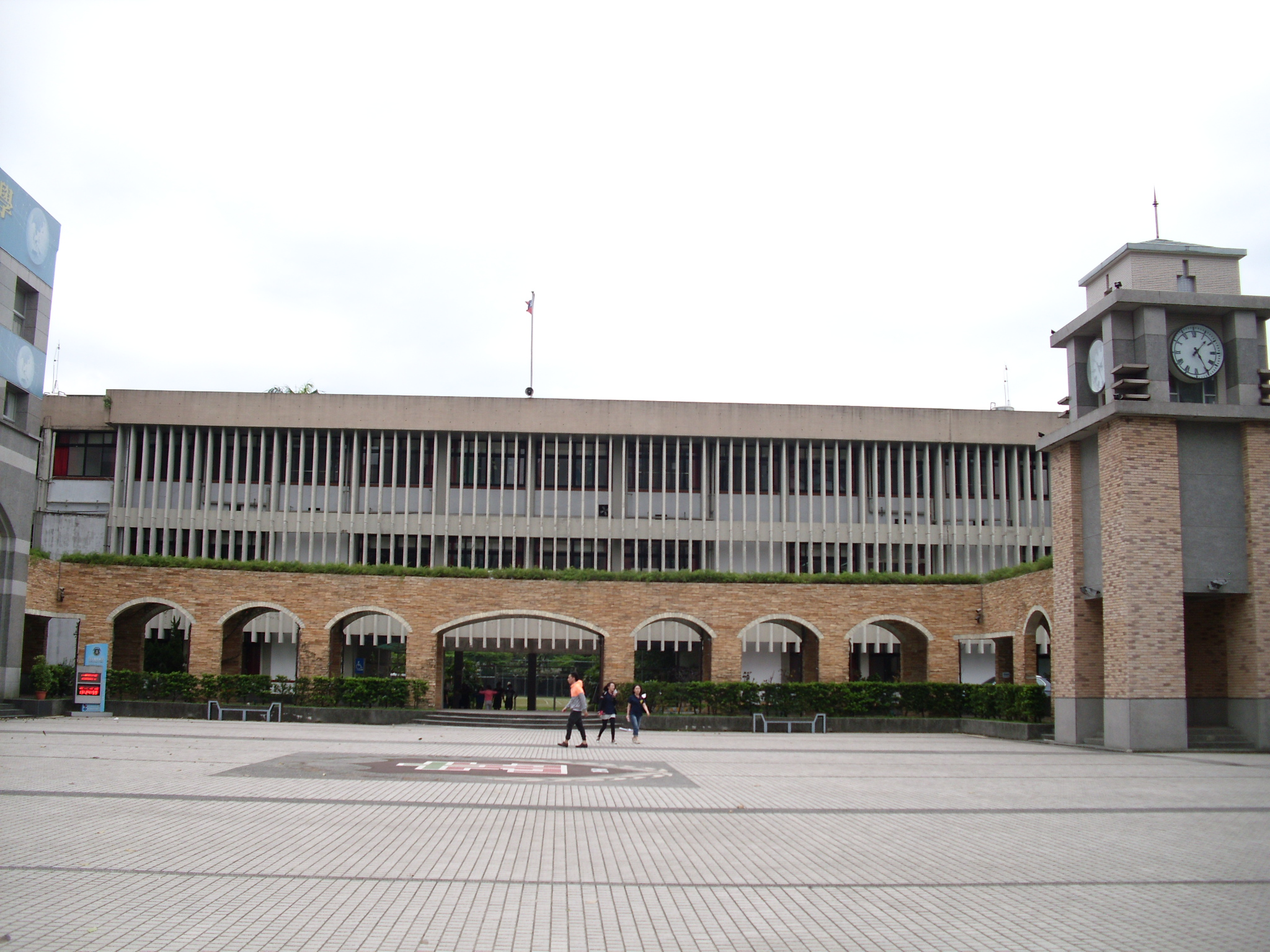

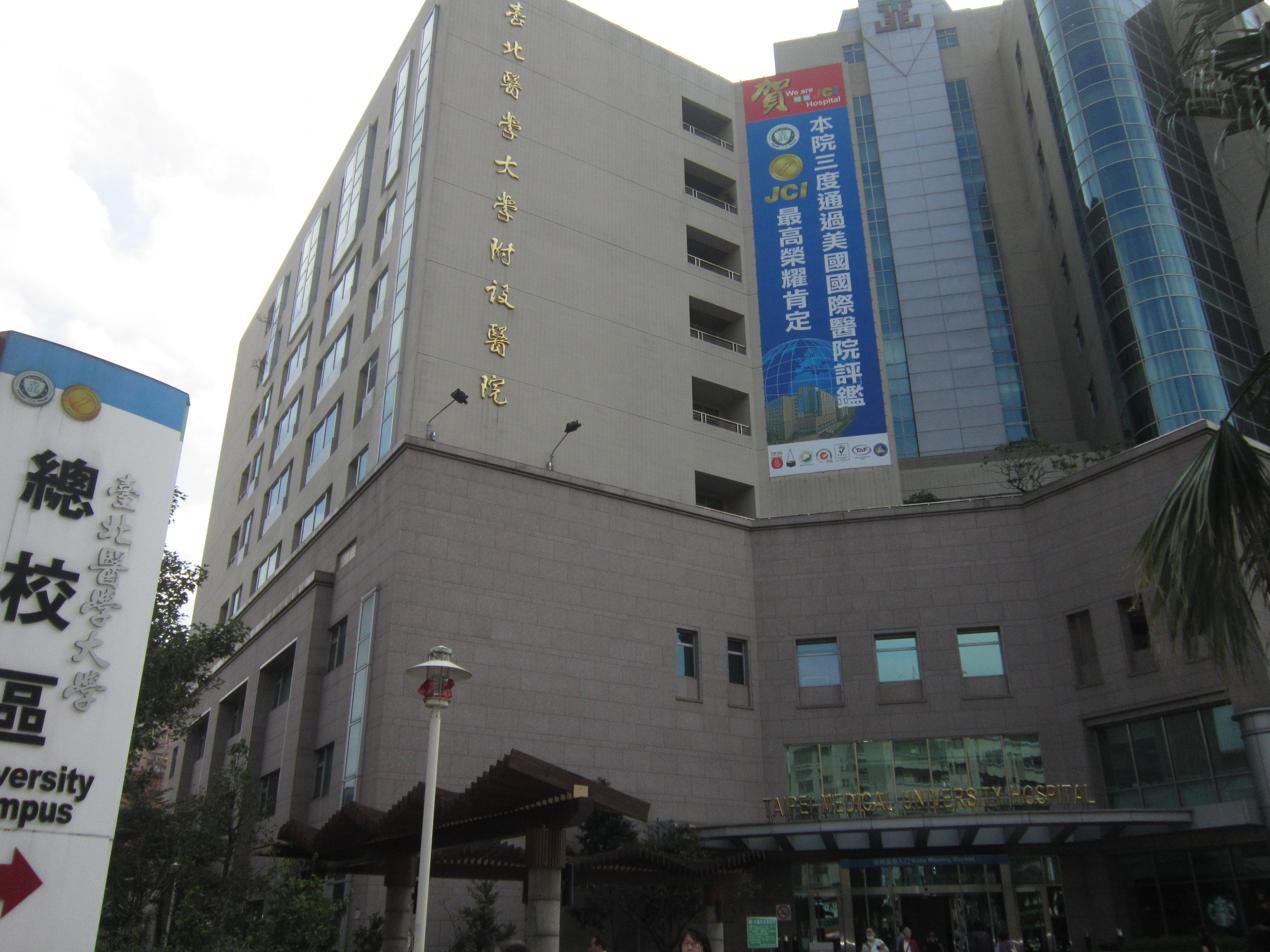

=== Transportation ===
The hospital runs a free shuttle bus to and from the Taipei City Hall MRT stop every 15 minutes. There is also a shuttle bus to and from the Liuzhangli MRT station, running every half hour. Other public transport to TMU are the public buses that stop near the university.

=== Green University ===
The university turned to international environmental diplomacy scholars, the former Director of Environmental Protection, Professor Chen Zhongxin, now the Chair Professor of International Health at Taipei Medical University. He and ten other environmental health professors help the university participate in carbon reduction as well as sustainable management. Taipei Medical University received the Taipei City "Green Procurement" and the Ministry of the Interior's "Green Building Award".

=== Attractions ===
Located within a ten-minute bus ride from the university are some of Taipei's cultural centers. Taipei City Hall and Taipei 101 are down the street from the MRT station. A little further and there is Taipei World Trade Center. Sun Yat-sen Memorial Hall is also located near Taipei 101. Close by are shopping centers as well as a Warner Village Cinema and an ESLite.

== Student life ==
=== Residential life ===
There is one dormitory on campus and three international dormitories off campus, all within walking distance or reachable by bus. The Liuzhangli dormitories feature furnished, 2-bed rooms. The Wuxing Street dorms are available on four floors. All rooms are furnished. It is located near a traditional market and convenience store. The last dorm, located on Fuyang Street, is on the fourth and fifth floor of an apartment building, located near the Liuzhangli MRT station.

=== Dining ===
The university offers a food court in the basement of the United Medical Building. In the center of campus is a 7-Eleven as well as a French-Italian restaurant called Mr. J. The hospital contains a cafeteria that makes MSG-free food. In the streets near the campus are small restaurants, shops, and vendors for a quick meal or a sit-down meal.

=== Library ===
The library, located in the United Medical Building's second to fourth floor, contains 150,000 volumes as well as DVDs and movies. Printed and electronic books are available in Chinese, English, Japanese, and other languages. There are spaces for students to study or to hang out with friends.

=== Clubs and facilities ===
TMU contains a computer lab, meeting rooms, and offices for its 80 student clubs.

Sports facilities include an indoor pool, aerobics room, gym, baseball field, basketball court, and tennis courts.

== International missions ==
Taipei Medical University is involved in the International Cooperation and Development Fund. It helps organize and manage the medical mission to São Tomé and Príncipe, a Western Africa island. The project develops diplomatic relationships for the government of Taiwan. TMU sends medical personnel to the area, and provides medical services to its citizens, screens for parasites, and investigates water quality.

== Affiliated hospitals ==
TMU has three affiliated hospitals, all located within Taipei.

Taipei Medical University Hospital, established in 1976, is the oldest of TMU's three affiliated hospitals. It is located next to the university and is composed of three buildings. The hospital researches In vitro fertilisation (IVF) as well as minimally invasive surgery.

Wan Fang Medical Center is the first privately owned and publicly run hospital in Taipei. It is located in the Wenshan District of Taipei, near its own MRT station. Some of its departments are the Cyberknife, reproductive medicine center, stem cell research, and joint replacement center.

Shuang-Ho Hospital is the newest of the three, opened in 2008. It is the largest hospital in New Taipei City. The hospital has a helicopter landing pad, allowing for 24-hour air emergency medical services to patients throughout Taiwan and to Taiwan's offshore islands. The hospital has the only Disabled Patient Oral Health Care Center in Taipei.

== Awards and accreditations ==
Taipei Medical University has earned the National Quality Award and has been accredited by the World Health Organization as an International Safe School. The school is listed as one of the top 100 medical universities in QS Asia University Rankings 2011. All three of its affiliated hospitals have earned Joint Commission International status.

University rankings

Global – Overall
- QS World: =597 (2026)

Regional – Overall
- QS Asia: 122

- Organization Award, 20th Taiwan's National Quality Award (2010)
- Accredited as an International Safe School (ISS) by the World Health Organization
- Certified by the British Standards Institution for global development in sustainability at the international level (GRI G3) and AA 1000 AS certification
- Accredited by Joint Commission International (JCI) for three affiliated hospitals: TMU Hospital, TMU-Wan Fang Hospital and TMU-Shuang Ho Hospital
- Accredited by ISO 9001:2008 (Quality Management), ISO 14001:2004 (Environmental Management), OHSAS 18001:2007 (Vocational Safety & Hygiene), ISO 27001:2005 (International Information Safety), ISO 14064:2006 (Green House Gas, GHG)

== Sister schools ==
Taipei Medical University has 105 international sister schools.

=== Africa ===
- Gambia：University of the Gambia
- Kenya：Great Lakes University of Kisumu
- Eswatini：University of Swaziland
- Eswatini：Nazarene College of Nursing

=== North America ===
- United States：University of Missouri-Kansas City
- United States：Loma Linda University
- United States：University of California, San Francisco
- United States：University of Washington
- United States：University of Texas Health Science Center at Houston
- United States：University of California, Los Angeles
- United States：Ohio State University College of Pharmacy
- United States：University of California, Irvine
- United States：California State University, Fullerton
- United States：AHMC Healthcare
- United States：American College of Acupuncture & Oriental Medicine
- United States：Tufts University
- United States：Palm Beach Atlantic University
- United States：Southern New Hampshire University
- United States：Tulane University
- United States：University of Pennsylvania
- United States：University of Mississippi Medical Center
- United States：Louisiana College
- United States：Jamestown College
- United States：Ohio State University
- United States：University of Pittsburgh
- United States：Virginia Commonwealth University
- United States：Southern California University of Health Sciences
- United States：University of Southern California
- United States：University of California, San Diego
- United States：University of Kansas Medical Center
- United States：Florida International University
- United States：Park University

=== Latin America and the Caribbean ===
- Antigua and Barbuda：University of Health Sciences Antigua
- Paraguay: Universidad Nacional de Asunción
- Guatemala：Universidad Francisco Marroquin

=== Asia ===
- Japan：Nihon University
- Japan：Tokyo Medical and Dental University
- Japan：Health Sciences University of Hokkaido
- Japan：Hiroshima University
- Japan：Tohoku Fukushi University
- Japan：Tohoku University
- Japan：University of Occupational and Environmental Health
- Japan：Tokyo Dental College
- Japan：Showa University
- Japan：Juntendo University
- Japan：Japanese Red Cross Tohoku College of Nursing
- Japan：University of Tokyo
- Japan：Osaka Dental University
- Japan：Osaka City University
- Japan：National Cancer Center Research Institute
- Japan：Teikyo University
- Japan：Yokohama International School
- Japan：Tokushima Bunri University
- Japan：Okinawa Prefectural Care University
- Hong Kong：University of Hong Kong
- Hong Kong：The Chinese University of Hong Kong
- China：Tsinghua University
- China：Peking University Health Science Center
- China：Peking Union Medical College
- China：Fujian Medical University
- China：Anhui Medical University
- China：Shanghai Jiaotong University
- China：Hangzhou Normal University
- China：Zibo Vocational Institute
- China：Zhejiang University
- Singapore：National University of Singapore
- Malaysia：University of Malaya
- Republic of Korea：Konkuk University
- Republic of Korea：Seoul National University
- Republic of Korea：International Cyber University
- Republic of Korea：Central University
- India：India's National Institute of Mental and Nervous Medical Center
- Indonesia：Gadjah Mada University
- Indonesia：Pelita Harapan University
- Kazakhstan：Kazakhstan School of Public Health
- Kyrgyzstan：International University of Central Asia
- Mongolia：Health Sciences University of Mongolia
- Mongolia：National University of Mongolia
- Mongolia：Mongolian University of Science and Technology
- Thailand：Mahidol University
- Turkey：Hatay Mustafa Kemal University

=== Europe ===
- Czech Republic：Palacký University Olomouc
- Czech Republic：Charles University
- France：EHESP
- Germany：Charité, Medical University Berlin
- Germany：Dresden University of Technology
- Greece：University of Western Macedonia
- Hungary：University of Debrecen
- Hungary：Semmelweis University
- Italy：University of Florence
- Italy：University of Bologna
- Poland：Medical University of Lublin
- Romania：Bogdan Voda University
- Romania：Lucian Blaga University of Sibiu
- Spain：Polytechnic University of Valencia
- United Kingdom：Birmingham City University
- United Kingdom：Imperial College London
- United Kingdom：University of Dundee

=== Oceania ===
- Australia：University of Melbourne
- Australia：Griffith University
- Australia：University of Wollongong

== Notable alumni ==
- Chen Shih-chung, Minister of Health and Welfare
- Hsueh Jui-yuan, Vice Minister of Health and Welfare
- Lin Tzou-yien, Minister of Health and Welfare (2016-2017)
- Winston Dang, Minister of Environmental Protection Administration (2007-2008)
- Yang Sui-sheng, Magistrate of Lienchiang County (2009-2014)
- Jen-Tien Wung, anesthesiologist/neonatologist, professor at Columbia University, and developer of Bubble CPAP

== See also ==
- List of universities in Taiwan
- Taipei Medical University Hospital
- U12 Consortium
