= Jen-Tien Wung =

Taiwanese-American pediatrician

Jen-Tien Wung is a Taiwanese-American pediatrician (neonatologist, anesthesiologist), author and professor of pediatrics at Columbia University's New York Presbyterian Hospital who developed Bubble CPAP for the treatment of premature babies.

Wung graduated from Taipei Medical College in Taiwan in 1966. He then moved to New York City in the United States where he completed residencies in Obstetrics-Gynecology and Anesthesiology at Bronx-Lebanon Hospital Center and Columbia Presbyterian Medical Center in New York City in 1971. He then completed a combined fellowship in pediatrics and neonatal intensive care medicine at New York Presbyterian Hospital in 1974, and then continued to work at Columbia as an attending physician and professor. In the mid-1970s "Dr. Jen-Tien Wung at Columbia University, New York developed the bubble CPAP system using short nasal prongs and his unit was well known for many decades for his extraordinary results with CPAP." Wung has authored at least fifty published articles and books.
