= Hsueh Jui-yuan =

Taiwanese physician and lawyer

- 薛瑞元
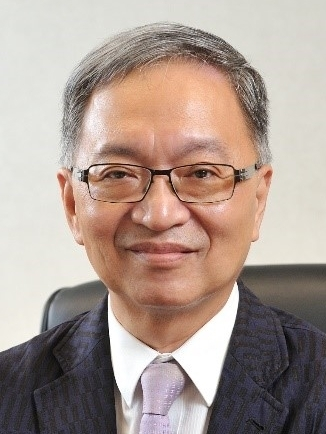
- Official portrait, 2022

5th Minister of Health and Welfare
- In office 18 July 2022 – 20 May 2024
- Prime Minister: Su Tseng-chang; Chen Chien-jen
- Deputy: List: Victor Wang, Lee Li-Feng (Deputy) Shih Chung-Liang (Vice)
- Preceded by: Chen Shih-chung
- Succeeded by: Chiu Tai-yuan

Vice Minister of Health and Welfare
- In office August 2017 – 18 July 2022
- Minister: Chen Shih-chung
- Deputy: Ho Chi-kung, Lu Pau-ching
- Preceded by: Tsai Sen-tien
- Succeeded by: Victor Wang

Personal details
- Born: June 17, 1955 (age 71)
- Party: Democratic Progressive Party
- Education: Taipei Medical University (MD); National Taiwan University (LLB, LLM)

Hsueh Jui-yuan (Chinese: 薛瑞元; pinyin: Xuē Ruìyuán; born June 1955) is a Taiwanese physician and lawyer who served as the vice minister of Health and Welfare from August 2017 to July 18, 2022. He then served as the Minister of Health and Welfare from July 2022 to May 2024.

== Education ==
Hsueh completed his Doctor of Medicine (M.D.) at Taipei Medical University in 1980. He then earned his bachelor's degree and master's degree in law from National Taiwan University in 1997 and 2001, respectively.

== Careers ==
At the Bureau of Medical Affairs of the Department of Health, he was the senior secretary in 2002–2003, deputy director-general in 2003-2004 and director-general in 2004–2008. In 2008–2015, he was the deputy superintendent of Shuang Ho Hospital of Taipei Medical University. Hsueh succeeded Chen Shih-chung as Minister of Health and Welfare on July 18, 2022.
