= Lu Pau-ching =

Taiwanese sociologist

- 呂寶靜

Deputy Minister of Health and Welfare of the Republic of China
- Incumbent
- Assumed office 20 May 2016
- Minister: Lin Tzou-yien
- Vice: Tsai Sen-tien; Hsueh Jui-yuan
- Succeeded by: Su Li-chiung

Personal details
- Education: National Taiwan University (BA, MA); University of Michigan (MSW, PhD)

Lu Pau-ching (Chinese: 呂寶靜; pinyin: Lǚ Bǎojìng) is a Taiwanese sociologist who has served as the Deputy Minister of Health and Welfare of Taiwan since 20 May 2016.

== Education ==
Lu graduated from National Taiwan University with a bachelor's degree in sociology and a master's degree in sociology in 1977 and 1979, respectively. She then completed doctoral studies in the United States, where she earned a Master of Social Work (M.S.W.) in 1985 and her Ph.D. in sociology in 1990, both from the University of Michigan. Her doctoral dissertation was titled, "Entering and continuing labor force participation: Taiwanese women, marriage, and work".

== Academic careers ==
After receiving her doctorate, Lu joined the faculty of National Chengchi University, where she became an associate professor, then full professor, and then the chairperson of the Department of Sociology in 1994–2002, 2002-2004 and 2004-2006, respectively. In 2006–2009, she was the professor and chairperson of the Graduate Institute of Social Administration and Social Work.

== Ministry of Health and Welfare ==
At a press conference on 18 July 2016, Lu made an announcement on the three major additions to the Long-term Care Plan 2.0 to improve the quantity and quality of care for the elderly and disabled people which will start in 2017.
