= Bubble CPAP =

Noninvasive form of ventilation for newborns

- Specialty: Neonatology

Bubble CPAP is a non-invasive ventilation strategy for newborns with infant respiratory distress syndrome (IRDS). It is one of the methods by which continuous positive airway pressure (CPAP) is delivered to a spontaneously breathing newborn to maintain lung volumes during expiration. With this method, blended and humidified oxygen is delivered via short binasal prongs or a nasal mask and pressure in the circuit is maintained by immersing the distal end of the expiratory tubing in water. The depth to which the tubing is immersed underwater determines the pressure generated in the airways of the infant. As the gas flows through the system, it "bubbles" out and prevents buildup of excess pressures. Several studies have showed the usefullness of bubble CPAP for treatment of neonatal respiratory distress syndrome. In some settings, bubble CPAP has also shown benefits for treatment of children 1-59 months of age with sever pneumonia and hypoxemia.

Bubble CPAP is appealing because of its simplicity and low cost. It is also associated with a decreased incidence of bronchopulmonary dysplasia (BPD) compared to mechanical ventilation. Not all infants with IRDS are candidates for initial treatment with CPAP and not all those who are given CPAP can be successfully managed with this modality.

== History ==
In the early 1970s, Gregory et al. demonstrated that providing CPAP using an anesthesia bag improved oxygenation in preterm infants with respiratory distress syndrome. Subsequently, Jen-Tien Wung at Children's Hospital of New York, Columbia University developed the bubble CPAP system using short nasal prongs. In 1987 Avery et al. reported large differences in the risk-adjusted incidence of BPD in a comparison of 12 academic neonatal intensive care units in the United States. This study first identified the Columbia approach of using bubble CPAP in the delivery room as a possible strategy to reduce the incidence of BPD as compared to mechanical ventilation. During the H1N1 influenza outbreak in 2009, Dr. Aarti Kinikar made a "homemade" bubble CPAP machine in order to transition neonates off of ventilators so that ventilators could be used to help other patients. Over the pandemic's course, "Kinikar used bubble CPAP to support the breathing of hundreds of children at her hospital."

== Components ==
The bubble CPAP system consists of three major components:

1. Gas source: An oxygen blender connected to a source of oxygen and compressed air is used to supply an appropriate concentration of inspired oxygen (FiO2). The humidified blended oxygen is then circulated through corrugated tubing.

2. Pressure generator: Pressure in the bubble CPAP system is created by placing the distal expiratory tubing in water. Designated pressure is determined by the depth of tubing immersed.

3. Patient interface: Nasal prongs are used as the nasal interface between the circuit and the infant's airway. Short and wide nasal prongs allow for a low resistance to air flow. It is important that the nasal interface be applied to the infant without air leakage while taking measures to prevent nasal trauma.

== Nursing care ==
The successful application of bubble CPAP requires elaborate nursing care. There is a learning curve to the implementation of the bubble CPAP respiratory approach that requires a team effort. Respiratory therapists are important members of the team.

1. The system has to be snugly fitted and stationed on the infant's head. The nasal prongs can be secured by putting on an appropriate sized hat which rests on the lower part of the infant's ears and across the forehead. The tubing can be fastened with the help of safety pins and rubber bands.
2. Nasal prongs must be properly placed to prevent air leak. Application of a Velcro mustache placed over a piece of hydrocolloid dressing on the philtrum can prevent accidental incarceration of the prong on the nasal septum.
3. Gentle nasal suctioning is important to maintain clear airways.
4. Frequent decompression of the infant's stomach with an oro-gastric tube is necessary to promote comfort, and to prevent a distended stomach from splinting the diaphragm and compromising respiration.
