= Tsai Sen-tien =

Taiwanese physician (born 1948)

- 蔡森田

Vice Minister of Health and Welfare of the Republic of China
- In office June 2016 – August 2017
- Minister: Lin Tzou-yien
- Deputy: Ho Chi-kung, Lu Pau-ching
- Preceded by: Shiu Ming-neng
- Succeeded by: Hsueh Jui-yuan

Personal details
- Born: 28 October 1948 (age 77)
- Education: National Taiwan University (MB)

Tsai Sen-tien (Chinese: 蔡森田; pinyin: Cài Sēntián; born 28 October 1948) is a Taiwanese physician who was the Vice Minister of Health and Welfare from June 2016 until August 2017.

== Education ==
Tsai graduated from National Taiwan University with a Bachelor of Medicine (M.B.) in 1982.

== Medical careers ==
Tsai was the resident physician of the Department of Otorhinolaryngology of National Taiwan University Hospital in 1984–1988, deputy superintendent of National Cheng Kung University Hospital (NCKU Hospital) in 2003–2009, superintendent of Tainan Hospital and chairperson of Department of Radiation Oncology of NCKU Hospital in 2014–2016.

== Education careers ==
Tsai was the fellow of Department of Oncology of Johns Hopkins School of Medicine in the United States in 1990–1991, associate professor and professor of College of Medicine of National Cheng Kung University (NCKU) in 1995-1999 and since 1999 respectively and chairperson of Department of Otorhinolaryngology of NCKU in 1998–2003.
