= Ho Chi-kung =

Taiwanese politician

- 何啟功
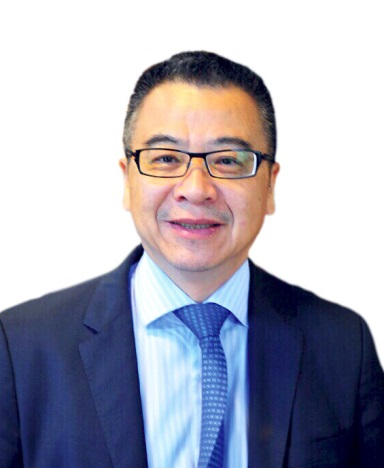

Deputy Minister of Health and Welfare of the Republic of China
- Incumbent
- Assumed office 20 May 2016
- Minister: Lin Tzou-yien
- Vice: Tsai Sen-tien; Hsueh Jui-yuan

Personal details
- Education: Kaohsiung Medical University (MB); National Taiwan University (MPH)

Ho Chi-kung (Chinese: 何啟功; pinyin: Hé Qǐgōng) was the Deputy Minister of Health and Welfare of the Republic of China since 20 May 2016.

== Education ==
Ho earned his Bachelor of Medicine (M.B.) from Kaohsiung Medical University in 1984 and his Master of Public Health (M.P.H.) from National Taiwan University in 1988.

== Medical careers ==
At the Kaohsiung Medical University Hospital, Ho had been the Resident of the Department of Internal Medicine in 1988–1991, Chief Resident of the Department of Occupational Medicine in 1991–1992, Attending Physician of the Department of Occupational Medicine in 1992–1994, Director of the Department of Occupational and Environmental Medicine in 1994-2007 and Director of the Department of Community Medicine in 2003–2007.
