= Chou Jih-haw =

Chou Jih-haw (Chinese: 周志浩) is a Taiwanese dentist and epidemiologist who was the director-general of the Taiwan Centers for Disease Control from 2016 to 2023.

== Life and career ==
Chou earned his dental degree in 1984 at Taipei Medical College. Between 1984 and 1986, Chou worked as a dentist in Changhua. He then received training in epidemiology from the Department of Health until 1989 and was affiliated with the DOH's Bureau of Communicable Disease Control from 1987 to 1989, when he was reassigned to serve as a leader of a branch of another DOH agency, the National Quarantine Service. During his tenure with the National Quarantine Service, Chou completed a master's in public health from National Taiwan University, where he specialized in epidemiology, and the University of California, Berkeley specialized in biochemistry . Both of his Master degrees were completed in 1992. Chou left the Department of Health for a post within the Taipei City Government's health department in 1997, leading research, planning, and development until 1999. From 1999 to 2003, he was deputy health commissioner of the Taipei County Government. After some time as leader of the Taipei County health department, Chou returned to the Executive Yuan's Department of Health as deputy director-general of the Taiwan Centers for Disease Control in 2003. During 2016, Chou was promoted to director-general of the Taiwan CDC, replacing Steve Kuo. In February 2023, Chou succeeded Shih Chung-liang as deputy minister of health, and was replaced at the Taiwan CDC by Chuang Jen-hsiang.
