= Cytomegalovirus esophagitis =

- Specialty: Gastroenterology, infectious disease

Cytomegalovirus esophagitis is a form of esophagitis associated with cytomegalovirus. Symptoms include dysphagia, upper abdominal pain, diarrhea, nausea, vomiting, and sometimes hematemesis. This condition occurs in the setting of patients with a weakened immune system who are susceptible to both infections by CMV and the manifestation of symptoms. A large majority of patient that have CMV Esophagitis are diagnosed with HIV. Another significant segment of the population have weakened immune systems through transplant surgery, diabetes, or due to medication. Diagnosis is done primarily by endoscopy with biopsy, as CMV Esophagitis has a distinctive pathology pattern of linear ulcers.

== Signs and symptoms ==
1. Dysphagia: Difficulty or pain while swallowing
2. Hematemesis: Blood while vomiting
3. Abdominal Pain: Pain in the upper abdominal area, usually exacerbated by swallowing. Pain can also manifest as heartburn symptoms
4. Nausea/vomiting
5. Fever

== Transmission ==
There are multiple ways cytomegalovirus can be transmitted. Mother to child transmission is common after childbirth. It can also be spread through blood or sex. Transmission via salvia, tears, or skin contact is rare.

== Diagnosis ==
The most effective diagnostic tool for CMV is endoscopy with biopsy. Generally on inspection of the esophagus large punched out lesions are seen in the middle part of the esophagus. Further histological evaluation of the lesions demonstrates enlarged cells in the sub-epithelial layer with inclusions within the cell's nucleus and its cytoplasm. In addition to the histological examination fluorescent staining with an immunoperoxidase stain is highly specific. Radiologic imaging techniques such as X-Rays or CT Scans are not effective in diagnosing CMV Esophagitis but can identify any resulting strictures or fistulas.

== Pathology ==
Macroscopy:

On a macroscopic basis, CMV Esophagitis may appear to be punched out lesions.

Microscopy:

Histology of CMV Esophagitis demonstrates enlarged cells with inclusions within both the cytoplasm and the nucleus of the cell. Also aggregates of macrophage cells are common on microscopic examination.

== Treatment ==
Treatment revolves around intravenous treatment of ganciclovir. Alternate treatments involve valganciclovir, or foscarnet. All of these medication can cause nausea, diarrhea, fever, loss of appetite. Rarer side effects include anemia and tremors.
