= Maribavir =

Antiviral drug

Clinical data
- Trade names: Livtencity
- Other names: 1263W94
- AHFS/Drugs.com: Monograph
- License data: US DailyMed: Maribavir
- Pregnancy category: AU: D
- Routes of administration: By mouth
- ATC code: J05AX10 (WHO)

Legal status
- Legal status: AU: S4 (Prescription only); CA: ℞-only; US: ℞-only; EU: Rx-only

Identifiers
- IUPAC name: (2S,3S,4R,5S)-2-[5,6-Dichloro-2-(propan-2-ylamino)benzimidazol-1-yl]-5-(hydroxymethyl)oxolane-3,4-diol
- CAS Number: 176161-24-3
- PubChem CID: 471161
- DrugBank: DB06234
- ChemSpider: 413807
- UNII: PTB4X93HE1
- KEGG: D04859
- ChEMBL: ChEMBL515408
- NIAID ChemDB: 070966
- CompTox Dashboard (EPA): DTXSID60170091

Chemical and physical data
- Formula: C_{15}H_{19}Cl_{2}N_{3}O_{4}
- Molar mass: 376.23 g·mol^{−1}
- 3D model (JSmol): Interactive image
- SMILES: CC(C)Nc1nc2cc(c(cc2n1[C@@H]3[C@H]([C@H]([C@@H](O3)CO)O)O)Cl)Cl
- InChI: InChI=1S/C15H19Cl2N3O4/c1-6(2)18-15-19-9-3-7(16)8(17)4-10(9)20(15)14-13(23)12(22)11(5-21)24-14/h3-4,6,11-14,21-23H,5H2,1-2H3,(H,18,19)/t11-,12-,13-,14-/m0/s1; Key:KJFBVJALEQWJBS-XUXIUFHCSA-N

Maribavir, sold under the brand name Livtencity, is an antiviral medication that is used to treat post-transplant cytomegalovirus (CMV). Maribavir is a cytomegalovirus pUL97 kinase inhibitor that works by preventing the activity of human cytomegalovirus enzyme pUL97, thus blocking virus replication.

The most common side effects include taste disturbance, nausea, diarrhea, vomiting and fatigue.

Maribavir was approved for medical use in the United States in November 2021, and in the European Union in November 2022. The US Food and Drug Administration (FDA) considers it to be a first-in-class medication.

== Medical uses ==
In the United States, maribavir is indicated to treat people twelve years of age and older and weighing at least 35 kilograms (77 lb) with post-transplant cytomegalovirus infection/disease that does not respond (with or without genetic mutations that cause resistance) to available antiviral treatment for cytomegalovirus.

In the European Union, maribavir is indicated for the treatment of cytomegalovirus (CMV) infection and/or disease that are refractory (with or without resistance) to one or more prior therapies, including ganciclovir, valganciclovir, cidofovir or foscarnet in adults who have undergone a hematopoietic stem cell transplant (HSCT) or solid organ transplant (SOT).

== Adverse effects ==
Adverse effects of maribavir include taste disturbances, nausea, and vomiting.

== Contraindications ==
The cytomegalovirus pUL97 kinase activates ganciclovir and valganciclovir, so coadministration with these medications is not recommended because maribavir may reduce their antiviral activity.

== History ==
Maribavir is licensed by ViroPharma from GlaxoSmithKline in 2003, for the prevention and treatment of human cytomegalovirus (HCMV) disease in hematopoietic stem cell/bone marrow transplant patients. The mechanism by which maribavir inhibits HCMV replication is by inhibition of an HCMV encoded protein kinase enzyme called UL97 or pUL97. Maribavir showed promise in phase II clinical trials and was granted fast track status, but failed to meet study goals in a phase III trial. However, the dosage used in the phase III trial may have been too low to be efficacious.

A phase II study with maribavir demonstrated that prophylaxis with maribavir displayed strong antiviral activity, as measured by statistically significant reduction in the rate of reactivation of CMV in recipients of hematopoietic stem cell/bone marrow transplants. In an intent-to-treat analysis of the first 100 days after the transplant, the number of subjects who required pre-emptive anti-CMV therapy was statistically significantly reduced with maribavir compared to placebo.

ViroPharma conducted a phase III clinical study to evaluate the prophylactic use for the prevention of cytomegalovirus disease in recipients of allogeneic stem cell transplant patients. In February 2009, ViroPharma announced that the phase III study failed to achieve its goal, showing no significant difference between maribavir and a placebo at reducing the rate at which CMV DNA levels were detected in patients.

The safety and efficacy of maribavir were evaluated in a phase III, multicenter, open-label, active-controlled trial that compared maribavir with a treatment assigned by a researcher running the study, which could include one or two of the following antivirals used to treat cytomegalovirus: ganciclovir, valganciclovir, foscarnet, or cidofovir. In the study, 352 transplant recipients with cytomegalovirus infections who did not respond (with or without resistance) to treatment randomly received maribavir or treatment assigned by a researcher for up to eight weeks. The study compared the two groups' plasma cytomegalovirus DNA concentration levels at the end of the study's eighth week, with efficacy defined as having a level below what is measurable. Of the 235 participants who received maribavir, 56% had levels of cytomegalovirus DNA below what was measurable versus 24% of the 117 participants who received an investigator-assigned treatment.

The US Food and Drug Administration (FDA) granted the application for maribavir orphan drug, breakthrough therapy and priority review designations. The FDA granted the approval of Livtencity to Takeda Pharmaceuticals Company Limited.

== Society and culture ==
=== Legal status ===
On 15 September 2022, the Committee for Medicinal Products for Human Use (CHMP) of the European Medicines Agency (EMA) adopted a positive opinion, recommending the granting of a marketing authorization for the medicinal product Livtencity, intended for the treatment of cytomegalovirus (CMV) infection and/or disease that is refractory to one or more prior therapies. The applicant for this medicinal product is Takeda Pharmaceuticals International AG Ireland Branch. Maribavir was approved for medical use in the European Union in November 2022.
