= Acute retinal necrosis =

Acute Retinal Necrosis
- Specialty: Ophthalmology, optometry

Acute retinal necrosis (ARN) is a medical inflammatory condition of the eye. The condition presents itself as a necrotizing retinitis. The inflammation onset is due to certain herpes viruses, varicella zoster virus (VZV), herpes simplex virus (HSV-1 and HSV-2) and Epstein–Barr virus (EBV).

People with the condition usually display redness of the eye, white or off-white colored patches that are patches of retinal necrosis. ARN can progress into other conditions such as uveitis, detachment of the retina, and ultimately can lead to blindness.

The disease was first characterized in 1971, in Japan. Akira Urayama and his colleagues had six patients whose cases showed signs of acute necrotizing retinitis, retinal arteritis, choroiditis, and late-onset retinal detachment. The combination of the conditions was given the name acute retinal necrosis. The first reports of ARN came about in 1971. It is unclear whether it was previously just reported as something else. Urayama and his colleagues reported the disease that they saw in six Japanese patients. Since then the disease has been seen in patient's with AIDS, children, and people who are immunocompromised. In 1978, Young and Bird named the disease when presented in both eyes, Bilateral Acute Retinal Necrosis, otherwise known as BARN.

== Signs and symptoms ==
Patients with ARN typically present Though uncommon, some patients may experience pain. Most patients will only experience this in one eye (unilateral), though possible for the condition to be seen in both (bilateral, BARN). If the first eye is left without treatment, some cases have shown the disease progressing to the other eye in a month's time. Further progressed stages of the disease can cause blindness in the eye experiencing ARN. Though the disease may be present itself, the inflammation of the retina may not been visualized for decades after the initial signs.

- floaters
- redness of the eye
- flashes
- decreased sharpness of vision
- photophobia.

== Causes ==
ARN is associated with people who have latent herpes viruses that have been reactivated. The most common causes of the disease have been linked to VZV, HSV-1, HSV-2, and CMV respectively.

ARN cases have been reported in patients who have AIDS, are immunocompromised and in children. The disease is not limited to a specific gender. Most cases have been reported in young adults though children and the elderly can be affected.

Specific genetic markers in Caucasians in the United States have shown elevated risk for disease development (HLA-DQw7 and Bw62, DR4) as well as HLA-Aw33, B44, and DRw6 in the Japanese population.

== Pathophysiology ==
ARN presentation in individuals can be characterized by two separate phases as listed below.

=== Acute Herpetic Phase ===
The acute herpetic phase is characterized by when viral particles infiltrate the retina and vitreous causing an inflammatory reaction. Together, the viral particles and mononuclear cells in the vitreous cause the retina to become opaque. In response to all this, lymphocytes and plasma cells diffuse into the vitreous as well.

=== Late Cicatricial Phase ===
The late cicatricial phase of ARN includes changes in the way the vitreous is organized due to the cellular infiltration seen in the previous phase. In the vitreous and on top of the thinned necrotic retina, contractile membranes may form. If left untreated, 50 to 75% of patients with ARN will experience detachment of their retina in the affected eye.

== Diagnosis ==
Diagnosis of ARN is outlined by the American Uveitis Society. Though most diagnoses of ARN are made by clinical features, a physician may take a vitreous sample and have it tested for herpes markers. Common lab tests that are run on the sample include a viral culture, viral PCR, direct/indirect immunofluorescence, viral antibody measurement.

The American Uveitis Society has established the following guidelines for ARN diagnosis:

1. Retinal necrosis with one or more focus points borders in the peripheral retina
2. In the absence of antiviral treatment, the condition progresses rapidly
3. Spreading to the surroundings
4. Buildup of blood vessels
5. Inflammation of the vitreous.

== Prevention ==
While there is no prevention for ARN, exposing a patient to antiviral agents in the earlier phases of the outbreak tend to decrease the duration of the active phase of the disease. Taking antiviral agents after the issue is resolved seems to lessen the chance of it spreading to the other eye.

== Treatment ==
=== Medication ===
Currently treatment of ARN consists of antiviral therapy administered orally. Typical antiviral agents used include famciclovir, valganciclovir, and valacyclovir. While on these medications, a patient's kidney function should be watched. Some physician's also may administer the antiviral agents via intravitreal delivery. Though controversial, some physicians administer steroids (prednisone) and antithrombotic therapy (aspirin).

Some commonly administered antiviral agents are as follows:

- Acyclovir
- Famciclovir
- Valacyclovir
- Gancicilovir
- Valganciclovir

== Research ==
In a study done published by the British Journal of Ophthalmology, the cases of ARN/BARN reported in 2001-2002 in the UK, Varicella Zoster Virus was the most common culprit for the disease and presented mostly in men than in women.

Researchers have also looked at two cases of ARN in patients who have been diagnosed with an immunodeficiency virus. The disease presented itself more so in the outer retina until it progressed far enough to then affect the inner retina. The patients were not so responsive to the antiviral agents given to them through an IV, acyclovir specifically. The cases progressed to retinal detachment. The patients tested positive for the herpes virus. Researchers are now wondering if this type of ARN is specific to those who have the immunodeficiency virus.

== See also ==
- Cytomegalovirus retinitis
- Progressive outer retinal necrosis
