= Marvin J. Johnson Award =

Annual microbial and biochemical technology award

The Marvin J. Johnson Award in microbial and biochemical technology is awarded annually by the American Chemical Society "to encourage and reward outstanding research in microbial biochemical technology". The award is named after Marvin J. Johnson, professor of biochemistry at the University of Wisconsin. It is the highest honor of the Biochemical Technology Division of ACS.

== Recipients ==
- 2026: Vassily Hatzimanikatis
- 2025: Yi Tang
- 2024: Kristala Jones Prather
- 2023: Matthew DeLisa
- 2022: Anne Skaja Robinson
- 2021: James J. Collins
- 2020: James Swartz
- 2019: Kelvin Lee
- 2018: Huimin Zhou
- 2017: Wilfred Chen
- 2016: David Schaffer
- 2015: Michael Betenbaugh
- 2014: William Bentley
- 2013: Jay Keasling
- 2012: Sang Yup Lee
- 2011: Abraham Lenhoff
- 2010: Bernard Palsson
- 2009: James C. Liao
- 2008: Barry Buckland
- 2007: Jonathan Dordick
- 2006: Douglas S. Clark
- 2005: Wei-Shou Hu
- 2004: Robert Kelly
- 2003: George Georgiou
- 2002: Michael Ladisch
- 2001: Gregory Stephanopoulos
- 2000: Jerome Schultz

== See also ==
- List of chemistry awards
