= Cytomegalovirus retinitis =

- Other names: CMV retinitis
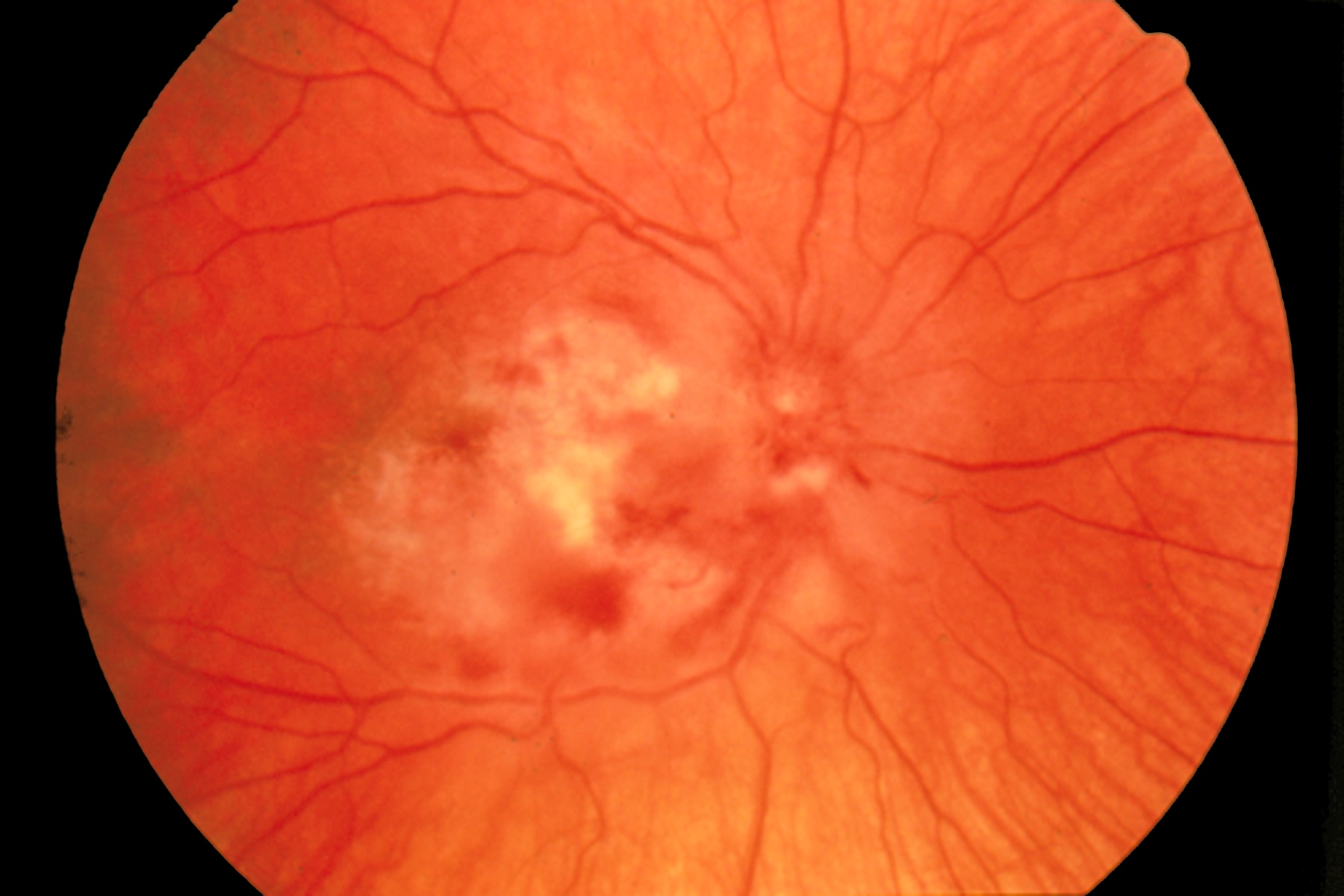
- Fundus photograph of CMV retinitis
- Specialty: Ophthalmology, infectious diseases
- Symptoms: Blurred vision
- Causes: Bone marrow transplant, HIV/AIDS
- Diagnostic method: Ophthalmologic exam, blood test
- Differential diagnosis: HIV Retinopathy
- Medication: Antivirals (oral or intraocular injection)

Cytomegalovirus retinitis, also known as CMV retinitis, is an inflammation of the retina of the eye that can lead to blindness. Caused by human cytomegalovirus, it occurs predominantly in people whose immune system has been compromised, including 15-40% of those with AIDS.

== Signs and symptoms ==
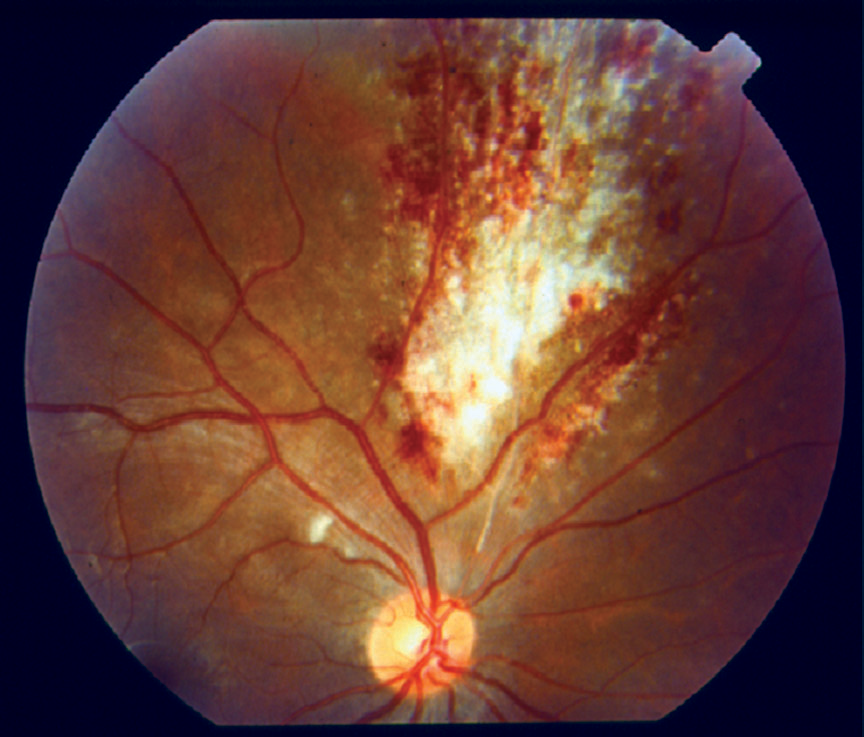
The typical "pizza pie" appearance of the fundus in CMV retinitis

The symptoms of cytomegalovirus retinitis have it usually starting in one eye (and also have the possibility of retinal detachment), presenting as:

- Blurred vision
- Blind spots
- Specks in your vision

== Cause ==
Cytomegalovirus (a type of herpes virus) is what causes cytomegalovirus retinitis. Other types of herpes viruses include herpes simplex viruses and Epstein-Barr virus. Once an individual is infected with these viruses they stay in the body for life. What triggers the virus to reactivate are the following (though CMV can also be congenital).

- Leukemia
- AIDS
- Immunosuppressive chemotherapy

== Mechanism ==
Human cytomegalovirus (HCMV or CMV) is a DNA virus in the family Herpesviridae known for producing large cells with nuclear and cytoplasmic inclusions, CMV infects around 40% of the population worldwide.Those areas infected by cytomegalovirus have cells evolve to necrosis, though inflammation within the retina is not great. Rhegmatogenous retinal detachments can occur following the development of holes in areas of healed retinitis (retina may be atrophic). Proliferative vitreoretinopathy has been observed in cases of retinal detachment.

== Diagnosis ==
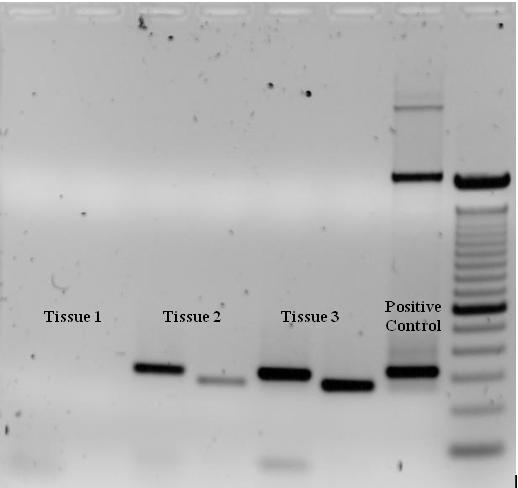
PCR result, Gel electrophoresis

The diagnosis of CMV retinitis can be done via the following:

- Ophthalmic screening frequency is based on CD4 count,(CD4 < 50 cells/mL, 0- 35% possibility of CMV retinitis)
- BUN
- CD8+ T-lymphocyte count
- CMV DNA capture ( polymerase chain reaction (PCR) test)
- DNA PCR ( ocular fluids)
- Viral load
- Complete blood count

=== Differential diagnosis ===
Another condition seen in AIDS patients that is similar and more common than CMV retinitis is HIV Retinopathy. Early signs of CMV retinitis may resemble cotton-wool spots seen in HIV Retinopathy, but with close observation over several weeks, CMV retinitis can be seen to enlarge while the cotton-wool spots fade.

== Treatment ==
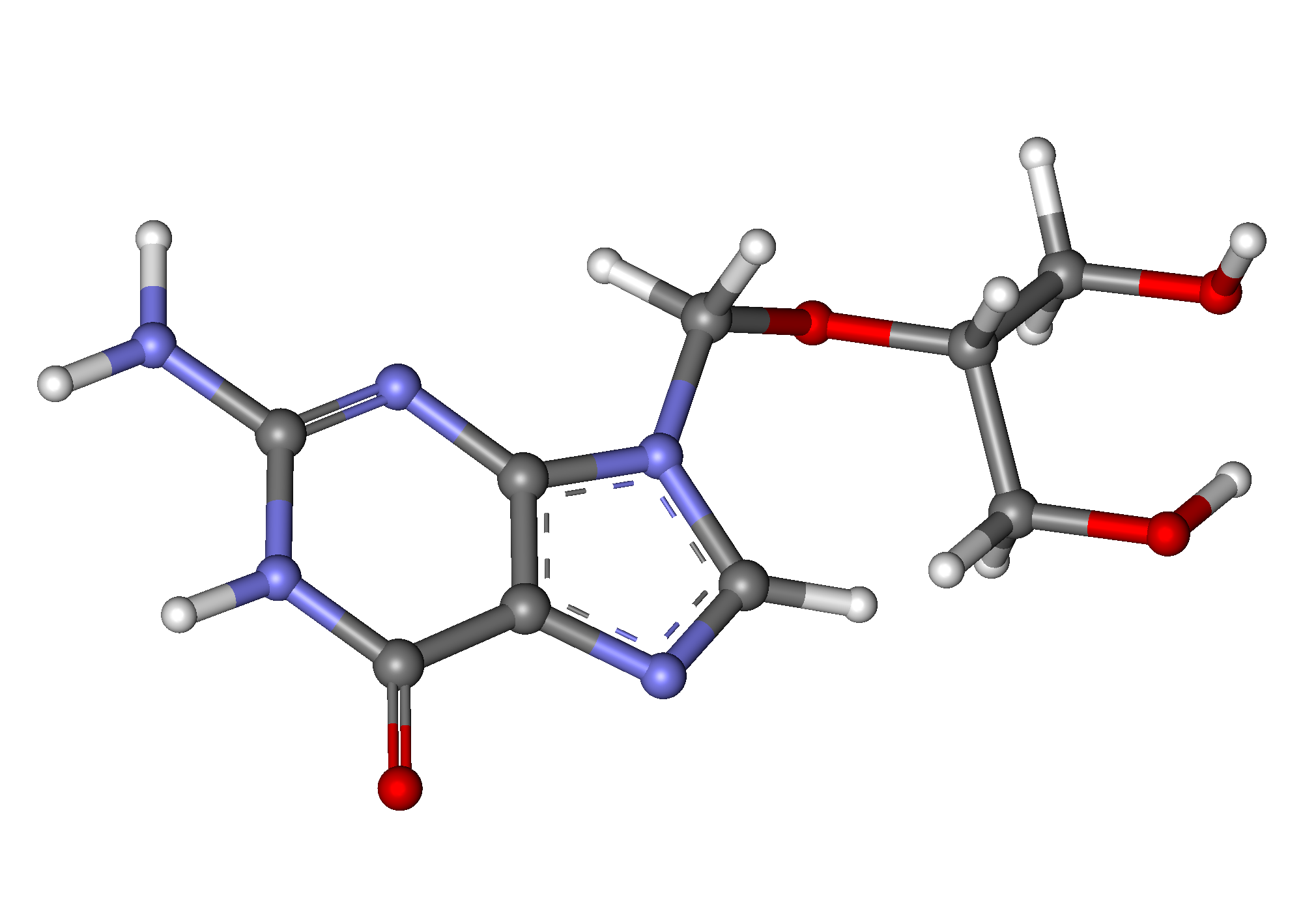
Ganciclovir

In terms of the treatment of cytomegalovirus retinitis, oral valganciclovir, intravenous ganciclovir, IV foscarnet, and IV cidofovir are all efficient in the treatment of this condition. Also intravitreal injections, an injection of medicine into the vitreous near the retina, of foscarnet in concomitance with oral valganciclovir can be used for treatment as well.Often individuals with CMV retinitis will need surgery for either retinal detachment or intravitreal instillation of ganciclovir. Retinal detachment occurs in up to 29% of affected eyes, repair being most effective with endolaser and silicone oil endotamponade. Intravitreal ganciclovir implant has the benefit of less systemic toxicity. An adverse effect of this is retinal detachment (and vitreous hemorrhage), also there is no systemic beneficial effect for cytomegalovirus organ disease.

== See also ==
- List of systemic diseases with ocular manifestations
- Progressive outer retinal necrosis
