= Claude H. Nash =

American biochemist

Claude H. Nash (born 1943) was CEO of Bloodstone Ventures plc. from 2007 to 2010. From 2004 to 2006 he was vice president, research and development at the University of Maryland Biotechnology Institute. He previously cofounded, and was CEO and chairman of, ViroPharma Incorporated, a pharmaceutical company. Before founding ViroPharma, Nash was vice president of infectious disease and cancer research at the Schering-Plough Research Institute.

== Education ==
Nash has a B.S. in biology and chemistry from Lamar University, an M.S. in microbiology (1966) and a Ph.D. in microbial genetics and biochemistry (1969) from Colorado State University.

== Pharmaceutical career ==
From 1983 to 1994 Nash served as vice president for infectious disease and oncology at Schering Plough Research Institute. During that time, he was involved in the discovery and development of numerous biological agents, antibiotics, and antifungals. Previously, he was head of biological research at Sterling Drug, head of infectious disease at SmithKline Beecham, and head of Fermentation Technology Group at Eli Lilly.

In 1997 Nash co-founded and, until 2000, was chairman, president and CEO of ViroPharma Incorporated, a pharmaceutical company based in Exton, Pennsylvania. Under his leadership ViroPharma completed an initial public offering, raised capital through public and private financing, and filed various INDs and an NDA for pleconaril to treat the common cold.

Nash currently serves or has served on the boards of directors for ViroPharma Incorporated (1997–2002), Adolor Corporation (since January 2000), Accera Pharmaceuticals, NoCopi Technologies and The Burnham Institute.

== Academic service and honors ==
In 1984–1985 he was president of the Society for Industrial Microbiology. He received the Charles Porter Award from the Society for Industrial Microbiology and is a member of American Academy of Microbiology, Phi Kappa Phi, Sigma Xi. In 2002 he was honored as a distinguished alumnus of the College of Veterinary Medicine and Biomedical Sciences at Colorado State University.
