= Yi Tang (biochemist) =

Biochemist

- Education: Pennsylvania State University (BS); California Institute of Technology (PhD)
- Scientific career
- Fields: Biochemistry, Chemical Engineering, Natural product biosynthesis
- Workplaces: University of California, Los Angeles
- Doctoral advisor: David A. Tirrell
- Other academic advisors: Chaitan Khosla (Postdoc)
- Website: sites.google.com/site/yitanglab/

Yi Tang is a biochemist and professor in the Department of Chemistry and Biochemistry as well as the Parson's Family Foundation Professor in the Department of Chemical and Biomolecular Engineering at the University of California, Los Angeles. His research interests include the discovery, functional characterization, and engineering of natural product biosynthetic enzymes. He received the 2014 Eli Lilly Award in Biological Chemistry.

== Education ==
Tang attended college at Pennsylvania State University and earned his PhD in Chemistry in 2002 from the California Institute of Technology, where he worked in the lab of Professor David Tirrell. He then studied under Chaitan Khosla at Stanford University in Chemical Biology.

== Career and research ==
From 2002 to 2004, Tang pursued postdoctoral studies at the Stanford University in the lab of Professor Chaitan Khosla. In 2004, Tang joined the faculty of the Department of Chemical and Biomolecular Engineering the University of California, Los Angeles. His group's research has focused on studying the biosynthesis of natural products from Streptomyces and filamentous fungi as well as engineering enzymes that can be used for the production of pharmaceutical compounds. One demonstration of the latter approach has been his group's development of a biocatalytic approach for making the commonly prescribed lipid-lowering medication simvastatin.

Web of Science lists 254 publications authored by Tang in peer-reviewed scientific journals that have been cited over 10,000 times, leading to an h-index of 58. His lab's three most cited papers have been cited >180 times each.

=== Awards and honors ===
- 2006 – National Science Foundation Career Award
- 2006 – Presidential Early Career Award in Science and Engineering (PECASE)
- 2008 – The Camille Dreyfus Teacher Scholar Award
- 2009 – Sloan Research Fellowship
- 2010 – Society for Industrial Microbiology (SIM) Young Investigator Award
- 2012 – American Chemical Society Arthur C. Cope Scholar Award
- 2012 – National Institute of Health Director’s Pioneer Award (DP1)
- 2014 – Eli Lilly Award in Biological Chemistry
- 2015 – California Institute of Technology Chemical Engineering Robert W. Vaughan Lectureship
- 2025 - ACS BIOT Marvin J. Johnson Award
