= Purtscher's retinopathy =

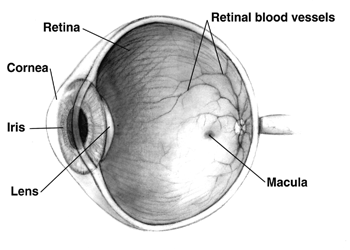
- Anatomy of eye(Retina on top)
- Specialty: Ophthalmology

Purtscher's retinopathy is a disease where part of the eye (retina) is damaged. Usually associated with severe head injuries, it may also occur with other types of trauma, such as long bone fractures, or with several non-traumatic systemic diseases. However, the exact cause of the disease is not well understood. There are no treatments specific for Purtscher's retinopathy, and the prognosis varies. The disease can threaten vision, sometimes causing temporary or permanent blindness. It is named for the Austrian ophthalmologist, Othmar Purtscher (1852–1927), who detected it in 1910 and described it fully in 1912.

The term Purtscher-like retinopathy is used when there is no history of trauma.

== Presentation ==
=== Associated diseases ===
- Severe head, chest, or long bone trauma
- Acute pancreatitis
- Amniotic fluid embolism
- Chronic kidney failure
- Dermatomyositis
- Fat embolism syndrome
- Scleroderma
- Systemic lupus erythematosus (SLE)
- Thrombotic thrombocytopenic purpura (TTP)

== Pathophysiology ==
Purtscher's retinopathy likely involves complex pathophysiology, with several contributing factors, including complement-mediated aggregates, fat, air, fibrin clots and platelet clumps. The diseases leads to the formation of cotton wool spots in the retina, a finding observed in several other diseases, and atrophy of the optic nerve.

== Diagnosis ==
Where trauma is involved, only a funduscopic examination of the back of the eye (retina) is necessary to make the diagnosis. Fluoroscein angiography may show a decrease in blood flow to the areas of whiteness in the retina. Typical features are Purtscher flecken (polygonal white areas in the retina) with perivascular clearing.

== Treatment ==
It may be treated with triamcinolone in some cases. However, in general, there are no treatments for Purtscher's retinopathy. If it is caused by a systemic disease or emboli, then those conditions should be treated.

== Prognosis ==
Purtscher's retinopathy can lead to loss of vision, and recovery of vision may occur very little. However, vision recovery does occur in some cases, and reports have varied on the long-term prognosis.

== History ==
Purtscher's retinopathy was first characterized in 1910 and 1912 as a syndrome of sudden blindness after head trauma, with patches of hemorrhage and whitening of the retina in both eyes. Later, it was discovered to occur after other types of trauma, such as chest trauma, and is associated with several non-traumatic systemic diseases. Purtscher's retinopathy may also be associated with acute pancreatitis, vasculitis, embolization of such materials as fat and amniotic fluid, systemic lupus erythematosus, thrombotic thrombocytopenic purpura, and chronic kidney failure. Purtscher's retinopathy may be caused by extensive fractures of the long bones.
