= Wei-Shou Hu =

Taiwanese-American chemical engineer

- 胡維碩
- Born: November 5, 1951 (age 74); Taiwan
- Education: National Taiwan University (BS); Massachusetts Institute of Technology (MS, PhD)
- Known for: Cell culture engineering
- Awards: Marvin J. Johnson Award (2005)
- Scientific career
- Fields: Chemical engineering Biochemical engineering
- Workplaces: University of Minnesota
- Thesis: Quantitative and mechanistic analysis of mammalian cell cultivation on microcarriers (1983)
- Doctoral advisor: Daniel Wang

Wei-Shou Hu (Chinese: 胡維碩; born November 5, 1951) is a Taiwanese biochemical engineer who is the Distinguished McKnight University Professor of Chemical Engineering and Material Science at the University of Minnesota.

== Education and career ==
Hu earned his B.S. in agricultural chemistry from National Taiwan University in 1974 and his Master of Science (M.S.) in 1982 and his Ph.D. in biochemical engineering from the Massachusetts Institute of Technology (MIT) under Daniel I.C. Wang in 1983. He has been a professor with the University of Minnesota since 1983. Hu has long impacted the field of cell culture bioprocessing since its infancy by steadfastly introducing quantitative and systematic analysis into this field. His work, which covers areas such as modeling and controlling cell metabolism, modulating glycosylation, and process data mining, has helped shape the advances of biopharmaceutical process technology. He recently led an industrial consortium to embark on genomic research on Chinese hamster ovary cells, the main workhorse of biomanufacturing, and to promote post-genomic research in cell bioprocessing.

Hu's research focuses on the field of cell culture bioprocessing, particularly metabolic control of the physiological state of the cell. In addition to his work with Chinese hamster ovary cells, his work has enabled the use of process engineering for cell therapy, especially with liver cells. Hu has written four different biotechnology books. One of his articles is cited by 63.

He is the 2005 recipient of the Marvin J. Johnson Award from the American Chemical Society, the distinguished service award of Society of Biological Engineers, a special award from Asia Pacific Biochemical Engineering Conference (2009), and the Amgen Award from Engineering Conferences International, as well as both the distinguished service award and the Division award from the Food, Pharmaceuticals and Bioengineering Division of the American Institute of Chemical Engineers. He has authored the books Bioseparations, Cell Culture Technology for Pharmaceutical and Cell-Based Therapies and Cell Culture Bioprocess Engineering
