= Kristien Mortelmans =

- Born: Ostend, Belgium
- Education: Stanford University
- Scientific career
- Workplaces: SRI International

Kristien E. Mortelmans is a microbiologist at SRI International's Biosciences Center for Immunology and Infectious Diseases, holding the title of "senior microbiologist emeritus". She specializes in screening compounds for antimicrobial activity; in particular; she also studies the biodegradation of explosives, the study of antibiotic resistance, and industrial microbiology (developing plastics and fuels).

== Early life and education ==
Mortelmans grew up in Ostend, Belgium, and moved to the United States in fall 1965 after her fiancé was accepted to Stanford University to a master's program in electrical engineering, and they married the following Christmas. She initially took Palo Alto High School to improve her skills as a typist at Kaiser Electronics and Aerospace, and continued her education after her husband graduated from Stanford and they moved to Sunnyvale so he could work at IBM. There, she attended the new De Anza College to build up credit to eventually transfer to a bachelor's program at San Jose State or Stanford; she was accepted to both programs, and picked Stanford.

At Stanford, Mortelmans initially had enough prior credits to finish a degree in biology in two years, and found microbiology to be particularly fascinating. She earned a degree in Medical Microbiology, and continued into the Ph.D. program there, focusing on Salmonella plasmids, eventually having one named after her, pKM101; that plasmid is a key component in the Ames test (named for Bruce Ames).

== Career ==
After receiving her Ph.D. from Stanford, Bruce Ames directed Mortelmans to SRI International, where she was hired in 1976.

She was Director of the Microbiology Program for 20 years and then became an inhouse microbiologist at the institute. She was the Principal Investigator on several projects, including some for the National Institute of Environmental Health Sciences, the Food and Drug Administration and the Environmental Protection Agency.

== Awards and memberships ==
She was the president of the Society for Industrial Microbiology (SIM) from 2000 to 2001, and was the editor in chief of SIM News from 1992 to 2002. In 2002, she received the Charles Porter Award from SIM for her work with the organization.

In 2000, she was named a Fellow of SRI.

In 2024 she was named a Fellow of SMI.
