= Joan W. Bennett =

American fungal geneticist and advocate for women in science

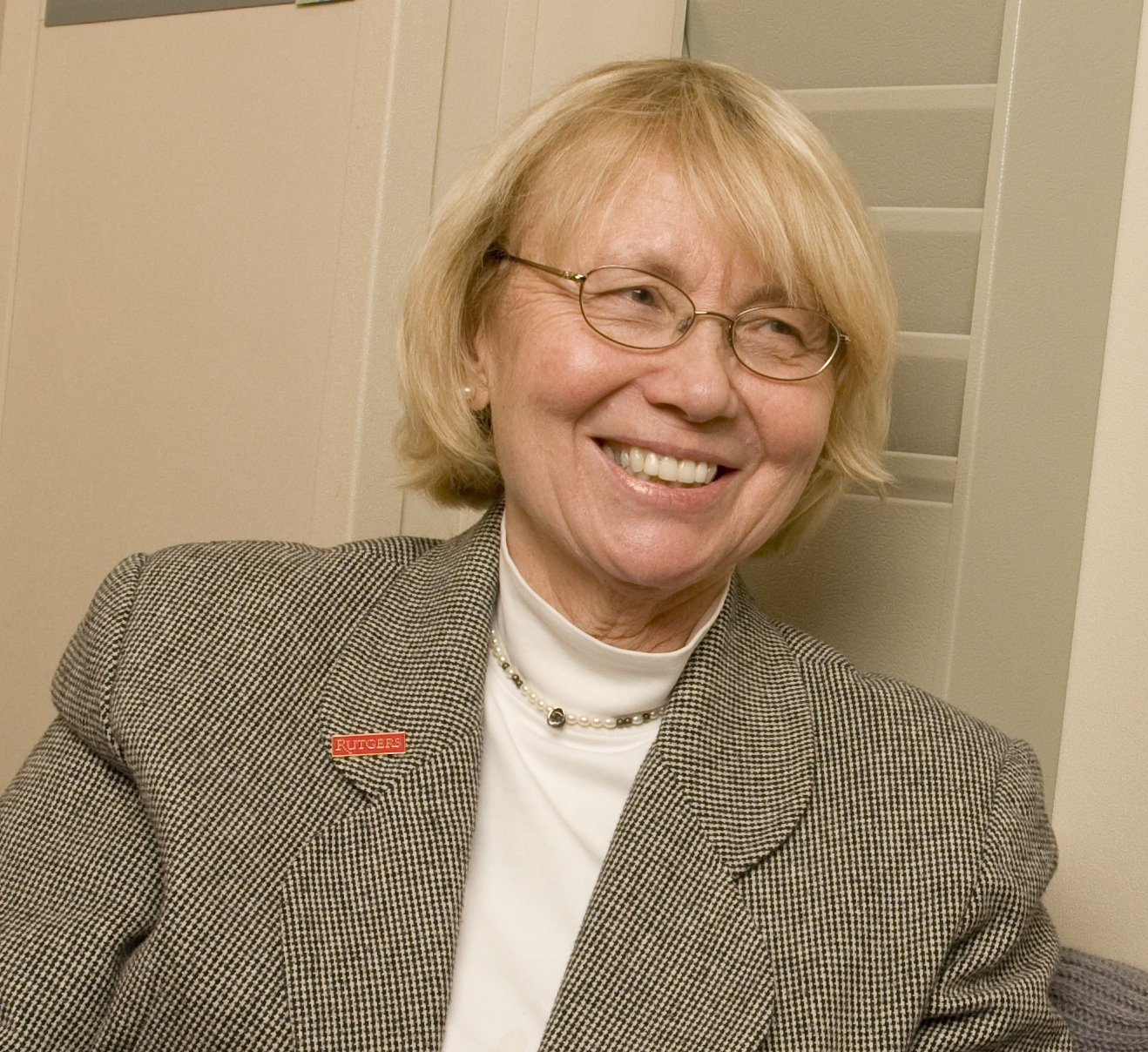
- Bennett in 2009
- Education: University of Chicago (PhD), Upsala College (BS)
- Known for: Mycotoxin biosynthesis, fungal VOCs, women in science advocacy
- Awards: National Academy of Sciences (2005), American Academy of Arts and Sciences (2021), Distinguished Mycologist (2024), Carski Teaching Award (1999)
- Scientific career
- Fields: Mycology, Fungal genetics
- Workplaces: Tulane University, Rutgers University, Tulane University- returned in 2025

Joan Wennstrom Bennett is an American fungal geneticist, recognized for her pioneering research on mycotoxins and fungal volatile organic compounds (VOCs), as well as for her leadership in promoting gender equity in science. She is the Ida A. Ricardson Professor of Botany, at Tulane University and a member of the National Academy of Sciences and the American Academy of Arts and Sciences.

== Education ==
Bennett earned her B.S. in Biology and History from Upsala College in 1963. She completed her M.S. (1964) and Ph.D. (1967) in Botany at the University of Chicago, where she was a U.S. Public Health Service Trainee in Genetics.

== Career ==
From 1971 to 2006, Bennett was a faculty member at Tulane University in New Orleans, where she taught genetics at all levels and was repeatedly honored for her teaching. In 2006, following Hurricane Katrina, she joined Rutgers University, initially as Associate Vice President to establish the Office for the Promotion of Women in Science, Engineering, and Mathematics. She has since served as Distinguished Professor, first in the Department of Plant Biology and in the Department of Biochemistry and Microbiology. Currently, as of 2026, she is the Ida A. Richardson Chair of Botany in the Department of Ecology and Evolutionary Biology in Tulane University's School of Science and Engineering.

== Research ==
Bennett's early research focused on the genetics and biosynthesis of mycotoxins in species such as Aspergillus flavus and A. parasiticus. After Hurricane Katrina, she shifted her research to study fungal VOCs—low molecular weight compounds that contribute to mold odors and may affect indoor air quality and health.

Her lab at Rutgers developed genetic model systems to investigate the biological effects of VOCs, demonstrating, for instance, that 1-octen-3-ol ("mushroom alcohol") is the neurotoxic in Drosophila melanogaster and can inhibit plant and the fungal growth. She has also shown that VOCs from Trichoderma can enhance growth in Arabidopsis and tomato plants. Her work helped shape the National Academies' agenda on indoor microbiology, and she chaired its consensus study on Microbiomes of the Built Environment in 2017.

== Advocacy for women in science ==
Throughout her career, Bennett has been an advocate for women and minorities in science. She served as Chair of the National Academies Committee on Women in Science, Engineering and Medicine from 2018 to 2021. At Rutgers, she led the institutional efforts to promote gender equity in STEM fields and has continued to speak and write on the topic nationally and internationally.

== Professional service ==
Bennett has served as the president of both the American Society for Microbiology (1990–91) and the Society for Industrial Microbiology and Biotechnology (2001–02). She has been a visiting scholar at institutions including Leiden University and the USDA’s Southern Regional Research Center. She has consulted for industry and government and has served on the numerous editorial boards, including as editor-in-chief of Mycologia and co-editor-in-chief of Advances in Applied Microbiology.

== Personal life ==
Bennett is married to David Lorenz Peterson, a computer systems consultant. She is the mother of three sons: John Frank Bennett, Daniel Edgerton Bennett and Mark Bradford Bennett.

== Awards and honors ==
- 1990 – Honorary Doctor of Literature, Upsala College
- 1999 – Carski Teaching Award, American Society for Microbiology
- 2005 – Charles Porter Award, Society for Industrial Microbiology
- 2005 – Elected Member, National Academy of Sciences
- 2005 – Honorary Doctor of Science, Bethany College
- 2006 – Alice C. Evans Award, American Society for Microbiology
- 2007 – Honorary Professor, Chinese Academy of Sciences
- 2010 – Honorary Professor, Yunnan University
- 2021 – Elected Fellow, American Academy of Arts and Sciences
- 2024 – Distinguished Mycologist Award, Mycological Society of America
- 2024 – Fellowship Award, International Mycological Association
