= Pleconaril =

Antiviral drug

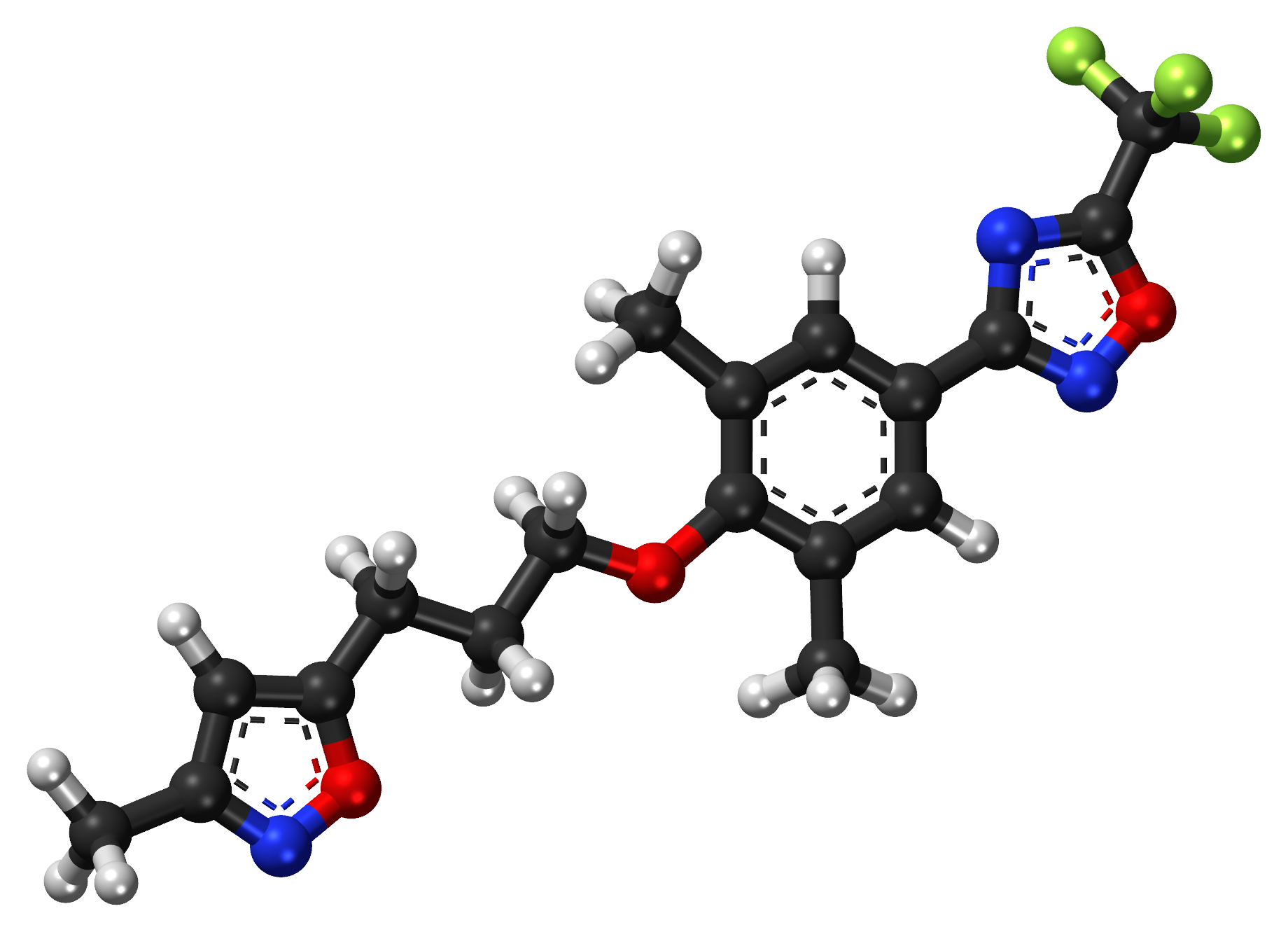

Clinical data
- Routes of administration: Oral, intranasal
- ATC code: J05AX06 (WHO)

Legal status
- Legal status: ?

Pharmacokinetic data
- Bioavailability: 70% (oral)
- Protein binding: >99%
- Metabolism: Hepatic
- Excretion: <1% excreted unchanged in urine

Identifiers
- IUPAC name: 3-{3,5-dimethyl-4-[3-(3-methylisoxazol-5-yl)propoxy] phenyl}-5-(trifluoromethyl)-1,2,4-oxadiazole
- CAS Number: 153168-05-9
- PubChem CID: 1684
- DrugBank: DB05105
- ChemSpider: 1621
- UNII: 9H4570Q89D
- ChEMBL: ChEMBL29609
- PDB ligand: W11 (PDBe, RCSB PDB)
- CompTox Dashboard (EPA): DTXSID8057649
- ECHA InfoCard: 100.208.947

Chemical and physical data
- Formula: C_{18}H_{18}F_{3}N_{3}O_{3}
- Molar mass: 381.355 g·mol^{−1}
- 3D model (JSmol): Interactive image
- SMILES: FC(F)(F)c1nc(no1)c3cc(c(OCCCc2onc(c2)C)c(c3)C)C
- InChI: InChI=1S/C18H18F3N3O3/c1-10-7-13(16-22-17(27-24-16)18(19,20)21)8-11(2)15(10)25-6-4-5-14-9-12(3)23-26-14/h7-9H,4-6H2,1-3H3; Key:KQOXLKOJHVFTRN-UHFFFAOYSA-N

Pleconaril (Picovir) is an antiviral drug that was being developed by Schering-Plough for prevention of asthma exacerbations and common cold symptoms in patients exposed to picornavirus respiratory infections. Pleconaril, administered either orally or intranasally, is active against viruses in the Picornaviridae family, including Enterovirus and Rhinovirus. It has shown useful activity against the dangerous enterovirus D68.

== History ==
Pleconaril was originally developed by Sanofi-Aventis, and licensed to ViroPharma in 1997. ViroPharma developed it further, and submitted a New Drug Application to the United States Food and Drug Administration (FDA) in 2001. The application was rejected, citing safety concerns; and ViroPharma re-licensed it to Schering-Plough in 2003. The Phase II clinical trial was completed in 2007. A pleconaril intranasal spray had reached phase II clinical trial for the treatment of the common cold symptoms and asthma complications. However, the results have yet to be reported.

== Mechanism of action ==
In enteroviruses, pleconaril prevents the virus from exposing its RNA, and in rhinoviruses pleconaril prevents the virus from attaching itself to the host cell. Human rhinoviruses (HRVs) contain four structural proteins labeled VP1-VP4. Proteins VP1, VP2 and VP3 are eight stranded anti-parallel β-barrels. VP4 is an extended polypeptide chain on the viral capsid inner surface. Pleconaril binds to a hydrophobic pocket in the VP1 protein. Pleconaril has been shown in viral assembly to associate with viral particles. Through noncovalent, hydrophobic interactions compounds can bind to the hydrophobic pocket. Amino acids in positions Tyr152 and Val191 are a part of the VP1 drug binding pocket.

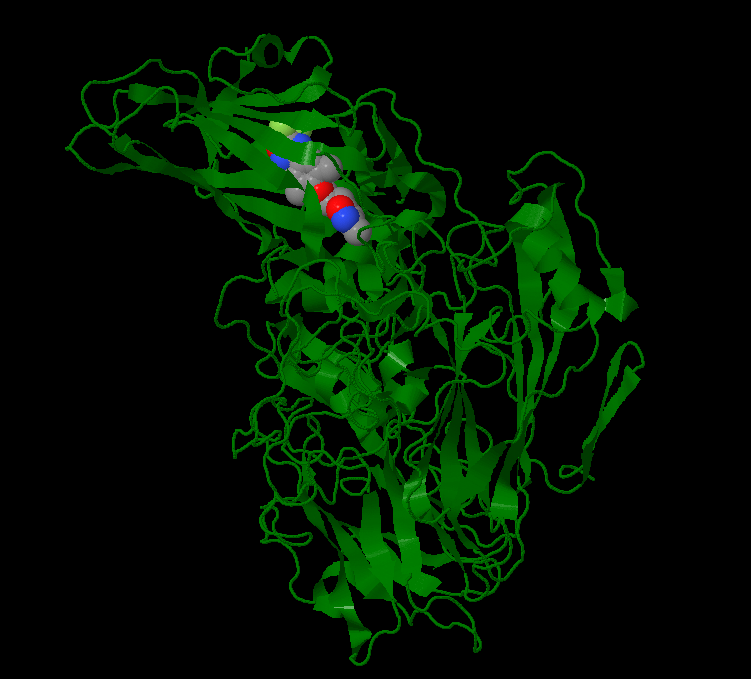
This image was created in JMOL showing the beta sheets and alpha helices of the Human Rhinovirus. The molecule embedded in the hydrophobic pocket of the VP1 protein is pleconaril.

In Coxsackievirus, pleconaril efficiency correlates to the susceptibility of CVB3 with the amino acid at position 1092 in the hydrophobic pocket. Amino acid 1092 is in close proximity to the central ring of capsid binders. The binding of pleconaril in the hydrophobic pocket creates conformational changes, which increases the rigidity of the virion and decreases the virions' ability to interact with its receptor. Drugs bind with the methylisoxazole ring close to the entrance pocket in VP1, the 3-fluromethyl oxadiazole ring at the end of the pocket and the phenyl ring in the center of the pocket.

== Clinical trials ==
The results of two randomized, double blind, placebo studies found Pleconaril treatment could benefit patients with colds due to picornaviruses. Participants in the studies were healthy adults from Canada and the United States, with self-diagnosed colds that had occurred within 24 hours of trial enrollment. Participants were randomly given a placebo or two 200 mg tablets to take three times daily for five days. To increase absorption it was recommended to be taken after a meal. To monitor the effectiveness of Pleconaril, participants recorded the severity of their symptoms and nasal mucosal samples were obtained at enrollment, day 3, day 6 and day 18. The two studies had a total of 2096 participants and more than 90% (1945) completed the trial. The most common reason for a participant not finishing the trial was an adverse event. Pleconaril treatment showed a reduction in nose blowing, sleep disturbance, and less cold medication used.

Another study showed over 87% of virus isolates in cell culture were inhibited by pleconaril. Virus variants were detected in 0.7% of the placebo group and 10.7% of the pleconaril group. Of the two isolates a subject from the placebo group had a resistant virus in cell culture to pleconaril. The other strain was susceptible to the drug. The pleconaril group had 21 virus strains, which remained susceptible. Resistance strains were found in 7 pleconaril patients.

A Phase II study that used an intranasal formulation of pleconaril failed to show a statistically significant result for either of its two primary efficacy endpoints, percentage of participants with rhinovirus PCR-positive colds and percentage of participants with asthma exacerbations together with rhinovirus-positive PCR.

== Resistance ==
In human rhinoviruses mutations in amino acids at positions 152 and 191 decrease the efficiency of pleconaril. The resistant HRV have phenylalanine at position 152 and leucine at position 191. In vitro studies have shown resistance to pleconaril may emerge. The wild type resistance frequency to pleconaril was about 5×10^{−5}. Coxsackievirus B3 (CVB3) strain Nancy and other mutants carry amino acid substitutions at position 1092 of Ile1092->Leu1092 or Ile1092->Met in VP1. The Ile->Leu mutation causes complete resistance to pleconaril. The study found resistance of CVB3 to pleconaril can be overcome by substitution of the central phenyl group. Methyl and bromine substitutions created an increase of pleconaril activity towards sensitive and resistant strains. Amino acid substitutions in the hydrophobic pocket and receptor binding region of viral capsid proteins were shown to have an effect against the sensitivity of capsid binding antivirals.

== Side effects ==
The U.S. Food and Drug Administration rejected pleconaril in 2002 due to the side effects. The most commonly reported side effects were mild to moderate headache, diarrhea, and nausea. Some women were having symptoms of spotting in between periods. Menstrual irregularities were reported by 3.5% of the 320 pleconaril treated women using oral contraceptives and by none of the 291 placebo treated women. In the clinical trial two women became pregnant due to the drug interfering with hormonal birth control by activation of cytochrome P-450 3A enzymes. Other patients have described painful nasal inflammation.

== See also ==
- Pocapavir
