= Kristala Jones Prather =

American chemical engineer

- Education: Massachusetts Institute of Technology; University of California, Berkeley
- Scientific career
- Workplaces: Massachusetts Institute of Technology
- Doctoral advisor: Jay Keasling
- Website: http://prathergroup.mit.edu/

Kristala Jones Prather is an American professor of chemical engineering at the Massachusetts Institute of Technology. Her research is focused on using novel bioprocesses to design recombinant microorganisms to produce small molecules.

== Early life and education ==
Prather was born in Cincinnati. She grew up in Longview, Texas. She was inspired to study chemical engineering by her physics and calculus teachers. She earned a Bachelor of Science from Massachusetts Institute of Technology in 1994, and a Ph.D at University of California, Berkeley, in 1999.

She has been involved with the National Society of Black Engineers and National Organization for the Professional Advancement of Black Chemists and Chemical Engineers.

== Research and career ==
Prather worked at BioProcess R&D and the Merck & Co. labs for four years, working on biocatalysis for the transformation of small molecules and mammalian cell lines for therapeutic proteins. This enabled her to produce drugs with biological processes rather than chemical reactions. She was appointed to the faculty of Massachusetts Institute of Technology in 2004. In 2009, her team created glucaric acid from Escherichia coli that contained enzymes from three organisms.

In 2014, she was appointed a Fellow at Radcliffe Institute for Advanced Study. In 2016, she was an investigator in the multi-institutional Synthetic Biology Engineering Research Center, as well as leader of the Prather lab. She specializes in retrobiosynthesis. These pathways use synthetic DNA that can be added to biological hosts. In 2018, she gave expert evidence to the National Academy of Sciences about vulnerabilities in biodefense.

Prather has won numerous awards for her research, including the Andreas Acrivos Award for Professional Progress from the American Institute of Chemical Engineering in 2021. She was named a Fellow of the American Association for the Advancement of Science in 2018.

In late 2023, Prather was appointed head of MIT's Department of Chemical Engineering.. She was elected to the National Academy of Engineering in 2025.

Prather is known for her teaching, mentoring, and advocacy. In 2016, she was profiled on Spellbound, how kids become scientists. In 2015, Prather served on the advisory board of the Woodrow Wilson International Center for Scholars SynBio Project. She has been involved with several initiatives to support MIT students of color.

== Selected publications ==
- Dinh C.V., Chen X., Prather K.L.J. (2020) Development of a Quorum-Sensing Based Circuit for Control of Coculture Population Composition in a Naringenin Production System. ACS Synth Biol.
- Doong S.J., Gupta A. and K.L.J. Prather (2018) Layered dynamic regulation for improving metabolic pathway productivity in Escherichia coli. Proc. Natl. Acad. Sci. U S A 115(12):2964-2969.
- Fox, K.J. and K.L.J. Prather. 2020. "Production of D-glyceric acid from D-galacturonate in Escherichia coli." J. Ind. Microbiol. Biotechnol. 47:1075–1081.

== Honors and awards ==
2005 - Office of Naval Research Young Investigator award

2007 - Technology Review "TR35" Young Innovator Award

2018 - Massachusetts Institute of Technology Seed Grant

2010 - National Science Foundation CAREER Award

2010 - Massachusetts Institute of Technology School of Engineering Junior Bose Award for Excellence in Teaching

2011 - Biochemical Engineering Journal Young Investigator Award

2012 - World Economic Forum Annual Meeting of the New Champions

2014 - Massachusetts Institute of Technology MacVicar Faculty Fellow

2017 - Society for Industrial Microbiology and Biotechnology Charles Thom Award

2017 - Martin Luther King Jr. Leadership Award

2018 - AAAS Fellow

2021 - Gordon Y. Billard Award

2021 - AIChE's Andreas Acrivos Award for Professional Progress in Chemical Engineering

2025 - Member of the National Academy of Engineering
