= Jay Keasling =

American biologist

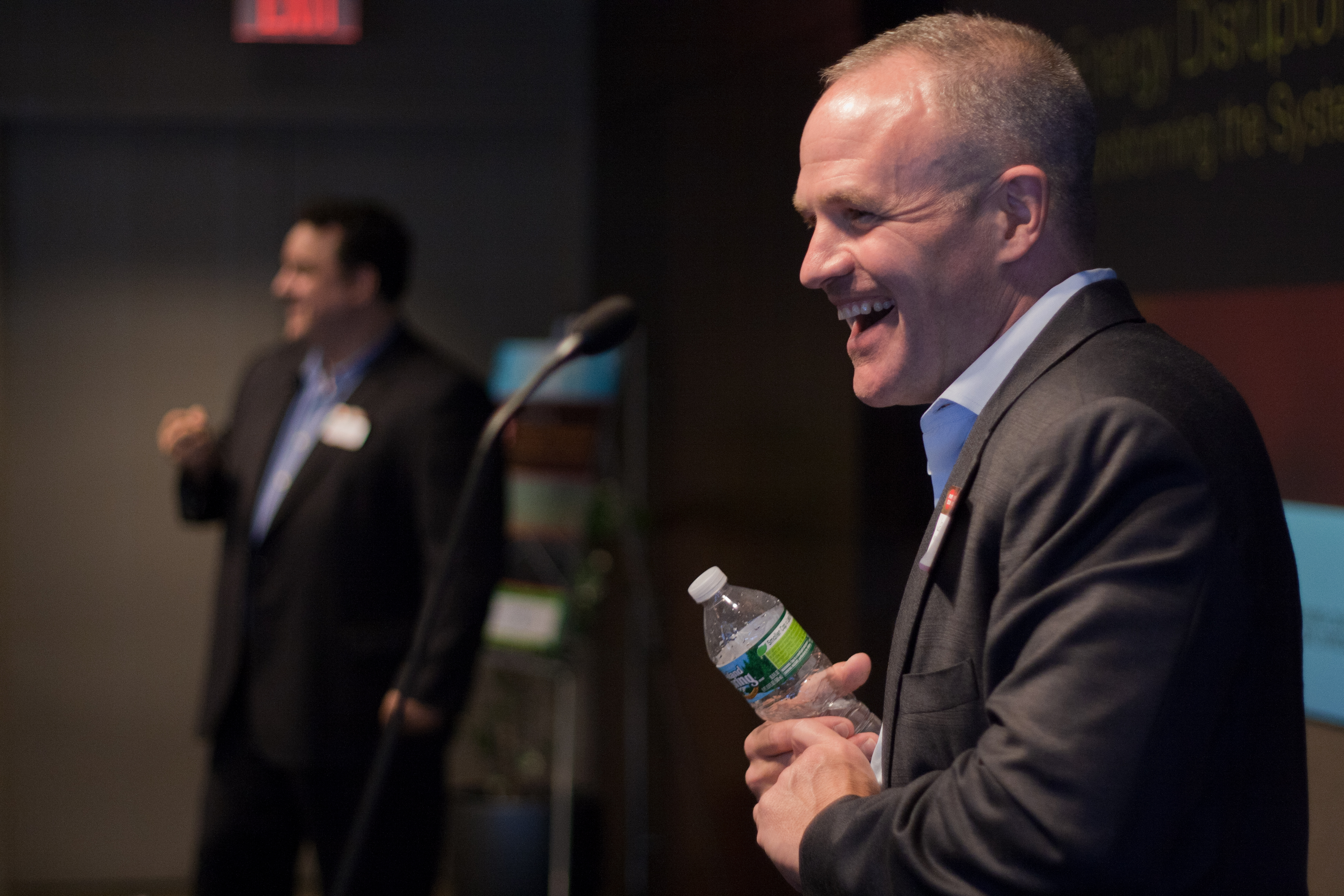
- Dr. Jay D. Keasling speaking at PopTech Energy Salon 2011 in New York City
- Education: University of Nebraska–Lincoln; University of Michigan
- Known for: metabolic engineering
- Awards: Bill & Melinda Gates Foundation grant, Heinz Award in Technology, the Economy & Employment
- Scientific career
- Workplaces: University of California, Berkeley, University of Nebraska–Lincoln, University of Michigan
- Thesis: Dynamics and control of bacterial plasmid replication (1991)
- Doctoral advisor: Bernhard Palsson
- Doctoral students: Kristala Jones Prather
- Other notable students: Michelle C. Chang
- Website: keaslinglab.lbl.gov twitter.com/jaykeasling

Jay D. Keasling is a professor of chemical engineering and bioengineering at the University of California, Berkeley. He is also associate laboratory director for biosciences at the Lawrence Berkeley National Laboratory and chief executive officer of the Joint BioEnergy Institute. He is considered one of the foremost authorities in synthetic biology, especially in the field of metabolic engineering.

Keasling was elected a member of the National Academy of Engineering in 2010 for developing synthetic biology tools to engineer the antimalarial drug artemisinin.

== Education ==
Keasling received his bachelor's degree at the University of Nebraska–Lincoln where he was a member of Delta Tau Delta International Fraternity. He went on to complete his Doctor of Philosophy degree at the University of Michigan in 1991 under the supervision of Bernhard Palsson. Keasling performed post-doctoral research with Arthur Kornberg at Stanford University in 1991–1992.

== Research ==
Keasling's current research is focused on metabolic engineering (engineering chemistry inside microorganisms) for production of chemicals and new uses of renewable resources, like sugar and cellulosic biomass. Keasling has also worked on genetic tool development (an area now known as synthetic biology). Keasling's laboratory has applied metabolic chemistry to a number of real-world problems including the production of the antimalarial drug artemisinin and drop-in biofuels. Keasling has published over 300 papers in peer-reviewed journals and has over 30 issued patents.

=== Artemisinin ===
Malaria is a global health problem that threatens 300–500 million people and kills more than one million people annually. The chloroquine-based drugs that were used widely in the past have lost effectiveness because the Plasmodium parasite that causes malaria has become resistant to them. Artemisinin, a sesquiterpene lactone endoperoxide, extracted from Artemisia annua L is highly effective against Plasmodium spp. resistant to other anti-malarial drugs. However, there are several problems with current production methods for artemisinin. First, artemisinin combination therapies (ACTs) are too expensive for people in the developing world to afford. Second, artemisinin is extracted from A. annua, and its yield and consistency depend on climate and the extraction process. While there is a method for chemical synthesis of artemisinin, it is too low yielding and therefore too expensive for use in producing low-cost drugs. Third, although the World Health Organization has recommended that artemisinin be formulated with other active pharmaceutical ingredients in ACTs, many manufacturers are still producing mono-therapies of artemisinin, which increase the chance that Plasmodium spp. will develop resistance to artemisinin.

Keasling's laboratory at the University of California, Berkeley, has engineered both Escherichia coli and Saccharomyces cerevisiae to produce artemisinic acid, a precursor to artemisinin that can be derivatized using established, simple, inexpensive chemistry to form artemisinin or any artemisinin derivative currently used to treat malaria. The microorganisms were engineered with a ten-enzyme biosynthetic pathway using genes from Artemisia annua, Saccharomyces cerevisiae, and Escherichia coli (twelve genes in all) to transform a simple and renewable sugar, like glucose, into the complicated chemical structure of the anti-malarial drug artemisinin. The engineered microorganism is capable of secreting the final product from the cell, thereby purifying it from all other intracellular chemicals and reducing the purification costs and therefore the cost of the final drug. Given the existence of known, relatively high-yielding chemistry for the conversion of artemisinic acid to artemisinin or any other artemisinin derivative, microbially-produced artemisinic acid is a viable, renewable, and scalable source of this potent family of anti-malarial drugs.

A critical element of Keasling's work was the development of genetic tools to aid in the manipulation of microbial metabolism, particularly for low-value products that require high yields from sugar.His laboratory developed single-copy plasmids for the expression of complex metabolic pathways, promoter systems that allow regulated control of transcription consistently in all cells of a culture, mRNA stabilization technologies to regulate the stability of mRNA segments, and a protein engineering approach to attach several enzymes of a metabolic pathway onto a synthetic protein scaffold to increase pathway flux. These and other gene expression tools now enable precise control of the expression of the genes that encode novel metabolic pathways to maximize chemical production, to minimize losses to side products, and minimize the accumulation of toxic intermediates that may poison the microbial host, all of which are important for economical production of this important drug.

Another critical aspect of Keasling's work was discovering the chemistry and enzymes in Artemisia annua responsible for synthesis of artemisinin. These enzymes included the cytochrome P450 that oxidizes amorphadiene to artemisinic acid and the redox partners that transfer reducing equivalents from the enzyme to cofactors. The discovery of these enzymes and their functional expression in both yeast and E. coli, along with the other nine enzymes in the metabolic pathway, allowed production of artemisinic acid by these two microorganisms. S. cerevisiae was chosen for the large-scale production process and was further engineered to improve artemisinic acid production.

Keasling's microbial production process has a number of advantages over extraction from plants. First, microbial synthesis will reduce the cost of artemisinin, the most expensive component of artemisinin-based combination therapies—by as much as tenfold—and therefore make artemisinin-derived anti-malarial drugs more affordable to people in the developing world. Second, weather conditions or political climates that might otherwise affect the yield or cost of the plant-derived version of the drug will not affect the microbial source for the drug. Third, microbial production of artemisinin in large tanks will allow for more careful distribution of artemisinin to legitimate drug manufacturers that formulate artemisinin combination therapies, rather than monotherapies. This will, in turn, slow the development of resistance to this drug. Fourth, severe shortages of plant-derived artemisinin are projected for 2011 and beyond, which will increase the cost of artemisinin combination therapies. Finally, microbially-derived artemisinic acid will enable production of new derivatives of artemisinin that Plasmodium may not be resistant to, thereby extending the time over which artemisinin may be used.

To ensure that the process he developed would benefit people in the developing world, Keasling assembled a unique team consisting of his laboratory at the University of California, Berkeley, Amyris Biotechnologies ( a company founded on this technology) and the Institute for OneWorld Health (a non-profit pharmaceutical company located in San Francisco). In addition to assembling the team, Keasling developed an intellectual property model to ensure that microbially-sourced artemisinin could be offered as inexpensively as possible to people in the developing world: patents granted from his work at UCB are licensed royalty free to Amyris Biotechnologies and the Institute for OneWorld Health for use in producing artemisinin so long as they do not make a profit on artemisinin sold in the developing world. The team was funded in December 2004 by the Bill & Melinda Gates Foundation to develop the microbial production process. The science was completed in December 2007. In 2008, Sanofi-Aventis licensed the technology and worked with Amyris to develop the production process. Sanofi-Aventis has produced 35 tons of artemisinin using Keasling’s microbial production process, which is enough for 70 million treatments. Distribution of artemisinin combination therapies containing the microbially-sourced artemisinin began in August 2014 with 1.7 million treatments shipped to Africa. It is anticipated that 100-150 million treatments will be produced using this technology and shipped annually to Africa, Asia and South America.

=== Biofuels ===
Renewable fuels are needed for all modes of transportation but most microbially-sourced fuels can be used only as a small fraction of gasoline in conventional spark-ignition engines. Keasling’s laboratory has engineered microorganisms to produce hydrocarbons with similar properties to the fuels now derived from petroleum. These fuels are synthesized from plant-derived sugars, such as cellulose feedstock, which is of little economic value. Consequently, microbes can minimize the carbon footprint by minimizing the energy expenditure in sourcing fuel, such off-shore drilling and hydraulic fracturing.

Keasling and his colleagues demonstrated that Escherichia coli and Saccharomyces cerevisiae can be engineered to produce the fatty acid-based biofuels fatty acid ethyl esters, alkenes, and methyl ketones. As linear hydrocarbons are the key components of diesel, these biologically produced fuels are excellent diesel replacements. However, fuels containing only long, linear, hydrocarbon chains will freeze under cold conditions. To develop fuels suitable for cold applications, Keasling's laboratory engineered E. coli and S. cerevisiae to produce branched and cyclic hydrocarbons using the isoprenoid biosynthetic pathway: isopentanol, a drop-in replacement for gasoline; pinene, a replacement for jet fuel; and bisabolene, a replacement for diesel fuel. Because isoprenoids add a methyl side chain every four carbons in the backbone, fuels made from isoprenoids have very low freeze and cloud points, making them suitable as cold-weather diesels and jet fuels.

One of the biggest challenges in scaling up microbial fermentations is the stability of the microbial strain: the engineered microorganism will attempt to mutate or shed the metabolic pathway, in part because intermediates in the metabolic pathway accumulate and are toxic to the cells. To balance pathway flux and reduce the cost of producing a desired biofuel, Keasling's laboratory developed dynamic regulators to sense the levels of intermediates in the pathway and regulate pathway activity. These regulators stabilized the pathway and the cell and improved biofuel yields making it possible to grow the engineered cells in large-scale fermentation tanks for fuel production.

Many of the best fuels and chemicals are toxic to the producer organism. One way to limit fuel toxicity is to actively pump the fuel from the cell. To identify pumps ideally suited for a particular fuel, Keasling and his colleagues bioprospected environmental microorganisms for many, different, three-component transporters and selected for the pumps most effective for a particular fuel. These transporters allowed E. coli to grow in the presence of the fuels and, as a result, produce more of the target fuel than it would have been able to do so in the absence of the transporter.

The starting materials (generally sugars) are the most significant factor in the biofuel production cost. Cellulose, a potentially low-cost starting material, must be depolymerized into sugars by adding an expensive cocktail of enzymes. One way to reduce this cost is to engineer the fuel-producing microbe to also produce the enzymes to depolymerize cellulose and hemicellulose. Recently, Keasling's laboratory demonstrated that a microorganism could be engineered to synthesize and secrete enzymes to depolymerize cellulose and hemicellulose into sugars and to produce a gasoline replacement (butanol), a diesel-fuel replacement (fatty acid ethyl ester), or a jet fuel replacement (pinene).

As a technological platform, biofuel manufacturing faces huge economic hurdles many of which depend on the market pricing of crude oil and other conventionally sourced fuels. Nonetheless, metabolic engineering is a technology that is becoming increasingly competitive and is expected to have wide-reaching effects by 2020.

== Awards ==
- CAREER Award, National Science Foundation, 1995
- AIChE Award for Chemical Engineering Excellence in Academic Teaching, Northern California Section of the American Institute for Chemical Engineers, 1999
- Elected Fellow of the American Institute of Medical and Biological Engineering, 2000
- Technology Pioneer, World Economic Forum, 2005
- Scientist of the Year, Discover magazine, 2006.
- Research Project of the Year, Northern California Section of the American Institute for Chemical Engineers, 2007
- Elected Fellow of the American Academy for Microbiology, 2007
- Professional Progress Award, American Institute for Chemical Engineers, 2007
- Visionary Award, Bay Bio, 2007
- Sierra Section Recognition for Leadership in the Chemical Engineering Profession, American Institute of Chemical Engineers – Northern California Section, 2008
- Chancellor's Award for Public Service for Research in the Public Interest, University of California, Berkeley, 2009
- Inaugural Biotech Humanitarian Award, Biotechnology Industry Organization (BIO), 2009
- LGBTQ Engineer of the Year, National Organization of Gay and Lesbian Scientists and Technical Professionals, 2010
- National Academy of Engineering, 2010
- Presidential Green Chemistry Challenge Award, United States Environmental Protection Agency, 2010
- International Metabolic Engineering Award, Metabolic Engineering Society, 2012
- 18th Annual Heinz Award for Technology, the Economy and Employment, Heinz Family Foundation, 2012
- Marvin J. Johnson Award in Microbial and Biochemical Technology, Division of Biochemical Technology, American Chemical Society, 2013
- Promega Biotechnology Research Award, American Society for Microbiology, 2013
- George Washington Carver Award for Innovation in Industrial Biotechnology, Biotechnology Industry Organization, 2013
- Food, Pharmaceutical and Bioengineering Division Award, Food, Pharmaceutical and Bioengineering Division, American Institute of Chemical Engineers, 2013
- Eni Renewable Energy Prize, Eni S.p.A., 2014
- Innovator Award – Biosciences, Economist magazine, 2014
- National Academy of Inventors, 2014
- Innovator of the Year Award, US Department of Energy Office of Technology/National Academy of Inventors, 2025

== Companies ==
Keasling is a founder of Amyris (with Vincent Martin, Jack Newman, Neil Renninger and Kinkead Reiling), LS9 (now part of REG with George Church and Chris Sommerville), and Lygos (with Leonard Katz, Clem Fortman, Jeffrey Dietrich and Eric Steen).

== Personal life ==
Keasling is originally from Harvard, Nebraska, and is openly gay.

== See also ==
- LGBT people in science
