= Othmar Purtscher =

Austrian ophthalmologist

Othmar Purtscher (18 October 1852, Schwaz – 12 December 1927, Klagenfurt) was an Austrian ophthalmologist.

In 1876 he received his medical doctorate from the University of Innsbruck, where he was a student of Ludwig Mauthner. Following graduation he continued his education in Paris, London, Berlin and Vienna, where he studied with Carl Ferdinand von Arlt and Ernst Fuchs. In 1880 he settled in Klagenfurt, where he subsequently became chief surgeon of an ophthalmic clinic.

He made contributions in his investigations on the effects of copper in the eye, of erythropsia (distortion of color vision in which objects acquire an unusual reddish hue), and on traumatic angiopathy of the retina, a condition known as "Purtscher's retinopathy".

== Selected works ==
- Ein Fall von Erythropsie nach Cataracta traumatica, 1881.
- Zur Frage der Erythropsie Aphakischer. 1883.
- Weitere Beiträge zur Frage der Erythropsie, 1885.
- Angiopathia retinae traumatica. Lymphorrhagien des Augengrundes, v. Graefes Arch. Ophthal., 82, 347-71, 1912 (Purtscher's retinopathy described).
- Ein interessantes Kennzeichen der Anwesenheit von Kupfer im Glaskörper, 1918.
