= Pocapavir =

Antiviral drug

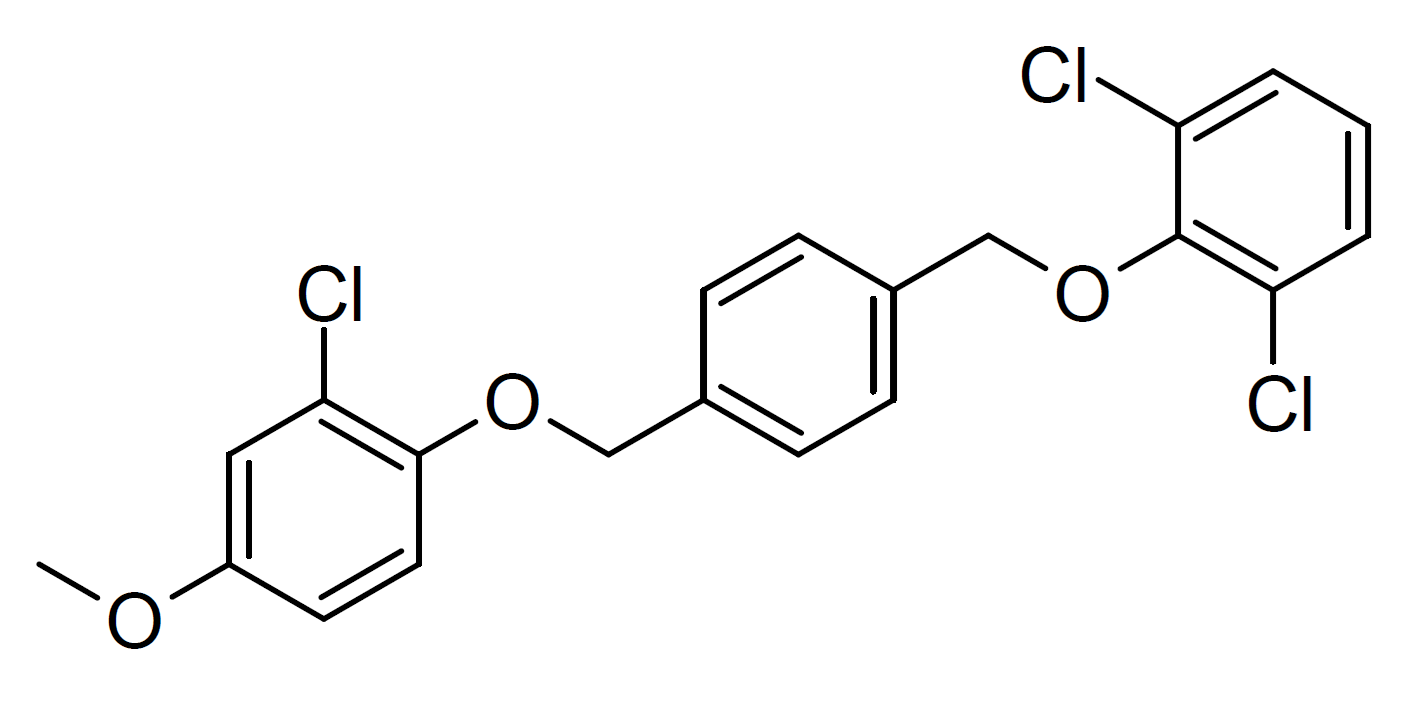

Clinical data
- Other names: V-073

Identifiers
- IUPAC name: 1,3-dichloro-2-{[4-[(2-chloro-4-methoxyphenoxy)methyl]phenyl]methoxy}benzene
- CAS Number: 146949-21-5
- PubChem CID: 1455
- DrugBank: DB17736
- UNII: 4ILA3VOV97
- ChEMBL: ChEMBLCHEMBL1235858
- CompTox Dashboard (EPA): DTXSID00163548

Chemical and physical data
- Formula: C_{21}H_{17}Cl_{3}O_{3}
- Molar mass: 423.71 g·mol^{−1}
- 3D model (JSmol): Interactive image
- SMILES: COC1=CC(=C(C=C1)OCC2=CC=C(C=C2)COC3=C(C=CC=C3Cl)Cl)Cl
- InChI: InChI=1S/C21H17Cl3O3/c1-25-16-9-10-20(19(24)11-16)26-12-14-5-7-15(8-6-14)13-27-21-17(22)3-2-4-18(21)23/h2-11H,12-13H2,1H3; Key:XXMDDBVNWRWNCW-UHFFFAOYSA-N

Pocapavir (V-073, SCH48973) is an antiviral drug which acts as a capsid inhibitor. It was developed for the treatment of enterovirus infections, including diseases such as polio and coxsackievirus, and also has activity against parechoviruses.

== See also ==
- Pleconaril
- Rupintrivir
