= Progressive outer retinal necrosis =

- Other names: Varicella zoster virus retinitis (VZVR),
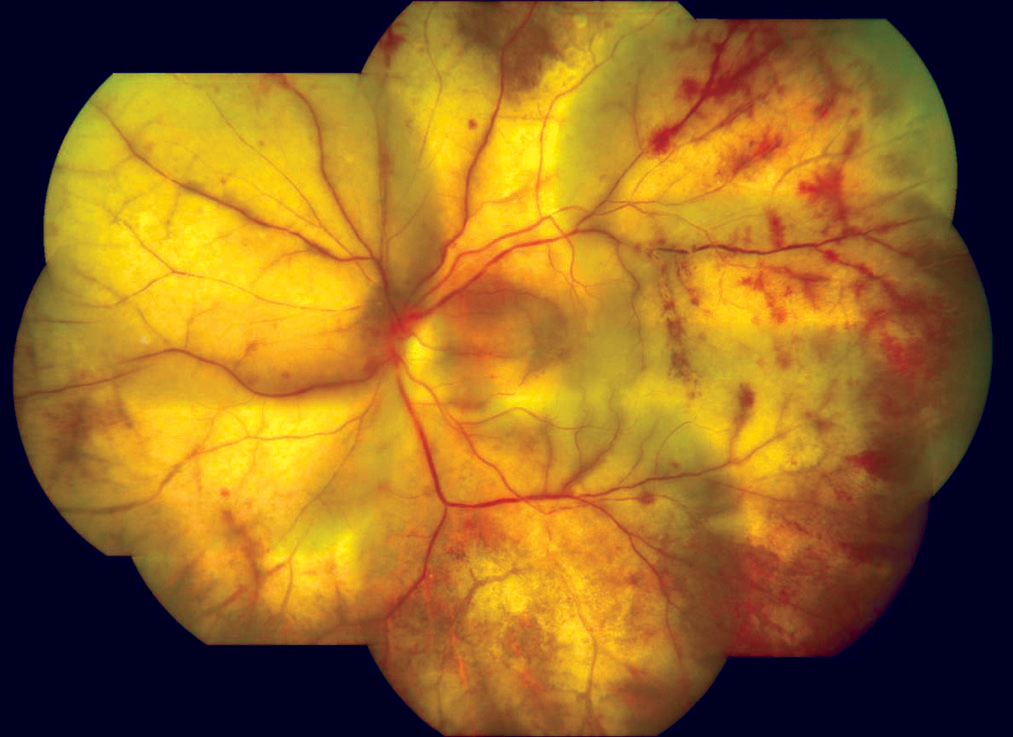
- The typical "cracked mud" appearance of the fundus in progressive outer retinal necrosis
- Specialty: Ophthalmology, infectious diseases

Progressive outer retinal necrosis (PORN) syndrome is a form of chorioretinitis, an infection in the retina, the back of the eye. The disease is most commonly caused by the varicella zoster virus and is found almost exclusively in patients with HIV/AIDS (acquired immunodeficiency syndrome). Progressive outer retinal necrosis is the second most common opportunistic retinal infection in North America among people with AIDS. The reason this disease process is considered opportunistic is precisely because it only presents in patients with AIDS, a disease that attacks and weakens the immune system, making space for other infections, like Varicella zoster virus (VZV) and Herpes simplex virus (HSV), to attack the body.

The syndrome, PORN, falls under the umbrella of necrotizing herpetic retinopathy, along with Acute retinal necrosis. Although fairly similar processes, the two forms of retinopathy have different presenting symptoms. Acute Retinal Necrosis, or ARN, is damage more central in the retinal portion of the eye with dead or necrotic areas well defined. ARN also presents with inflammation within the eye and is often painful. PORN is a chorioretinitis presenting with multiple lesions in the peripheral retina. Unlike ARN, this disease process has no signs of intraocular inflammation, the hallmark feature, or vascular involvement.

== Presentation ==
The presentation of the disease is dependent on the patient's AIDS prognosis. If the immune system has been significantly weakened by AIDS, a patient will likely present with worse and faster progressing PORN. Commonly presenting symptoms of PORN include:

- Blurry vision
- Acute onset bilateral visual loss OR painless progressive visual loss
- Decreased vision with pain
- Floaters
- Headaches

== Diagnosis ==
The diagnosis of Progressive outer retinal necrosis (PORN) syndrome is made primarily through history and physical exam. A patient's medical history of AIDS increases the likelihood of PORN as the diagnosis. An eye exam will show specific hallmark features, including opacified lesions in the peripheral retina without inflammation.

There are medical tests that can aid in diagnosing the severity of the disease process, however are not necessary for initial diagnosis.

- Imaging studies: may help diagnose the extent of retinal involvement
- Optical coherence tomography (OCT): this test allows ophthalmologists to look at outer and inner layers of the retina
- Fundus autofluorescence: shows areas of unhealthy cells in the retina
- Blood work: the labs can show how immuno-compromised an individual is
- Vitreous Tap: Analysis of the fluid in the eye can show the causative organism, such as VZV.

Other possible diseases to consider when a patient presents with symptoms similar to PORN include: CMV retinitis, ARN, Syphilitic retinitis, Toxoplasma retinochoroiditis, tuberculosis, toxocariasis, fungal or bacterial endophthalmitis Inflammatory: Sarcoidosis, Behcet's, other retinal vasculitides, Neoplastic: intraocular lymphoma, leukemia, metastasis.

== Treatment ==
When AIDS first became a diagnosis, ophthalmologists began seeing patients with infectious processes such as Progressive outer retinal necrosis (PORN). With the use of HAART (3 drug regimen standard) treatment for HIV/AIDS in the 1990s, the presentation of these chorioretinitis diseases became less severe and less frequent.

Treatment for Necrotizing Herpetic Retinopathy, including ARN and PORN, includes the anti-viral medications Ganciclovir and Foscarnet. These medications are given as intra-vitreal injections (injected into the fluid of the eye). This treatment has shown success in reversing the disease process and improving vision to an extent.

== Prognosis ==
If left untreated, PORN syndrome can become bilateral, affecting both eyes. The retina can also atrophy, or decay, over time as the blood supply decreases. This leads to retinal detachment, a process where the retina breaks off the back of the eye. Retinal detachments are considered surgical emergencies, as they can lead to blindness if not promptly fixed.

== See also ==
- Cytomegalovirus retinitis
- List of systemic diseases with ocular manifestations
