= HIV retinopathy =

Eye disease in HIV/AIDS

HIV Retinopathy
- Other names: AIDS retinopathy, HIV microvasculopathy or Noninfectious retinal microvasculopathy
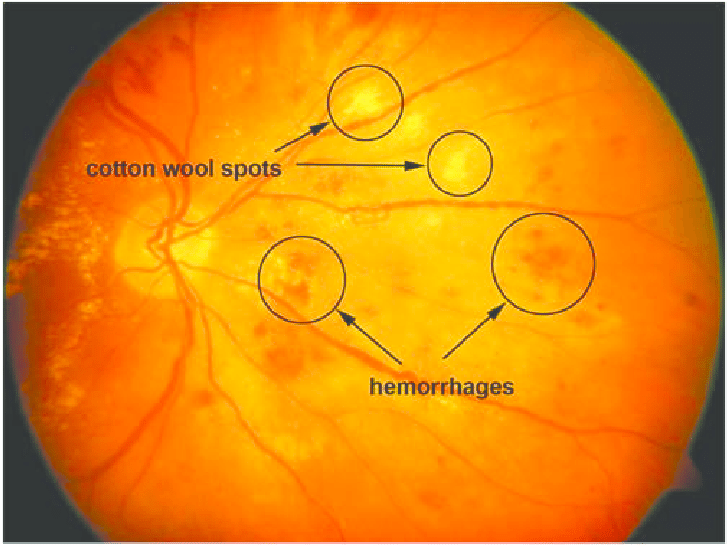
- A sample retinal image (not from HIV Retinopathy) with cotton wool spots and hemorrhages
- Specialty: Ophthalmology
- Symptoms: Cotton wool spots, retinal hemorrhages
- Complications: Blindness
- Causes: HIV/AIDS
- Diagnostic method: Eye examination
- Differential diagnosis: CMV retinitis
- Treatment: Treatment for HIV/AIDS

HIV retinopathy, also known as AIDS retinopathy, HIV microvasculopathy or Noninfectious retinal microvasculopathy, is an eye condition associated with HIV infection. It is characterized by damage to the small blood vessels in the retina. While asymptomatic during initial stages, it may lead to vision loss if HIV/AIDS is not properly managed.

Human immunodeficiency virus (HIV) is a retrovirus that attacks the immune system of the human body. HIV attacks and destroys CD4 T cells, the central mediators of immune response in humans, leading to a weakened immune response and increased susceptibility to infections and diseases. HIV/AIDS related eye diseases are common among people living with this disease worldwide. Among these diseases, HIV retinopathy is the most common condition. This condition is seen in 40% to 60% of HIV positive patients. It is the most common cause of loss of vision in these patients.

== Signs and symptoms ==
HIV retinopathy is usually asymptomatic. The lack of symptoms can often help distinguish HIV retinopathy from other ophthalmic complications seen in AIDS such as infectious retinitis.

The most common sign seen in HIV retinopathy is oncotic lesions in the retinal nerve fiber layer, known as cotton wool spots. These feathery white spots seen around the posterior pole of the retina may vary in size from 150 to 350 microns. Retinal hemorrhages (bleeding from small blood vessels) and microaneurysms are the other signs that may seen in retina.

HIV retinopathy, in its early stages, usually does not affect vision in a way that is noticeable to the patient. But, if HIV/AIDS is not treated or treatment is delayed HIV Retinopathy may lead to permanent visual loss.

=== Complications ===
In addition to affecting vision, HIV Retinopathy can cause subclinical visual field loss in HIV/AIDS patients. It is also said that HIV retinopathy increases the risk of Cytomegalovirus infection in the retina due to the breakdown of the blood-retinal barrier.

== Pathophysiology ==
HIV retinopathy is a microvasculopathy that may occur due to immune complex deposition, increased plasma viscosity, opportunistic infections and invasion of vascular endothelium by HIV, local release of cytotoxic factors, or rheologic abnormalities.

== Diagnosis ==
Diagnosis is mainly by eye examination in HIV patients. Signs of retinopathy can be diagnosed using ophthalmoscopy, dilated fundus examination, or fundus photography. Its prevalence is inversely proportional to the CD4 T cell count. CD4 count is measured using laboratory blood test by flow cytometry.

=== Differential diagnosis ===
Another condition seen in AIDS patients that is similar to HIV retinopathy, but less common than this is CMV retinitis. Early signs of CMV retinitis may resemble cotton-wool spots, but with close observation over several weeks, CMV retinitis can be seen to enlarge while the cotton-wool spots fade.

== Treatment ==
HIV Retinopathy itself is usually asymptomatic and does not require any treatment, but treatment for AIDS is important. HIV Retinopathy was a very common cause of blindness in people with AIDS before the introduction of highly active antiretroviral therapy, but its incidence is declining due to proper and timely management of AIDS. Even if there is signs of Retinopathy, it may reverse as the CD4 T cell count increase. Reversal of HIV retinopathy is a helpful sign of positive response to antiretroviral therapy in AIDS patients. But if HIV treatment is delayed it may lead to permanent visual loss.

Occurrence of HIV retinopathy may also be an indicator of therapeutic failure in AIDS patients undergoing treatment.

== Prevalence ==
HIV Retinopathy may seen in any individuals with HIV infection or AIDS, regardless age, sex, race or ethnic groups. HIV retinopathy is the most common cause of loss of vision in HIV/AIDS patients. In a study in HIV-infected patients, the presence of retinopathy was noted in 66% of patients with category C disease, 40% of patients in category B, 1% of patients in category A, and 0% in HIV-negative homosexual men. Its prevalence is inversely proportional to the CD4 T cell count.

== History ==
Ocular involvement in AIDS infection, as the form of cotton wool spots, CMV retinitis and Kaposi's sarcoma, was first described in 1982, by Gary Holland, then an ophthalmology resident at the Jules Stein Eye Institute at UCLA, in the American Journal of Ophthalmology. In 1996, Tay-Kearney and Jabs classified the ocular complications of HIV infection into five broad categories, HIV retinopathy, opportunistic ocular infections, ocular adnexal neoplasms, neuro-ophthalmic lesions, and drug-induced manifestations.
