= Jerome Schultz =

American bioengineer

- Education: Columbia University (BS) (MS); University of Wisconsin (PhD)
- Occupations: Bioengineer and Professor

Jerome Schultz is an American bioengineering researcher, professor, and university administrator. He is a fellow of several national scientific societies and a member of the National Academy of Engineering. He has held professorships at the University of Michigan, the University of Pittsburgh, University of California, Riverside, and he is currently a Distinguished Professor of Biomedical Engineering at the University of Houston.

== Education ==
Schultz graduated from the Columbia University School of Engineering with a B.S. in Chemical Engineering in 1954. He then received a M.S. in Chemical Engineering in 1956 from the same school. He then joined the Biochemistry Department at the University of Wisconsin, where he earned his doctorate in 1958.

== Early career ==
Following the completion of his PhD, Schultz worked for six years at the Lederle Laboratories, where he was Director of the Fermentation Pilot Unit in the Research Division. His responsibility included piloting the development of new antibiotics, enzymes, and steroids. Following his tenure at the laboratory he took on a professorship with the Department of Chemical Engineering at the University of Michigan. In his first few years his research focused on applied microbiology, biomaterials, and carrier-mediated membrane separations—then later he studied diffusion through nanoporous membranes, the development of the first optical biosensor for glucose, and the evaluation of biomaterials for NIH's artificial heart program. Between 1977 and 1985 he served as chair of the department.

== University of Pittsburgh ==
Jerome Schultz joined the University of Pittsburgh in 1987 as Director of the interdisciplinary Center for Bioengineering and Biotechnology. He also founded a new Department of Bioengineering and served as its first chairman. In 1988 he became Editor-in-Chief of journal Biotechnology Progress, which he served on for several decades. He was also a founding fellow and past president of the American Institute of Medical and Biological Engineering. He also arranged the first meeting of American Institute for Medical and Biological Engineering in 1992. Schultz continued his work on biosensors to develop a concept for the first implantable optically based glucose sensor. In 1994 Schultz was elected a member of the National Academy of Engineering “for integration of biological membrane transport and molecular recognition mechanisms for practical separation devices and bioanalytical sensors.” During his tenure at the University of Pittsburgh he was awarded the Marvin J. Johnson Biotechnology Award, American Chemical Society, which wrote that his work contributed to "bridging the gap between biochemical and biomedical engineering”. In 1997 Schultz also became a Fellow of the American Association for the Advancement of Science. Schultz has additionally served over the years as the chair of the American Institute of Chemical Engineers’ Food, Pharmaceutical and Bioengineering Division and the American Chemical Society's Biochemical Technology Division. He has also served at the National Science Foundation.

== Later career ==
In 2004 he moved to the University of California, Riverside to found and Chair a new Department of Bioengineering. The following year in 2005 Schultz became a Fellow of the Biomedical Engineering Society. In 2008 the AICHE, in celebrating its centennial, has recognized Schultz’ contributions by naming him one of the “One Hundred Engineers of the Modern Era” in the category of “New Frontiers” He was cited for his work with biorecognition and bioreceptor sensors, synthetic membranes, transport in tissues, immobilized enzymes, and pharmacokinetics. In 2013 he became a Fellow of the American Chemical Society as well as the American Institute of Chemical Engineers. In 2017 he was recruited to his current position as the University of Houston as the Distinguished Professor of Biomedical Engineering.

== Books ==
- Recent developments in separation science, N.N. Li, J.S. Dranoff, J.S. Schultz, P. Somasundaran, Co Editors, Vol. 5 (1979), CRC Press, West Palm Beach, Florida.
- Bioengineering food, R.L. Opila and J.S. Schultz, ed., Chem. Eng. Symposium Ser. No. 86, Vol. 64, (1968).
- Handbook of Chemical and Biological Sensors. R.F. Taylor and J.S. Schultz. Eds. Institute of Physics, Philadelphia. 1996 604pp.
- Biosensing, International Research and Development. J. Schultz, J. Mrksich, S. Bhatia, D. Brady, A. Ricco, D. Walt, and C. Wilkins. Eds. 387 pp (2006) Springer
