= Foscarnet =

Chemical compound

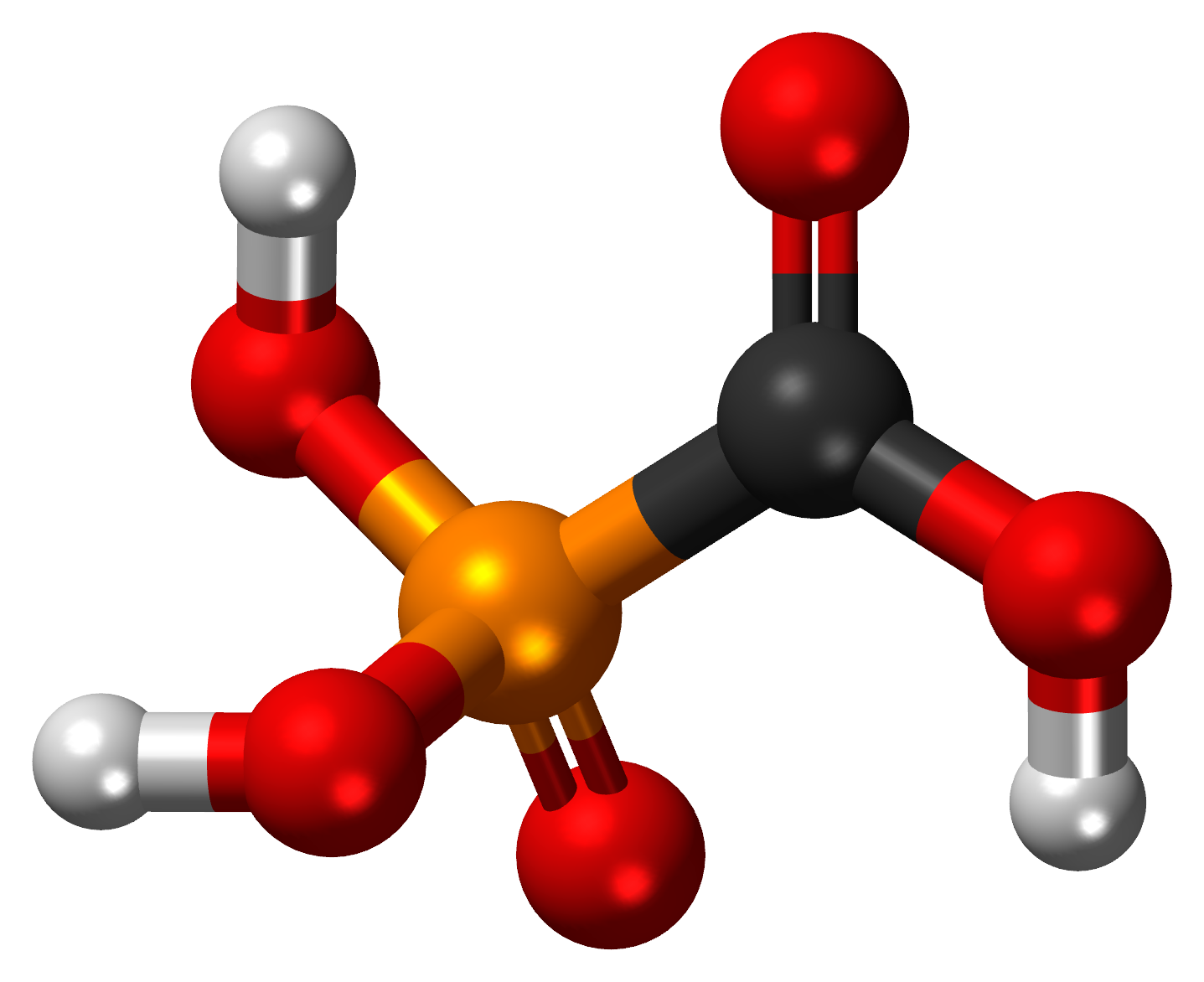

Clinical data
- Trade names: Foscavir, Vocarvi, others
- Other names: phosphonomethanoic acid, dihydroxyphosphinecarboxylic acid oxide
- AHFS/Drugs.com: Monograph
- MedlinePlus: a601144
- License data: US DailyMed: Foscarnet
- Pregnancy category: AU: B3
- Routes of administration: Intravenous
- ATC code: J05AD01 (WHO)

Legal status
- Legal status: AU: S4 (Prescription only); CA: ℞-only; UK: POM (Prescription only); US: ℞-only

Pharmacokinetic data
- Bioavailability: NA
- Protein binding: 14–17%
- Elimination half-life: 3.3–6.8 hours

Identifiers
- IUPAC name: phosphonoformic acid
- CAS Number: 4428-95-9 (trisodium salt)
- PubChem CID: 3415
- IUPHAR/BPS: 5497
- DrugBank: DB00529
- ChemSpider: 3297
- UNII: 364P9RVW4X
- KEGG: D00579; D02267
- ChEBI: CHEBI:127780
- ChEMBL: ChEMBL666
- CompTox Dashboard (EPA): DTXSID0048478

Chemical and physical data
- Formula: CH_{3}O_{5}P
- Molar mass: 126.004 g·mol^{−1}
- 3D model (JSmol): Interactive image
- SMILES: O=C(O)P(=O)(O)O
- InChI: InChI=1S/CH3O5P/c2-1(3)7(4,5)6/h(H,2,3)(H2,4,5,6); Key:ZJAOAACCNHFJAH-UHFFFAOYSA-N

Foscarnet (phosphonomethanoic acid), known by its brand name Foscavir, is an antiviral medication which is primarily used to treat viral infections involving the Herpesviridae family. It is classified as a pyrophosphate analog DNA polymerase inhibitor. Foscarnet is the conjugate base of a chemical compound with the formula HO_{2}CPO_{3}H_{2} (Trisodium phosphonoformate).

Foscarnet was approved for medical use in 1991. It is available as a generic medication.

== Medical use ==
This phosphonic acid derivative (marketed by Clinigen as foscarnet sodium under the trade name Foscavir) is an antiviral medication used to treat herpes viruses, including drug-resistant cytomegalovirus (CMV) and herpes simplex viruses types 1 and 2 (HSV-1 and HSV-2). It is particularly used to treat CMV retinitis. Foscarnet can be used to treat highly treatment-experienced patients with HIV as part of salvage therapy.

In cases of herpes simplex encephalitis where the HSV is resistant to acyclovir, the addition of foscarnet may be considered for off-label use.

== Mechanism of action ==
Foscarnet is a structural mimic of the anion pyrophosphate that selectively inhibits the pyrophosphate binding site on viral DNA polymerases at concentrations that do not affect human DNA polymerases.

In individuals treated with the DNA polymerase inhibitors acyclovir or ganciclovir, HSV or CMV particles can develop mutant protein kinases (thymidine kinase or UL97 protein kinase, respectively) that make them resistant to these antiviral drugs. However, unlike acyclovir and ganciclovir, foscarnet is not activated by viral protein kinases, making it useful in acyclovir- or ganciclovir-resistant HSV and CMV infections.

However, acyclovir- or ganciclovir-resistant mutants with alterations in viral DNA polymerase may also be resistant to foscarnet.

== Administration ==
Foscarnet is administered by intravenous infusion or intravitreous injection. The medication has low oral bioavailability.

== Side effects ==
- Nephrotoxicity — increase in serum creatinine levels and renal injury can occur in patients receiving foscarnet. Other nephrotoxic drugs should be avoided. Nephrotoxicity is usually reversible and can be reduced by dosage adjustment and adequate hydration.
- Electrolyte disturbances — hypocalcemia and hypomagnesemia can occur and regular monitoring of electrolytes is necessary to avoid clinical toxicity.
- Genital ulceration — a less common reported side effect which occurs more in men and usually during induction use of foscarnet. It is most likely a contact dermatitis due to high concentrations of foscarnet in urine. It usually resolves rapidly following discontinuation of the drug.
- CNS — less common side effects of perioral paresthesia, irritability and altered mental states.

== Sources ==
- Dennis L. Kasper, Eugene Braunwald. "Harrison's Manual of Medicine", 16th Edition, Mcgraw-hill, (2005), p. 2244.
