= Cotton wool spots =

Medical condition of the eye

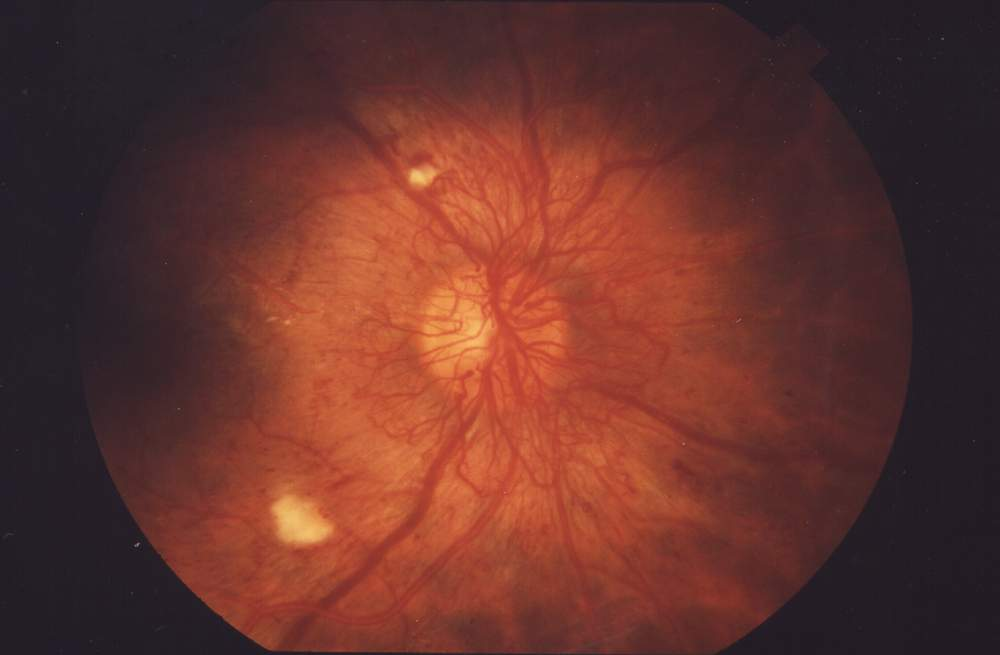
An ophthalmoscopic view of the retina showing advanced signs of diabetic retinopathy including two pale cotton wool spots.

Cotton wool spots are opaque fluffy white patches on the retina of the eye that are considered an abnormal finding during a funduscopic exam (also called an ophthalmoscopic exam). Cotton wool spots are typically a sign of another disease state, most common of which is diabetic retinopathy. The irregularly shaped white patches are a result of ischemia, or reduced blood flow and oxygen, in the retinal nerve fiber layer, which is located in the distribution of the capillaries of the superficial layer of the retina. These areas with reduced blood flow reflect the obstruction of axoplasmic flow due to mechanical or vascular causes and the consequential accumulation as a result of decreased axonal transport. This reduced axonal transport can then cause swelling or bulging on the surface layer of the retina, increasing the potential for nerve fiber damage.

The presence of cotton wool spots may resolve independently over time, typically in 4–12 weeks, or may depend on the underlying disease causing the condition. Diagnosis and treatment of the underlying disease state may be beneficial in the treatment and management of cotton wool spots.

== Signs and symptoms ==
Cotton wool spots present as opaque fluffy white spots, sometimes with feather-like edges, on the retina when seen on a funduscopic exam. These opaque white areas are typically asymptomatic, but may cause some vision loss due to the underlying disease state. Cotton wool spots are a retinal condition that when present, frequently act as a significant indicator, or sign, of a variety of underlying disease states. These fluffy white spots are often accompanied by additional abnormal funduscopic findings such as intraretinal bleeds, hard exudates, and atypical small blood vessels, including obstructed or dilated blood vessels and microaneurysms. These associated findings are common due to the underlying diseases causing these manifestations seen in the eyes. Because of the use of cotton wool spots more as an indicator of other systemic diseases, Mcleod had proposed that the taxonomy of the terms 'cotton wool spot' should be changed to something else to help better understand its true meaning.

== Pathophysiology ==
Cotton wool spots are commonly caused by changes to the retina secondary to diabetes, hypertension, or blockages to blood vessels to the retina, such as central retinal vein occlusion. While at one point believed to have been the result of nerve damage in the retina, interruptions to axoplasmic flow to these nerves may result from organelle accumulation in the axons. This is further purported by the presence of cytoid bodies in ganglion axon cells, where the accumulation of white blood cells, more specifically, eosinophils, mitochondria, and other cellular material lead to swelling of the ganglion axon cells which then lead to cotton wool spots.

== Causes ==
Referred to as a form of retinal myopathies, cotton wools spots are commonly found to be a secondary manifestation to diseases like diabetes, hypertension, and AIDS. Cotton wool spots have become one of the hallmarks of pre-proliferative diabetic retinopathy, a condition caused by damaged blood vessels in the retina due to high blood sugar. Abundant cotton wool spots are also found in hypertensive retinopathy, including malignant hypertension, where the white patches are a result of a microvascular infarct, or a sudden occlusion of the arteriole. One study observed the presence of cotton wool spots in people with acute leukemia, referring to the increase in white blood cells as a probable cause. Although cotton wool spots are a secondary manifestation to leukemia, they have been found to be a poor prognostic sign for survival in acute leukemia.

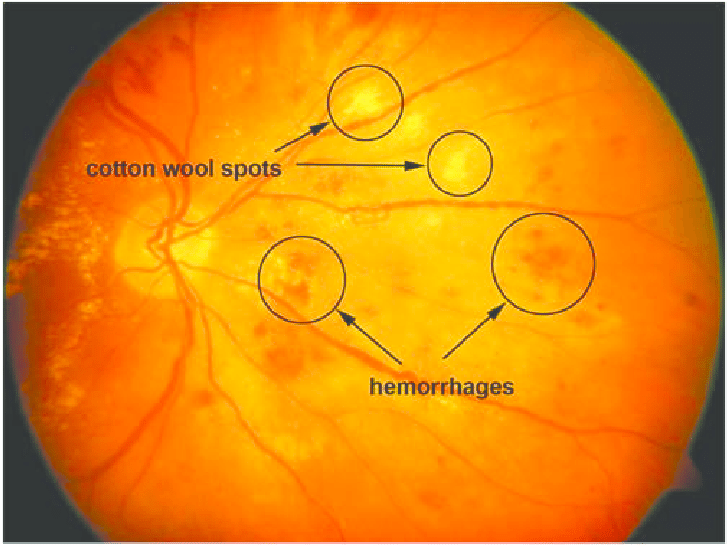
Diabetic retinopathy occurs when long standing diabetes begins to damage blood vessels in the eyes which leads to leakages in the eyes, known as hemorrhages and the appearance of yellow-white spots known as cotton wool spots.

More recently, prolonged travel in space has been found to be a probable cause of cotton wool spots in people who experience ocular changes after coming back from space. Although infrequent, conditions like HIV Retinopathy and Purtscher's retinopathy can also lead to the appearance of cotton wool spots. Although they are associated with multiple systemic diseases, it is possible for there to be an unknown etiology that would require further investigation. Cotton wool spots have different clinical characteristics when present as a result of HIV rather than in systemic diseases, like diabetes or hypertension, due to the viral complexes that cause structural changes to the retinal microvasculature.

Cotton wool spots are also associated with giant cell arteritis (GCA), a type of inflammation of the lining of the arteries, as this may reduce blood flow to the eyes. In a study of 123 subjects with vision loss due to early stage giant cell arteritis, one-third of subjects had cotton wool spots present in their eyes. Furthermore, because giant cell arteritis can lead to loss of vision and is associated with cotton wool spots, it is recommended to investigate for giant cell arteritis if cotton wool spots are found.

Another condition in which cotton wool spots are found is central retinal vein occlusion as a result of reduced blood flow from retinal arteriole obstruction.

A study conducted at Wills Eye Hospital in Pennsylvania found that a potential side effect of medications like macitentan, an endothelin receptor antagonist that is used to treat pulmonary arterial hypertension, can be bilateral cotton wool spots. As such, if a person develops cotton wool spots after starting an endothelin receptor antagonist, medication side effect should be considered as a plausible cause.

=== Possible causes ===
==== Cladribine ====
While still an ongoing and recent investigation, cladribine use can also be associated with the development of cotton wool spots. Cladribine, also known by its brand name Mavenclad, is a purine antimetabolite and antineoplastic drug used to reduce relapse rates and slow down disease progression for people with relapsing forms of multiple sclerosis in those who have not benefitted from or were unable to use other drugs multiple sclerosis. In a case study of a 39-year-old female with a history of relapsing forms of multiple sclerosis, after four years of using fingolimod (also known by its brand name Gilenya), another drug used to treat relapsing forms of multiple sclerosis, she was switched to cladribine. On day five of her second cycle of cladribine, she reported a shadow in her right eye, of which on day seven during an eye exam a cotton wool spot was found in the same eye. Six weeks after completing the second cycle of cladribine, the reported cotton wool spot was still present albeit reduced in size. At the 12-week mark, her vision returned to normal and the cotton wool spot was undetectable after 10 months. The study postulates the possibility that cladribine use may cause cotton wool spots due to its side effects of lymphopenia, neutropenia, thrombocytopenia, pancytopenia, and infections as well as the timing of the formation of cotton wool spots in line with cladribine use in a person who otherwise had no risk factors for cotton wool spots as well as the resolution of cotton wool spots once off cladribine for an extended period of time.

==== Chronic migraines ====
Another proposed associated cause of cotton wool spots is chronic migraines. In a study of four subjects, two male and two female, with chronic migraines and no other present risk factors for cotton wool spots, such as normal hemoglobin A1C and blood glucose (indicating no diabetic risk), no indicators of being immunocompromised, and having blood pressures under 140/90 mm Hg (no chronic hypertension), presented with cotton wool spots in one of their eyes. Since no other risk factors were present and the common factor between the four subjects was chronic migraines, the study postulates that vasospastic syndromes common in those with chronic migraines may lead to ischemia in the eyes leading to the formation of cotton wool spots, as cotton wool spots can also act as an indicator of general vasospastic activity.

As there are many causes of cotton wool spots, oftentimes ophthalmologists will convey the findings to the person's primary health care provider and emphasize that the appearance of cotton wool spots may need workup to investigate the root cause and proper treatment pathway.

== Diagnosis ==
Cotton wool spots have two different types of ways to differentiate between other disease states or conditions that contribute to the same outcomes. One of the ways, takes account for all the conditions that are present in the eye that may actually look like cotton wool spots. The second way takes account for the root cause or causes of the cotton wool spots.

To ensure proper etiology and diagnosis, those presenting with symptoms would require a thorough history and eye exam which includes dilated retinal evaluation. Depending on the findings, a person may require further workup including blood tests to explore other potential causes. The blood work may include a complete blood count, basic metabolic panel, digestive enzymes such as amylase and lipase, and even several blood pressure measurements. Another method of diagnosis or screening is through the use of spectral domain optical coherence tomography (SD-OCT) which follows the cotton wool spots and their progression. The emergence of advanced technological tools like SD-OCT are providing new insight of neurosensory retinal health in vivo, especially in cases such as analysis of the retina post-resolution of cotton wool spots.

However, funduscopic exams that find patchy opaque areas on the retina may misdiagnose the condition as cotton wool spots instead of transient branch retinal artery occlusion (BRAO) which also does not effect vision and self-resolves.

== Treatment and management ==
Currently there are no direct treatments for cotton wool spots, however, they may fade away or disappear completely on their own in about 6 to 12 weeks. The duration of cotton wool spots typically depends on the underlying disease state that caused the cotton wool spots to appear. For example, cotton wool spots appear much smaller in HIV/AIDS in comparison to the cotton wool spots that appear in diabetes. Although, the difference in duration or half-life of the cotton wool spots may be a result of differing demographics that are affected by the underlying diseases and the overall health of the retinal vessels affected. In addition, it is thought that age may play a factor for the duration of cotton wool spots in diabetic patients. In one study, cotton wool spots were found to have a shorter duration in diabetic patients under forty years old compared to the cotton wool spots in diabetic patients over forty years old. Although there is no direct treatment of cotton wool spots, targeting the underlying origin of the disease can be beneficial in treating the cotton wool spots.

While in the acute phase, the fluorescent funduscopy exam shows obstruction of retinal capillaries in the area of the cotton wool spots. Once these areas of opacity resolve and the retina evaluation returns to normal, a fluorescent angiography is performed to determine lasting damage to the obstructed retinal capillaries. The severity of the cotton wool spots is the major determining factor in the extent of lasting capillary damage. Following the resolution of cotton wool spots, visual function does not typically recover, although cases of recovery have been documented. The exact mechanics of visual recovery is mostly unknown, but may be associated with the survival of enough ganglion axon cells to meet a necessary threshold for vision to successfully recover.

== See also ==
- Diabetic retinopathy
