= ViroPharma =

American pharmaceutical company

ViroPharma Incorporated
- Type: Public NASDAQ Biotechnology Index
- Traded as: Nasdaq: VPHM
- Industry: Healthcare, Biotechnology, Pharmaceutical company
- Founded: Exton, Pennsylvania, U.S. (1994)
- Founder: Claude H. Nash; Mark A. McKinlay; Marc S. Collett; Johanna A. Griffin; Guy D. Diana
- Defunct: 2014
- Headquarters: Exton, Pennsylvania, U.S.
- Key people: Vincent Milano (Chairman and CEO)
- Products: Vancocin
- Revenue: 132,417,000 USD (2005)
- Operating income: 88,145,000 USD (2005)
- Net income: 113,705,000 USD (2005)
- Number of employees: 232
- Website: www.viropharma.com

ViroPharma Incorporated was a pharmaceutical company that developed and sold drugs that addressed serious diseases treated by physician specialists and in hospital settings. The company focused on product development activities on viruses and human disease, including those caused by cytomegalovirus (CMV) and hepatitis C virus (HCV) infections. It was purchased by Shire in 2013, with Shire paying around $4.2 billion for the company in a deal that was finalized in January 2014. ViroPharma was a member of the NASDAQ Biotechnology Index and the S&P 600.

The company had strategic relationships with GlaxoSmithKline, Schering-Plough, and Sanofi-Aventis. ViroPharma acquired Lev Pharmaceuticals in a merger in 2008.

== History ==
ViroPharma Incorporated was founded in 1994 by Claude H. Nash (Chief Executive Officer), Mark A. McKinlay (Vice President, Research & Development), Marc S. Collett (Vice President, Discovery Research), Johanna A. Griffin (Vice President, Business Development), and Guy D. Diana (Vice President, Chemistry Research.) None of the founders are still with the company.

In November 2014, Shire plc acquired ViroPharma for $4.2 billion.

== Products ==
=== Marketed products ===
Vancocin Pulvules HCl: licensed from Eli Lilly in 2004. Oral Vancocin is an antibiotic for treatment of staphylococcal enterocolitis and antibiotic associated pseudomembranous colitis caused by Clostridioides difficile.

=== Pipeline ===
Maribavir is an oral antiviral drug candidate licensed from GlaxoSmithKline in 2003 for the prevention and treatment of human cytomegalovirus disease in hematopoietic stem cell/bone marrow transplant patients. In February 2006, ViroPharma announced that the United States Food and Drug Administration (FDA) had granted the company fast track status for maribavir.

In March 2006, the company announced that a Phase II study with maribavir demonstrated that prophylaxis with maribavir displays strong antiviral activity, as measured by statistically significant reduction in the rate of reactivation of CMV in recipients of hematopoietic stem cell/bone marrow transplants. In an intent-to-treat analysis of the first 100 days after the transplant, the number of subjects who required pre-emptive anti-CMV therapy was statistically significantly reduced (p-value = 0.051 to 0.001) in each of the maribavir groups compared to the placebo group (57% for placebo vs. 15%, 30%, and 15% for maribavir 100 mg twice daily, 400 mg daily, and 400 mg twice daily, respectively).

ViroPharma conducted a Phase III clinical study to evaluate the prophylactic use for the prevention of cytomegalovirus disease in recipients of allogeneic stem cell transplant patients. In February 2009, ViroPharma announced that the Phase III study failed to achieve its goal, showing no significant difference between maribavir and a placebo in reducing the rate of CMV disease.

=== Failed products ===
Oral pleconaril was ViroPharma's first compound, licensed from Sanofi in 1995. Pleconaril is active against viruses in the picornavirus family. ViroPharma's first indication was for enteroviral meningitis, but that indication was abandoned when the clinical trials did not demonstrate efficacy.

In 2001, ViroPharma submitted a New Drug Application of pleconaril to the FDA for the common cold. On 2002-03-19, the FDA Antiviral Advisory Committee recommended that the company had failed to show adequate safety, and the FDA subsequently issued a not-approvable letter.

In November 2004, ViroPharma licensed pleconaril to Schering-Plough, who are developing an intranasal formulation for the common cold and asthma exacerbations. (Schering-Plough Development Pipeline). In August 2006, Schering-Plough started a Phase II clinical trial.
