= Society for Industrial Microbiology and Biotechnology =

- Founded: December 29, 1949
- Founder: Walter Ezekiel, Charles Thom, and Charles L. Porter
- Type: PO
- Purpose: Microbiology, especially applications in industrial products, biotechnology, materials, and processes
- Location: Fairfax, Virginia
- Origins: Advertised meeting at AAAS conference in New York City
- Region served: Worldwide
- Method: Conferences, Publications
- Key people: Rob Donofrio, President Betty Elder, President-Elect Ramon Gonzalez, Past-President Haley Cox, Executive Director
- Website: www.simbhq.org

The Society for Industrial Microbiology and Biotechnology (SIMB) is a nonprofit, international association dedicated to the advancement of microbiological sciences, especially as they apply to industrial products, biotechnology, materials, and processes. SIMB promotes the exchange of scientific information through its meetings and publications, and serves as liaison among the specialized fields of microbiology. SIMB was established in 1949 as the Society for Industrial Microbiology (SIM) by Walter Ezekiel, Charles Thom, and Charles L. Porter.

== Governance ==
The SIMB is governed by a constitution and bylaws. The membership of SIMB elects a Board of Directors that consists of a President, President-Elect, Past-President, Secretary, Treasurer, and four Directors.

== Publications ==
SIMB has two publications, the Journal of Industrial Microbiology and Biotechnology and SIMB News.

== Scientific Meetings ==
=== SIMB Annual Meeting ===
Source:

=== Symposium on Biomaterials, Fuels and Chemicals (SBFC) ===
The first Symposium on Biotechnology for Fuels and Chemicals was held in 1978 and hosted by Oak Ridge National Laboratory (Oak Ridge, TN). It was the first technical meeting focusing exclusively on the biotechnologically-‐mediated conversion of renewable feedstocks, especially lignocellulosic plant biomass, to fuels and chemicals. This annual meeting soon became large enough to be co-‐hosted by the predecessor of the National Renewable Energy Laboratory (Golden, CO) and the Symposium's location alternated yearly between Tennessee and Colorado. In 2008, SIMB began handling the logistics of the meeting and locations were expanded to include other states, with the Symposium being held in alternate years in the eastern or western United States.

=== Recent Advances in Fermentation Technology (RAFT) ===
Source:

=== Industrial Microbiology Meets Microbiome (IMMM) ===
Source:

=== Natural Products ===
Although there has been a steady decline in natural product discovery efforts in the pharmaceutical industry over the last three decades, natural product chemical scaffolds have continued to yield important human antimicrobial agents, immunomodulators, and antitumor agents, as well as plant crop protectants. Natural product discovery is currently undergoing a renaissance based to a large extent on the observations from microbial genome sequencing projects indicating that only a fraction of the potential microbial secondary metabolites from actinomycetes, other eubacteria, and fungi have been discovered so far, and that most secondary metabolite pathways are not expressed under normal laboratory growth conditions. However, the new discipline of “genome mining” has been exploring ways to activate the expression of these “cryptic pathways.”

== Past Presidents ==
1949–51 Charles Thom (2 terms)

1951–52 Benjamin Duggar

1952–53 Kenneth B. Raper

1953–54 James Horsfall

1954–56 Boyd Woodruff (2 terms)

1956–57 J.M. McGuire

1957–58 C.W. Hesseltine

1958–59 Charles Porter

1959–60 Charles C. Yeager

1960–61 Arthur M. Kaplan

1961–62 Frederick Kavanagh

1962–63 Eugene L. Dulaney

1963–64 Brinton Miller

1964–65 Gaylen Bradley

1965–66 John N. Porter

1966–67 Saul Rich

1967–68 Leland A. Underkofler

1968–69 Robert W. Squires

1969–70 Morris R. Rogers

1970–71 John H. Litchfield

1971–72 Donal C. Wehner

1972–73 Michael A. Pisano

1973–74 Richard P. Elander

1974–75 William W. Leathen

1975–76 W. Max Stark

1976–77 Edward O. Stapley

1977–78 Robert L. Huddleston

1978–79 Allen I. Laskin

1979–80 Paul A. Lemke

1980–81 Raymond T. Testa

1981–82 Bernard J. Abbott

1982–83 Donald G. Ahearn

1983–84 C. Herb Ward

1984–85 Claude H. Nash

1985–86 George A. Somkuti

1986–87 Robert F. Acker

1987–88 Robert T. Belly

1988–89 C. George Hollis

1989–90 Paula Myers–Keith

1990–91 Arnold L. Demain

1991–92 Robert D. Schwartz

1992–93 Joseph J. Cooney

1993–94 Jennie C. Hunter–Cevera

1994–95 Edward J. Arcuri

1995–96 Steve Orndorff

1996–97 Harold Rossmoore

1997–98 Linda Lasure

1998–99 LaVerne Boeck

1999–00 Vincent Gullo

2000–01 Kristien Mortelmans

2001–02 Joan W. Bennett

2002–03 Ann C. Horan

2003–04 Douglas Jaeger

2004–05 Richard Baltz

2005–06 Jeffrey Schwartz

2006–07 Paul Cino

2007–08 Carol D. Litchfield

2008–09 George Pierce

2009–10 Susan T. Bagley

2010–11 Badal Saha

2011–12 Neal Connors

2012–13 Thomas Jeffries

2013–14 Leonard Katz

2014–15 E. Timothy Davies

2015–16 Scott Baker

2016–17 George Garrity

2017–18 Debbie Yaver

2018–19 Steve Van Dien

2019–20 Janet Westpheling

2020-21 Steve Decker

2021-2022 Noel Fong

2022-2023 Michael Resch

2024-2024 Nigel Mouncey

2024-2025 Ramon Gonzalez

2025-2026 Rob Donofrio

== Awards ==
SIMB's awards include the following:

- SIMB Industry Award
- Charles Thom Award
- Charles Porter Award
- Waksman Outstanding Teaching Award
- Fellowship Status
- Young Investigator Award
- Carol D. Litchfield Best Student Oral Presentation Award
- Carol D. Litchfield Best Student Poster Presentation Award
- Diversity Travel Awards
