= Ganciclovir =

Chemical compound

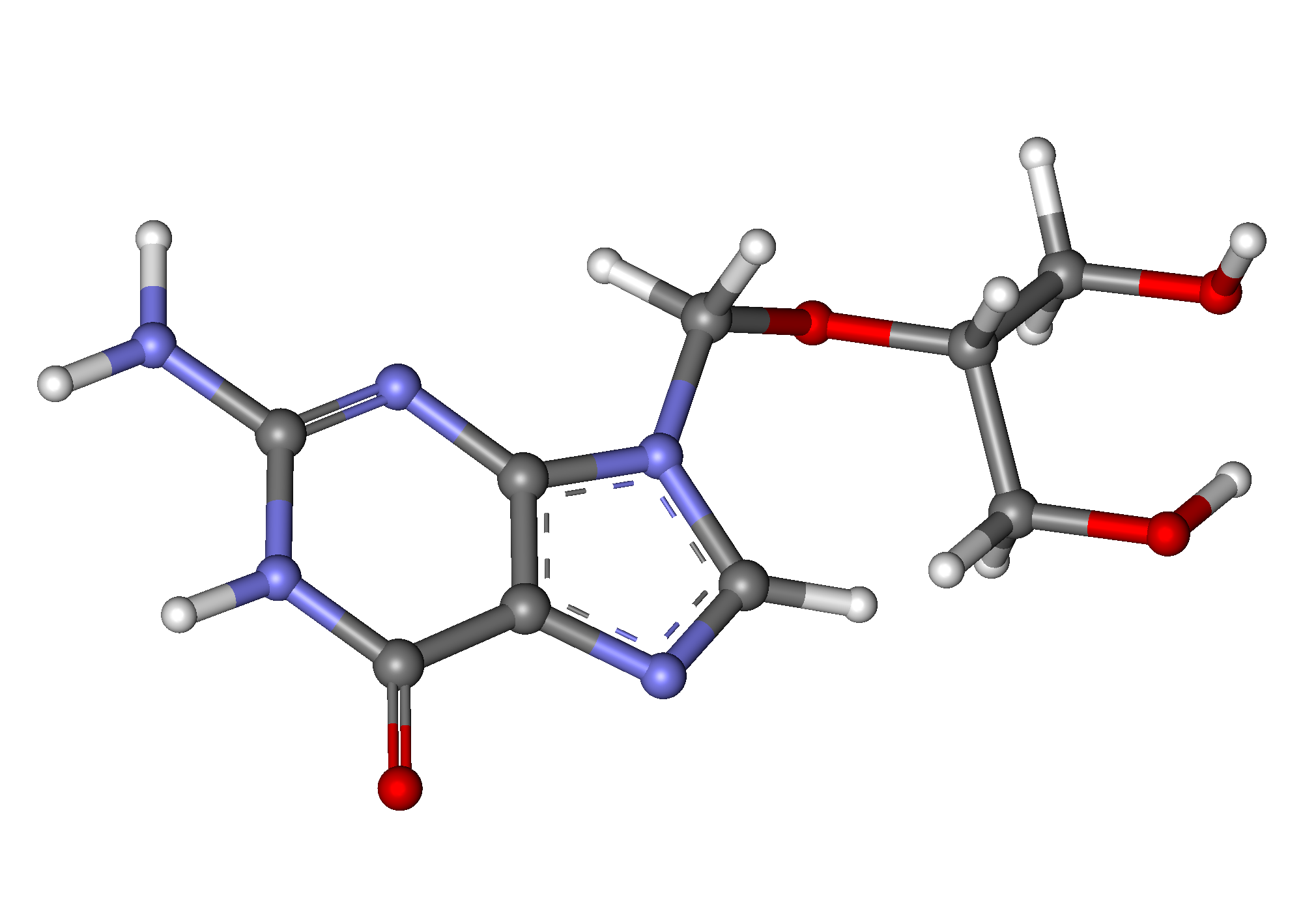

Clinical data
- Pronunciation: /ɡænˈsaɪkləvɪər/
- Trade names: Cytovene; Cymevene; Vitrasert
- Other names: gancyclovir; DHPG; 9-(1,3-dihydroxy-2-propoxymethyl)guanine
- AHFS/Drugs.com: Monograph
- MedlinePlus: a605011
- License data: US DailyMed: Ganciclovir
- Pregnancy category: AU: D
- Routes of administration: Intravenous, by mouth, intravitreal
- ATC code: J05AB06 (WHO) S01AD09 (WHO)

Legal status
- Legal status: AU: S4 (Prescription only); CA: ℞-only; UK: POM (Prescription only); US: ℞-only

Pharmacokinetic data
- Bioavailability: 5% (oral)
- Metabolism: guanylate kinase (CMV UL97 gene product)
- Elimination half-life: 2.5–5 hours
- Excretion: Kidney

Identifiers
- IUPAC name: 2-Amino-9-(1,3-dihydroxypropan-2-yloxymethyl)-3H-purin-6-one
- CAS Number: 82410-32-0
- PubChem CID: 3454
- DrugBank: DB01004
- ChemSpider: 3336
- UNII: P9G3CKZ4P5
- KEGG: D00333
- ChEBI: CHEBI:465284
- ChEMBL: ChEMBL182
- CompTox Dashboard (EPA): DTXSID8041032
- ECHA InfoCard: 100.155.403

Chemical and physical data
- Formula: C_{9}H_{13}N_{5}O_{4}
- Molar mass: 255.234 g·mol^{−1}
- 3D model (JSmol): Interactive image
- Melting point: 250 °C (482 °F) (dec.)
- SMILES: O=C2/N=C(\Nc1n(cnc12)COC(CO)CO)N
- InChI: InChI=1S/C9H13N5O4/c10-9-12-7-6(8(17)13-9)11-3-14(7)4-18-5(1-15)2-16/h3,5,15-16H,1-2,4H2,(H3,10,12,13,17); Key:IRSCQMHQWWYFCW-UHFFFAOYSA-N

Ganciclovir, sold under the brand name Cytovene among others, is an antiviral medication used to treat cytomegalovirus (CMV) infections.

Ganciclovir was patented in 1980 and approved for medical use in 1988.

== Medical use ==
Ganciclovir is indicated for:

- Sight-threatening CMV retinitis in severely immunocompromised people
- CMV pneumonitis in bone marrow transplant recipients
- Prevention of CMV disease in bone marrow and solid organ transplant recipients
- Confirmed CMV retinitis in people with AIDS (intravitreal implant)

It is also used for acute CMV colitis in HIV/AIDS and CMV pneumonitis in immunosuppressed patients.

Ganciclovir has also been used with some success in treating Human herpesvirus 6 infections.

Ganciclovir has also been found to be an effective treatment for herpes simplex virus epithelial keratitis.

== Veterinary use ==
Ganciclovir (in gel form) appears to be effective for treating the ophthalmic Felid herpesvirus 1 (FHV-1) virus infection in cats.

== Adverse effects ==
Ganciclovir is commonly associated with a range of serious haematological adverse effects. Common adverse drug reactions (≥1% of patients) include: granulocytopenia, neutropenia, anaemia, thrombocytopenia, fever, nausea, vomiting, dyspepsia, diarrhea, abdominal pain, flatulence, anorexia, raised liver enzymes, headache, confusion, hallucination, seizures, pain and phlebitis at injection site (due to high pH), sweating, rash, itch, increased serum creatinine and blood urea concentrations.

=== Toxicity ===
Ganciclovir is considered a potential human carcinogen, teratogen, and mutagen. It is also considered likely to cause inhibition of spermatogenesis. Thus, it is used judiciously and handled as a cytotoxic drug in the clinical setting.

== Mechanism of action ==
Ganciclovir (9-[(1,3-dihydroxy-2-propoxy)methyl]guanine) is a potent inhibitor of viruses of the herpes family, including cytomegalovirus (CMV), that are pathogenic for humans and animals. The primary mechanism of ganciclovir action against CMV is inhibition of the replication of viral DNA by ganciclovir-5'-triphosphate (ganciclovir-TP). This inhibition includes a selective and potent inhibition of the viral DNA polymerase. Ganciclovir is metabolized to the triphosphate form by primarily three cellular enzymes: (1) a deoxyguanosine kinase induced by CMV-infected cells; (2) guanylate kinase; and (3) phosphoglycerate kinase. Other nucleotide-metabolizing enzymes may be involved as well. The selective antiviral response associated with ganciclovir treatment is achieved because of the much weaker inhibition of cellular DNA polymerases by ganciclovir-TP. Activity and selectivity are also amplified by the accumulation of ganciclovir-TP in CMV-infected cells.

== Pharmacokinetics ==
=== Administration ===
Acute infections are treated in two phases:

- induction phase, 5 mg per kilogram intravenously every 12 hours for 14–21 days, the intravenous dose given as a 1-hour infusion
- maintenance phase, 5 mg per kg intravenously every day

Stable disease is treated with 1000 mg orally three times daily. Similar dosing is used to prevent disease in high-risk patients, such as those infected with human immunodeficiency virus (HIV) or those with organ transplants.

Ganciclovir is also available in slow-release formulations for insertion into the vitreous humour of the eye, as treatment for CMV retinitis (associated with HIV infection).

A topical ophthalmic gel preparation of Ganciclovir was approved for the treatment of acute herpes simplex keratitis.

== See also ==
Valganciclovir – the prodrug of ganciclovir
