= Valganciclovir =

Antiviral medication

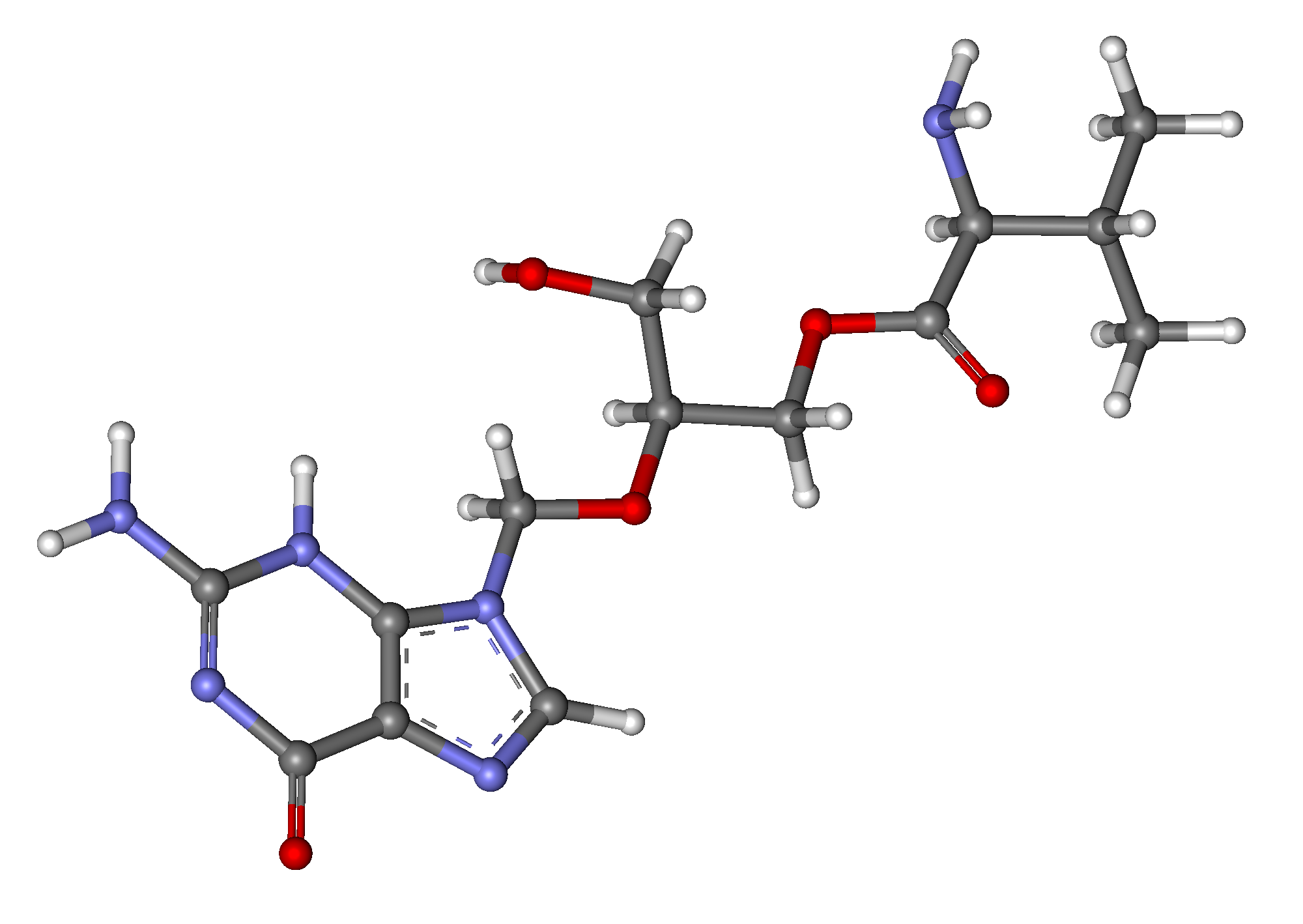

Clinical data
- Trade names: Valcyte, Valcip, others
- AHFS/Drugs.com: Monograph
- MedlinePlus: a605021
- License data: US DailyMed: Valganciclovir
- Pregnancy category: AU: D
- Routes of administration: By mouth
- ATC code: J05AB14 (WHO)

Legal status
- Legal status: AU: S4 (Prescription only); UK: POM (Prescription only); US: ℞-only

Pharmacokinetic data
- Bioavailability: 60%
- Protein binding: 1–2%
- Metabolism: Hydrolysed to ganciclovir
- Elimination half-life: 4 hours
- Excretion: Kidney

Identifiers
- IUPAC name: 2-[(2-amino-6-oxo-6,9-dihydro-3H-purin-9-yl)methoxy]-3-hydroxypropyl-(2S)-2-amino-3-methylbutanoate
- CAS Number: 175865-60-8
- PubChem CID: 135413535
- IUPHAR/BPS: 4716
- DrugBank: DB01610
- ChemSpider: 57721
- UNII: GCU97FKN3R
- KEGG: D02495; as HCl: D03256
- ChEMBL: ChEMBL1201314
- NIAID ChemDB: 032967
- PDB ligand: F9E (PDBe, RCSB PDB)
- CompTox Dashboard (EPA): DTXSID8048288

Chemical and physical data
- Formula: C_{14}H_{22}N_{6}O_{5}
- Molar mass: 354.367 g·mol^{−1}
- 3D model (JSmol): Interactive image
- SMILES: O=C(OCC(OCn1c2N\C(=N/C(=O)c2nc1)N)CO)[C@@H](N)C(C)C
- InChI: InChI=1S/C14H22N6O5/c1-7(2)9(15)13(23)24-4-8(3-21)25-6-20-5-17-10-11(20)18-14(16)19-12(10)22/h5,7-9,21H,3-4,6,15H2,1-2H3,(H3,16,18,19,22)/t8?,9-/m0/s1; Key:WPVFJKSGQUFQAP-GKAPJAKFSA-N

Valganciclovir, sold under the brand name Valcyte among others, is an antiviral medication used to treat cytomegalovirus (CMV) infection in those with HIV/AIDS or following organ transplant. It is often used long term as it only suppresses rather than cures the infection. Valganciclovir is taken by mouth.

Common side effects include abdominal pain, headaches, trouble sleeping, nausea, fever, and low blood cell counts. Other side effects may include infertility and kidney problems. When used during pregnancy, it causes birth defects in some animals. Valganciclovir is the L-valyl ester of ganciclovir and works when broken down into ganciclovir by the intestine and liver.

Valganciclovir was approved for medical use in 2001. It is on the World Health Organization's List of Essential Medicines. In 2017, a generic version was approved.

== Medical uses ==
=== Adults ===
Valganciclovir is commonly used for treatment of cytomegalovirus (CMV) retinitis (eye infection may cause blindness) in people who have acquired immunodeficiency syndrome (AIDS). Valganciclovir is also used to prevent cytomegalovirus disease in people who have received a heart, kidney, or kidney-pancreas transplant and who have a chance of getting CMV disease. Overall, valganciclovir works by preventing the spread of CMV disease or slowing the growth of CMV.

=== Children ===
Valganciclovir is used for the prevention of CMV disease in people following kidney transplant (4 months to 16 years of age) and heart transplant (1 month to 16 years of age) at high risk.

== Side effects ==
Valganciclovir is commonly associated with vomiting, abdominal pain, diarrhea, and headache. Other side effects include fever, trouble sleeping, peripheral neuropathy, and retinal detachment.

Of note, the FDA issued several black box warnings concerning potential severe toxicities. These include:

- Blood toxicities: neutropenia, anemia, thrombocytopenia
- Impairment of fertility (based on animal studies only)
- Fetal toxicities (based on animal studies only)
- Mutagenesis and carcinogenesis (based on animal studies only)

== Drug interactions ==
While not studied in people, it can be assumed that interactions will be similar as those with ganciclovir, since valganciclovir is converted into ganciclovir in the body. Zidovudine may decrease the concentration of ganciclovir, and together the drugs can cause anemia and neutropenia. Probenecid can increase the concentration of ganciclovir, which could increase the chances of ganciclovir toxicity. People with kidney problems could have an increase in both mycophenolate mofetil and ganciclovir concentrations when both drugs are taken together. Ganciclovir can also increase the concentration of didanosine.

== Mechanism of action ==
Valganciclovir is a prodrug for ganciclovir, which is a synthetic analog of 2′-deoxy-guanosine. Its structure is the same as ganciclovir, except for the addition of a L-valyl ester at the 5' end of the incomplete deoxyribose ring. The valine increases both the absorption of the drug in the intestines, as well as the bioavailability of the drug once it is absorbed. The L-valyl ester is cleaved by esterases in the intestines and the liver, leaving ganciclovir to be absorbed by the virus-infected cells.

Ganciclovir is first phosphorylated to ganciclovir monophosphate by a viral thymidine kinase encoded by the cytomegalovirus (CMV) upon infection. Human cellular kinases further phosphorylate the molecule to create ganciclovir diphosphate, then ganciclovir triphosphate. These kinases are present in 10-fold greater concentrations in CMV or herpes simplex virus (HSV)-infected cells compared to uninfected human cells, allowing ganciclovir triphosphate to concentrate in infected cells.

Ganciclovir triphosphate is a competitive inhibitor of deoxyguanosine triphosphate (dGTP). It is incorporated into viral DNA and preferentially inhibits viral DNA polymerases more than cellular DNA polymerases. Ganciclovir triphosphate serves as a poor substrate for chain elongation. Once incorporated into viral DNA due to its structural similarity to dGTP, chain termination occurs once a single nucleotide is added to the distal hydroxyl group of the incomplete deoxyribose ring of ganciclovir.

== Pharmacokinetics ==
1. Oral bioavailability is approximately 60%. Fatty foods significantly increase the bioavailability and the peak level in the serum.
2. It takes about 2 hours to reach maximum concentrations in the serum.
3. Valganciclovir is eliminated as ganciclovir in the urine, with a half-life of about 4 hours in people with normal kidney function.
4. The mechanism of this drug is activation via a viral protein kinase HCMV UL97 and subsequent phosphorylation by cellular kinases. The phosphotransferase enzyme can likewise activate valganciclovir.

== Chemistry ==
The synthesis of valganciclovir has been reviewed. Many routes use ganciclovir as a starting material.

== Society and culture ==
=== Price and patent status ===
Roche's Valcyte is protected by patent. However a generic version manufactured by Japanese-owned Indian company Daiichi-Ranbaxy was found by the District Court of New Jersey, USA not to infringe Roche's patent. In November 2014, FDA approved generics by two manufacturers.

The price of a four-month course of valganciclovir from Roche is about US$8,500 in high-income countries, $6,000 in India. However, the valganciclovir patent was rejected by the Indian Patent Office in 2010, although Roche may appeal the rejection.

=== Names ===
Also known as Cymeval, Valcyt, Valixa, Darilin, Rovalcyte, Patheon, and Syntex.
