= Chin-Shing Huang =

Taiwanese historian

- 黃進興
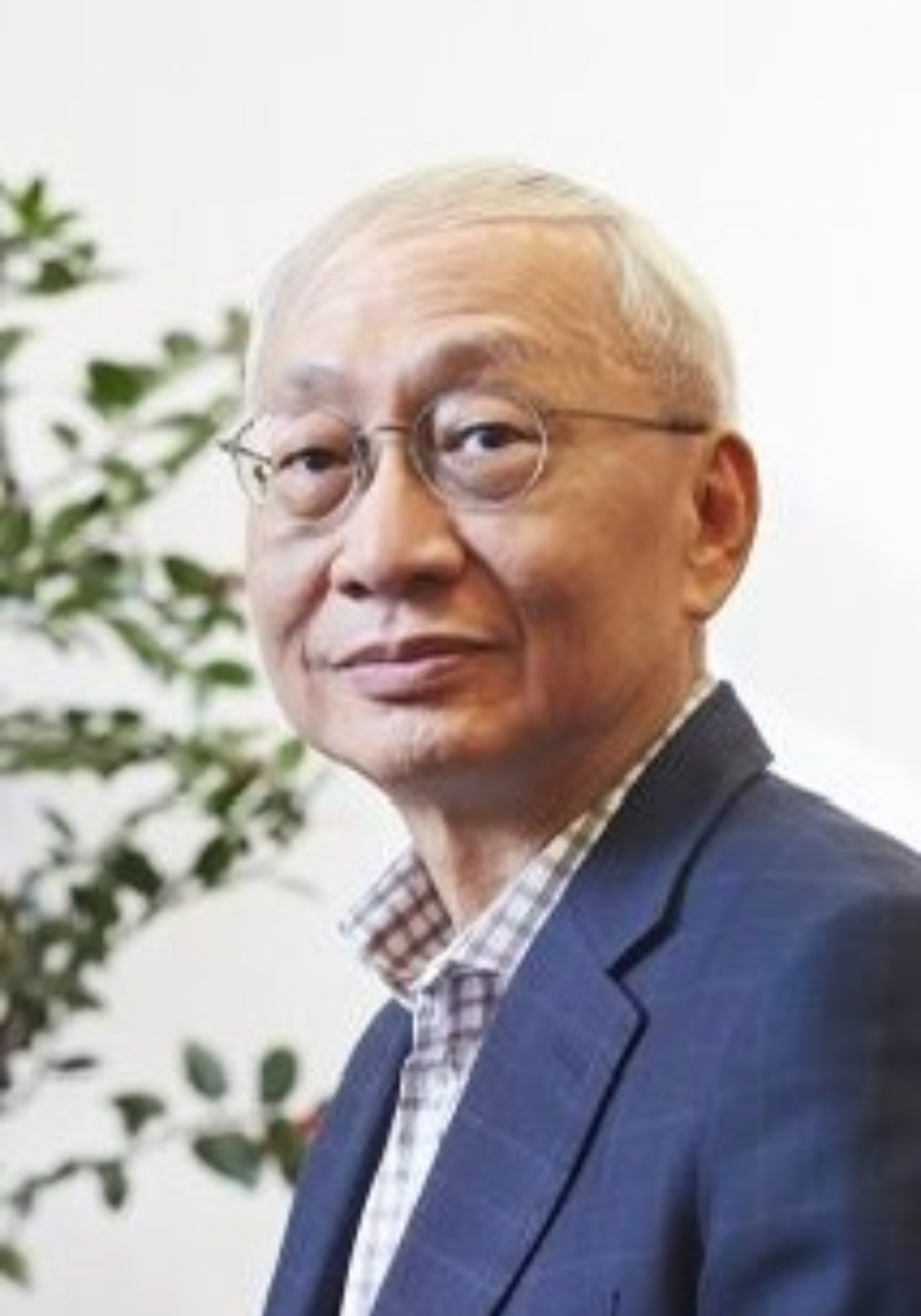
- Official portrait, 2016

Vice President of Academia Sinica
- In office 1 September 2016 – September 19, 2024 Serving with Mei-Yin Chou and Tang K. Tang
- President: James C. Liao
- Preceded by: Wang Fan-sen

Personal details
- Born: 1958 (age 67–68) Taiwan
- Education: National Taiwan University (BA, MA); Harvard University (PhD)

Chin-Shing Huang (Chinese: 黃進興; born 1950) is a Taiwanese historian who was vice president of the Academia Sinica from 2016 to 2024.

== Education ==
Huang graduated from National Taiwan University with a B.A. in history in 1973 and an M.A. in history in 1975. He then earned his Ph.D. in history from Harvard University in 1983 under historian Yu Ying-shih. His doctoral dissertation was titled, "The Lu-Wang school in the Ch'ing dynasty: Li Mu-t'ang".

== Career ==
After receiving his doctorate, Huang began working as a research fellow at Academia Sinica soon after graduation. He has held adjunct and honorary professorships and chairs at several universities in Taiwan, among them National Taiwan University, National Tsing Hua University, Taipei Medical University, and National Sun Yat-sen University. Huang was elected to membership within Academia Sinica in 2008.
