= Tang K. Tang =

Biomedical researcher

- 唐堂
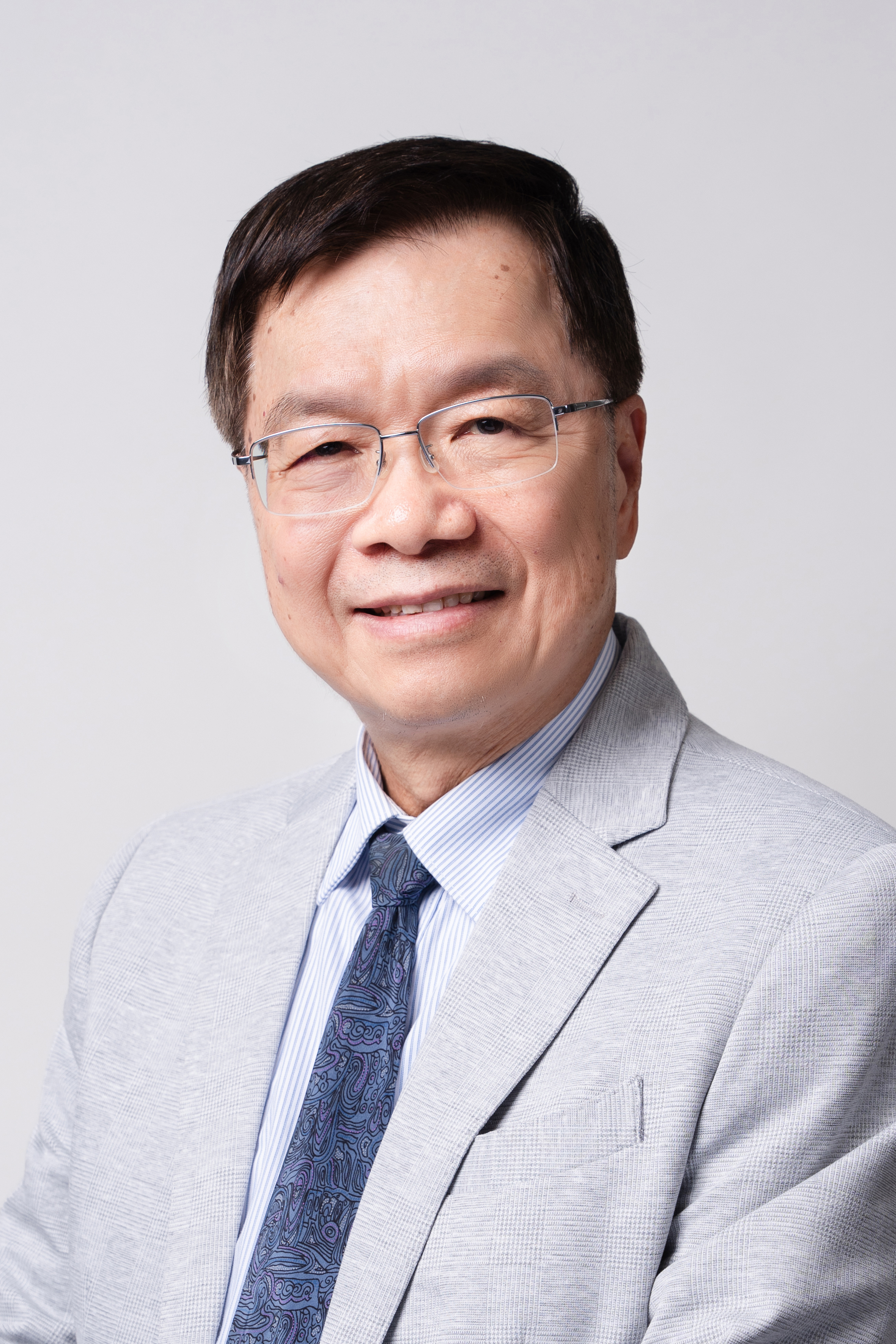
- Official portrait, 2024

Vice President of Academia Sinica
- In office 21 December 2022 – 18 June 2026 Serving with Mei-Yin Chou and Chin-Shing Huang
- President: James C. Liao
- Preceded by: Fu-Tong Liu
- Succeeded by: Yi-Fang Tsay

Personal details
- Born: 1956 (age 69–70)
- Education: Tunghai University (BS); National Yang-Ming University (MS); Yale University (MA, PhD)

Tang Kent Tang (Chinese: 唐堂; pinyin: Táng Táng; born 1956) is a Taiwanese geneticist, cellular biologist, and biomedical researcher who was vice president of Academia Sinica from 2022 to 2026. He is best known for his research on centrosomes.

== Early life and education ==
Tang was born in 1956 in Taiwan. He spent his childhood in rural Pingtung County, where he developed an early interest in biology. During his secondary education, he attended several schools in Taipei because of his father's work. He finished high school at Cheng Kung Senior High School, graduating in 1974.

After high school, Tang graduated from Tunghai University with a Bachelor of Science in biology in 1978. He then earned a Master of Science in microbiology and immunology from National Yang-Ming University in 1983. Following his master's studies, Tang was awarded a government-funded scholarship to pursue further education in the United States. He earned his M.A. and his Ph.D. in human genetics in 1988 from Yale University. His doctoral dissertation was titled, Molecular cloning and tissue-specific regulation of erythroid and nonerythroid membrane skeletal protein 4.1.

== Academic career ==
After completing his doctorate, Tang completed postdoctoral research in internal medicine at the Yale School of Medicine from 1988 to 1989. At the end of his postdoctoral fellowship, he became a researcher at the Institute of Biomedical Sciences of Academia Sinica, where he later served as an associate research fellow, research fellow, and distinguished research fellow.

In 2022, Tang was elected a member of Academia Sinica. He remains a Distinguished Research Fellow at the Institute of Biomedical Sciences.

He also is a member of the Program in Molecular Medicine, a collaboration between National Yang Ming Chiao Tung University and Academia Sinica.

He co-holds patents with Academia Sinica research colleagues.
