= Liu Ts'ui-jung =

Taiwanese historian

- 劉翠溶
- Born: 5 December 1941 (age 84)
- Education: National Taiwan University (BA, MA); Harvard University (MA, PhD)

Liu Ts'ui-jung (Chinese: 劉翠溶; pinyin: Liú Cuìróng; Pe̍h-ōe-jī: Lâu Chhùi-iông; born 5 December 1941) is a Taiwanese historian.

== Life and career ==
Born in 1941, Liu attended National Changhua Girls' Senior High School in her hometown of Changhua. She graduated from National Taiwan University with a bachelor's degree in history in 1963 and a master's degree in 1966. Liu worked as a research fellow at Academia Sinica until receiving a scholarship from the Harvard–Yenching Institute. She earned a second master's degree, followed by a doctorate at Harvard University. Liu returned to Academia Sinica after finishing her doctoral studies. She has taught as an associate professor at Soochow University and NTU, where she was promoted to full professor in 1980. Liu held several visiting fellowships and professorships throughout her career. She was elected a member of Academia Sinica in 1996, and remained a research fellow there until 2015.

Liu was elected a board member of the Chiang Ching-kuo Foundation in 2000, and appointed one of three vice presidents of the Academia Sinica under Wong Chi-huey in 2006, alongside Andrew H. J. Wang and Liu Chao-han. In March 2013, Liu lost NT$20 million in a case of telephone fraud.
