= Wang Fan-sen =

Taiwanese historian (born 1958)

- 王汎森
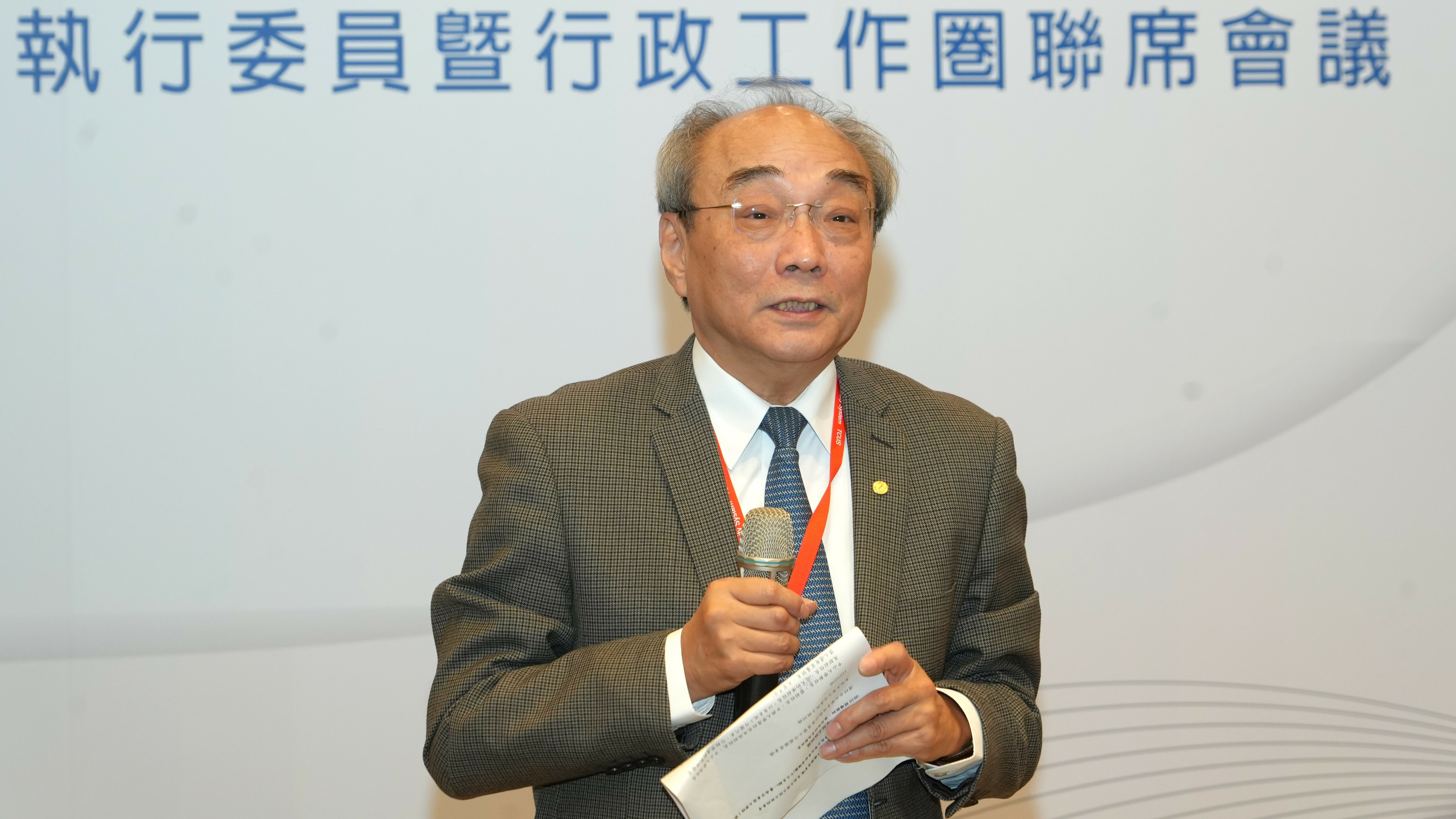
- Wang in 2023

3rd President of the Taiwan Comprehensive University System
- Incumbent
- Assumed office 1 January 2022
- Preceded by: Paul Chu

Acting President of the Academia Sinica
- In office 11 May 2016 – 20 June 2016
- President: Ma Ying-jeou; Tsai Ing-wen
- Preceded by: Chi-Huey Wong
- Succeeded by: James C. Liao

Vice President of the Academia Sinica
- In office 4 January 2010 – 30 August 2016 Serving with Andrew H. J. Wang and Wang Yu
- President: Chi-Huey Wong; Himself (acting); James C. Liao
- Preceded by: Liu Ts'ui-jung
- Succeeded by: Chin-Shing Huang

Personal details
- Born: October 25, 1958 (age 68) Beigang, Yunlin, Taiwan
- Education: National Taiwan University (BA, MA); Princeton University (PhD)

Wang Fan-sen (Chinese: 王汎森; born 25 October 1958) is a Taiwanese historian who is the current president of the Taiwan Comprehensive University System since 2022. He formerly served as acting president of Academia Sinica in 2016, after the resignation of Chi-Huey Wong.

== Education ==
In 1976, Wang graduated from Taipei Municipal Chien Kuo High School, where he was classmates with James C. Liao. After high school, he graduated from National Taiwan University with a bachelor's degree in history in 1980 and a master's degree in history in 1983. He began working for the Institute of History and Philology (IHP) at Academia Sinica as an assistant research fellow in 1985, then completed doctoral studies in the United States, earning his Ph.D. in East Asian studies from Princeton University in 1992 under Yu Ying-shih.

== Academic career ==
Upon his return to the IHP in 1993, he was promoted to associate researcher until 1998, when he became full researcher. In 2005, Wang was appointed a distinguished research fellow. Wang served as IHP director from 2003 to 2009. Academia Sinica president Chi-Huey Wong named Wang a vice president of the Academia Sinica on 1 January 2010. On 1 June of the same year, Wang succeeded Liu Ts'ui-jung as head of the Taiwan e-learning and Digital Archives Program.

In April 2016, several weeks before President of the Republic of China Ma Ying-jeou was to complete his second consecutive term, Wang announced that the Academia Sinica had settled on three candidates for its next leader. After the resignation of Chi-Huey Wong as head of Academia Sinica in May 2016, Ma appointed Wang Fan-sen the acting leader. Eventually, it was decided that Ma's successor Tsai Ing-wen would select the Academia Sinica leader after she had taken office. After Tsai named James C. Liao to the Academia Sinica's highest-ranking position, Wang's acting tenure came to an end.

In November 2017, Wang was one of eight candidates considered for the position of National Taiwan University president. While the Ministry of Education considered the presidential selection process flawed and originally refused Kuan Chung-ming's selection, Wang stated that he would not be running in another election. Kuan was eventually permitted to take up the NTU presidency in January 2019.

== Honors and awards ==
Wang was elected to membership of the Academia Sinica in 2004, and became a fellow of the Royal Historical Society the following year. In 2023, Wang won a Humboldt Research Award.

== Selected publications ==
- Wang, Fan-sen (2000). Fu Ssu-nien: A Life in Chinese History and Politics. Cambridge University Press. doi:10.1017/CBO9780511529191. ISBN 9780521480512.
