= Shin-Kun Peng =

Taiwanese economist (born 1956)

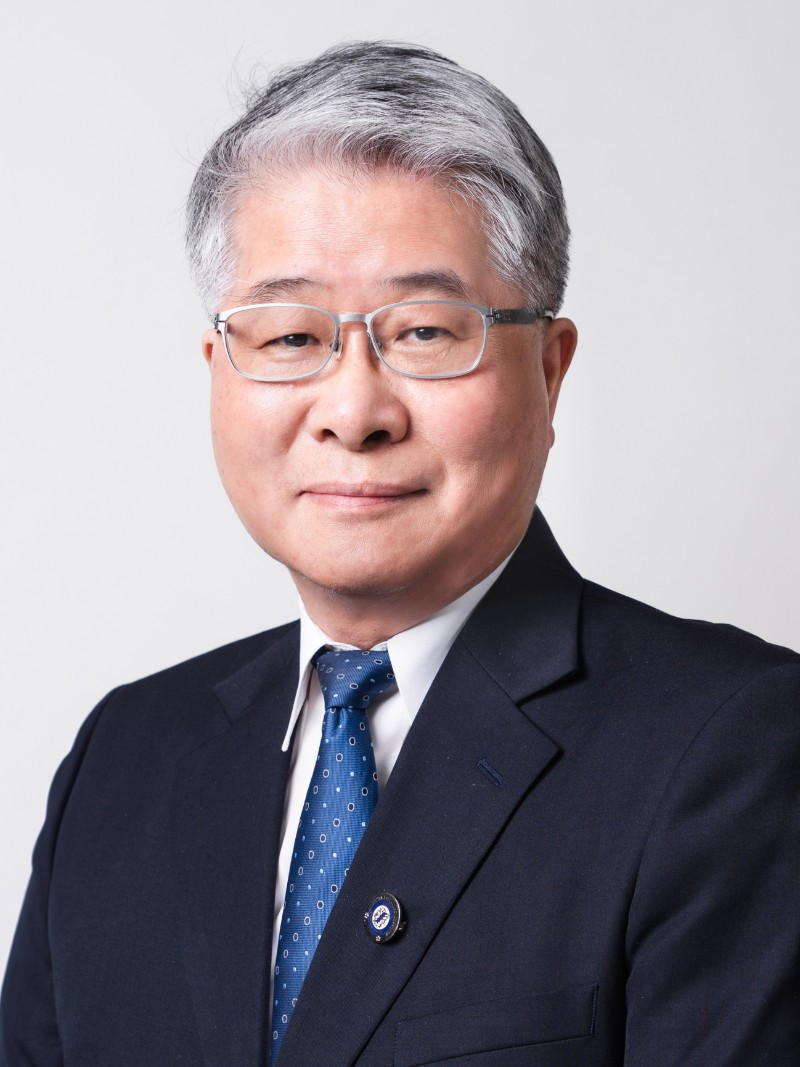
- Official portrait, 2026

Vice President of the Academia Sinica
- Incumbent
- Assumed office 21 June 2026
- President: Chen Chien-jen
- Preceded by: Mei-Yin Chou

Personal details
- Born: 1956 (age 69–70)
- Education: National Cheng Kung University (BS, MS); University of Pennsylvania (PhD)
- Scientific career
- Fields: Regional science
- Thesis: City structure, agglomeration and urban configuration in spatial economy (1989)

Shin-Kun Peng (Chinese: 彭信坤; pinyin: Péng Xìnkūn; born 1956) is a Taiwanese economist specializing in regional science who has been vice president of Academia Sinica since 2024.

== Education and career ==
Peng graduated from National Cheng Kung University with a Bachelor of Science (B.S.) in transportation engineering in 1979 and a Master of Science (M.S.) in transportation engineering in 1982. He then completed doctoral studies in the United States, earning his Ph.D. in regional economics from the University of Pennsylvania in 1989. His doctoral dissertation was titled, "City structure, agglomeration and urban configuration in spatial economy".

Peng has been a joint professor of economics at both National Taiwan University (since 2003) and National Cheng Kung University (since 2009). He was elected Academician of Academia Sinica in 2008. He has also been a distinguished research fellow of economics at Academia Sinica since 2011. He was appointed as a vice president of Academia Sinica in September 2024.

Peng is a researcher in the fields of international trade, regional economics, and industrial organization.
