= James Liao =

James Liao may refer to:

- James C. Liao (born 1958), Taiwanese-American synthetic biologist
- James Hiroyuki Liao (born 1976), American actor
