= James C. Liao =

Taiwanese chemical engineer and metabolic engineer (born 1958)

- 廖俊智
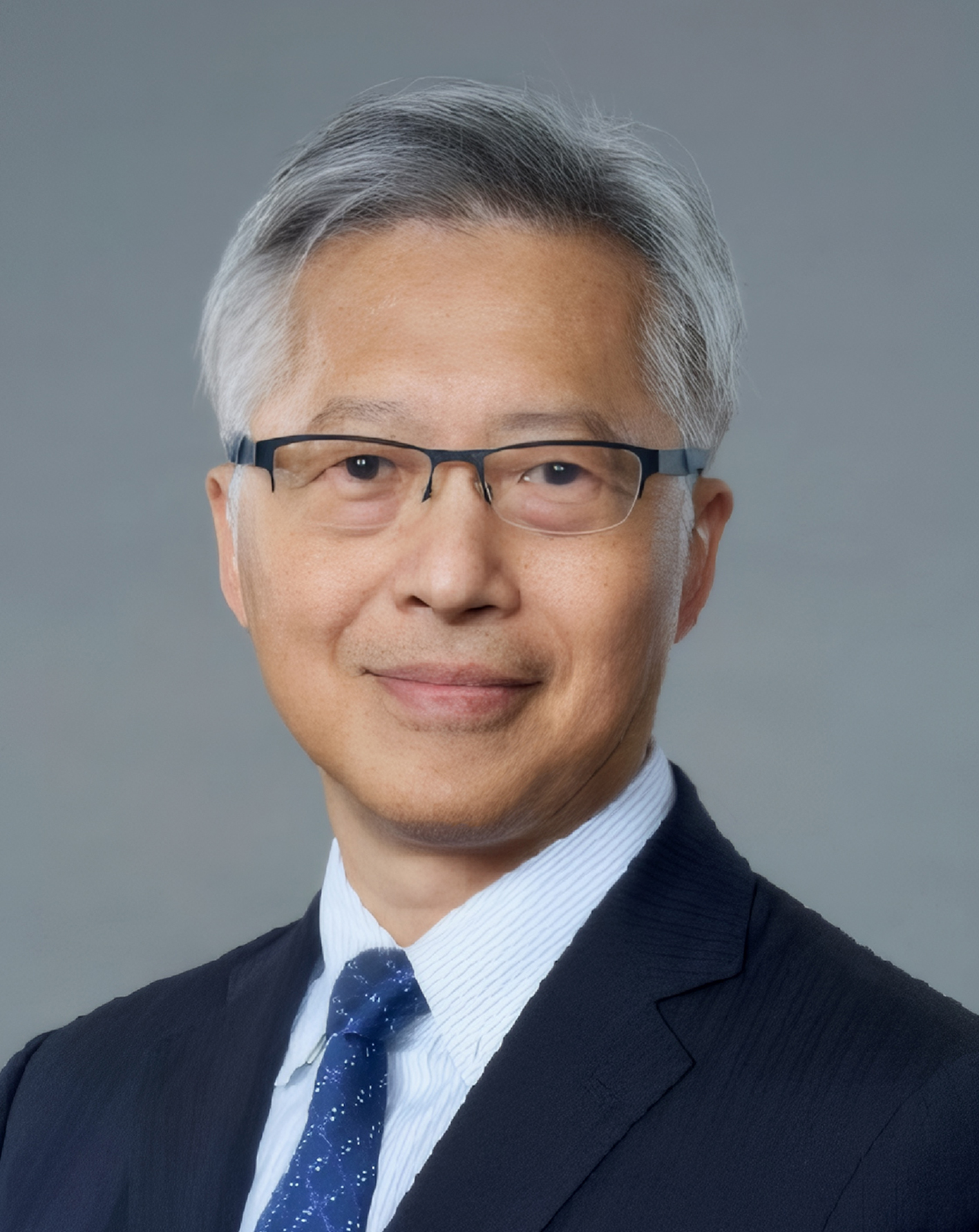
- Official portrait, 2025

9th President of the Academia Sinica
- In office 21 June 2016 – 21 June 2026
- Appointed by: Tsai Ing-wen
- Vice President: 1st Vice President; Wang Fan-sen; Chou Mei-yin; 2nd Vice President; Andrew H. J. Wang; Liu Fu-tong; 3rd Vice President; Wang Yu; Tang K. Tang
- Preceded by: Wang Fan-sen (a.i.)
- Succeeded by: Chen Chien-jen

Personal details
- Born: 1958 (age 67–68) Kaohsiung, Taiwan
- Education: National Taiwan University (BS); University of Wisconsin–Madison (PhD)
- Awards: Marvin J. Johnson Award (2009)
- Scientific career
- Fields: Chemical engineering Synthetic biology Biochemistry
- Thesis: Modelling of Biochemical Reaction Networks (1987)
- Doctoral advisor: Edwin N. Lightfoot

Liao Chun-Chih (Chinese: 廖俊智; pinyin: Liào Jùnzhì; born 1958), also known by his English name James Liao, is a Taiwanese-American chemical engineer and metabolic engineer who served as the president of Academia Sinica (AS) from 2016 to 2026.

After earning his doctorate from the University of Wisconsin–Madison, Liao became a professor of chemical engineering at Texas A&M University in 1990. He then became a professor at the University of California, Los Angeles (UCLA), where he was the Parsons Foundation Professor of Chemical and Biomolecular Engineering from 2011 to 2016.

Liao is an elected member of the National Academy of Sciences, the National Academy of Engineering, and the National Academy of Inventors. He is best known for his work in metabolic engineering, synthetic biology, and bioenergy. Liao has been recognized for his research in the biosynthesis and production of higher alcohols such as isobutanol from sugars, cellulose, waste protein, or carbon dioxide.

== Early life and education ==
Lai was born in Kaohsiung, Taiwan, in 1958. Both of his parents were engineers. He was raised in Taipei, and graduated from Taipei Municipal Chien Kuo High School in 1976. During high school, he won a national scholarship for outstanding performance in chemistry, physics, and mathematics. He was high school classmates with legislator Apollo Chen and historian Wang Fan-sen.

Lin graduated from National Taiwan University with a Bachelor of Science (B.S.) in chemical engineering in 1980. After graduation, he completed two years of military service in the Republic of China Armed Forces, then pursued graduate studies in the United States. He earned his Ph.D. in chemical engineering from the University of Wisconsin–Madison in 1987, and studied under Manfred Morari and W. Harmon Ray while there. His doctoral dissertation, completed under professor Edwin N. Lightfoot, was titled, "Modelling of biochemical reaction networks".

As a doctoral student in Wisconsin, Lin initially specialized in biochemical reaction systems before focusing on quantitative biology and systems biology. He co-authored and published four academic papers under Lightfoot before receiving his doctorate.

== Academic career ==
After receiving his doctorate, Liao worked as a research scientist for Eastman Kodak from 1987 to 1989. In 1990, he became an assistant professor of chemical engineering at Texas A&M University. He was named an associate professor at the university in 1993 and jointly held professorships there in chemical engineering, biochemistry, and biophysics from 1993 to 1997.

In 1997, Liao moved to the University of California, Los Angeles (UCLA), as a professor of chemical and biomolecular engineering. He was vice-chair of the university's department from 2002 to 2007, named a Chancellor's Professor in 2008, and received the university's appointment as its Ralph M. Parsons Foundation Professor in 2011. He was the chairman of the Department of Chemical and Biomolecular Engineering at the Samueli School of Engineering from 2012 to 2016 and the chairman of the Department of Bioengineering from 2015 to 2016.

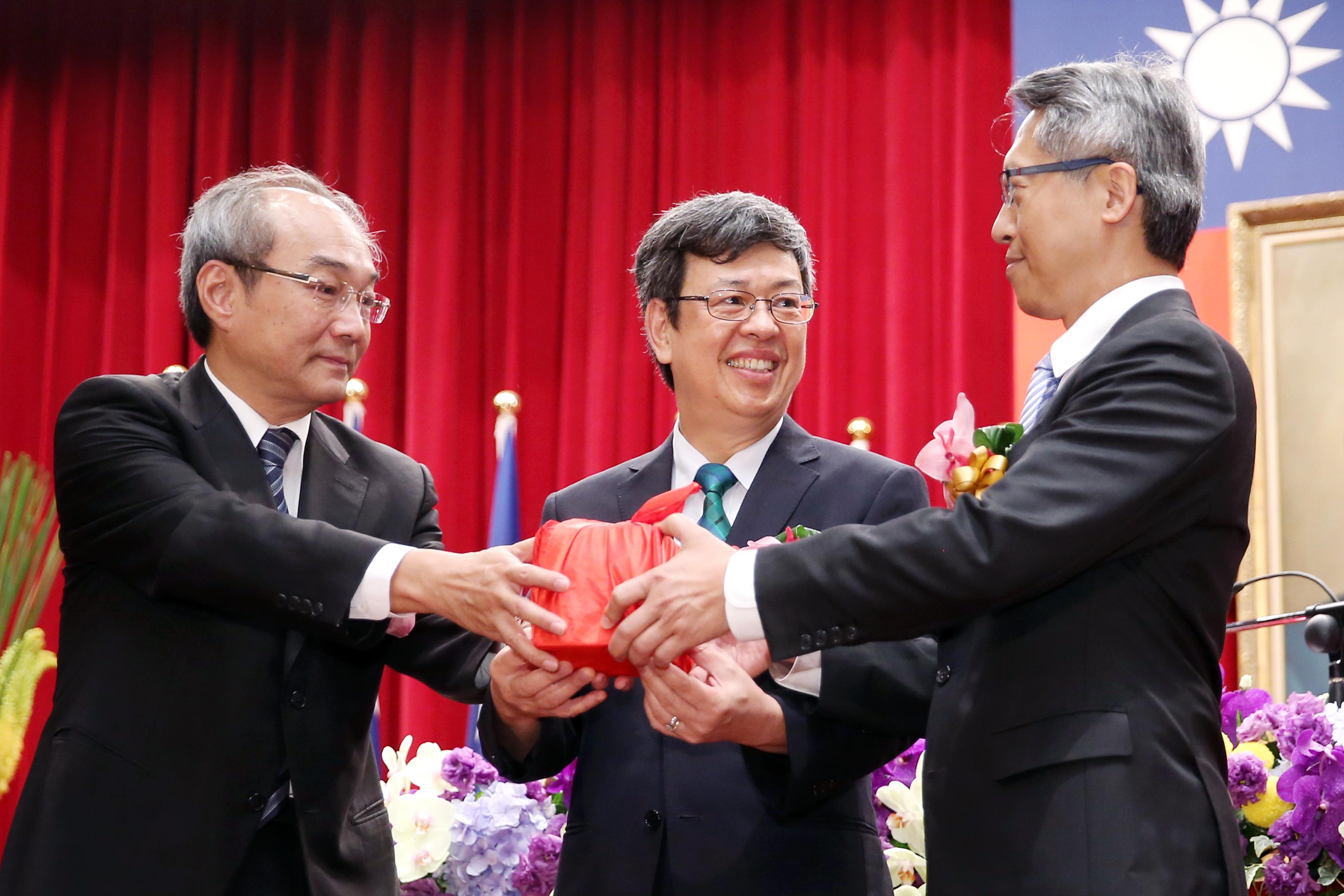
Liao (right) being inaugurated in 2016 as president of Academia Sinica by Wang Fan-sen (left) with Chen Chien-jen (middle) presiding

While at UCLA, Liao was known for his pioneering work on developing more efficient biofuels and on advancing new production methods for isobutanol. He currently remains a principal investigator at the UCLA Metabolic Engineering and Synthetic Biology Laboratory, where he heads the Liao Lab, but is on leave to serve as president of AS.

On June 3, 2016, Liao was selected by Taiwanese president Tsai Ing-wen to be the next president of Academia Sinica, Taiwan's highest academic institution. He assumed the office on June 21, 2016, succeeding Chi-Huey Wong. He took a leave of absence from UCLA to assume the post. On January 2, 2026, president Lai Ching-te selected Chen Chien-jen to be Liao's successor.

== Research ==
Liao's research interests include biological synthesis of fuels and chemicals, carbon and nitrogen assimilation, metabolic engineering and synthetic biology, transcriptional and metabolic networks analysis, fatty acid metabolism. He is currently the co-founder and lead scientific advisor of Easel Biotechnologies, LLC, a biotechnology research company.

=== Protein based biofuels ===
Liao and his team are researching protein based biofuels which use proteins, rather than fats or carbohydrates, as a significant raw material for biorefining and biofuel production. The benefit of using protein is that the protein metabolism is much faster than fatty acid metabolism such as algae biofuels, which leads to higher production.

=== Electrofuels ===
Liao's lab recently participated in the US Department of Energy's Electrofuels program. They proposed converting solar energy into liquid fuels such as isobutanol. A new bioreactor could store electricity as liquid fuel with the help of a genetically engineered microbes and carbon dioxide. The isobutanol produced would have an energy density close to gasoline.

=== Non-oxidative glycolysis ===
Liao has also worked on the creation of a non-oxidative glycolysis pathway. Natural metabolic pathways degrade sugars in an oxidative way that loses 1/3 of the carbon to CO_{2} in fermentation. The Liao laboratory has developed a pathway, called Non-oxidative glycolysis (NOG), that allows 100% carbon conservation in various fermentation processes.

== Awards and honors ==
- Samson-Prime Minister's Prize for Innovation in Alternative Energy and Smart Mobility for Transportation, Israel, 2020
- Elected to The World Academy of Sciences 2019
- Elected to National Academy of Sciences 2015
- Elected Academician of Academia Sinica, 2014
- Industrial Application of Science from National Academy of Sciences 2014
- Elected to National Academy of Engineering 2013
- ENI award for Renewable Energy 2013
- White House Champion of Change in Renewable Energy, 2012
- Presidential Green Chemistry Award from EPA 2010
- James E. Bailey Award, Society for Biological Engineering, 2009
- Alpha Chi Sigma Award, American Institute of Chemical Engineers, 2009
- Marvin J. Johnson Award, Biochemical Technology Division, American Chemical Society, 2009
- Charles Thom Award, Society for Industrial Microbiology, 2008
- Merck Award for Metabolic Engineering, 2006
- FPBE Division Award of American Institute of Chemical Engineers, 2006
- Fellow, American Institute for Medical and Biological Engineering, 2002
- National Science Foundation Young Investigator Award, 1992

== Personal life ==
Liao holds both Taiwanese and American citizenship. He is married to Kelly Liao and has two daughters, Carol and Clara Liao.
