= Botanical Studies =

- Discipline: Botany
- Language: English
- Edited by: Yu-Ming Ju

Publication details
- Former name: Botanical Bulletin of Academia Sinica
- History: 1947-present
- Publisher: Springer Science+Business Media
- Open access: Yes
- License: Creative Commons Attribution License 4.0
- Impact factor: 4.1 (2023)

Standard abbreviations
- ISO 4: Bot. Stud.

Indexing
- CODEN: BSOTBT
- ISSN: 1817-406X (print); 1999-3110 (web)
- LCCN: 224542518
- OCLC no.: 613046485
- Botanical Bulletin of Academia Sinica
- ISSN: 0006-8063

Links
- Journal homepage; Online access

Botanical Studies is a peer-reviewed open access scientific journal covering all aspects of botany. It is published by Springer Science+Business Media and affiliated with the Institute of Plant and Microbial Biology (Academia Sinica, Taiwan). The editors-in-chief is Yu-Ming Ju (Academia Sinica). The journal was established in 1947 as the Botanical Bulletin of Academia Sinica, receiving its current title in 2006.

== Abstracting and indexing ==
The journal is abstracted and indexed in:

- Biological Abstracts
- BIOSIS Previews
- Chemical Abstracts Service
- Current Contents/Agriculture, Biology & Environmental Sciences
- Science Citation Index
- Scopus

According to the Journal Citation Reports, the journal has a 2023 impact factor of 4.1.
