= Chen Pei-jer =

Taiwanese hepatologist

- 陳培哲
- Born: 1955 (age 70–71)
- Education: National Taiwan University (MD); University of Pennsylvania (PhD)
- Scientific career
- Fields: Hepatology
- Institutions: National Taiwan University; NTU Hospital; Academia Sinica
- Thesis: A Study of a Novel Process in Shaping the Eukaryotic Genome: Transposition via Nonviral RNA Intermediates (1986)
- Doctoral advisor: John Taylor

Chen Pei-jer (Chinese: 陳培哲; pinyin: Chén Péizhé; born 1955) is a Taiwanese hepatologist and pathologist who is an academician of Academia Sinica.

== Early life and education ==
Chen Pei-jer was raised by his grandparents in Shalu, Taichung, while his parents worked in northern Taiwan. He had three siblings.

After high school, Chen attended medical school at National Taiwan University and graduated with a Doctor of Medicine (M.D.) in 1981. He then completed doctoral studies in the United States at the University of Pennsylvania, where he earned his Ph.D. in pathology in 1987 from the Perelman School of Medicine. His doctoral dissertation was titled, "A study of a novel process in shaping the eukaryotic genome: Transposition via nonviral RNA intermediates (retrovirus, processed gene)".

== Career ==
Upon completing his doctorate, Chen returned to National Taiwan University as a postdoctoral researcher, later joining the faculty in 1987. He was elected a member of Academia Sinica in 2006, and into The World Academy of Sciences in 2011.

Chen specializes in hepatitis research. He helped treat patients during the 2003 SARS outbreak, and was invited to a SARS-related seminar hosted by the World Health Organization, but did not attend because he was unable to isolate sufficiently after treating SARS patients, per the regulations in force for that meeting. Chen was invited to the 2009 World Health Assembly as part of the Chinese Taipei delegation. During the COVID-19 pandemic in Taiwan, Chen served on the vaccine review committee until late May 2021. Upon announcing his resignation from the body in June, Chen stated that the committee would struggle to remain neutral when reviewing Taiwanese-made vaccines.
