= Zoological Studies =

- Discipline: Zoology
- Language: English
- Edited by: Benny K.K. Chan

Publication details
- Former names: Bulletin of the Institute of Zoology, Academia Sinica
- History: 1962–present
- Publisher: Biodiversity Research Center, Academia Sinica
- Open access: Yes
- License: Creative Commons Attribution License 4.0
- Impact factor: 2.058 (2020)

Standard abbreviations
- ISO 4: Zool. Stud.

Indexing
- ISSN: 1021-5506 (print); 1810-522X (web)

Links
- Journal homepage

Zoological Studies is a peer-reviewed open access scientific journal covering zoology, with focuses on animal behavior, comparative physiology, evolution, ecology, systematics and biogeography. It is published by the Biodiversity Research Center, Academia Sinica, Taiwan. The editor-in-chief is Benny K.K. Chan. It was established in 1962 as the Bulletin of the Institute of Zoology, Academia Sinica, receiving its current title in 1994.

== Abstracting and indexing ==
The journal is abstracted and indexed in:

- BIOSIS Previews
- Science Citation Index

According to the Journal Citation Reports, the journal has a 2020 impact factor of 2.058.
