= Academician of the Chinese Academy of Sciences =

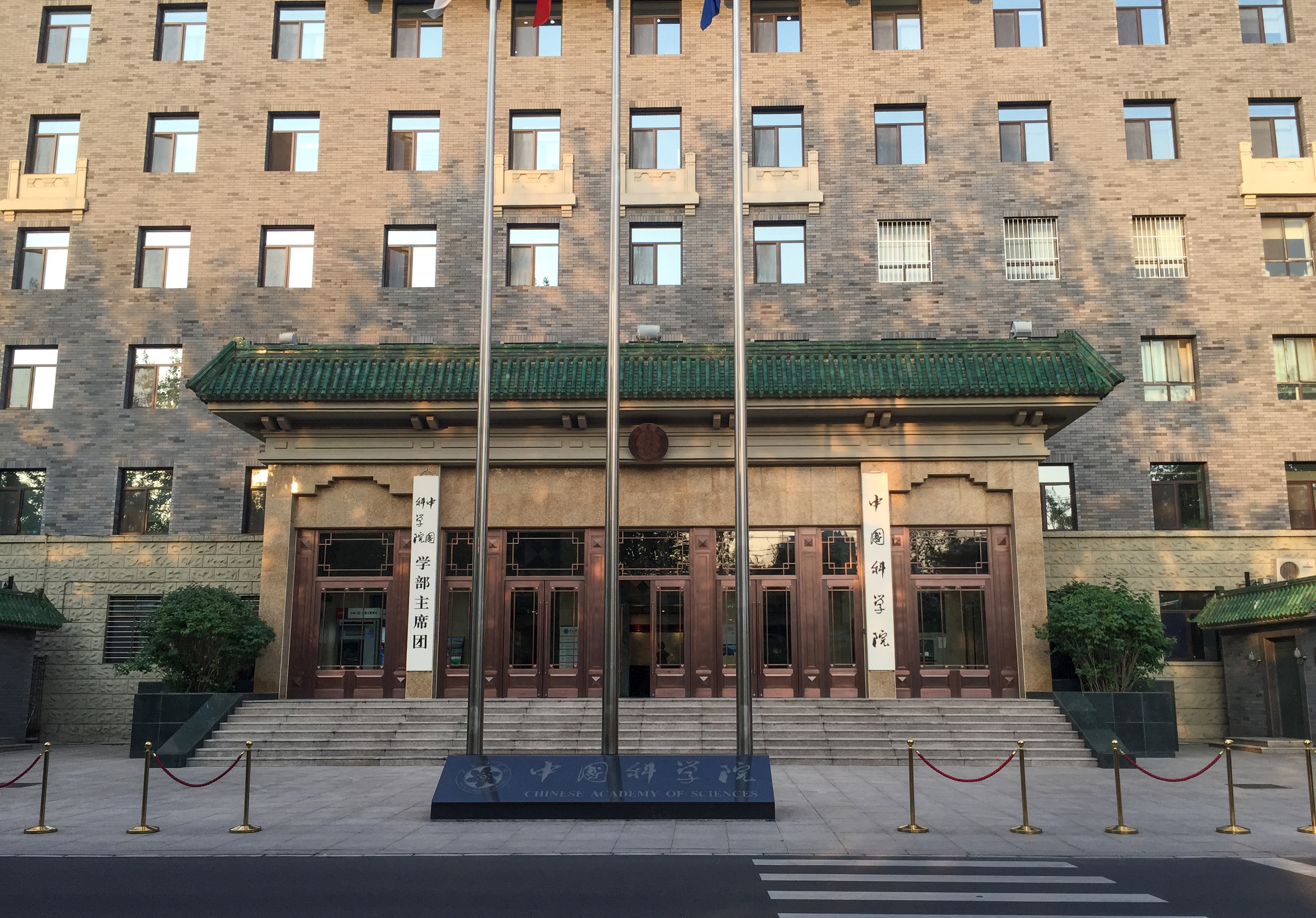
CAS headquarters building front in 2017

An academician of the Chinese Academy of Sciences (中国科学院院士) is a member of a division of the Academic Divisions of the Chinese Academy of Sciences (CASAD). The membership is the highest academic title in the People's Republic of China, and a lifelong prestigious honor awarded to Chinese scientists who have made significant contributions to science and technology. Academicians are elected from various research institutes and universities through strict and highly competitive process biannually. And the Chinese Academy of Sciences (CAS) is responsible for organizing and hosting this election.

== History ==
In 1955, the Academic Divisions of the Chinese Academy of Sciences (CASAD) was established and its first group of 233 members (called 學部委員 in Chinese) were produced.

During the Cultural Revolution (1966–1976), many members of academic divisions were denounced as "reactionary academic authorities" and persecuted.

In 1984, membership of academic divisions became the highest honorary title in the country in science and technology.

In October 1993, at the 11th Executive Meeting of the State Council of the People's Republic of China, the name of "membership of academic divisions of the Chinese Academy of Sciences (中国科学院学部委员)" were changed into 'Academician of the Chinese Academy of Sciences" (中国科学院院士). Since then, the academy has been positioned as the highest advisory body in science and technology of the country, and the Academician Conference has been held every two years.

In June 2006, the "Statute for Membership of the Chinese Academy of Sciences" was revised from "candidates who receive more than half of the votes of the voters will be elected" to "candidates who receive no less than two-thirds of the votes of the voters will be elected in order according to the number of additional seats in the divisions."

In the 2015 election of new members, officials at or above the department level (处级以上官员) were not allowed to become candidates.

Before 2014 only a maximum of 60 members could be inducted each time, but this restriction has since been removed by the newly amended Statute in 2016.

In February 2017, foreign members of the Chinese Academy of Sciences Yang Zhenning and Yao Qizhi were officially transferred to the domestic Chinese Academy of Sciences. This is the first time in the history of the Chinese Academy of Sciences that foreign academicians have proposed to transfer to the Chinese Academy of Sciences. In June 2023, Sun Licheng and Xie Xiaoliang were also transferred from foreign academicians of the Chinese Academy of Sciences to academicians of the Chinese Academy of Sciences.

As of November 2023, Chinese Academy of Sciences has 873 domestic academicians and 129 foreign academicians distributed in the six academic divisions of mathematics and physics, chemistry, life and medical sciences, earth sciences, IT-related sciences and technological sciences. According to current national regulations, the work benefits enjoyed by academicians of the Chinese Academy of Sciences (including medical care, travel, etc.) are equivalent to those at the vice-ministerial level.

== Election ==
The standards and requirements for members of the Chinese Academy of Sciences are "Chinese citizens who abide by the Constitution and laws of the People's Republic of China, uphold patriotic values, have good moral standing and decent academic integrity, and have made systematic and innovative achievements in the field of science and technology, as well as outstanding contributions to China's science and technology development or human civilization progress, may be nominated and elected as Members.", although foreign citizens may be elected as CAS foreign academicians. The election has been held 20 times in 1955, 1957, 1980, 1991, and every two years (odd-numbered years) since 1991. Candidates for academicians are recommended by academicians and relevant academic groups. The presidium of academic divisions may set up a special candidate recommendation group based on the needs of discipline development. Individual applications are not accepted.

The new academicians are elected by voting of all the academicians with voting rights after being reviewed and confirmed by each academic division. The election is conducted by equal and secret ballot, and the candidates who receives more than 2/3 of the valid votes will be elected.

== Responsibility ==
Academicians of the Chinese Academy of Sciences carry an obligation to advance science and technology, to develop a scientific and technological workforce, and to abide by the Statute for Membership of the Chinese Academy of Sciences, and uphold the honor of the Membership of the Chinese Academy of Sciences.

== Criticism ==
The academician membership system has been criticized as highly bureaucratic. Academicians receive government benefits equivalent to those enjoyed by vice-ministerial level officials. Additionally, academicians can receive numerous subsidies from the local governments in addition to statutory subsidies. Their opinions may carry more weight, which sometimes leads to academic monopolization.

94% of the members are male, and 6% are female.

== See also ==
- List of members of the Chinese Academy of Sciences
- List of foreign members of the Chinese Academy of Sciences
- Members of the two academies (China)
- Chinese Academy of Sciences
- Academician of Academia Sinica
- Academician of Chinese Academy of Engineering
