= Ming-Che Shih =

Agricultural researcher

Ming-Che Shih is an agricultural researcher.

== Career ==
Shih is a distinguished research fellow at the Agricultural Biotechnology Research Center of Academia Sinica.

Shih obtained his PhD from the University of Iowa in 1983. In 2022 Shih was elected to the Academia Sinica.
