= Mei-Yin Chou =

Taiwanese physicist (born 1958)

- 周美吟
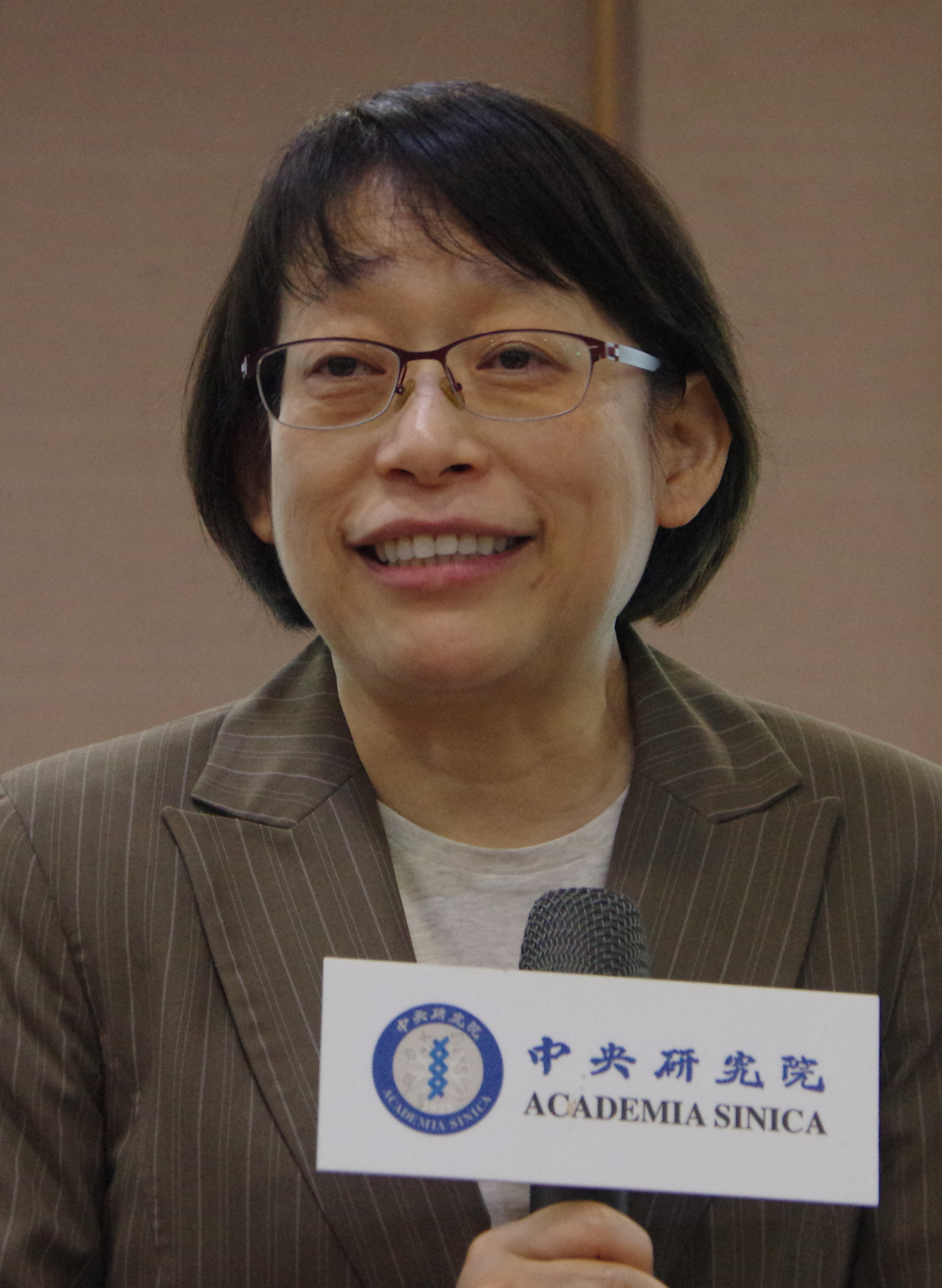
- Chou in 2018

Vice President of Academia Sinica
- In office 1 September 2016 – 18 June 2026
- President: James C. Liao
- Preceded by: Andrew H. J. Wang
- Succeeded by: Shin-Kun Peng

Personal details
- Born: 1958 (age 67–68) Sanchong, Taipei County, Taiwan
- Education: National Taiwan University (BS); University of California, Berkeley (MS, PhD)
- Scientific career
- Fields: Condensed matter physics
- Thesis: Electrons in Solids and Clusters (1986)

Mei-Yin Chou (Chinese: 周美吟; pinyin: Zhōu Měiyín; born 1958) is a Taiwanese physicist who was vice president of Academia Sinica from 2016 to 2026. She is a specialist in condensed matter physics and solid-state physics.

== Education ==
Chou graduated from National Taiwan University with a Bachelor of Science (B.S.) in physics in 1980. She then completed advanced studies in the United States at the University of California, Berkeley, where she earned her Master of Science (M.S.) in physics in 1983 and her Ph.D. in physics in 1986. Her doctoral dissertation, completed under physics professor Marvin L. Cohen, was titled, "Electrons in Solids and Clusters". She published 12 academic papers before she completed her doctorate at Berkeley.

== Acadenic career ==
After receiving her doctorate, Chou completed postdoctoral research with Exxon, and joined the Georgia Institute of Technology faculty in 1989. Chou received a two-year fellowship from the Alfred P. Sloan Foundation between 1990 and 1992, as well as a five-year fellowship from the David and Lucile Packard Foundation (1990–1995).

Chou became an associate professor at Georgia Tech in 1993, and was promoted to full professor in 1998. Chou held the Advance Professorship in Science from 2002 to 2006, and chaired the physics department between 2005 and 2010. She returned to Taiwan to assume the directorship of the Institute of Atomic and Molecular Sciences at Academia Sinica, and took a joint adjunct professorship at National Taiwan University.

In 2013, Chou was awarded the Outstanding Award of the Taiwan Outstanding Women in Science Awards.

She was elected a fellow of the American Physical Society in 2002, and elected to membership within Academia Sinica in 2014. Chou was considered one of three finalists for the position of president of Academia Sinica in 2016. After Kuo Way withdrew from consideration and James C. Liao was selected, Chou was appointed one of three vice presidents. In late 2017, Chou was one of eight finalists considered for the position of National Taiwan University president. Chou remained in the running until the final round of five candidates.

== Personal life ==
Chou is married to Ye-Hwa Evan Chen. They have a son and a daughter; her son earned a master's degree from the University of Washington and her daughter graduated from Harvard University with a degree in mathematics.
