= Academician of Chinese Academy of Engineering =

Academic award

Academician of Chinese Academy of Engineering (中国工程院院士), or Members of Chinese Academy of Engineering, is the highest academic title in engineering science and technology in the People's Republic of China, and is a lifelong honor for experts and scholars who have made great contributions to the development of China's engineering science and technology. The academy consists of members, senior members, and foreign members. The election of new members is normally held every two years through voting at the General Assembly.

== History ==
In 1993, the State Council of the People's Republic of China decided to change the name of "members of academic divisions" (学部委员) into "academicians" (院士) of the Chinese Academy of Sciences, and at the same time announced the establishment of the Chinese Academy of Engineering. In 1994, The Chinese Academy of Engineering produced its first batch of 96 academicians, 30 of whom were academicians of the Chinese Academy of Sciences.

In 1997, the Chinese Academy of Engineering elected 116 new members; another 113 new members were elected in 1999, followed by 81 members in 2001, 58 in 2003, 50 in 2005, 33 in 2007, and 48 in 2009. In 2015, 70 new members were elected. In 2021, 84 new academicians were elected. In 2023, 74 new academicians were elected to the Chinese Academy of Engineering.

== Elections ==
The election of new members (academicians) is conducted biennially, and the number of newly elected academicians each time is decided by the Presidium of the Chinese Academy of Engineering. The senior engineers, research fellows, professors, and other scholars or specialists of similar ranks, who have Chinese citizenship (including those living in Taiwan, Hong Kong, Macao, and overseas) and have made significant and creative achievements and contributions in the fields of engineering and technological sciences, can be nominated for membership election of the academy. Foreign scientists with a high international reputation and contribution to the development of China's engineering science and technology may be candidates for foreign academicians.

The nominated candidates are reviewed by external peer experts organized by the Chinese Academy of Engineering. The selected candidates are then submitted to the General Assembly of Academicians for election by secret ballot. The number of academicians participating in the general election must exceed one-half of the total number of academicians with voting rights in the entire academy; candidates who obtain more than one-half of the voting votes will be elected in order according to the number of votes they obtain, based on the number of additional seats in each academic department.

When an academician's behavior violates national laws and endangers national interests, their title of academician may be revoked.

== Obligations and rights ==
Academicians must love the motherland and support the leadership of the Chinese Communist Party, actively promote the research of engineering science, and technology, and continuously make achievements. They must maintain scientific ethics, pursue truth, and actively cultivate talents. They are also required to undertake consultation, review, and evaluation tasks of the Chinese Academy of Engineering and its departments; and participate in science popularization activities.

Academicians have the right to make proposals on the development and decision-making of national engineering science and technology and can nominate and elect academicians and foreign academicians at academician meetings. They are entitled to enjoy relevant treatment.

== Senior academicians ==
Academicians who are 80 years old or above are awarded the title of Senior Academician. Senior academicians continue to enjoy the rights and obligations of consultation, review, and promotion of academic exchanges and popularization of science; but they will no longer hold leadership positions in the academy and its departments, nor participate in the nomination and election of academician candidates, though they can freely participate in academician meetings.

== Foreign academicians ==
Foreign academicians have the right to make suggestions on the development of China's engineering science and technology and the work of the Academy. They may be invited to attend relevant meetings and academic activities organized by the Academy and its departments and may receive publications donated by the Academy, though not to participate in election activities. Foreign academicians who obtain Chinese nationality may become academicians of the academy.

== Expelled academicians ==
- Li Ning
- Meng Wei
- Cao Yaofeng
- Wang An

== List of academicians ==
As of July 2026, there are 979 living members in the academy, divided into nine academic divisions:

- Mechanical and Vehicle Engineering: 137 members
- Information and Electronic Engineering: 147 members
- Chemical, Metallurgical, and Materials Engineering: 123 members
- Energy and Mining Engineering: 141 members
- Civil and Hydraulic Engineering and Architecture: 115 members
- Light Industry and Environmental Engineering: 79 members
- Agriculture: 96 members
- Medicine and Health: 135 members
- Engineering Management: 85 members

Additionally, there are 145 living foreign members

== See also ==
- List of members of the Chinese Academy of Engineering
- Chinese Academy of Engineering
- Academician of the Chinese Academy of Sciences
- Academician of Academia Sinica
