= National Changhua Girls' Senior High School =

Public school in Taiwan

Coordinates: 24.0813°N 120.5437°E

Changhua Girls' Senior High School
- 國立彰化女子高級中學
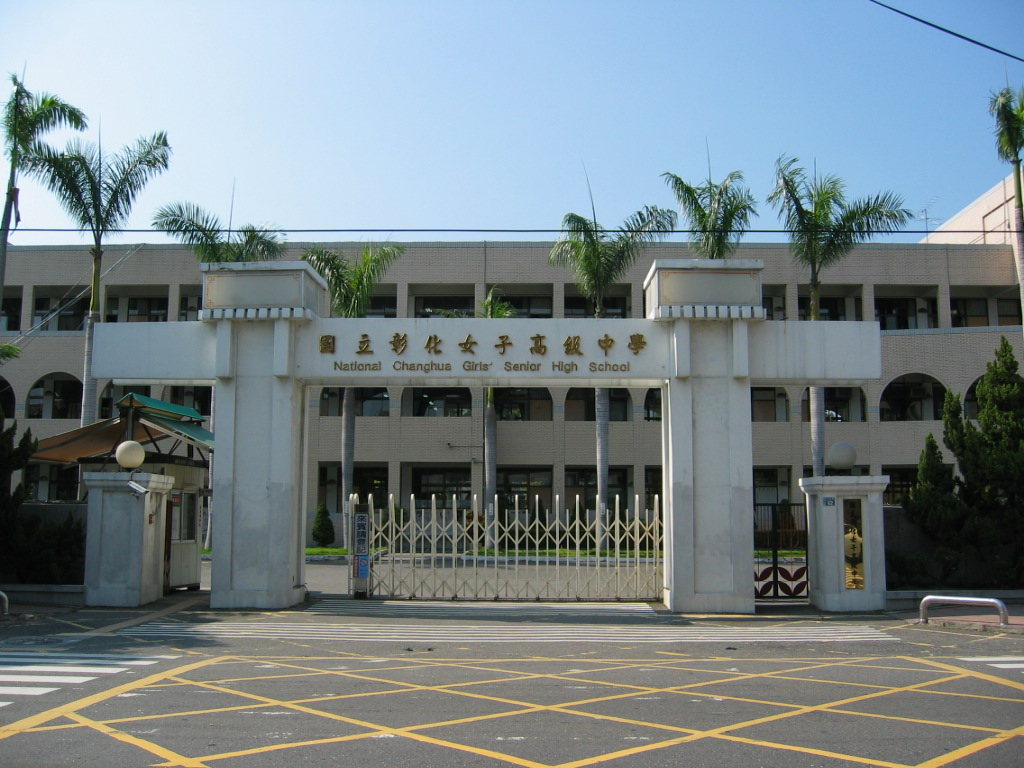
- School entrance
- No.62, Guangfu Rd., Changhua City, Changhua County, 500, Taiwan (R.O.C.)

Information
- Type: Public
- Motto: Honesty, Diligence, Dignity, Patience
- Founded: 1919
- Principal: Cheng Yao-Chung Ph.D.
- Staff: 136
- Enrollment: 1767
- Campus: Downtown
- Area: 36,949 m^{2} (397,720 sq ft)

The National Changhua Girls' Senior High School (CHGSH; Chinese: 國立彰化女子高級中學) is a high school in Changhua City, Changhua County, Taiwan. There are 45 classes with 1,900 students and 140 faculty members.

== History ==
The school was founded in 1919. It has had several well-known writers among its alumna including Li Ang and Ling Yueh. The artist Li Zhong-Sheng was a faculty member at the school.

== Principals of the school ==
=== Japanese Colonial Period ===
Since 1919, six Japanese were assigned as principals of the school.

=== Since World War II ===
Since 1945, the school has been led by fourteen principals and all of them have been women, except the present principal, Kong Jian-Kuo.

- Chou Ze Lan (丑澤蘭 December 1945~May 1946)
- Huang Jun (黃 濬 June 1946~February 1947)
- Huang Fu Gui (皇甫珪 March 1947~June 1950)
- Lin Shi Ge (林詩閣 July 1950~August 1950)
- Fu Xiao Fong (傅曉峰 August 1950~January 1953)
- Wu Zi Wo (吳子我 February 1953~February 1956)
- Huang Dong Sheng (黃東生 February 1956~June 1957)
- Ye Shu Ren (葉淑仁 June 1957~June 1959)
- Shen Ya Li (沈雅利 June 1959~August 1966)
- Jing Sheng Ran (景生然 August 1966~September 1968)
- Bu Qing Kui (卜慶葵 September 1968~August 1979)
- Xie Yu Ying (謝玉英 August 1979~January 1992)
- He Yu Qing (賀玉琴 February 1992~January 1998)
- Chen Yue Qiong (陳月瓊 February 1998~January 2000)
- Xiao Hui Lan (蕭惠蘭 February 2000~July 2004)
- Kong Jian-Kuo (孔建國 August 2004~July 2012)
- Cheng Yao-Chung Ph.D.(鄭曜忠 August 2012~present)

== Information ==
- The school has had many names, becoming the National Changhua Girls' Senior High School in 2000.
- To promote the creed of "learning in serving," students, teachers, alumnae and parents are encouraged to do volunteer services.
- School clubs include a marching band and honor guard clubs. School has speech contestants in Chinese, English, and Taiwanese who attend speech contests.
- The school's foreign language courses are taught by foreign teachers. Educational tours to Japan are held every year.
- The school's alumnae are scattered throughout Taiwan and overseas, and there is an alumnae association.

== Facilities ==
- The school boasts a natural environment with green trees. The school makes efforts to plant vegetation and beautify the campus. There are "Blackies" (Malay night herons) on the campus.
- The school was chosen as the model school of environmental protection by Taiwan's Department of Environmental Protection.
- The school has a library with a Video On Demand (VOD) system, set up to facilitate students’ learning at any time and to provide special programs as well as movies every month.
- The school dormitory can accommodate 500 students.

== Annual events ==
=== October ===
- College visits for the second graders
- Target practice for the second graders in Cheng-Kung Hill
- The performance of school band and honor guards in Double Ten Day

=== December ===
- Anniversary celebrations and sports meet

=== January ===
- Year-end banquet

=== May ===
- School Carnival, held biennially

=== June ===
- The exhibition of students’ clubs
- Graduation

== Visits to and from Japan ==
=== 2004 ===
- In May, 71 teachers and students visited Hashimoto High School in Wakayama Prefecture and Prefectural Shingu Senior High School in the Fukuoka Prefecture.

=== 2005 ===
- In January, the Director of Education Committee of Japan, visited Changhwa Girls’ Senior High.
- In May, 114 teachers and students from the school visited Himeji Nishi Senior High School in Hyōgo Prefecture and Osaka Prefectural Kitano High School.
- In August, ten staff who were principal, teachers, and students' parents visited Changhwa.
- For five days in September, principal Kong went to Japan for the Educational Communication Conference. On September 9, principal Kong visited Matsumoto Agatagaoka high school in Nagano Prefecture.

=== 2006 ===
- In May, 155 teachers and students visited the Director of Education Committee of Japan and Prefectural Shingu Senior High School and Seishoukai High School.

=== 2007 ===
- In May, 153 teachers and students visited Himeji Nishi Senior High School in Hyōgo Prefecture.
- In December, two officials from Japan National Tourism Organization and one official of Educational Bureau visited.

=== 2008 ===
- In May, an official from Japan National Tourism Organization's publicity department came to visit. That same month, 190 teachers and students visited Hashimoto High School and Prefectural Shingu Senior High School.

== Notable alumni ==
- Liu Ts'ui-jung, historian
- Li Ang, writer
- Ling Yueh, writer

== See also ==
- Education in Taiwan
