= Language and Linguistics (journal) =

- Discipline: Linguistics
- Language: Chinese, English
- Edited by: Edith Aldridge

Publication details
- History: 2000–present
- Publisher: John Benjamins Publishing Company
- Frequency: Quarterly
- Open access: Yes
- Impact factor: 0.2 (2024)

Standard abbreviations
- ISO 4: Lang. Linguist.

Indexing
- ISSN: 1606-822X (print); 2309-5067 (web)

Links
- Journal homepage; All issues

Language and Linguistics is an open-access peer-reviewed academic journal of linguistics, publishing research on languages of East Asia and Asia-Pacific, specifically those belonging to the language families of Sino-Tibetan, Austronesian, and Austroasiatic. It is the flagship publication of the Institute of Linguistics at the Academia Sinica, which publishes the journal in collaboration with John Benjamins Publishing Company since 2016, after a brief period of partnership with Sage Publishing from 2014 to 2016.

The journal is distinguished for publishing regularly in both English and Traditional Chinese, with the latter being dedicated to on the July issue, while the other three issues are released in English. It is open access formerly under a CC BY-NC 4.0 license, after transitioning into a CC-BY License starting from January 2023.
