= Members of the two academies =

In China, the Chinese Academy of Sciences (CAS) and the Chinese Academy of Engineering (CAE) are often collectively referred to as the "Two Academies" because of their lofty status in science and technology. Academicians of the "Two Academies" are also often collectively called Members of the two academies, Academicians of the two academies or CAS-CAE Academicians (Chinese: 两院院士; pinyin: Liǎngyuàn yuànshì). These academicians are leading scientists and engineers in their respective fields. The selection of academicians is based on their outstanding academic and professional achievements, innovative capabilities, and contributions to society.

== Membership of the Chinese Academy of Sciences ==
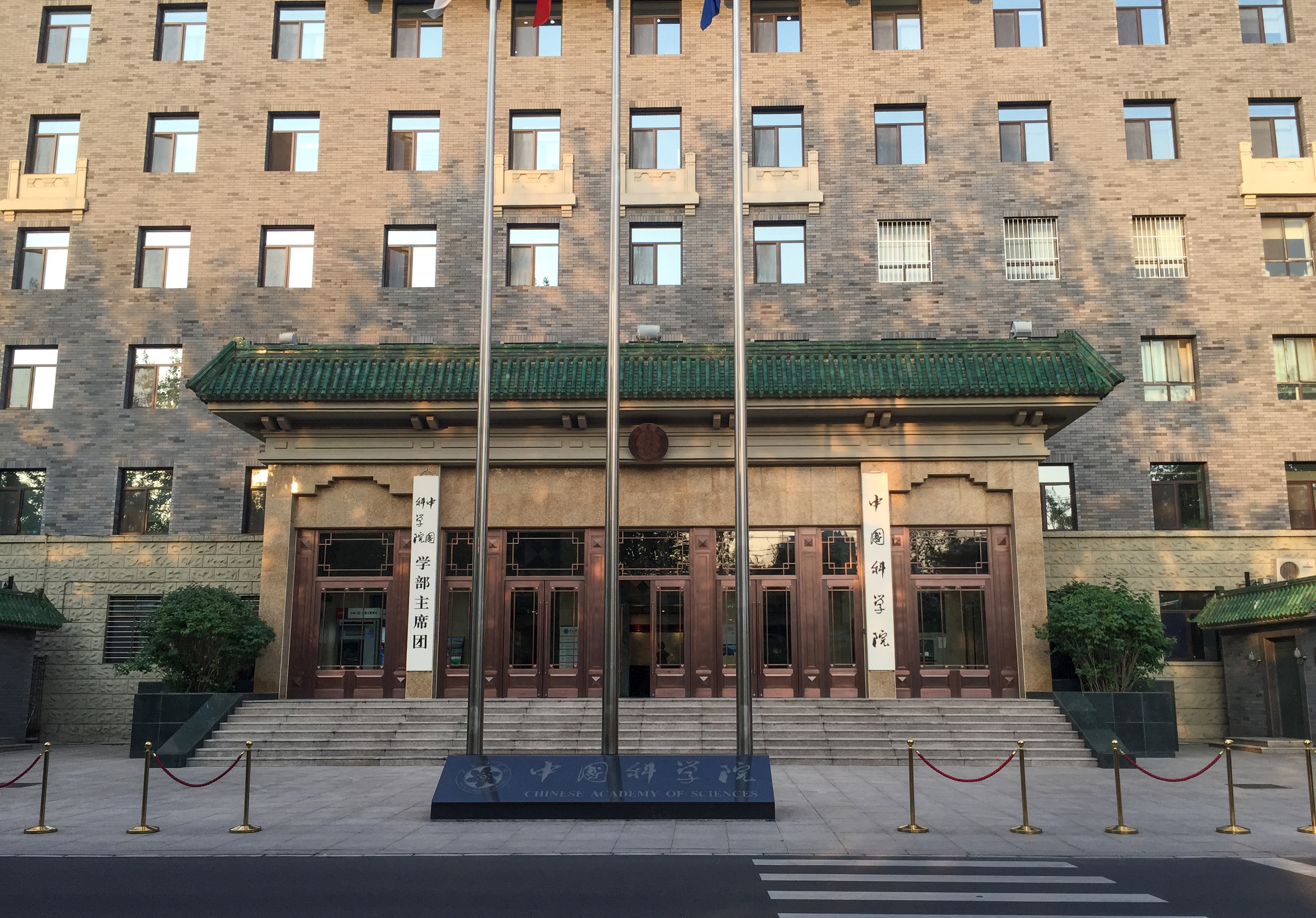
CAS headquarters building front in 2017

Membership of the Chinese Academy of Sciences, also known by the title Academician of the Chinese Academy of Sciences (中国科学院院士), is a lifelong honor given to Chinese scientists who have made significant achievements in various fields. According to the Bylaws for Members of the Chinese Academy of Sciences, it is the highest academic title in China. A formal CAS member must hold Chinese citizenship, although foreign citizens may be elected as CAS foreign academicians. Members older than 80 are designated as "senior members" and may no longer hold leading positions in the organization.

Academicians of the Chinese Academy of Sciences carry an obligation to advance science and technology, to advocate and uphold scientific spirit, to develop a scientific and technological workforce, to attend member meetings and receive consultation and evaluation tasks, and to promote international exchanges and cooperation. Academicians can give suggestions and influence Chinese state policy related to science and technology.

The title with similar nature and function at the Chinese Academy of Social Sciences is “Academician (学部委员; 學部委員) of the Chinese Academy of Social Sciences”.。

== Membership of Chinese Academy of Engineering ==
Membership of Chinese Academy of Engineering is the highest academic title in engineering science and technology in China. It is a lifelong honor and must be elected by existing members. The academy consists of members, senior members and foreign members, who are distinguished and recognized for their respective field of engineering.

As of January 2020, the academy has 920 Chinese members, in addition to 93 foreigner members.

The senior engineers, professors and other scholars or specialists, who shall have the Chinese citizenship (including those who reside in Taiwan, Hong Kong Special Administrative Region, Macao Special Administrative Region and overseas) and who have made significant and creative achievements and contributions in the fields of engineering and technological sciences, are qualified for the membership of the academy.

The election of new members (academicians) is conducted biennially. Total numbers of members to be elected in each election is decided by the governing body of the academy. Examination and election of the candidates are done in every Academy Division and the voting is anonymous. The results of the voting is then examined and validated by the governing board.

== See also ==
- Academician of the Chinese Academy of Sciences
- List of members of the Chinese Academy of Sciences
- List of members of the Chinese Academy of Engineering
