= Andrew H. J. Wang =

Taiwanese biochemist (born 1945)

Wang Hui-jun
- 王惠鈞
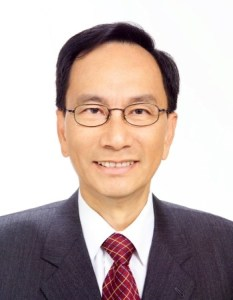
- Official portrait, 2016

Vice President of Academia Sinica
- In office 1 December 2015 – 1 September 2016 Serving with Wang Fan-sen and Wang Yu
- President: Chi-Huey Wong; Wang Fan-sen (acting)
- Preceded by: Chen Chien-jen
- Succeeded by: Fu-Tong Liu
- In office 19 October 2006 – 18 October 2011
- President: Chi-Huey Wong
- Preceded by: Michael M. C. Lai
- Succeeded by: Chen Chien-jen

Personal details
- Born: 29 November 1945 (age 80)
- Education: National Taiwan University (BS, MS); University of Illinois at Urbana–Champaign (PhD)

Wang Hui-jun (Chinese: 王惠鈞; pinyin: Wáng Huìjūn; born 29 November 1945), also known by his English name Andrew H. J. Wang, is a Taiwanese biochemist who served as the vice president of Academia Sinica from 2006 to 2011 and from 2015 to 2016.

== Early life and education ==
Wang was raised in Chiayi, Taiwan. He graduated from National Taiwan University with a Bachelor of Science (B.S.) and a Master of Science (M.S.) in 1967 and 1970, respectively. He then completed doctoral studies in the United States, where he earned his Ph.D. in chemistry from the University of Illinois at Urbana–Champaign in 1974 on a grant awarded by the National Science Foundation. His doctoral dissertation, completed under chemist Iain C. Paul, was titled, "Structural investigations of high molecular-weight antibiotics and of epsilon-nucleosides".

== Career ==
Wang was a research scientist at the Massachusetts Institute of Technology between 1974 and 1988, when he returned to UIUC as a faculty member. Wang returned to Taiwan in 2000 for a position at Academia Sinica. Wang is noted for his research into PTPN3-protein kinase 12 complex and has identified ICP11 as a DNA mimic protein.

Wang was elected a fellow of the American Society for Biochemistry and Molecular Biology and American Institute of Chemists in 1987. The next year, Wang was elected a fellow of the American Association for the Advancement of Science. Wang's election as a member of Academia Sinica took place in 2000, and he became a fellow of The World Academy of Sciences in 2005.

Wang served as president of the Taiwan Society of Biochemistry and Molecular Biology between 2001 and 2004, the Biophysical Society of the Republic of China from 2001 to 2007, and the Taiwan Proteomics Society from 2003 and 2006. Wang was appointed one of three vice presidents of Academia Sinica under Wong Chi-huey in 2006. He was president of the Federation of Asian Oceanian Biochemists and Molecular Biologists between 2011 and 2013, and took office as president of the International Union of Biochemistry and Molecular Biology in 2018. In October 2018, Wang was appointed inaugural director of the National Biotechnology Research Park, a position he took in an acting capacity. Wang was nominated for a Presidential Science Prize in 2021.
