= Globo H =

Globo-series glycosphingolipid antigen

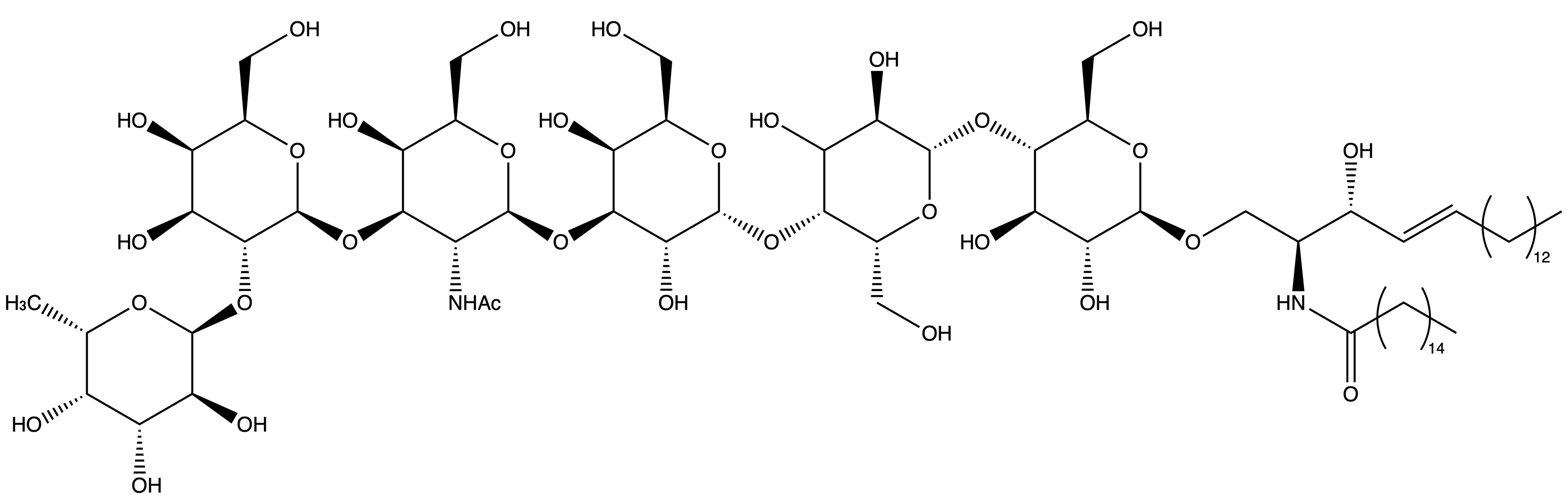

Names
- IUPAC name N-((2S,3R,E)-1-(((2R,3R,4R,5S,6R)-5-(((2S,3R,4R,5R,6R)-5-(((2R,3R,4S,5S,6R)-4-(((2S,3R,4R,5R,6R)-3-acetamido-4-(((2R,3R,4S,5R,6R)-4,5-dihydroxy-6-(hydroxymethyl)-3-(((2S,3S,4R,5S,6S)-3,4,5-trihydroxy-6-methyltetrahydro-2H-pyran-2-yl)oxy)tetrahydro-2H-pyran-2-yl)oxy)-5-hydroxy-6-(hydroxymethyl)tetrahydro-2H-pyran-2-yl)oxy)-3,5-dihydroxy-6-(hydroxymethyl)tetrahydro-2H-pyran-2-yl)oxy)-3,4-dihydroxy-6-(hydroxymethyl)tetrahydro-2H-pyran-2-yl)oxy)-3,4-dihydroxy-6-(hydroxymethyl)tetrahydro-2H-pyran-2-yl)oxy)-3-hydroxyoctadec-4-en-2-yl)palmitamide
- Other names: globohexaosylceramide; α-L-Fuc-(1→2)-β-D-Gal-(1→3)-β-D-GalNAc-(1→3)-α-D-Gal-(1→4)-β-D-Gal-(1→4)-α-D-GlcOCeramide

Identifiers
CAS Number	77538-31-9
3D model (JSmol)	Interactive image
ChEBI	CHEBI:62361
ChemSpider	129562481
PubChem CID	165360187
CompTox Dashboard (EPA)	DTXSID601336789
- InChI: InChI=1S/C72H130N2O32/c1-5-7-9-11-13-15-17-19-21-23-25-27-29-31-42(81)41(74-48(82)32-30-28-26-24-22-20-18-16-14-12-10-8-6-2)38-95-68-59(92)56(89)62(46(36-78)100-68)102-70-60(93)57(90)63(47(37-79)101-70)103-71-61(94)65(53(86)45(35-77)98-71)105-67-49(73-40(4)80)64(52(85)44(34-76)97-67)104-72-66(55(88)51(84)43(33-75)99-72)106-69-58(91)54(87)50(83)39(3)96-69/h29,31,39,41-47,49-72,75-79,81,83-94H,5-28,30,32-38H2,1-4H3,(H,73,80)(H,74,82)/b31-29+/t39-,41-,42+,43+,44+,45+,46+,47+,49+,50+,51-,52+,53-,54+,55-,56+,57+,58-,59+,60+,61+,62+,63-,64+,65-,66+,67-,68+,69-,70-,71+,72-/m0/s1 Key: NQUSQNBGWFMOFP-PBNVMRQJSA-N
- SMILES: CCCCCCCCCCCCC\C=C\[C@@H](O)[C@H](CO[C@@H]1O[C@H](CO)[C@@H](O[C@@H]2O[C@H](CO)[C@H](O[C@H]3O[C@H](CO)[C@H](O)[C@H](O[C@@H]4O[C@H](CO)[C@@H](O)[C@H](O[C@@H]5O[C@H](CO)[C@H](O)[C@H](O)[C@H]5O[C@@H]5O[C@@H](C)[C@@H](O)[C@@H](O)[C@@H]5O)[C@H]4NC(C)=O)[C@H]3O)[C@H](O)[C@H]2O)[C@H](O)[C@H]1O)NC(CCCCCCCCCCCCCCC)=O
- Except where otherwise noted, data are given for materials in their standard state (at 25 °C [77 °F], 100 kPa). Infobox references

Globo H (globohexaosylceramide) is a globo-series glycosphingolipid antigen that is present on the outer membrane of some cancer cells. Globo H is not expressed in normal tissue cells, but is expressed in a number of types of cancers, including cancers of the breast, prostate, and pancreas. Globo H's exclusivity for cancer cells makes it a target of interest for cancer therapies.

== Structure ==
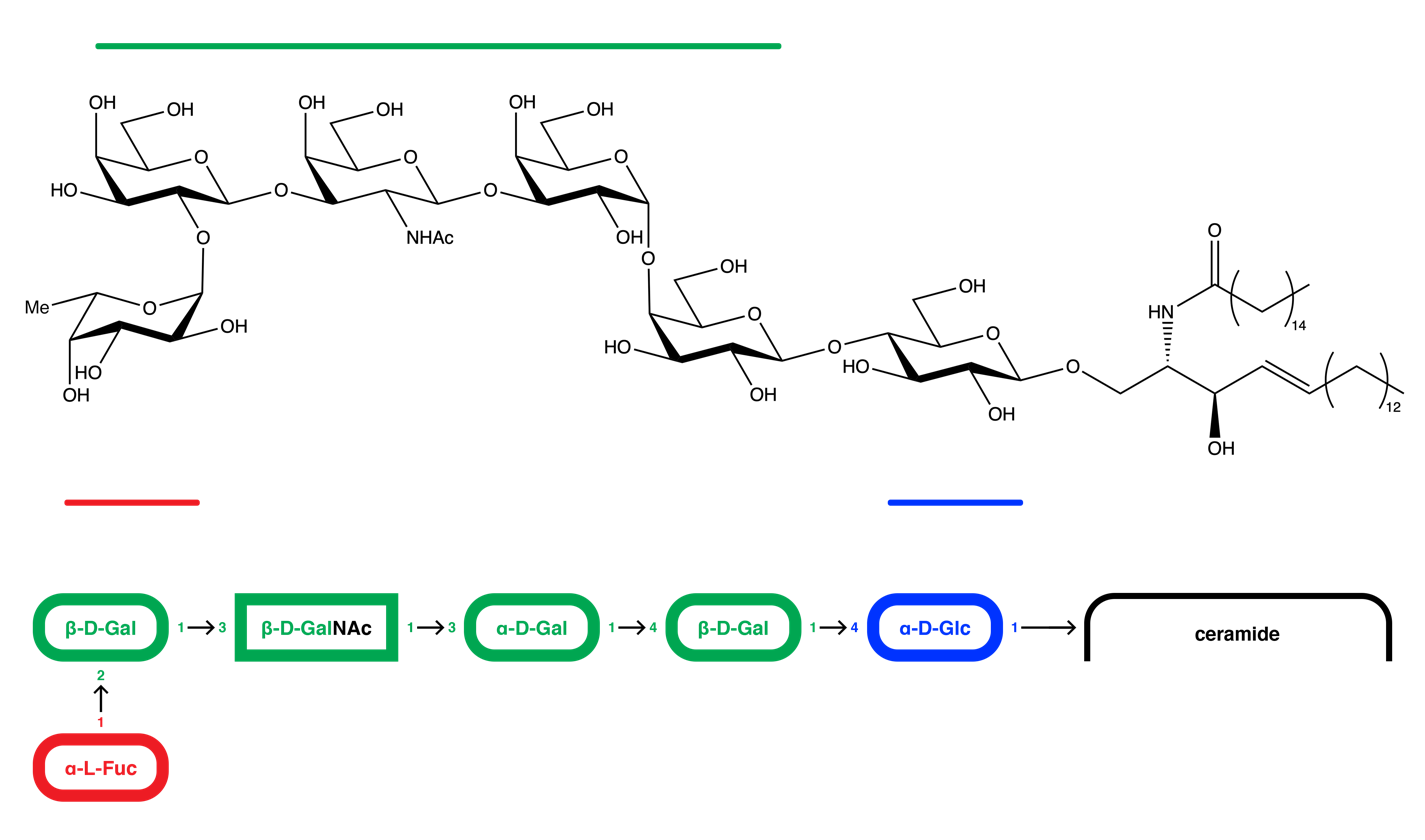
Chemical Structure of Globo H

Defined by the monoclonal antibody MBr1, Globo H has been isolated from breast cancer cell line MCF-7, and its structure has been determined through several analyses, including NMR spectroscopy and methylation analysis. Globo H consists of a hexasaccharide of the structure Fucα(1-2)Galβ(1-3)GalNAcβ(1-3)Galα(1-4)Galβ(1-4)Glcβ(1) with a ceramide attached to its terminal glucose ring at the 1 position in a beta linkage.

== Synthesis ==
=== Biosynthesis ===
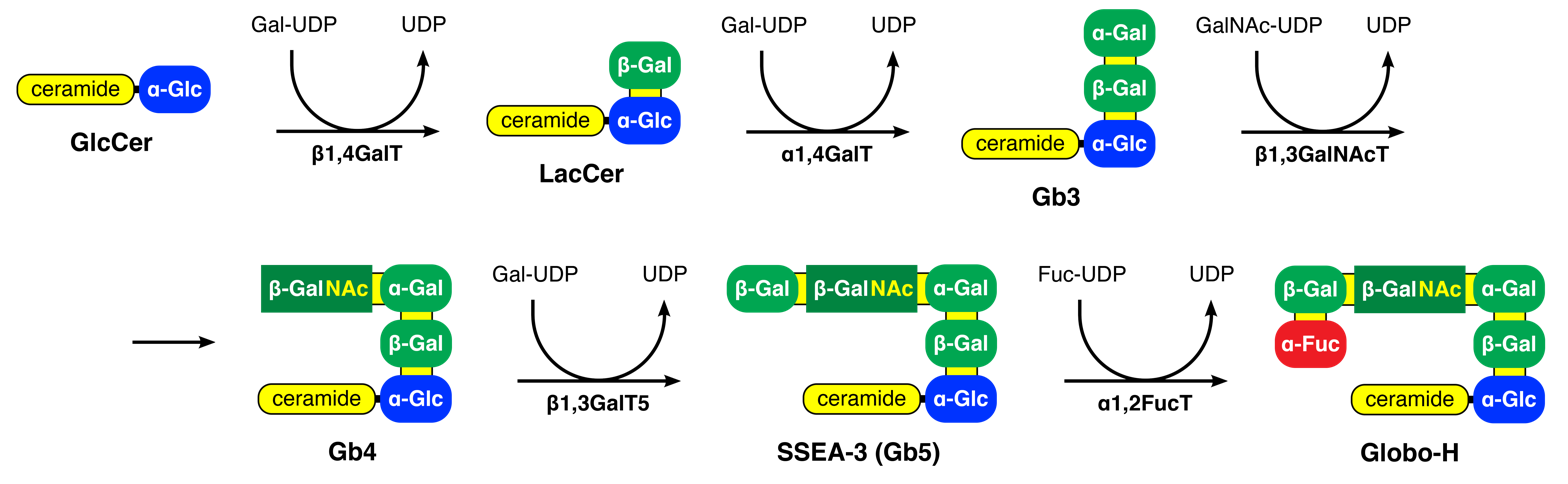
Biosynthesis of Globo H

Globo H's biosynthetic pathway is involved in the synthesis pathways of other globo-series glycosphingolipid antigens that are also specific to cancer cells, including stage-specific embryonic antigen-3 (SSEA3) and stage-specific embryonic antigen-4 (SSEA4). The biosynthetic pathway of these antigens includes the enzyme β 1,3-galactosyltransferase V (β3GalT5). β3GalT5 catalyzes the galactosylation of globoside-4 (Gb4) to SSEA3. SSEA3 can then be converted to SSEA4 by sialyltransferase adding a sialic acid group to its end, or it can be converted to Globo H by fucosyltransferase adding a fucose ring to its end. Playing a part in the formation of three different cancer-specific antigens, β3GalT5 is of particular interest in its relevance to cancer treatment, and it has been shown to be critical for cancer cell survival.

=== Chemical Synthesis ===
In order to study its potential as a cancer therapy target, Globo H has been synthesized in the laboratory. One synthesis is achieved by first building two trisaccharides from their component sugars, and then linking them. The trisaccharides, with most of their functional groups protected to prevent side reactions, are linked by creating the GalNAcβ(1-3)Gal bond. A thioethyl group is added to the 1 position on one of the protected galactose rings, and in the presence of methyl triflate, this reacts with the hydroxyl group on the 3 position of the other galactose to link the trisaccharides and form the hexasaccharide. The ceramide is added to the 1 position of the terminal glucose ring after hexasaccharide formation.

== Globo H as a Therapeutic Target ==
As a Tumor Associated Carbohydrate Antigen (TACA), Globo-H is a promising clinical target for immunotherapy. While absent in normal tissues, the glycosphingolipid is overexpressed in a variety of epithelial cancer cell types including human pancreatic, gastric, lung, colorectal, esophageal, and breast tumors.

=== Globo H Anticancer Vaccines ===
Globo-H's TACA character allows for its utilization as an anticancer vaccine, inducing antibody response against the epitope. The resulting humoral immunity could enable the selective eradication of Globo H-presenting tumors. The Taiwanese biopharma company OBI Pharma, Inc., was first to develop Adagloxad Simolenin (OBI-822), a Globo H hexasaccharide conjugated with the immunostimulatory carrier protein KLH. The Phase III GLORIA study is underway evaluating the carbohydrate-based immunogen's effects in high risk triple-negative breast cancer (TNBC) patients with an estimated completion date in 2027.

Alternative vaccine conjugates have been developed which avoid issues associated with the protein carrier KLH by substituting it with a lipid or carbohydrate-based carrier. Examples include the use of lipid A derivatives or entirely carbohydrate vaccine conjugates such as Globo H-PS A1

=== Anti-Globo H Antibodies ===
Globo H-targeting antibodies are another strategy currently being evaluated in the cancer therapeutic space. OBI Pharma's OBI-888 is a humanized IgG1 antibody that selectively binds to the Globo H antigen among other Globo series glycosphingolipids such as SSEA-3 and SSEA-4. Additionally, in vivo studies of OBI-888 in various Globo H-positive (GH^{+}) xenografts models showed promising tumor growth inhibition results. OBI-888's human Phase I/II study for the treatment of metastatic and locally advanced solid tumors is estimated to finish in December 2022.

Based on OBI-888, the first-in-class antibody-drug conjugate (ADC) 0BI-999 was additionally developed, linking OBI-888 to monomethyl auristatin E, a synthetic antineoplastic agent. The ADC is currently undergoing phase II trial in patients with advanced solid tumors, with an estimated completion date in Dec 2023. In Dec 2019 & Jan 2020, OBI-999 was granted two Orphan Drug Designations by the FDA for the treatment of pancreatic and gastric cancer.
