= Philip LF Liu =

American engineer

Philip Li-Fan Liu (Chinese: 劉立方) is an American engineer, currently the Class of 1912 Professor at Cornell University, the Kwoh-Ting Lee Chair Professorship Chair Professor at National Central University and also a distinguished professor at National University of Singapore.

He is a fellow of the American Society of Civil Engineers and American Geophysical Union. He was elected a member of the US National Academy of Engineering in 2015 for coastal engineering research, education, computer modeling and leadership for tsunami and wave damage. Liu is also an academician of Academia Sinica.
