= Academician of Academia Sinica =

Honorary title in Taiwan

Academician of Academia Sinica (Chinese: 中央研究院院士; pinyin: Zhōngyāng Yánjiùyuàn yuànshì), or Membership of Academia Sinica, is a life-long honorary title granted by Academia Sinica and the highest academic honor in the Republic of China, though not a remunerated position.

== Responsibilities ==
Being a member of the Academia Sinica is merely an honor and they normally do not hold any position or receive any substantial remuneration. The only event that members are required to attend is the biennial academician convocation. Although academicians do not hold any position in Academia Sinica, many of them were elected while serving as research fellows in Academia Sinica, or served as research fellows or corresponding research fellows after being elected. Therefore, the ratio of academicians who also serve as research fellows is quite high.

The powers of academicians are as follows: to elect academicians and honorary academicians; elect Council Members; formulate national academic research policies; and carry out academic planning, surveying, reviewing, and research as authorized by the government and relevant organizations.

== Election ==
When the Academia Sinica was established in 1928, the first president, Tsai Yuan-Pei had the idea of granting membership and honorary membership to scholars who had made great contributions to their fields of research. The first batch of academicians were elected in China mainland in 1948, before the Academia Sinica moved to Taiwan due to the Chinese Civil War. Among these academicians, only a small number moved to Taiwan with the Nationalist government. The second batch of academicians was elected in 1958. So far, twenty-six groups have been elected, meeting on twenty-seven convocations, with a total of 392 members.

According to the current regulations, members of the Academia Sinica are elected every two years at the Convocation of Academicians. Candidates are divided among the four research divisions of Mathematics and Physical Sciences, Engineering Sciences, Life Sciences, and Humanities and Social Sciences. The number of new members elected each time is no more than 40, with a maximum of ten members in each group.

Candidates for academicians can be nominated by universities, prestigious professional associations and institutions; or by at least 5 Academicians and Council Members of Academia Sinica. Candidates must be scientists who either (1) have made outstanding contributions to their areas of research; or (2) have been an outstanding leader of their research institutes or have been a principal investigator with outstanding achievements for at least five years. Starting from 2023, it is clearly required that candidates for academicians must have sole or dual citizenship of the Republic of China, while honorary academicians will continue to have no restrictions on nationality. The review committee will vote by secret ballot via correspondence to enter the "preliminary list". The Council will then vote at the meeting to decide on the official candidates for the final vote in the academician convocation.

== List of current academicians ==
As of September 2026, Academia Sinica had a total of 299 academicians, distributed in the four divisions of Mathematics and Physical Sciences (73), Engineering Sciences (66), Life Sciences (99), and Humanities and Social Sciences (61).

== See also ==
- Academia Sinica
- Academician of the Chinese Academy of Sciences
- Academician of Chinese Academy of Engineering
