= Chi-Huey Wong =

Taiwanese-American biochemist (born 1948)

- 翁啟惠
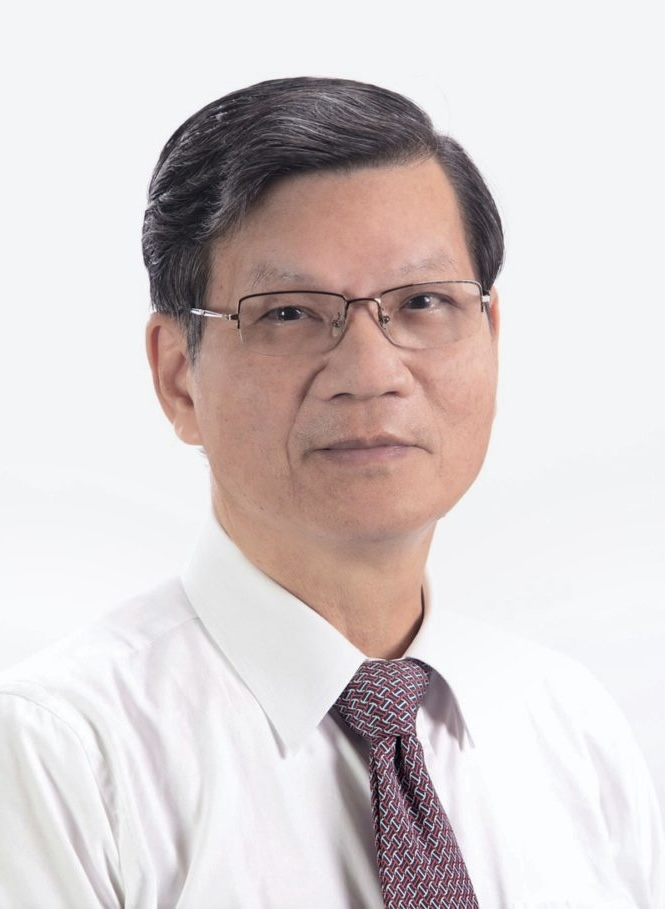

8th President of the Academia Sinica
- In office 19 October 2006 – 10 May 2016
- Vice President: Andrew H. J. Wang; Chen Chien-jen; Wang Yu; Wang Fan-sen
- Preceded by: Yuan T. Lee
- Succeeded by: Wang Fan-sen (acting)

Personal details
- Born: August 3, 1948 (age 78) Yizhu, Tainan County, Taiwan (now Chiayi County)
- Education: National Taiwan University (BS, MS); Massachusetts Institute of Technology (PhD)
- Awards: Wolf Prize in Chemistry (2014)

Chi-Huey Wong (Chinese: 翁啟惠; pinyin: Wēng Qǐhuì; born 3 August 1948) is a Taiwanese-American biochemist who is the Scripps Family Chair Professor at the Scripps Research Institute. He is a member of the United States National Academy of Sciences, and was awarded the 2014 Wolf Prize in Chemistry and the 2015 RSC Robert Robinson Award. Wong is also the holder of more than 100 patents and publisher of 700 more scholarly academic research papers under his name.

== Early life and education ==
Wong was born in Yizhu, Chiayi, on August 3, 1948. He graduated from National Taiwan University with a Bachelor of Science (B.S.) in 1970 and a Master of Science (M.S.) in 1977, both in biochemistry. He then completed graduate studies in the United States and earned his Ph.D. in organic chemistry in 1982 from the Massachusetts Institute of Technology (MIT) under the direction of professor George M. Whitesides. At MIT, he studied the use of enzymes as catalysts in organic synthesis.

== Research and career ==
Wong continued his postdoctoral research work with George M. Whitesides at Harvard University from 1982 to 1983, then began his independent career at Texas A&M University in the chemistry department. During his tenure at Texas A&M University, he went through the ranks including assistant professor, associate professor, and professor of chemistry.

Wong was appointed as the Ernest W. Hahn Chair and professor of chemistry at the Scripps Research Institute and while he was a faculty member at Scripps, he also served as head of the Frontier Research Program on Glycotechnology at Riken in Japan and director of the Genomics Research Center at Academia Sinica, and was later appointed by the President of the Republic of China (Taiwan) as the President of Academia Sinica. Now, he is serving at the Scripps Research Institute as Scripps Family Chair Professor of Chemistry.

Wong is best known for his original contributions to glycoscience, especially his development of chemo-enzymatic methods for the practical synthesis of oligosaccharides and glycoproteins and the hierarchical and programmable one-pot synthesis method for the rapid preparation of a large number of oligosaccharides. The original synthetic methods developed by Wong along with his work on the development of glycan microarrays for the high-throughput analysis of protein-carbohydrate interaction and the design of glycosylation probes have enabled not only the fundamental study of glycosylation in biology but also the clinical development of carbohydrate-based medicines, including vaccines and homogeneous antibodies for the treatment of cancers and infectious diseases.

In 2016, there was a media report, speculating that he was possibly involved in an insider trading scandal related to a biotech company OBI Pharma, Inc. headquartered in Taiwan, because his adult daughter had held shares in OBI Pharma. When the allegations surfaced in March 2016, Wong was in the United States. He was quite disappointed by the false report and attempted to resign his position as president of the Academia Sinica twice. Both requests were rejected by the president of Taiwan, Ma Ying-jeou. After further consideration, Ma chose to approve Wong's resignation on 10 May. In February 2018, the Shilin District Prosecutors Office announced that charges of insider trading against Wong had been dropped, though an investigation into a possible failure in disclosing his assets during tech transfer of his invention had not yet concluded by the Control Yuan. In April 2022, the Control Yuan publicly announced that Wong did not violate any rule.

== Recognition ==
=== Awards ===
- 1985 – Searle Scholar Award
- 1986 – Presidential Young Investigator Award in Chemistry
- 1994 – IUPAC International Carbohydrate Award
- 1998 – Harrison Howe Award, American Chemical Society
- 1999 – International Enzyme Engineering Award
- 1999 – Claude S. Hudson Award, American Chemical Society
- 2000 – United States Presidential Green Chemistry Award
- 2005 – American Chemical Society Award for Creative Work in Synthetic Organic Chemistry
- 2008 – F.A. Cotton Medal for Excellence in Chemical Research
- 2012 – Arthur C. Cope Award by the American Chemical Society.
- 2014 – Wolf Prize in Chemistry
- 2015 – Robert Robinson Award, Royal Society of Chemistry
- 2016 and 2022 – Asian Scientist 100, Asian Scientist
- 2021 – Welch Award in Chemistry
- 2022 – Chemical Pioneer Award of the American Institute of Chemists
- 2023 – Israel Chemical Society International Barry Cohen Award
- 2023 – Federation of Asian Chemical Societies (FACS) Foundation Lectureship Award
- 2027 - Alfred Bader Award, American Chemical Society

=== Honorary doctorates ===
- 2007 – Technion – Israel Institute of Technology, Israel
- 2007 – National Yang-Ming University, Taiwan (now NYCU)
- 2008 – National Sun Yat-sen University, Taiwan
- 2009 – City University of Hong Kong, Hong Kong SAR
- 2010 – National Chung Hsing University, Taiwan
- 2011 – National Chiao Tung University, Taiwan (now NYCU)
- 2011 – National Tsing-Hua University, Taiwan

== Memberships ==
Wong was elected as a member of the Academia Sinica in 1994, the American Academy of Arts and Science in 1996, the United States National Academy of Sciences in 2002, the World Academy of Sciences in 2007, the United States National Academy of Inventors in 2014, and also an Associate Member of the European Molecular Biology Organization in 2010.

== Bibliography ==
- Enzymes in Synthetic Organic Chemistry. Pergamon Press. 1994. ISBN 978-0-08-050582-4
- Carbohydrate Based Drug Discovery. Wiley Online Library. 2003. ISBN 978-3-527-60243-8
- Current Status and New Challenges in Glycoscience. Springer. ISBN 978-4-431-54841-6

== Patents ==
Wong obtained many patents for his inventions. His representative patents include Globo-H and related anti-cancer vaccines with novel glycolipid adjuvants (US9,603,913B2), Glycan arrays on PTFE-like aluminum coated glass slides and related methods (US8,680,020), Methods and compositions for immunization against virus (US8.741,311), Large scale enzymatic synthesis of oligosaccharides (US9,340,812), Methods for modifying human antibodies by glycan engineering (US10, 087,236), Compositions and methods relating to universal glycoforms for enhanced antibody efficacy (US10,023892), Crystal structure of bifunctional transglycosylase PBP1b from E. Coli and inhibitors thereof (US9890111B2), Quantitative analysis of carbohydrate-protein interactions using glycan microarrays: determination of surface and solution dissociation constants (US-8906832-B2), Antibiotic compositions and related screening methods (US8916540B2), Hirsutella Sinensis mycelia compositions and methods for treating sepsis and related inflammatory responses (US8486914B2), and Tailored glycoproteomic methods for the sequencing, mapping and identification of cellular glycoproteins (US7943330B2).
