= Zhuang Changgong =

Chinese chemist

Zhuang Zhanggong (Chinese: 庄长恭; December 25, 1894 – February 25, 1962) was a Chinese chemist. He was a founding member of the Chinese Academy of Sciences.
