= Fu-Tong Liu =

Taiwanese dermatologist

Liu Fu-tong 劉扶東
- Education: National Taiwan University (BS); University of Chicago (PhD); University of Miami (MD)
- Occupation: Dermatologist
- Scientific career
- Fields: Photochemistry; Dermatology
- Workplaces: University of California, Davis; National Taiwan University; University of Southern California
- Thesis: Photochemistry of nucleic acid derivatives (1976)
- Doctoral advisor: Nien-chu Yang

Fu-Tong Liu (Chinese: 劉扶東; pinyin: Liú Fúdōng) is a Taiwanese photochemist, dermatologist, and physician. He served as the vice-president of Academia Sinica from 2016 to 2022. He is a professor of dermatology at the University of Southern California School of Medicine.

== Early life and education ==
Liu graduated from Taipei Municipal Chien Kuo High School in 1966. After high school, he graduated from National Taiwan University with a Bachelor of Science (B.S.) in chemistry in 1970, then completed a dual doctoral MD–PhD program in the United States. He earned his Ph.D. in chemistry from the University of Chicago in 1976 under Professor Nien-chu Yang. His doctoral dissertation at Chicago was titled, "Photochemistry of nucleic acid derivatives".

After receiving his doctorate from the University of Chicago, Liu became a postdoctoral researcher at the University of Illinois at Urbana–Champaign and eventually completed his postdoctoral work at Scripps Research. In 1987, he earned a Doctor of Medicine (M.D.) from the University of Miami School of Medicine while at Scripps. He completed his medical residency at the University of California, San Diego.

== Career ==
Liu left Scripps to become a professor at the University of California, Davis, in 2001. At UCD, Liu was chair professor and later appointed distinguished professor in 2012. He returned to Taiwan in 2011, for a full professorship at National Taiwan University and a concurrent adjunct professorship at National Yang-Ming University. He has been a professor at the University of Southern California School of Medicine since 2023.

Liu has also served as chair professor at China Medical University and Tzu Chi University. In 2012, Liu was elected a member of Academia Sinica. The next year, he was elected a Fellow of the American Association for the Advancement of Science.
