= Academia Sinica =

National academy of Taiwan

- 中央研究院 (Chinese)

Agency overview
- Formed: April 1928 (in Nanjing); 1949 (in Taipei)
- Headquarters: Nangang, Taipei,Republic of China; 25°2′45″N 121°36′37″E
- Employees: ~5,800 (incl. 976 principal investigators, 111 research specialists, 775 post-docs, 2,150 students)
- Annual budget: 12.5 billion NTD (2020) (US$400 million)
- Agency executive: Chen Chien-jen, President; Tang K. Tang, Vice President (life sciences); Shin-Kun Peng, Vice President (social sciences)
- Parent agency: Office of the President
- Website: www.sinica.edu.tw

Academia Sinica
- Chinese: 中央研究院
- Literal meaning: "Central Research Academy"
Transcriptions
Standard Mandarin
- Hanyu Pinyin: Zhōngyāng Yánjiùyuàn
- Wade–Giles: Chung^{1}-yang^{2} yen^{2}-chiu^{1}-yüan^{4}
Hakka
- Pha̍k-fa-sṳ: Tûng-ông-ngiên-kiu-yen
Southern Min
- Hokkien POJ: Tiong-iong-gián-kiù-īⁿ
- Tâi-lô: Tiong-iong-gián-kiù-īnn

Academia Sinica (AS; Latin: Academia Sinica, lit. 'Chinese Academy'; Chinese: 中央研究院; pinyin: Zhōngyāng Yánjiùyuàn) is the national academy of Taiwan. Headquartered in Nangang, Taipei, it conducts research in mathematics, physical sciences, life sciences, humanities, and social sciences.

The academy was founded in Nanjing, China, in 1928, and was re-established in Taiwan in 1949 following the Chinese Civil War. As an educational institute, it provides PhD training and scholarship through its English-language Taiwan International Graduate Program in biology, agriculture, chemistry, physics, informatics, and earth and environmental sciences.

Membership in Academia Sinica is determined through the election of academicians. An academician of Academia Sinica is the highest academic honor in the country. The current president of the academy since 2026 is Chen Chien-jen.

== History ==
=== Founding and early years ===
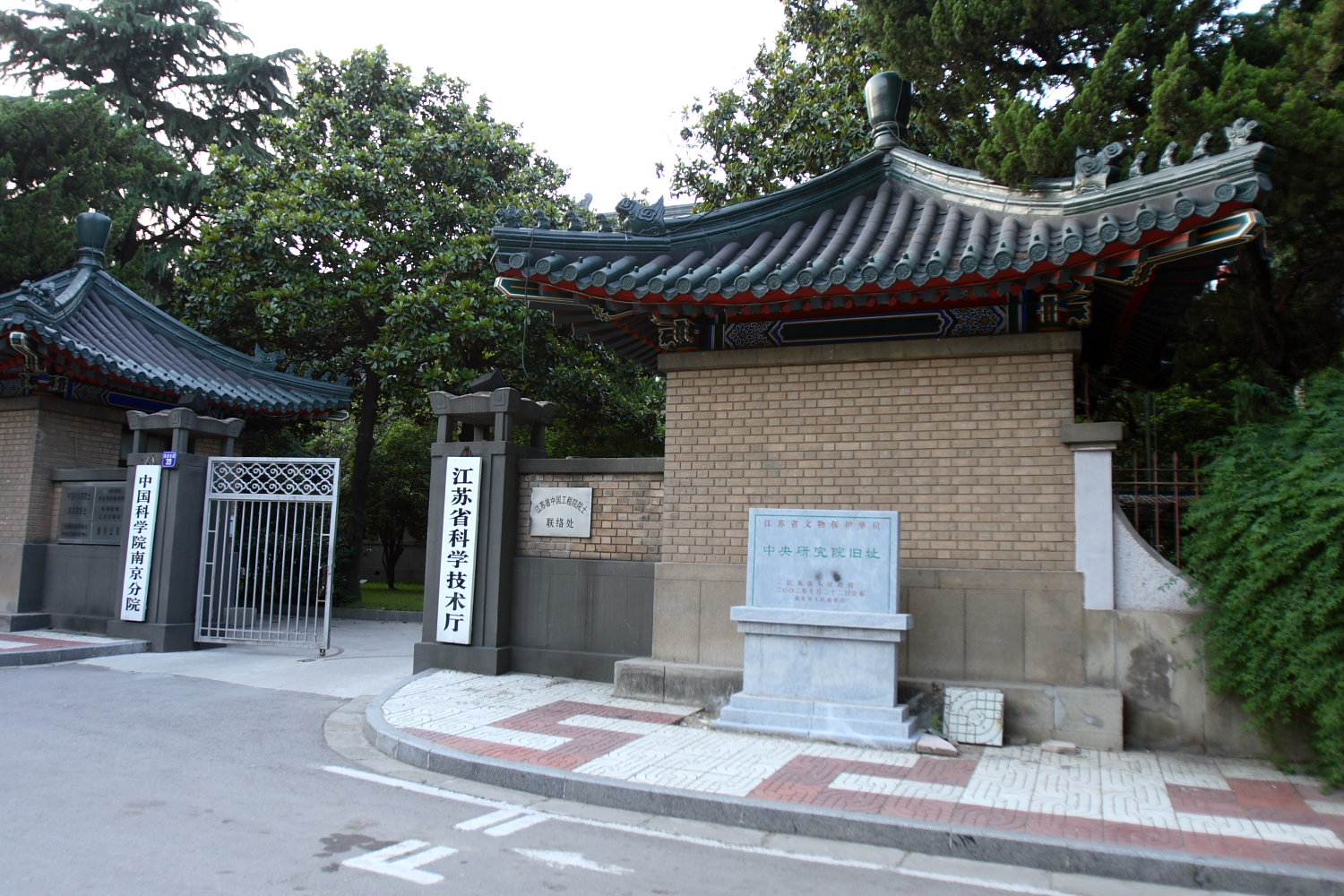
Former Academia Sinica site in Nanjing, currently the Nanjing Branch of Chinese Academy of Sciences

Academia Sinica was established in April 1928 in the capital city of Nanking by the National Government of the Republic of China as the country's highest research organization. Its name is a Latin title whose literal meaning is "Chinese Academy". The academy's first president was the philosopher Cai Yuanpei and its first director-general was the scholar Yang Xingfo. According to historian James Reardon-Anderson, it was "by far the best-funded, most prominent research organ in Republican China". Prior to World War II, Academia Sinica received one-third of all government research expenditures and was also funded by the British and American Boxer Indemnities. The academy's early expenditures encompassed buying the lands, buildings, and equipment necessary to support a staff dedicated to the study of applied sciences.

Under Cai's direction, Academia Sinica adopted European and American institutional models, including the practice of electing academicians. Cai envisioned the academy's mission as modernizing Chinese academia by "saving the nation through scholarship" and "saving the nation through science". He advocated for the academic freedom of educational administration, so that the academy's scholarship could develop autonomously without interference from politics. Under Cai and Yang, the academy operated independently of the Kuomintang (KMT) government and attained membership in the International Council of Scientific Unions. By 1931, ten research institutes—ranging from physics to philology to zoology—were in operation.

In 1935, president Ding Wenjiang established a system of academic assessors in 1935.

=== War years ===
During the Second Sino-Japanese War, Cai died in 1940 and was succeeded as president by geologist Chu Chia-hua, who organized the relocation of the academy's artifacts from Kunming when fighting intensified there.

After the Surrender of Japan, the academy's headquarters returned to Nanking. In October 1946, president Chu Chia-hua organized the election of the academy's first group of academicians. They included mathematicians Su Buqing, Shiing-Shen Chern, and Hua Luogeng; chemists Hsien Wu, Zhuang Changgong, K. K. Chen, and Hou Debang; geologists Li Siguang, Weng Wenhao, Yang Zhongjian, and Zhang Hongzhao; meteorologist Chu Coching; engineer Mao Yisheng; and historian-linguists Fu Ssu-nien and Chen Yinke; among others. Of the 81 academicians elected, 49 were educated in the U.S., 23 in Europe, and five in Japan; six—including archaeologist Dong Zuobin and historians Gu Jiegang and Liu Yizheng—were educated domestically.

On December 19, 1948, all of the academy's institutes unanimously voted to move to Taiwan via Guangxi and Guangdong, due to the outbreak of the Chinese Civil War. However, only Academia Sinica's Institute of Mathematics and the Institute of History and Philology were able to relocate to Taiwan; the remainder of the academy's property and affiliates in mainland China were absorbed into the Chinese Academy of Sciences. Of the original group of 81 academicians, only nine moved to Taiwan.

The academy was low on monetary funds, and reopened with the Institute of History and Philology in December 1954. In the same year, its main campus was constructed in Jiuzhuang, Nangang, Taipei. Due to the importance of agriculture to the economy of Taiwan, efforts were made to revive the Institute of Botany. The second convocation of the Academia Sinica was held in 1957. At the same time, the mainland part of Academia Sinica remained functioning under Communist rule as the Chinese Academy of Sciences.

=== Contemporary ===
In the 2000s, many of the current institutes and research centers were established, partially through reorganization of old ones. Academia Sinica's first PhD program, the Taiwan International Graduate Program, was inaugurated in 2006.

== Leadership ==
The president of Academia Sinica is appointed by the president of the Republic of China (Taiwan) from three candidates recommended by the Council Meeting. The president of Academia Sinica must be an academician. After the appointment, the president serves a five-year term and can serve up to two consecutive terms.

Academia Sinica's current president is James C. Liao, a biochemist, who replaced Chi-Huey Wong, a biological chemist and the Parsons Foundation Professor and Chair of the Department of Chemical and Biomolecular Engineering at the University of California, Los Angeles, as the 11th president on 21 June 2016. The list of past presidents also includes Hu Shih, a philosopher and essayist, and a key contributor to Chinese liberalism and language reform in his advocacy for the use of vernacular Chinese, as well as an influential redology scholar and holder of the Jiaxu manuscript (Chinese: 甲戌本; pinyin: Jiǎxū běn) until his death. The fifth president, Yuan T. Lee, won the Nobel Prize in Chemistry for "contributions to the dynamics of chemical elementary processes".

=== Presidents ===
- Cai Yuanpei (1928–1940)
- Chu Chia-Hua (Acting, 1940–1957)
- Hu Shih (1958–1962)
- Wang Shih-Chieh (1962–1970)
- Chien Shih-Liang (1970–1983)
- Wu Ta-You (1983–1994)
- Yuan T. Lee (1994–2006)
- Chi-Huey Wong (2006–2016)
- James C. Liao (2016–2026)
- Chen Chien-jen (2026–present)

== Convocation ==
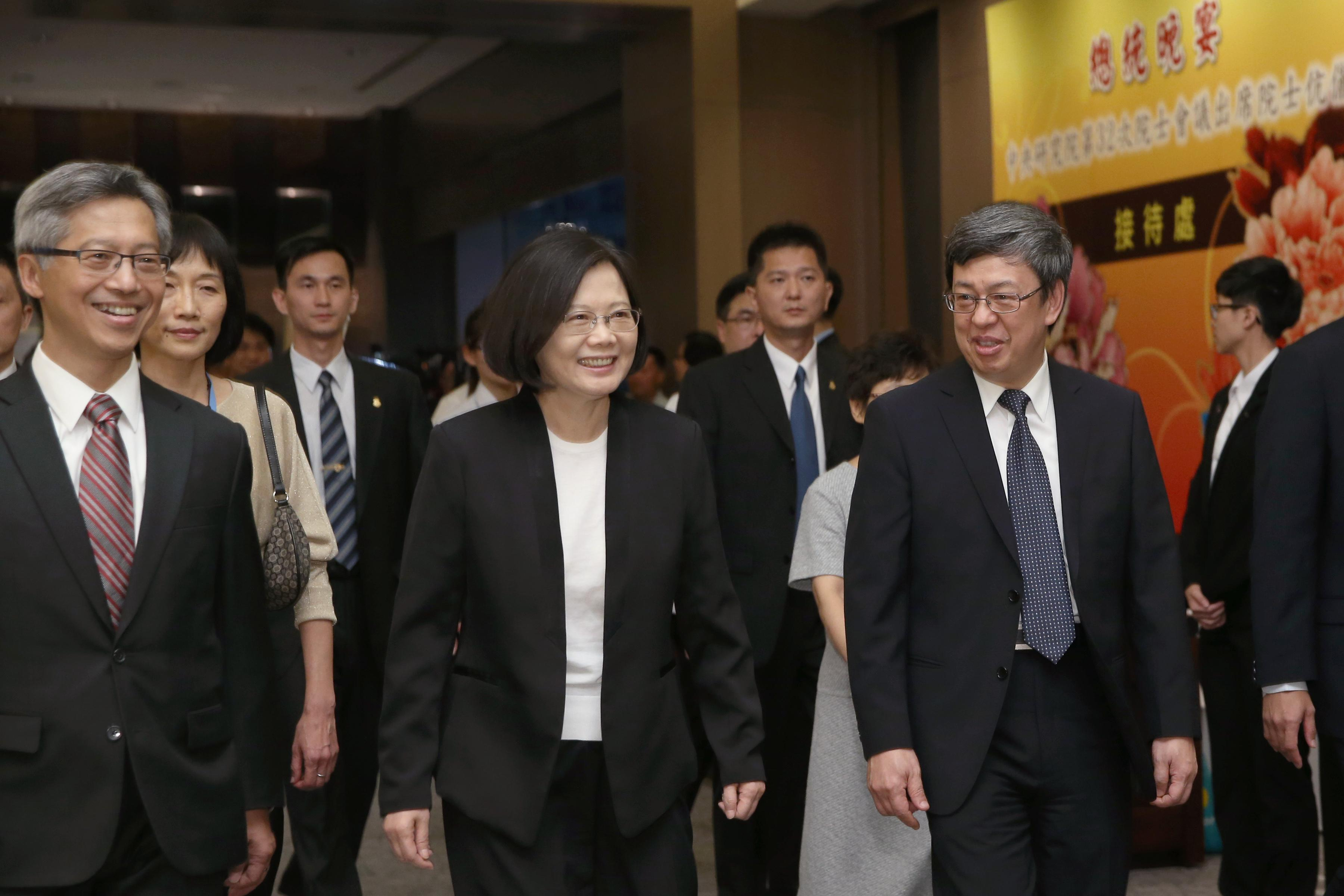
(Left to right) President James C. Liao, president of Taiwan Tsai Ing-wen, and vice president of Taiwan Chen Chien-jen at the 32nd Convocation Meeting

The Convocation of Academia Sinica consists of 281 academicians, including 105 domestic and 176 overseas appointed scientists. Seven academicians of Academia Sinica are Nobel laureates. Academician membership is an honorary lifetime privilege without remuneration. They do not necessarily perform research or reside at the Academia Sinica campus. According to their own expertise, academicians are grouped into three divisions: Mathematics and Physical Sciences, Life Sciences, and Social Sciences and Humanities. A maximum number of ten new members is allocated to each of the three divisions during the biennial convocation. The eligibility of the academicians is not restricted to the residents of Republic of China (Taiwan) citizens. More than half of the academicians are overseas scholars and scientists.

At the convocation, the academicians elect new academicians and honorary academicians, and elect members to the Council of Academia Sinica. The convocation can also recommend policies to the government on academic research. The academicians also have responsibilities to carry out research at the government's request, although the government has never requested any task.

== Academicians ==
Academicians are elected every two years, with nominations open in July and ending in October. Outcome of election to academicians are publicly announced in July the following year. Election to the academy is regarded a national honor in Taiwan. Up until the 34th convocation of academicians in 2022, any scientist of Chinese descent could be elected a member of Academia Sinica. Starting in 2023, election is to be restricted to citizens of the Republic of China. This change led Academia Sinica to discuss formally classifying non-Taiwanese members as honorary or foreign members. Such a classification system would require amendments to the Organic Act of the Academia Sinica. A group of academicians proposed that membership be further restricted to Taiwan passport or national identification card holders.

=== Resident academicians ===
Mathematics and physical sciences

- Yuan T. Lee
- Chi-Huey Wong
- Typhoon Lee
- Maw-Kuen Wu

Life sciences

- James C. Liao
- Wen-Hsiung Li
- Chen Chien-jen
- Liao I-chiu
- Chen Pei-jer
- Ming-Che Shih

Humanities and social sciences

- Paul Jen-kuei Li
- Cyrus Chu

=== Nobel Prize laureates ===
- Yuan T. Lee (chemistry 1986)
- Steven Chu (physics 1997)
- Daniel C. Tsui (physics 1998)

=== Academicians who reside overseas ===
- Shih-Fu Chang
- Jianqing Fan
- Teck-Hua Ho
- Dorothy Y Ko
- Bede Liu
- Philip LF Liu
- Teresa Meng
- Shuji Nakamura
- Kang-i Sun Chang
- Yu Xie
- Victor Zue

== Campuses ==
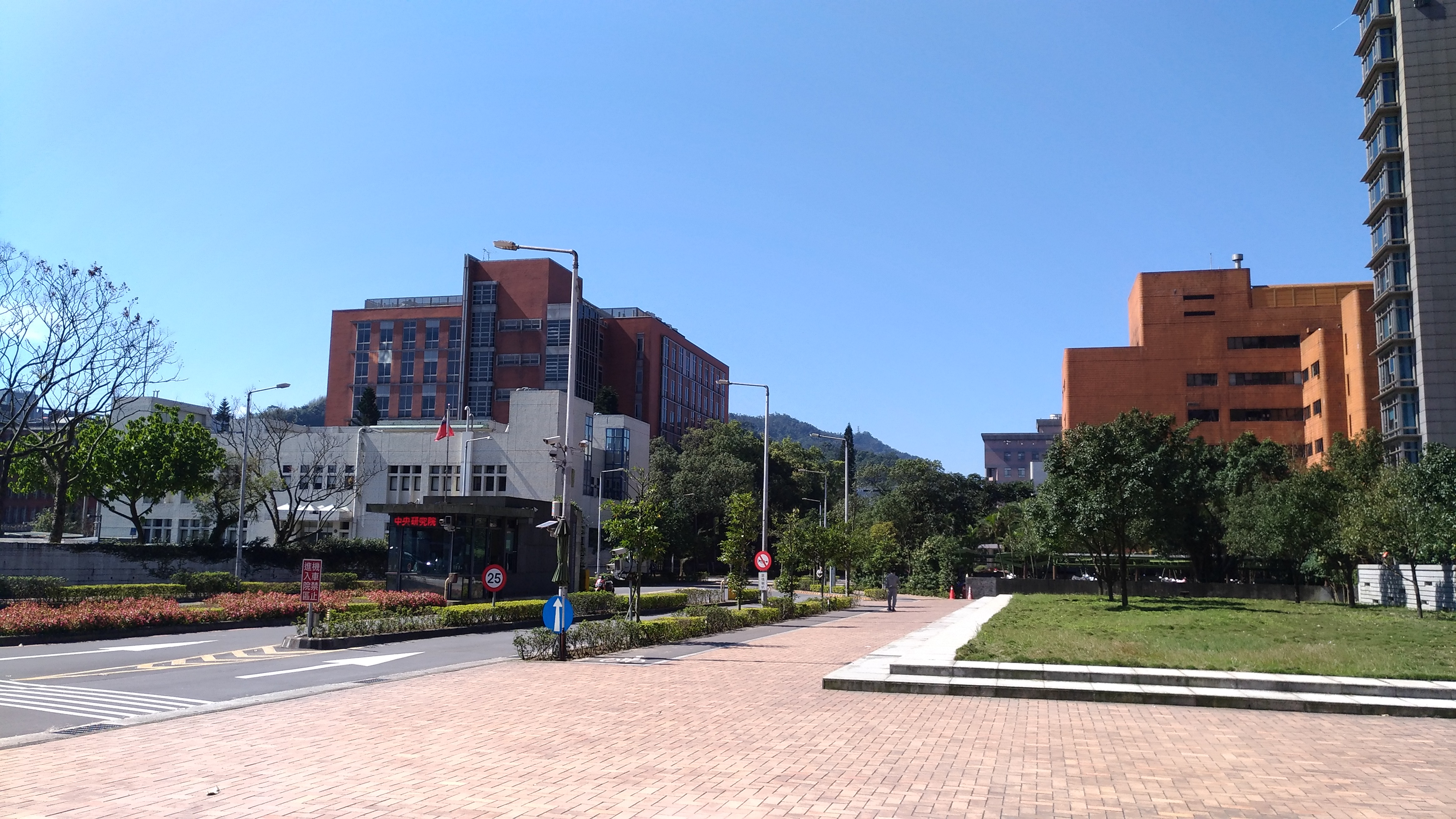
Main entrance

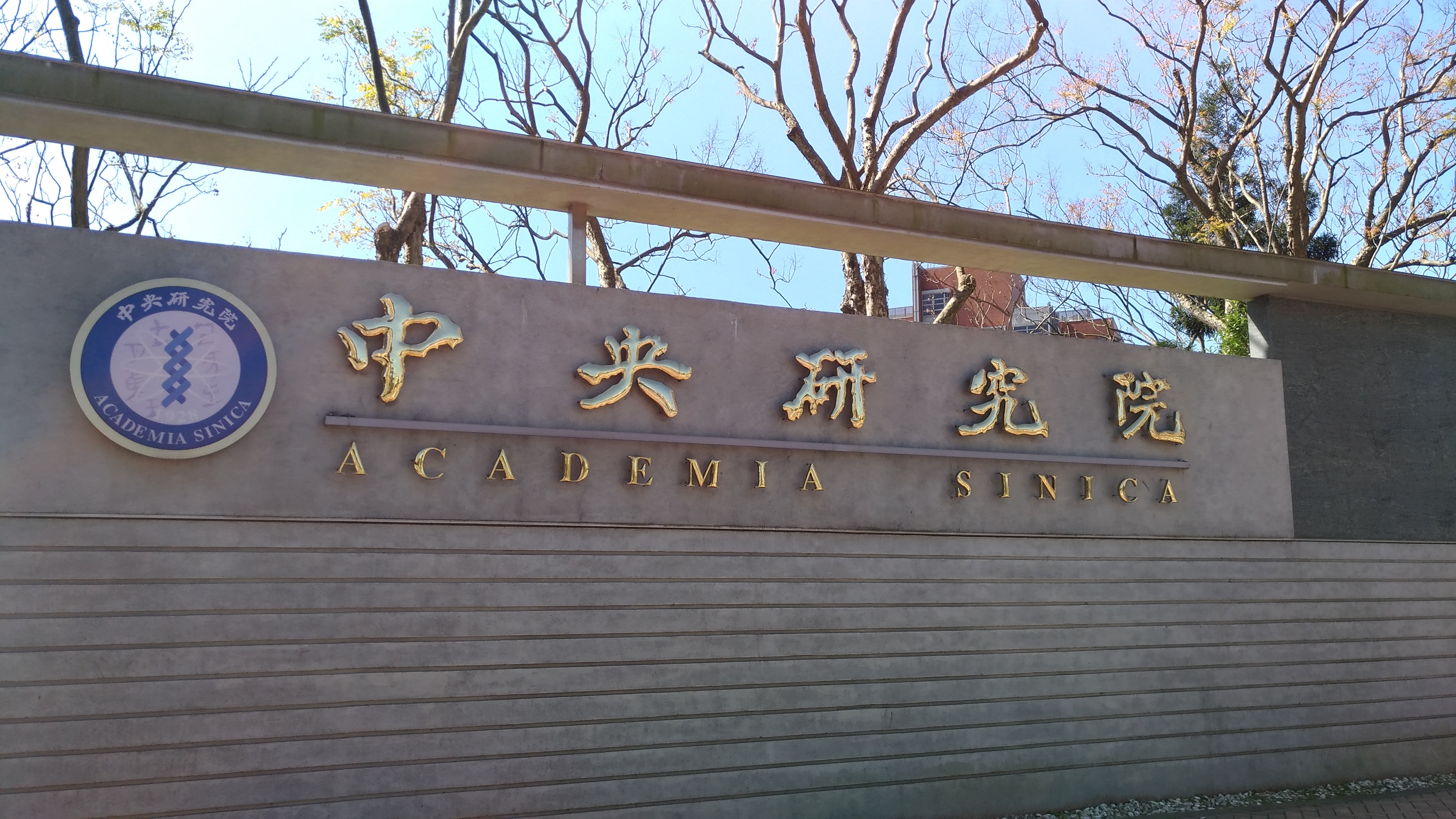
Emblem at the main entrance

Academia Sinica has its main campus located in Nangang, Taipei, and runs over 40 research stations distributed across the country and throughout the world.

=== Main campus ===
The main campus in Jiuzhuang, Nangang was constructed in 1954. In addition to the Central Office of Administration and 28 institutes and research centers, the main campus has 10 museums or memorial halls open to the public, as well as an ecological pond, a forest park, a Tudigong temple (Fude Temple 福德宮), and Sifen Creek (四分溪), which runs through the campus and to the north by the National Biotechnology Research Park.

=== National Biotechnology Research Park ===
The National Biotechnology Research Park, finished in 2017 and inaugurated in October 2018 by Taiwanese President Tsai Ing-wen, is located about 500 m north of the main campus and 500 m south of the Nankang Software Park, with the Nangang station to the west and the Taipei Nangang Exhibition Center MRT station to the east. It is home to four Academia Sinica centers for translational medicine, innovation, incubation, and bioinformatics service, as well as the Biotechnology Development Center of the Ministry of Economic Affairs, the Food and Drug Administration of the Ministry of Health and Welfare, and the National Laboratory Animal Center of the Ministry of Science and Technology.

=== National Taiwan University main campus ===
Three physical sciences institutes, Mathematics, Astronomy, and Atomic and Molecular Sciences, are located in the main campus of National Taiwan University in Gongguan, Daan, Taipei. A joint office between the two institutions was established in 2014.

=== Southern Campus ===
A campus in the Shalun Smart Green Energy Science City, near the Tainan High Speed Rail station, Guiren District, Tainan, opened in 2024. The Southern Campus is part of an effort to promote regional balance in the academic landscape of Taiwan and will prioritize research on agricultural biotechnology, sustainable development, and archaeology of early Taiwanese history and culture.

== Organization ==
=== Institutes and research centers ===
Academia Sinica covers three major academic divisions:

==== Mathematics and physical sciences ====
11 centers; 339 research fellows

- Mathematics
- Physics (1962)
- Chemistry (1957)
- Earth Sciences (1982)
- Institute of Information Science (1982)
- Statistical Science (1987)
- Atomic and Molecular Sciences (1995)
- Astronomy and Astrophysics (2010)
- Applied Sciences (2006)
- Environmental Changes (2004)
- Information Technology Innovation (2007)

==== Life sciences ====
8 centers; 329 research fellows

- Plant and Microbial Biology (2005)
- Cellular and Organismic Biology (2005)
- Biological Chemistry (1970)
- Molecular Biology (1993)
- Genomics (2003)
- Agricultural Biotechnology (2006)
- Biodiversity (2004)
- Biomedical Sciences (1981)

==== Humanities and social sciences ====
12 centers; 319 research fellows

- History and Philology
- Ethnology (1965)
- Modern History (1965)
- Economics (1970)
- European and American Studies (1991)
- Chinese Literature and Philosophy (2002)
- Taiwan History (2004)
- Sociology (2004)
- Linguistics (2004)
- Political Science (2012)
- Iurisprudentiae (2011)
- Humanities and Social Sciences (2004)

=== Research stations ===
The research stations in Taiwan include:

- Southern Taiwan Science Park Archaeological Station (南科考古工作站)
- Green Island Marine Station (綠島海洋研究站)
- Yuanyang Lake Station (鴛鴦湖工作站), Jianshi, Hsinchu
- Marine Research Station, Jiaosi, Yilan (宜蘭礁溪臨海研究站)
- Dongsha Atoll Research Station, Kaohsiung (東沙環礁研究站)

The research sites abroad include:

- Global Navigation Satellite System (GNSS), Luzon, the Philippines
- Sesoko Station, Okinawa, Japan
- Yuan Tseh Lee Array (YTLA), Mauna Loa, Hawaii, United States
- South-East Asian Time Series Study (SEATS) on the South China Sea

== Education programs ==
=== PhD programs ===
==== Joint programs ====
In general Academia Sinica is a non-teaching institution, but it has very close collaboration with the top research universities in Taiwan, such as National Taiwan University, National Tsing Hua University, National Yang Ming Chiao Tung University and National Central University. Many research fellows from Academia Sinica have a second appointment or joint professorship at these universities. In addition, Academia Sinica established joint PhD programs in biological sciences with Taiwan's universities, such as the Doctoral Degree Program in Marine Biotechnology with National Taiwan Ocean University. Through these mechanisms, the faculty at Academia Sinica give lecture courses and supervise graduate students.

==== Taiwan International Graduate Program ====
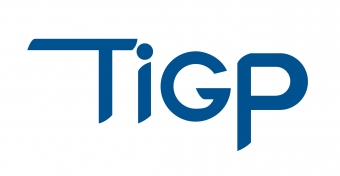
Logo of Taiwan International Graduate Program

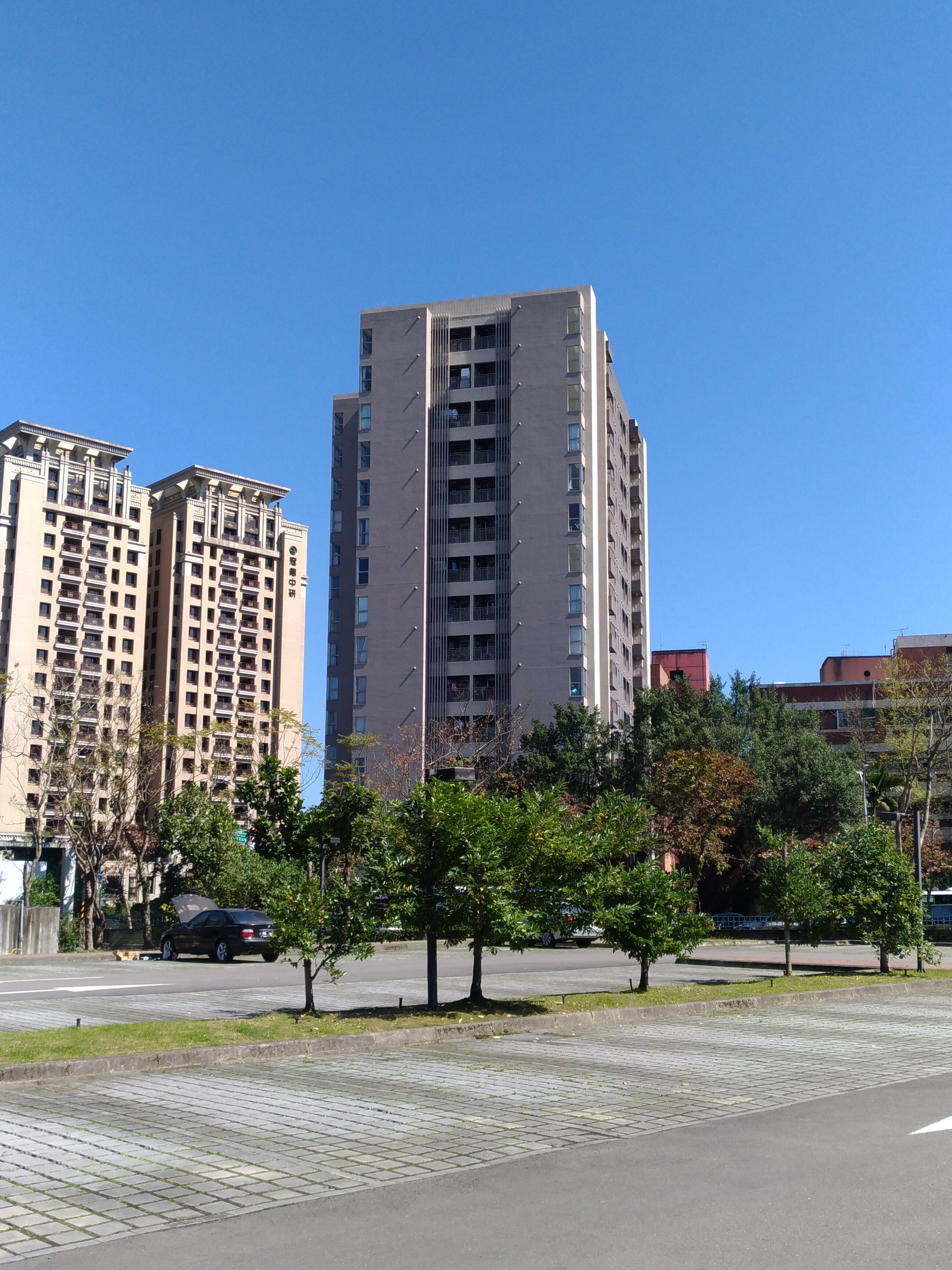
One of the dormitories for TIGP students and their families

Since 2002, Academia Sinica set up the Taiwan International Graduate Program (TIGP), open to local and international students for PhD programs. All courses at TIGP are conducted in English. Students can choose their advisor among a faculty selected for the program out of outstanding researchers and professors appointed at Academia Sinica or at one of the partner universities (or both). Currently, admittance to the programme guarantees a monthly stipend of 40,000 NTD, roughly $1,200 or €1,150 in their first year and up to 50,000 NTD, roughly $1,500 or €1,400 in their third year.

The TIGP offers PhD programs only in selected disciplines agreed upon by Academia Sinica and its national research universities partners. The program offers doctoral degrees in highly interdisciplinary areas in the physical sciences, applied sciences, engineering, biological and agricultural sciences, health and medical sciences, humanities and social sciences. As of March 2017, Academia Sinica administers 13 such programs with degrees issued from partner universities:

- Chemical Biology and Molecular Biophysics
- Molecular Science and Technology
- Molecular and Biological Agricultural Sciences
- Bioinformatics
- Molecular and Cell Biology
- Nano Science and Technology
- Molecular Medicine
- Earth System Science
- Biodiversity
- Interdisciplinary Neuroscience
- Sustainable Chemical Science and Technology
- Social Network and Human-Centered Computing
- Artificial Intelligence of Things

=== Predoctoral programs ===
==== TIGP International Internship Program ====
Launched in 2009, the TIGP International Internship Program (TIGP-IIP) is an intensive, predoctoral, summer research training program for two months that prepares its participating interns with the necessary knowledge and skills for future research or career development through rigorous hands-on training.

== Postdoctoral scholars ==
Academia Sinica has a high number of both domestic and international postdoctoral fellows. They are funded by grants of the Ministry of Science and Technology or by Academia Sinica. The latter, the Academia Sinica Postdoctoral Fellow Program, consists of two tracks: Regular Postdoctoral Scholars (starting annual salary: NT$810,351 (US$28,100), additional benefits depending on the principal investigator) and Academia Sinica Postdoctoral Scholars (annual salary up to NT$1,167,278 (US$40,000), plus round-trip ticket and research subsidy of (US$4,500).

== International cooperation ==
The institute has extensive cooperation with research and academic institutions from other countries (such as Harvard-Yenching Institute) and hosts several foreign institutes and their scholars.

=== France ===
The Taipei Center of the French School of Asian Studies (EFEO) was hosted by the Institute of Modern History, AS, from 1992 to 1996 and since 1996 by the Institute of History and Philology. Its research projects center on the local and cultural history of Taiwan and China, and it organizes conferences and talks, support visiting scholars and students, and hosts EFEO fellows.

== Journals associated with Academia Sinica ==
Academia Sinica currently sponsors the following journals:

- Botanical Studies
- Zoological Studies
- Language and Linguistics
- Statistica Sinica
- Academia Sinica Law Journal
- Taiwan Journal of Anthropology
- Academia Economic Papers
- Bulletin of the Institute of Modern History, Academia Sinica
- Journal of Social Sciences and Philosophy

== See also ==
- List of universities in Taiwan
- Max Planck Institutes
- Tang K. Tang
- Academician of Academia Sinica
