= Bioproducts engineering =

Bioproducts engineering or bioprocess engineering refers to engineering of bio-products from renewable bioresources. This pertains to the design and development of processes and technologies for the sustainable manufacture of bioproducts (materials, chemicals and energy) from renewable biological resources.

== Role of bioproducts engineers ==
Bioproducts engineers harness the molecular building blocks of renewable resources to design, develop and manufacture environmentally friendly industrial and consumer products. From biofuels, renewable energy, and bioplastics to paper products and "green" building materials such as bio-based composites, Bioproducts engineers are developing sustainable solutions to meet the world's growing materials and energy demand. Conventional bioproducts and emerging bioproducts are two broad categories used to categorize bioproducts. Examples of conventional bio-based products include building materials, pulp and paper, and forest products. Examples of emerging bioproducts or biobased products include biofuels, bioenergy, starch-based and cellulose-based ethanol, bio-based adhesives, biochemicals, biodegradable plastics, etc.

Bioproducts engineers play a role in the design and development of "green" products including biofuels, bioenergy, biodegradable plastics, biocomposites, building materials, paper and chemicals. Bioproducts engineers also develop manufacturing processes for these products as well as end-use applications.

== Relation to other fields ==
Commonly referred to as bioprocess engineering, bioprocess engineering is a specialization of biotechnology, biological engineering, chemical engineering or of agricultural engineering. It deals with the design and development of equipment and processes for the manufacturing of products such as food, feed, pharmaceuticals, nutraceuticals, chemicals, and polymers and paper from biological materials. Bioprocess engineering is a conglomerate of mathematics, biology and industrial design, and consists of various spectrums like designing of fermentors, study of fermentors (mode of operations etc.). It also deals with studying various biotechnological processes used in industries for large scale production of biological product for optimization of yield in the end product and the quality of end product. Bio process engineering may include the work of mechanical, electrical and industrial engineers to apply principles of their disciplines to processes based on using living cells or sub component of such cells.

== See also ==
- Biochemicals
- Biofact (biology)
- Biogas
- Biomass
- Biomass (ecology)
- Biorefining
- Bioresource engineering
- Forest
- Non-timber forest product
- Outline of forestry

== Colleges and universities ==
- University of Minnesota (Bioproducts and Biosystems Engineering)
- SUNY-ESF (Bioprocess Engineering Program)
- Université de Sherbrooke
- UC Berkeley
- Savannah Technical College
- East Carolina University
- Institute of Chemical Technology (ICT) Mumbai
- Jadavpur University
- Universidade Federal do Rio de Janeiro
- Universidade Estadual do Rio Grande do Sul
- University of Stellenbosch
- NC State University
- Virginia Tech
- Washington State University
- University of Washington
- University of Maine
