= Rutgers School of Engineering =

School of Rutgers University

Coordinates: 40.520650°N 74.456105°W

School of Engineering The State University of New Jersey
- Motto: Sol iustitiae et occidentem illustra
- Motto in English: Sun of righteousness, shine upon the West also
- Type: Public
- Established: 1914
- Dean: Alberto Cuitino
- Undergraduates: 2,420
- Location: Piscataway, New Jersey, US
- Campus: Urban
- Website: http://www.soe.rutgers.edu

The School of Engineering at Rutgers University was founded in 1914 as the College of Engineering. It was originally a part of the Rutgers Scientific School, which was founded in 1864. The school has seven academic departments, with a combined undergraduate student enrollment of over 2,400 students. It offers over 25 academic and professional degree programs. These include several interdisciplinary programs, such as Environmental Engineering (formerly called bioenvironmental engineering or bioresource engineering) with the Department of Environmental Science, and the graduate program in mechanics.

== Departments and programs ==
The Rutgers School of Engineering is composed primarily of seven academic departments. All of the degree programs offered are certified by the Accreditation Board for Engineering and Technology.

In addition, the School also has undergraduate programs in applied sciences and in Environmental Engineering (formerly known as Bioenvironmental Engineering), and also a graduate program in mechanics. The joint SoE/SEBS environmental engineering program is separate from the SoE-only civil and environmental engineering program. Students who chose to pursue a degree in applied sciences also have to option to select a concentration in Packaging Engineering, Engineering Physics, Biomedical Science, or Premed.

== Degrees offered ==
The school offers the Bachelor of Science (B.S.), Master of Science (M.S.), and Doctor of Philosophy (Ph.D.) degrees. Graduate students are technically enrolled in the Graduate School-New Brunswick, and not directly in the School of Engineering. For this reason, all graduate degrees are awarded to a student by the Graduate School-New Brunswick on successful completion of one or more of the degree programs listed below.

The SoE also offers a five-year B.S./M.B.A. program in conjunction with the Rutgers Business School. Students who opt for this program are, however, required to meet certain GPA and GMAT score requirements, and are required to apply to the program in the Spring semester of their Junior year.

A combined M.S. and diploma course is also offered by the School of Engineering and the von Karman Institute for Fluid Dynamics in Belgium.

The SoE is also home to the Rutgers-UMDNJ PhD Training Program in Biotechnology, which has received support from the National Institutes of Health for over 20 years.

== Research centers ==
The Rutgers School of Engineering is home to several research centers, and is also affiliated with other research centers throughout Rutgers University. These large-scale research centers are typically funded through various New Jersey and federal grants, and also through corporate sponsorships. Also, numerous smaller research laboratories exist within the various academic departments of the SoE.

An (incomplete) list of the research centers is provided below:

- Center for Innovative Ventures of Emerging Technologies
- Center for Advanced Infrastructure and Transportation (CAIT)
- Center for Advanced Energy Systems (CAES)
- Center for Advanced Materials via Immiscible Polymer Processing (AMIPP)
- Center for Digital Signal Processing Research
- Ceramic and Composite Materials Center (CCMC)
- Center for Nanomaterials Research
- Computationally Advanced Infrastructure Partnerships (CAIP) - previously known as the Center for Advanced Information Processing (CAIP)
- Fiber Optic Materials Research Program (FOMRP)
- Institute for Advanced Materials, Devices, and Nanotechnology (IAMDN)
- Laboratory for Nanostructured Materials Research
- Microelectronics Research Laboratory (MERL)
- Wireless Information Networks Laboratory (WINLAB)

== Student organizations ==
The School of Engineering has a student governing organization, the Engineering Governing Council (EGC). The EGC functions as a liaison between students and members of the faculty, distributes funds to the various engineering academic societies active within the SoE, and generally represents the students of the SoE in the Rutgers University Community.

Several national and international student and professional engineering organizations also have branches or chapters at the Rutgers School of Engineering, and listed below

- Alpha Eta Mu Beta - A biomedical engineering honor society
- American Institute of Aeronautics and Astronautics (AIAA)
- American Institute of Chemical Engineers
- American Society of Mechanical Engineers (ASME)
- American Society of Civil Engineers
- Biomedical Engineering Society
- Engineers Without Borders
- Eta Kappa Nu - A national electrical and computer engineering honor society
- Institute of Electrical and Electronics Engineers
- Institute of Industrial Engineers
- International Society for Pharmaceutical Engineering
- Material Advantage
- Minority Engineering Educational Task
- Phi Sigma Rho - A social sorority
- Research and Development at Rutgers (RADAR)
- Rutgers Engineering Pi Club
- Rutgers Formula Racing (Formula SAE)
- Society of Hispanic Engineers
- Sigma Phi Delta - An international social-professional engineering fraternity
- Society of Women Engineers
- Tau Beta Pi - A national engineering honor society

== Notable alumni ==
- Ann Marie Carlton, chemist and environmental engineer
- Dev Ittycheria, CEO of MongoDB Inc., Co-founder of BladeLogic
- Peter C. Schultz, co-inventor of the fiber optics used for telecommunications
- Mir Imran, created the world's first implantable cardiac defibrillator
- Michelle Dickinson, nanotechnologist and science educator
- Sachidananda Kangovi, American technology executive, aerospace engineer, author
- Tony Tamer, American billionaire businessman, and the co-founder and executive chairman of H.I.G. Capital
- Liang Xiao, Chinese communications engineer, and a professor in the Department of Communication Engineering at Xiamen University
- Harry A. Marmer, Russian-born American engineer, mathematician and oceanographer
- Charles Molnar, co-developer of one of the first minicomputers
- John Ballato, American materials scientist, entrepreneur, and academic
- Myles Johnson, American former basketball player
- Ave Kludze, American aerospace engineer and civil servant
- Richard H. Frenkiel, American engineer, known for his significant role in the early development of cellular telephone networks
- David R. Kaeli, American computer scientist
- Randal Pinkett, American business consultant
- Terry Hart, American mechanical and electrical engineer, a retired United States Air Force lieutenant colonel and pilot, and former NASA astronaut
- Rasika Shekar, singer, flautist and composer
- Chen-Nee Chuah, American computer scientist and computer engineer
- William V. B. Van Dyck, American college football player and coach, electrical engineer, and businessman
