= Farmec =

Largest cosmetic manufacturer in Romania

Farmec S.A.
- Company type: Societate pe Acţiuni
- Industry: Chemical industry, Bioproducts engineering, Personal care
- Founded: 1889
- Headquarters: Cluj-Napoca, Romania
- Area served: Worldwide
- Key people: Mircea Turdan (CEO)
- Products: Cosmetics, Personal hygiene, Household hygiene
- Revenue: 121,000,000 RON (2012)
- Number of employees: 600 (2012)
- Website: www.farmec.ro/en

Farmec (meaning 'charm', in Romanian) is the largest cosmetics manufacturer in Romania. The company manufactures and sells beauty products, household hygiene products and other chemical products. Farmec is headquartered in Cluj-Napoca, where the company hosts a variety of its factors of production. As of 2013, the company possessed a large production plant in Cluj-Napoca and employed 600 people. Farmec benefits of an economy of scale.

Farmec is a S.A. type of company, the employees comprising a majority of the shareholders.

== History of Farmec ==
In 1889, the Molnar Moser laboratory was founded in Budapest.

During the Second World War, Mol-Mos, a laboratory affiliated with Molnar Moser was opened in Cluj-Napoca. This laboratory was nationalized and expanded; it became known as Cosmetic Company No. 21 (Întreprinderea de produse cosmetice Nr. 21 in Romanian) and later as the Farmec Factory of Cosmetic Products (Fabrica de Produse Cosmetice Farmec).

In 1995, Farmec was privatized via an employee buyout.

== Trading brands ==
Farmec products are commercialized under a variety of brands: Gerovital, Aslavital, Farmec, Doina, Aslamed, Triumf, Nufăr, Nufăr verde.

Each of these brands appeals to a different target audience. For example, Gerovital offers cosmetics such as Gerovital H3 serum, whereas Nufăr verde includes environmentally sustainable household cleaners.

== Gerovital H3 controversy ==
Farmec owns the production rights and trademark of the Gerovital H3 treatment. Gerovital H3, a serum developed by the Romanian doctor Ana Aslan claims to be an effective anti-aging treatment. The opinions about whether this chemical preparation is a medicine or a nutrient are mixed.
