= Ann Marie Carlton =

American chemist

- Born: New Jersey, U.S.

Academic background
- Education: Rutgers University (BS, MS, PhD)

Academic work
- Discipline: Chemistry, engineering
- Sub-discipline: Atmospheric chemistry Bioresource engineering Environmental engineering
- Institutions: University of California, Irvine; Office of Science and Technology Policy; United States Environmental Protection Agency; Air Resources Laboratory

Ann Marie Grover Carlton is an American academic working as a professor of chemistry at the University of California, Irvine, with expertise in atmospheric chemistry. She is a reviewing editor for the journal Science, and the winner of multiple awards and fellowships, notably the quadrennial Roger Revelle Fellowship for Global Stewardship from the American Association for the Advancement of Science. In this fellowship, she advised the Biden administration on climate and the environment in the Office of Science and Technology Policy, beginning in September 2021. Early in the COVID-19 pandemic, she was a proponent of the theory of airborne transmission of the virus, consequently appearing as an expert guest on NPR. She is the scientific leader on the Southern Oxidant & Aerosol Study (SOAS), the largest U.S. atmospheric chemistry field project in decades, for which the short documentary Skycatcher was made.

== Early life and education ==
Carlton was raised in Sayreville, New Jersey, and graduated from Sayreville War Memorial High School in 1991. She matriculated at Rutgers University, where she received her bachelor's degree in bioresource engineering from the Rutgers School of Engineering in 1995, followed by a Master of Science degree in bioenvironmental engineering in 1999 and a PhD in environmental science in 2006.

== Career ==
Prior to her doctorate, she was an environmental engineer with the United States Environmental Protection Agency in the agency's New York City-based second region.

Following her PhD, she worked as a research physical scientist for the Air Resources Laboratory from 2006 to 2008 and as a physical scientist for the EPA Office of Research and Development from 2008 to 2010, both at the Research Triangle Park.

Carlton returned to Rutgers in 2010 as an assistant professor in the department of environmental sciences. In 2016, she was hired as an associate professor in UCI's department of chemistry, being promoted to professor of chemistry in 2020.

Carlton has been awarded dozens of federal grants in support of her research. She has published over 70 peer-reviewed scientific articles and has an h-index of 40 as of 2024.

She was a member of the National Research Committee tasked with directing atmospheric chemistry research over the coming decades. She is an editor of Reviews of Geophysics and serves on the advisory board of the Royal Society of Chemistry’s Environmental Science: Atmosphere.

Carlton was the elected co-chair of the Gordon Conference on atmospheric chemistry from 2021 until 2023.

== Recognition ==
Carlton has won numerous awards and accolades during her career, including a 2017 ASCENT Award from the American Geophysical Union and was named a "Rising Star" by the American Chemical Society. She won the triennial Violet Diller Professional Excellence Award from Iota Sigma Pi in 2022. In 2024, she was elected fellow of the American Geophysical Union. In 2026, she was elected fellow of the American Association for the Advancement of Science.
