= Alvin Nienow =

British chemical engineer

Alvin William Nienow
- Born: 1937
- Died: 2022 (aged 84–85)

Academic background
- Education: University College London

Academic work
- Institutions: University of Birmingham; Aston University; Loughborough University

Alvin William Nienow was a British chemical engineer. He was emeritus professor of biochemical engineering at the University of Birmingham, where he was also director of the School of Chemical Engineering between 1989 and 1999. He was a fellow of both the Institution of Chemical Engineers and the Royal Academy of Engineering, and an honorary professor of Loughborough University. He was a visiting professor there and at Aston University. According to Scopus he has an h-index of 64.

== Books ==
- as editor, with Norman Harnby and Michael Frederick Edwards (1985). Mixing in the process industries. London: Butterworths. ISBN 0408115742.
