= Rutgers Formula Racing =

College racing club

- Established: 1989
- Students: Approximately 20 core members
- Location: Piscataway, New Jersey, USA
- Website: https://www.rutgersformularacing.com

Rutgers Formula Racing (previously known as Rutgers Formula SAE) is a collegiate club within the Rutgers University School of Engineering which competes in the Formula SAE Design Series.

== History ==
=== 1989 ===
Rutger's Formula Team organized and several members attended the 1989 event at South West Research Institute in San Antonio, Texas. Design of the first car began in the fall of 1989 alongside fund raising activities. Ford Motor Company was the first monetary supporter of the team with a $5000. Dean Dill soon followed with a donation from the school's Alumni Association fund. SAE Metropolitan Section was another key early sponsor that got Rutger's FSAE program going. SAE's shop took residence in a cleaned up section of the boiler room off of the main MAE lab. Also during this same time frame, Rutger's MAE department bought a new Bridgeport Mill and Harrison Lathe.

=== 1990 ===
Major design and fabrication work on the first car was completed in 1990. The car utilized a Ninja 600 engine and 10 inch wheels. Wheelbase was 61 inches and the track was 60 inches front 58 inches rear. The car was not ready for the 1990 competition; however, the rolling chassis was brought to the event which was held at Lawrence Tech.

=== 1991 ===
The 1991 competition was held at the GM Proving Grounds aka "Black Lake." This was the first entry for a Rutgers car into the Formula SAE competition. A modified Ford ECU was being used to control the engine, but it never really worked. The car never ran on its own power with this ECU installed.

This car won the "Best Suspension Award" which was judged by Terry Satchell. Bill Mitchell's suspension software was awarded to the team.

=== 1992 ===
The 1992 Formula SAE competition was held at Ford's Research and Engineering campus in Dearborn, Michigan. The 1991 car was updated with an Electromotive ECU. Approximately 60 hours of dyno testing was performed on this motor and numerous track sessions. Rear wheel Hp was 73. This car earned 3rd Place in Acceleration. The car completed all events except the second heat of endurance due to the failure of a suspension linkage eye end.

=== 1994 ===
Rutgers entered its first carbon fiber monocoque in the 1994 competition at the Pontiac Silverdome. The front half of the car was constructed of pre-preg carbon fiber with a Nomex honeycomb core. 3 sandwich panel aluminum bulkheads were used to mount the front suspension and master cylinders. The rear half of the car was constructed of 4130 steel tubing. One of the most dramatic features of the car was the use of very long lower A-Arms. They were so long, that there was only about 1 inch of space between the left and right mounts on the chassis. The composite construction made use of very simple molds made primarily from sheetmetal and wood. There were no compound curves to any of the molds for the monocoque. Shifting was performed by steering wheel push buttons via pneumatics (an FSAE first). The brakes used 200mm OD cast iron vented rotors. The engine was a naturally aspirated Kawasaki Ninja 600R, making 73 RWHp.
Result Highlights:
Presentation - 7th Place,
Design - 13th Place,
Acceleration - 13th Place,
Skid Pad - 5th Place,
Autocross - 3rd Place,
Endurance - 7th Place (22 Cones and 3 spin outs),
Economy - 6th,
Overall - 9th
This car earned the "Best Prototype Fabrication Award"

=== 1995 ===
Car #9 - This was the second year entry of the 1994 car. Carbon fiber wheels were custom built for the car.

1995 Competition Results:
Cost: 31 points
Presentation: 14.2 points
Design: 82 points
Acceleration: 46.25 points
Skid pad: 34.4 points
Autocross: 130.4 points
Endurance: 171.1 points
Economy: 22.5 points
Overall: 22nd / 531.9 points

=== 1997 ===
Car #68

1997 Competition Results:
Cost: 54.53 points
Presentation: 60.5 points
Design: 110 points
Acceleration: DNF
Skid pad: 5.59 points
Autocross: 45.0 points
Endurance: 153.0 points
Overall: 22nd / 428.67 points

=== 1998 ===
Car # 22

First time an entirely new car was designed and fabricated from scratch at Rutgers in a school year. The car earned a spot in design semi finals. Utilized a 600CC Honda F3 motor. First time a motor was semi stressed in this program. Incorporated outboard shocks, which seemed to be going a step back, but they worked quite well. CV joints were applied after a long hiatus since the first car. Switched to a single inboard rear brake rotor. All three aluminum brake rotors failed during the morning heat of endurance. New rotors were made by the afternoon, but the car ultimately did not finish endurance due to a throttle control issue (jam nut came loose).

1998 Competition Results:
Cost: 65.0 Points
Presentation: 63.8 Points
Design: 127.0 Points
Acceleration: 48.26 Points
Skid Pad: 29.97 Points
Autocross: 98.05 Points
Endurance: DNF
Total: 32nd / 432.12 points

=== 1999 ===
Car #67

The 1998 car was utilized for a second year with slight improvements and adjustments to meet the current years rules. The changes included: Adjustable pedals, conversion from the air shifter to a mechanical lever arm for enhanced reliability, new differential mounting brackets to ease chain adjustments, new main roll hoop to meet new chassis regulations, and a full carbon fiber foot box, also to meet new chassis regulations.

The car weighed just over 500 lbs.

The differential failed during endurance due to lack of safety wire on the main bolts. Early model Tosen differentials are assembled with three main bolts that hold the two housing together in the axial direction. These bolts loosened during the endurance event, which created a large gap between the two main gears and the friction washer.

This car is currently undergoing a full restoration by Rutgers FSAE alumni

1999 Competition Results:
Cost: 59.14 points
Presentation: 31.26 points
Design: 65 points
Acceleration: 51.94 points
Skid Pad: 17.51 points
Autocross: 109.5 points
Endurance: DNF
Overall: 40th / 334.4 points

=== 2000 ===
Car # 67

The year 2000 car marked the return to inboard suspension. However, the mounting posts for the bell cranks caused cracks in the main frame tubes. This car utilized the same engine, differential, and rear chassis subframe configurations as the 1998 and 1999 cars. However, a new rear upright and half shaft designs were implemented to eliminate cv joint failure and to reduce overall weight. The remainder of the chassis was fully redesigned from the engine forward.

Earned a 3rd place Bosch powertrain award for a novel variable length intake runner system.

=== 2001 ===
Car #56

The 2001 car featured upgrades and lessons learned from the 2000 car which include improved bellcrank mounting and lighter front uprights. New rear suspension geometry (new rear subframe) was also introduced this year.

2001 competition results:
Cost: 78.4 points
Presentation: 30.9 Points
Design: 60.0 Points
Acceleration: 47.18 Points
Skid Pad: 39.24 Points
Autocross: 62.28 Points
Endurance: 290.12 Points
Overall: 15th / 608.1 Points

=== 2002 ===
Car #36

The 2002 Car was a revised version of the 2001 Car, with the engine changed from the Honda to the 2001 Yamaha R6. A coil on plug was implemented by wiring the coils directly to the output blades on the TEC II (the pins that normally connect to the GM coils). The team placed 17th overall. Taking home the Highest Horsepower Award(NA) The team and car were featured in a RU-TV News Segment. The 2002 Car was ultimately wrecked in early 2003 in the Stadium Lot during new upgrades testing for the 2003 car. This occurred when the driver, using the new paddle operated electronic shifter, pulled multiple downshifts at high speed, shifting into first gear and causing a loss of control due to virtual lock-up of the rear wheels. The car hit a curb, shearing the dropped seat bottom off the car, and then hit a small tree. The chassis was badly damaged. The driver was bruised and sore, but had no major injuries. The helmet he was wearing hit the steering wheel and was thus retired.

2002 Competition Results:
Cost: 17th / 79.6 points
Presentation: 27th / 54.7 points
Design: 76th / 60 points
Acceleration: DNF
Skid Pad: 41st / 16.75 points / 5.759
Autocross: 18th / 91.19 points / 81.4 secs
Endurance: 13th / 252.07 points / 1770.9 secs
Total: 17th / 554.271 points

=== 2003 ===
Car #42

Completion of the car was very far behind. The car was ultimately able to pass all parts of tech inspection in time to be the very last car to run endurance. The chain fell off in the next to last lap of the event (second driver) due to the retaining clip on the master link falling off. This car had a chain which rubbed a friction surface on an interfering chassis tube, which may have contributing to knocking the clip off.

After the competition the interfering tube was cut out with a reciprocating saw and a diagonal tube was welded in so that the chain did not interfere. This setup lasted many drive days until eventually causing a crack in one of the original chassis tubes.

The car used a custom designed electronic shifting actuator made from a standard RC car motor and a planetary gear box from a power drill. While the actuator was very powerful, the system required an electronic controller because the motor could not be turned on for more than a quarter second without damaging the brushes or windings. The overall actuator weight was around 1.2 lbs. There were positive and negative results of the system. With new brushes in the motor and proper tweaking it was capable of very fast shifts (~15 ms), and was able to perform very well for automatic up-shifting during acceleration runs. However, the brushed motor was unreliable in this implementation (very low rev, turning only a few turns at a time, commonly stalled), which meant that the motor required constant tinkering. Further problems included the use of 1st gear on this car which led to frequent neutral-out conditions.

2003 Competition Results:
Cost: 40th / 77.7 points
Presentation: 32nd / 54.1 points
Design: 71st / 60 points
Acceleration: DNF
Skid Pad: DNF
Autocross: DNF
Endurance: DNF
Overall: 85th / 191.8 Points

=== 2004 ===
Car # 29

The ECU was switched from the Electromotive TEC2 to the relatively new Performance Electronics ECU.

The custom built Backseat Driver telemetery and data acquisition system was first used this year. It was a dashboard mounted unit with a rudimentary on-board LED display, and entirely through-hole based circuit board with a remote mounted accelerometer and telemetry radio.

The car did not finish endurance. The second driver was black flagged for missing a blue (pass) flag. Later review of video revealed a track worker in a low visibility location waving the blue flag. After the penalty time, with engine off, the engine would not start. The battery was drained after continued cranking without firing. Based on telemetry, coolant temperature was in the high 250 range during this period. It was later noted that the PE ECU's starting enrichments cut off after 255 degrees (the maximum setting).

2004 Competition Results:
Cost: 43rd / 75.1 Points
Presentation: 44th / 54 Points
Design: 48th / 80 Points
Acceleration: 10th / 63.1 Points / 4.343 secs
Skid Pad: 20th / 38.2 Points / 5.412 secs
Autocross: 16th / 103 Points / 52.225 Secs
Endurance: DNF
OVERALL: 40th / 413.4 Points

=== 2005 ===
Car # 54

In response to previous years rear subframe issues along with changing competition trends, 2005 was first year to utilize an aluminum plate rear subframe created via water jet. This design provided quick and accurate creation of subframe and also maintained precise suspension points.

Power plant was still the 2001 Yamaha R6 with a new drivetrain design utilizing the same Torsen Differential housed in a single piece housing to increase reliability.

2005 Competition: Car was driven through competition without roll bars due to trouble with fabrication / and longevity. Summer testing after competition T-style rear sway bar was created and worked reliably. RFR '05 started competition utilizing previous mentioned "RC motor style" shifter, but due to reliability issues shifter was switched to a mechanical stylethe night before endurance and ensured car finished endurance event. During the event there were still hard shifting characteristics due to zero to no testing on shifter or driver training.

2005 Competition Results:
Cost - 41st / 80.8 points
Presentation - 19th / 63.0 Points
Design - 14th / 100 Points
Acceleration - 27th / 51.9 points / 4.486 sec
Skid Pad - 67th / 18.0 points / 5.794 Sec
Autocross - 17th / 98.1 points / 60.226 Secs
Endurance - 23rd / 245.6 points / 1608.599 secs
OVERALL - 17th / 657.512 points

Note: Endurance Economy 1.111 Gallons used

=== 2006 ===
Car # 48

2006 car was a completely new chassis and component car. 2005 & 2006 were rolling side by side. Optimization of the 2005 package yielded a car 30 lbs lighter, weighing in at roughly 465 lbs fully fueled and ready to drive. A number of improvements were made based on experience with the previous car and recommendations from design judges.

The changes recommended by the design judges included the addition of floating brake rotors and the removal of rod ends at the outboard ball joints.

Improvements to the car included:
Reworked method for rear differential adjustment. Diff was the same style except further optimized to reduce weight
Reworked front camber adjustment.
Shifter was a mechanical push/pull cable paddle shifter.

Performance in the acceleration and skidpad events was limited by running in wet conditions with 1 season old rain tires. All other dynamic events were run in the dry.

2006 Competition Results:
Cost: 47th / 80.6 points
Presentation: 18th / 61.7 points
Design: 40th / 70 points
Acceleration: 48th / 33.3 points / 5.027 secs
Skid pad: 40th / 2.5 points / 6.247 secs
Autocross: 21st / 104.5 points / 49.348 secs
Endurance: 9th / 331.9 points / 1553.229 secs
OVERALL: 16th / 684.4 points

Note: Endurance Economy 1.283 gallons used

=== 2007 ===
Car # 58

2007 Competition Results:
Cost: 48th / 77.5 Points
Presentation: 83rd / 34.9 Points
Design: 38th / 80 Points
Acceleration: DNF
Skid Pad: DNF
Autocross: DNF
Endurance: DNF
Total: 87th / 192.3 points

=== 2008 ===
Car #58

Competition Results:
Cost: 34th / 80.5 points
Presentation: 90th / 33.7 points
Design: 37th / 80 points
Acceleration: 19th / 56.9 points
Skid Pad: 56th / 18.2 points
Autocross: 66th / 41.4 points
Endurance: DNF
Total: 60th / 310.7 points

=== 2009 ===
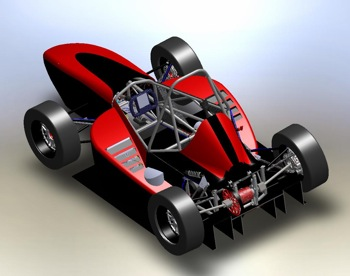
Official Model of the RFR-09.

There was notable redesign of most systems creating an overall new "platform". The Yamaha R6 engine was replaced with the 2007 Honda CBR 600rr. The aluminum rear subframe was scrapped and the chassis was reverted to a one piece steel tube design. The team competed in two competitions, VIR and MIS. Highlights were 3rd place in Acceleration at VIR, and a tie for 3rd place in Design at MIS. The MIS Design finish was originally a tie with one other team for 5th place after semi-finals, two of the Design finalists had a 35-point penalty for not passing the new template rules, causing the first place team to tie with the two 5th place teams for 3rd place in points.

A paddle actuated hydraulic clutch was designed which had a custom master cylinder concentric with the steering shaft. Shifting was originally via a large off-the-shelf electric solenoid (actually two solenoids inline which acted in opposite directions), but the windings for one of the internal solenoids burned out the Sunday before the VIR competition (the team left on the Tuesday morning after this). Parts were gathered from old (~10 years previous or more) pneumatic shifting setups that were stored in various places, and the following day CO_{2} tanks and various other parts were bought at a paint ball supply store and a pneumatic shifter was on the car by 4am Tuesday morning. This system used the same switches that actuated the original shifter, which were mounted on a collar on the steering shaft. The shift paddles pushed small pushrods which were in holes drilled in the quick release and protruded when the paddle was pulled to push the microswitch levers.

The car weighed in at 499 lbs with a carbon fiber aerodynamic undertray at VIR, and was reduced to 465 at MIS after the undertray was removed and other components streamlined.

VIR Endurance The first driver completed the first half of the event, with about 4 cones and no off course penalties. The car was overheating and the overflow tank was venting steam. The car was inspected by the event officials and allowed to go back out. At the end of the driver change the coolant temperature was around 265, and with some hesitation the engine started. The second driver locked up the front wheels going into the corner after the first straight, and ended up stalling the engine. With a coolant temperature around 275 degrees, the engine would not restart. It cranked very slowly although the battery voltage was showing a full charge. After the Endurance course was closed, the now cooled down car was brought back to the paddock where it fired up immediately with no charging of the battery.

MIS Endurance Due to the problems in the VIR Endurance and in testing, a larger battery was added to the car for this event (14 amp-hour), and a second fan was installed on the radiator as well as a duct in front of the radiator. After about 7 laps by the first driver the downshift microswitch got stuck and held the pneumatic actuator in the down-shift position. The transmission ended up in first gear, and would not come out of first because the up-shift solenoid could not overcome the already actuated down-shift solenoid. At the end of the 10th lap, the coolant temperature was around 270F. At the final turn of the final lap, the checkered flag was displayed approximately 1 second before the car reached the official holding the flag (based on video slow-motion). The driver did not see the flag and continued around the course. Based on telemetry data, it is evident that there was a loss of oil pressure by about 90% while the coolant temperature was around 270 during this 11th lap. By the ½ way point of the 11th lap the engine began to misfire badly and the driver decided to pull over. At this point the overflow tank was still steaming. The driver was instructed by track workers to cut the engine, and the car was immediately towed away. After watching the video of the event, it was decided that the team leaders would make a complaint to the event organizers regarding the late flag. The whole situation was explained to one of the main organizers, and he informed them that missed flags occur constantly and they just can't do anything about it. He went on say that if the driver was not given the 3-minute period stipulated in the rules to restart the engine and continue driving, that it may have been a mistake on their part, and he would talk to the event captain and see what could be done. After 10 minutes he returned to the paddock and explained that the event captain wanted us to return to the course with our second driver and attempt the second half of the event. He further explained that he and the track workers would later inspect the notes and any video evidence, and only if there was definitive proof that the driver was not offered his 3-minute restart period would they consider the second driver's laps and give us point for the event. The car was immediately returned and the second driver entered the track. The second driver immediately noticed that the sound of the engine was off, and after the first slow section of the course shifted into 3rd gear for the remained of the first lap. At the start of the second lap, the car was passed, and upon pulling onto the course again the driver noticed an increase in the vibration from the engine. The driver then shifted into 4th gear to further reduce the engine RPM. Before the half-way point of the 2nd lap (right before the back sweeper) a loud bang was heard from the engine, and the car began shaking violently. The driver continued through the back sweeper and then pulled off the side of the course. Before being towed back, the driver was handed a small, oily chain by one of the track workers who believed that it came from our engine (which it did). Upon inspection there was a hole in the front bottom of the engine near the #1 cylinder.

Other notable events and facts from 2009:

First time the shop in the Packaging Engineering Building was used as a main shop. The chassis was built in this shop and carried through the single door before the final assembly of the car.

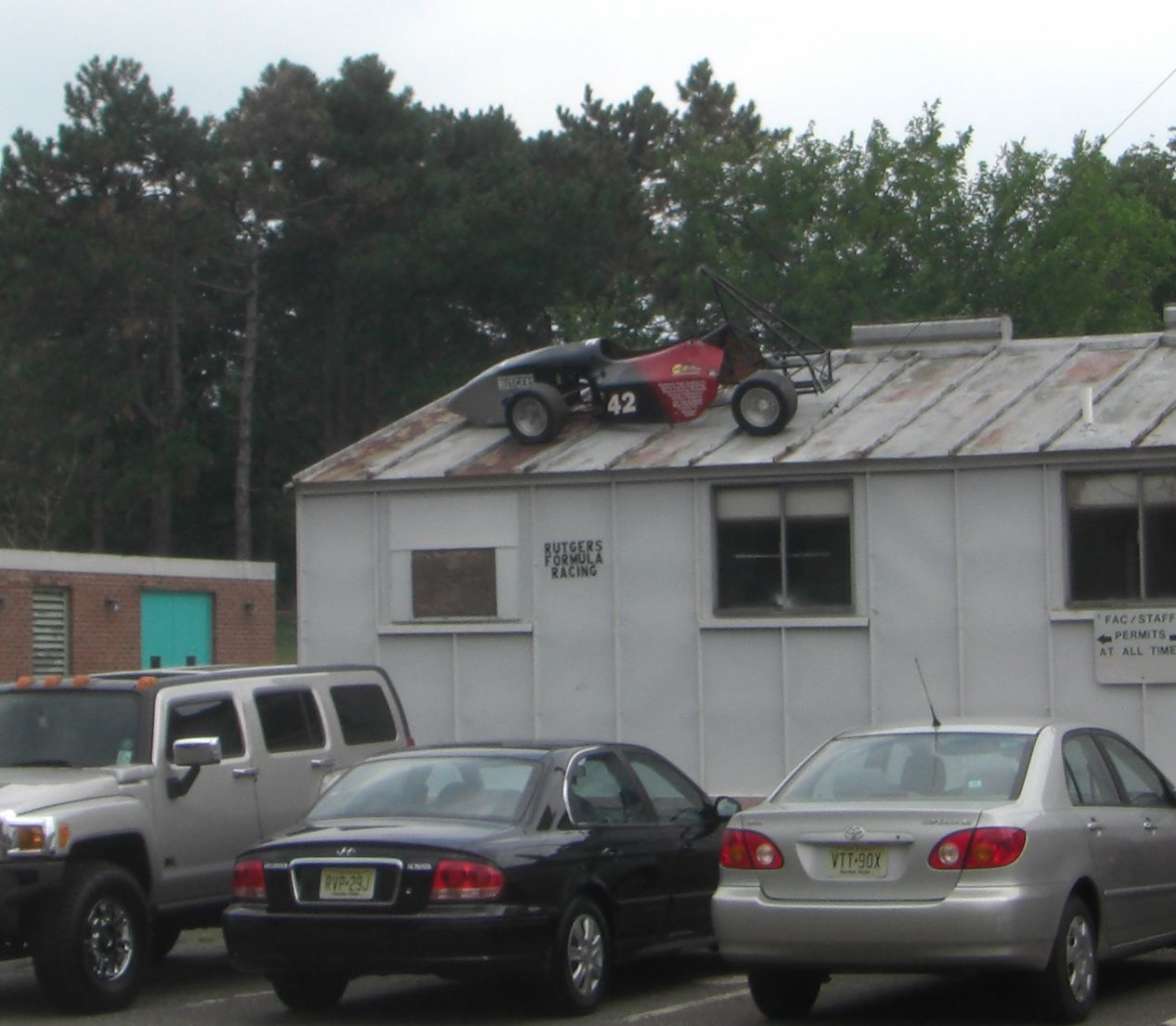
The RFR-03 chassis and body mounted to the roof of one of the shops.

Addition of the "car on the roof". This is the chassis and body of the 2003 car which has been strapped to the roof of the shop with wire rope.

The team unofficially adopted Africa by ToTo as the theme song for the 2009 season.

Testing at the Goodyear facility in Akron, Ohio in October, 2008.

VIR Car #14

VIR Competition Results:
Cost: 20th / 44 points
Presentation: 18th / 52.3 points
Design: 9th / 75 points
Acceleration: 3rd / 59.5 points
Skid Pad: 10th / 30.1 points
Autocross: 13th / 72.2 points
Endurance: DNF
Overall: 13 th / 333.1 points

MIS Car #26

MIS Competition Results:
Cost: 20th / 78 points
Presentation: 4th / 68.8 points
Design: 3rd / 115 points
Acceleration: 27th / 50.8 points
Skid Pad: 45th / 17.5 points
Autocross: 64th / 17.8 points
Endurance: DNF
Overall: 40th / 347.8 points

=== 2011 ===
2011 was a significant year for Rutgers Formula Racing. The team gained exceptional recognition in tri-state and among other clubs at Rutgers University. The 2011 team was given the Outstanding Organization of The Year Award. The team has also exhibited at the annual New York International Auto Show. The overall design of the car did not see a notable difference although the manufactured parts and bodywork have considered to deem the RFR11 the best looking car the team has built to the date. The team competed in two competitions just as in 2010, FSAE East, in Michigan (MIS) and FSAE West, in California (ACS). 2011 is the first year team has started using the Drexler Salisbury type differential. The car weighed in at 460 lbs at Michigan International Raceway, and was increased to 465 at Autoclub Speedway.

FSAE Michigan 2011 Dynamic Events The day before the competition was the first drive of RFR11 which ended up with the Electromotive ECU crank position sensor to move slightly inside the crank case, hitting the crank trigger wheel, which led to an engine failure. The sensor was replaced overnight and a new wheel was welded on. The engine was not fired until the 2nd day of the competition after the technical inspections. On the 3rd day, the engine fired ok for the first acceleration event but the starter wheel gave out (possibly due to a misalignment during installation). The team replaced the engine within 1.5 hours to make it to the AutoX event in the afternoon, but had to skip Skid-Pad event. First driver successfully completed the AutoX run and the second driver did not complete his 2nd run after the engine started over-heating due to an electrical failure on the radiator fan.

FSAE Michigan 2011 Endurance The first driver completed the first half of the event with no problems. As he was getting out of the car, he instructed the second driver to be cautious and take it slow. The second driver conducted his stint at mainly part throttle and through corners would hold the clutch in and then keep the RPMs high due to the belief that the engine was dying. The car was running ok but the 2nd driver was black flagged and had to pull in because of a malfunctioning brake light switch. As pulling in the pit lane, the driver quickly realized the problem and was able to pull back the brake pedal with his foot in order to be able to finish the rest of the race. For the remaining of the race, the driver pulled the brake pedal back with his foot every time he hit the brakes, which resulted him with very slow laptimes. Since the car was not tuned well for the RPM range that the driver was keeping the car at, the car ran out of fuel and DNF'ed from Endurance 2 laps before it could finish.

Other notable events and facts from MIS 2011:

The president of RFR has received the Most Valuable Member of the Year Award from SAE International.

FSAE California 2011 Dynamic Events Due to the problems in the MIS Endurance, the new team has excessively tested the car and made the necessary adjustments under 8 days, before the car was shipped to Fontana, California. All dynamic events, including Endurance were successfully completed.

FSAE California 2011 Endurance An extra fan was added to the radiator and all rod-ends were replaced before endurance. Because of a loose connection on the car's telemetry system (Back Seat Driver), the car had no RPM readings visible to the driver for the entire competition. The tune of the car was significantly different than the week after FSAE Michigan, therefore more tuning adjustments were completed before endurance. First driver completed the first 11 laps with no problems; towards the end of the race, the car had almost no fuel, causing an engine stall during hard left turns. Although there was only a small amount of fuel left, the car was able to complete the Endurance event.

RFR11 at FSAE California 2011 Endurance Event

Other notable events and facts from FSAE California 2011: First time in five years that the Rutgers car has finished all events in single competition.

Michigan Car #63

MIS Competition Results:
Cost: 19th / 81.7 points
Presentation: 45th / 51.2 points
Design: 37th / 80 points
Acceleration: 60th / 19.4 points
Skid Pad: DNA / 0 points
Autocross: 33rd/ 71.0 points
Endurance: DNF / 26.0 <points
Overall: 53rd / 309.2 points

California Car #73

MIS Competition Results:
Cost: 12th / 69.69 points
Presentation: 24th / 51.6 points
Design: 18th / 92 points
Acceleration: 12th / 58.81 points (4.227 sec.)
Skid Pad: 26th / 19.5 points
Autocross: 19th / 57.83 points
Endurance: 14th / 186 points
Economy: 29th / -2.4 points
Overall: 14th / 553.1 points

=== 2012 ===
Michigan Car #58

MIS Competition Results:
Cost: 57th / 69.01 points
Presentation: 68th / 38.4 points
Design: 28th / 80 points
Acceleration: 21st / 54.22 points
Skid Pad: 41st / 23.01 points
Autocross: 17th / 69.81 points
Endurance: 22nd / 163.0 points
Economy: 23rd / 61.3 points
Overall: 18th / 558.8 points

=== 2014 ===
Formula SAE Michigan Car #122

Formula North

=== 2015 ===
The original proposal for the RFR15 came during initial discussions for the 2013-2014 competition cycle. This proposal looked at an overall platform change in order to ready the team and the vehicle to be able to implement a full aerodynamic package that was starting to trend among the top teams of the Formula SAE. Due to massive restrictions in cost, timing, manpower, and manufacturing technologies available to the team, this drive for a platform redesign was tabled as a future undertaking of the Rutgers Formula Racing team and a new sub-team was launched to begin design and development activities for aerodynamics. However, the perfect opportunity would come sooner than originally expected only weeks after FSAE Michigan 2014.

RFR15 would serve as the new platform to push the team towards an implementation of a full aerodynamics package.

- All-new aerodynamic package.
- All-new powertrain system.
- Redesigned suspension system with space-frame chassis.

The new team philosophy would include added focus for additional activities:

- Implementation of New Funding Goals and Objectives
- Implementation of New Recruitment Strategy
- Renewed Relations and Support with the Rutgers Department of Mechanical and Aerospace Engineering
- Increased Support from Rutgers School of Engineering and the Rutgers Engineering Governing Council

Formula SAE Michigan Car #61 Results
Cost: 70.4 / 65th
Presentation: 59.9 / 27th
Design: 50 / 104th
Acceleration: DNA
Skid Pad: DNA
Autocross: DNA
Endurance: DNA
Overall: 180.4 / 90th

=== 2016 ===
Exhibition of the team including past vehicles and current build in progress.

=== 2017 ===
Formula SAE Michigan
Car #50 Results
Cost: 64.97 / 53rd
Presentation: 57.9 / 25th
Design: 100 / 18th
Acceleration: 54.55 (Best Time: 4.899 s) / 64th
Skid Pad: 37.87 (Best Time: 5.339 s) / 37th
Autocross: 66.15 (Best Time: 48.797 s) / 33rd
Endurance: 11 (Best Lap Time: 62.436 s)/ DNF (Failed to restart)
Overall: 392.4 / 54th

Formula North 2017
Car #30 Results
Cost: 42 / 18th
Presentation: 50 / 18th
Design: 85 / 14th
Acceleration: 41.65 (Best time: 4.871 / 20th
Skid Pad: 40.51 (Best time: 5.514) / 13th
Endurance: 250 / 3rd
Overall: 603.29 / 6th

== Organization ==
Rutgers Formula Racing is a 100% student-run organization, and as of 2017 has the following administrative structure:

Team President

President is the external face of Rutgers Formula Racing. Works with the faculty advisor and team project management to ensure compliance with university policies. He or she is the primary point of contact for the university and its affiliates, Formula SAE and the SAE Collegiate Design Series, sponsors and their affiliates, and any other external organizations. Member of the Rutgers Formula Racing Executive Board.

Vice president

Vice president assists the president with any team logistics and duties. Member of the Rutgers Formula Racing executive board.

Treasurer Maintains finances and accounting of the team, prepares and sets the organization's budget with the Rutgers University Engineering Governing Council (EGC), sets individual sub-system team budgets, and establishes funding targets. Member of the Rutgers Formula Racing Executive Board.

Engineering Governing Council Representative Represents the Rutgers Formula Racing organization within the Rutgers University Engineering Governing Council. Actively participates in EGC committees and communicates any information to the Rutgers Formula Racing Executive Board and team. Member of the Rutgers Formula Racing Executive Board.

Project manager and design leads
The project manager and design leads are responsible for the design and assembly car built. He or she resolve design contentions, acts as a technical interface between the sub-system responsible engineers, and sets the priorities of the team. He or she keeps track of every individual project related to the design, maintains the updated CAD model and technical drawings of the car, and reports on the status of engineering design and manufacturing projects during general team meetings.

Sub-system team leaders

Sub-system Team Leaders (a.k.a. 'Sub-Team Leaders') are responsible for the design and fabrication of his or her respective sub-system. Sub-team leaders typically set sub-system design and functional objectives and maintain any relevant documentation necessary to compete and ensure compliance with FSAE Competition events, rules, and regulations.

- Mechanical Powertrain
- Aerodynamics
- Suspension
- Chassis
- Controls/Brakes
- Electronics
- Composites
- Media
- Business Presentation/Cost/BOM

== Funding ==
Each "year" or "season" runs from June to May of the next year. For example, the 2000 season would run from June 1999 to May 2000. The major categories for funding sources are funds from the university, crowdfunding, private sponsors, and member contributions. The majority of university funding comes from the Engineering Governing Council (EGC). Other university entities have offered funding in some years, such as the Mechanical Engineering Department, the Alumni Association, and others.
