= Bioproduct =

Biological materials

Bioproducts (or bio-based products) are materials, chemicals, and energy derived from biological material.

== Bioresources ==
Biological resources include agriculture, forestry, and biologically derived waste, and there are many other renewable bioresource examples.

=== Example ===
One of the examples of renewable bioresources is lignocellulose. Lignocellulosic tissues are biologically derived natural resources containing some of the main constituents of the natural world.

1. Holocellulose is the carbohydrate fraction of lignocellulose that includes cellulose, a common building block made of sugar (glucose) that is the most abundant biopolymer, as well as hemicellulose. Recent advances in the catalytic conversion of platform chemicals from this biomass fraction have attracted industry and academia alike.
2. Lignin is the second most abundant biopolymer. Cellulose and lignin are two of the primary natural polymers used by plants to store energy as well as to give strength, as is the case in woody plant tissues. Other energy storage chemicals in plants include oils, waxes, fats, etc., and because these other plant compounds have distinct properties, they offer potential for a host of different bioproducts.

== Categorization ==
Conventional bioproducts and emerging bioproducts are two broad categories used to categorize bioproducts. Examples of conventional bio-based products include building materials, pulp and paper, and forest products. Examples of emerging bioproducts or biobased products include biofuels, bioenergy, starch-based and cellulose-based ethanol, bio-based adhesives, biochemicals, bioplastics, etc. Emerging bioproducts are active subjects of research and development, and these efforts have developed significantly since the turn of the 20/21st century, in part driven by the price of traditional petroleum-based products, by the environmental impact of petroleum use, and by an interest in many countries to become independent from foreign sources of oil. Bioproducts derived from bioresources can replace much of the fuels, chemicals, plastics etc. that are currently derived from petroleum

== Bioproducts engineering ==
Bioproducts engineering (also referred to as bioprocess engineering) refers to engineering of bio-products from renewable bioresources. This pertains to the design, development and implementation of processes, technologies for the sustainable manufacture of materials, chemicals and energy from renewable biological resources.

=== Alternative definitions ===
- Bioprocess Engineering is a specialization of Biotechnology, Chemical Engineering or Biological Engineering or of Agricultural Engineering. It deals with the design and development of equipment and processes for the manufacturing of products such as food, feed, pharmaceuticals, nutraceuticals, chemicals, and polymers and paper from biological materials. Bioprocess engineering is a conglomerate of mathematics, biology and industrial design, and consists of various spectrums like designing of Fermentors, study of fermentors (mode of operations etc.). It also deals with studying various biotechnological processes used in industries for large scale production of biological product for optimization of yield in the end product and the quality of end product. Bio process engineering may include the work of mechanical, electrical and industrial engineers to apply principles of their disciplines to processes based on using living cells or sub component of such cells
- Bioresource engineering is related to the applications of biological engineering, chemical engineering and agricultural engineering usually based on biological and/or agricultural feedstocks. Bioresource engineering is more general and encompasses a wider range of technologies and various elements such as biomass, biological waste treatment, bioenergy, biotransformations and bioresource systems analysis, and technologies associated with Thermochemical conversion technologies: combustion, pyrolysis, gasification, catalysis, etc. Biochemical conversion technologies: aerobic methods, anaerobic digestion, microbial growth processes, enzymatic methods, composting Products: fibre, fuels, feedstocks, fertilisers, building materials, polymers and other industrial products Management: modelling, systems analysis, decisions, support systems. The impact of urbanization and increasing demand for land, food, and water presents engineers in a world with serious challenges. Little attention has been given to the interface between the biological world and traditional engineering in the past. It is the job of bioresource engineers to fill that gap. Agricultural and bioresource engineers develop efficient and environmentally-sensitive methods of producing food, fiber, timber, bio-based products and renewable energy sources for an ever-increasing world population.

== See also ==
- Biofact (biology)
- Biomass
- Biomass (ecology)
- Bioprocess
- Forest
- Outline of forestry
- Biogas
- Biorefining
- Bioenergy
- Biofuels
- Biochemicals
- Bioprocess engineering
- Bioresource engineering
- Non-timber forest products
- European Biomass Association
