= Ana Aslan =

Romanian biologist and physician of Armenian origin (1897–1988)

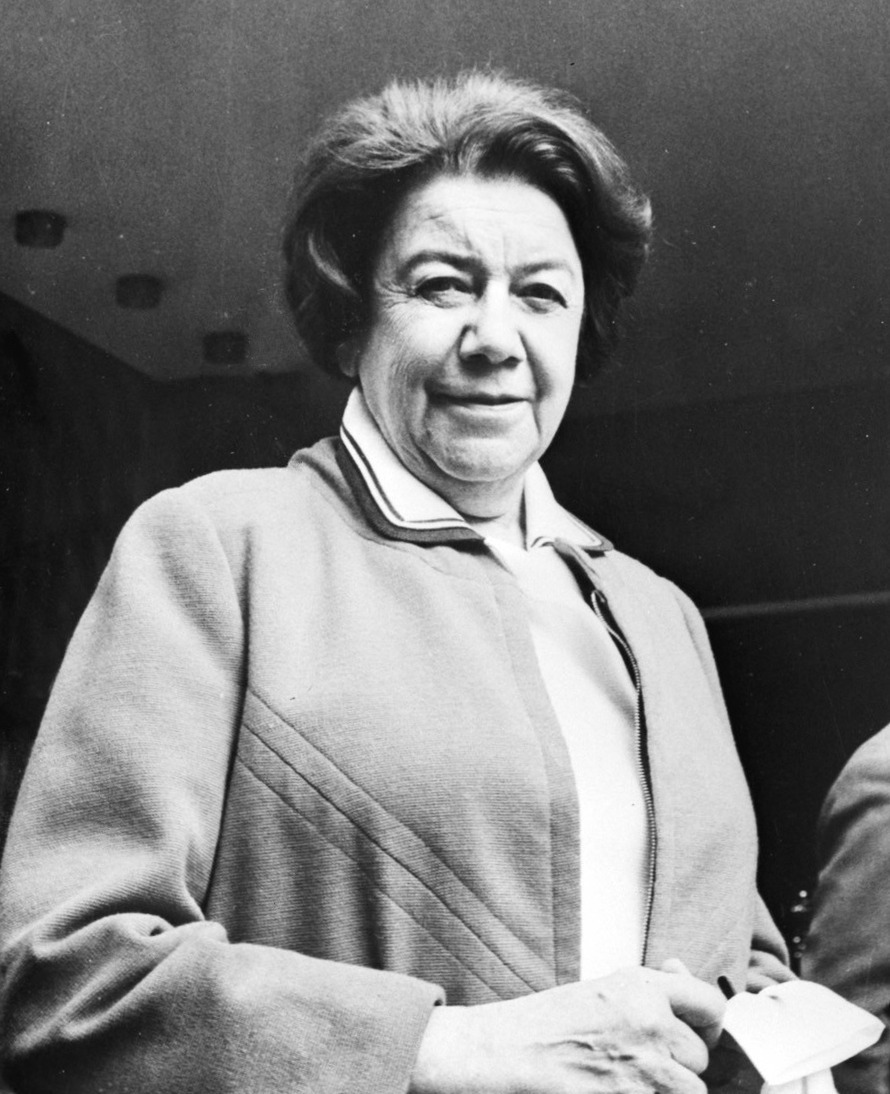
- Ana Aslan in 1970
- Born: 1 January 1897; Brăila, Kingdom of Romania
- Died: 20 May 1988 (aged 91); Bucharest, Socialist Republic of Romania
- Resting place: Bellu Cemetery, Bucharest
- Education: Faculty of Medicine, Bucharest (1915–1922)
- Known for: Gerovital
- Scientific career
- Fields: Gerontology, Geriatrics
- Workplaces: National Institute of Gerontology and Geriatrics (founder)

Ana Aslan (Romanian pronunciation: [ˈana asˈlan]; 1 January 1897 – 20 May 1988), born Anna Aslanyan, was a Romanian biologist and physician of partial Armenian descent. She was born in Brăila and died in Bucharest. Aslan was a specialist in gerontology, academician from 1974 and the director of the National Institute of Geriatrics and Gerontology (1958–1988) known for her invention of the drug Gerovital (H3). Aslan received international recognition for her research in gerontology.

== Early life ==
Ana was the youngest of four children, two brothers and two sisters, born to Mkrtitch and Sofia Aslanyans. Ana was said to be a very intellectual child, learning to read and write already by age four. At the age of 13, her father died, and her family then moved to Bucharest, Romania.

In Bucharest she began her studies, and graduated from the Central School of Bucharest in 1915. Despite significant challenges for women in the medical field, Aslan went on to attend the Faculty of Medicine from 1915 to 1922. When her mother refused to support her decision to become a physician for financial reasons, Ana Aslan went on hunger strike until her mother accepted her medical career. During her time in undergraduate studies, she attended to soldiers as a nurse during the First World War.

== Research ==
After graduating from the Faculty of Medicine in 1922, she began working with Daniel Danielopolu who supervised her doctoral thesis. She obtained her M.D. degree in cardiovascular physiology in 1924. Her focus was on physiology and the process of ageing. While experimenting on the effects that procaine had on arthritis, Aslan discovered other beneficial effects of this drug. It was this discovery that led to a three-year study and eventual invention of her drug called Gerovital (H3), which she prescribed for the effects of aging. With hesitation from fellow scientists that Gerovital was a "fountain of youth", Aslan launched a research study to prove the results. Over a period of two years, blood samples were taken from 15,000 people, with some of them receiving Gerovital and some receiving a placebo. 40% of the people who took Gerovital had less sick-leave days, and mortality rate from the flu epidemic was 13% in placebo patients while only being 2.7% in patients who took the drug. In 1976, with a pharmacist named Elena Polovrăgeanu, they invented another drug named Aslavital, which was a similar drug to Gerovital aimed to delay the skin aging process.

== Other work ==
Ana Aslan was considered a pioneer of social medicine. Some years after becoming the head of the physiology department at the Institute of Endocrinology of Bucharest, she founded the Institute of Geriatrics of Bucharest. In 1959, she organized the Romanian Society of Gerontology and Geriatrics.

Ana Aslan patented two cosmetic products (hair lotion and cream Gerovital H3), entrusting their production to Farmec company and Miraj. The two companies have since eliminated traditional procaine hydrochloride from the formula.

== Awards ==
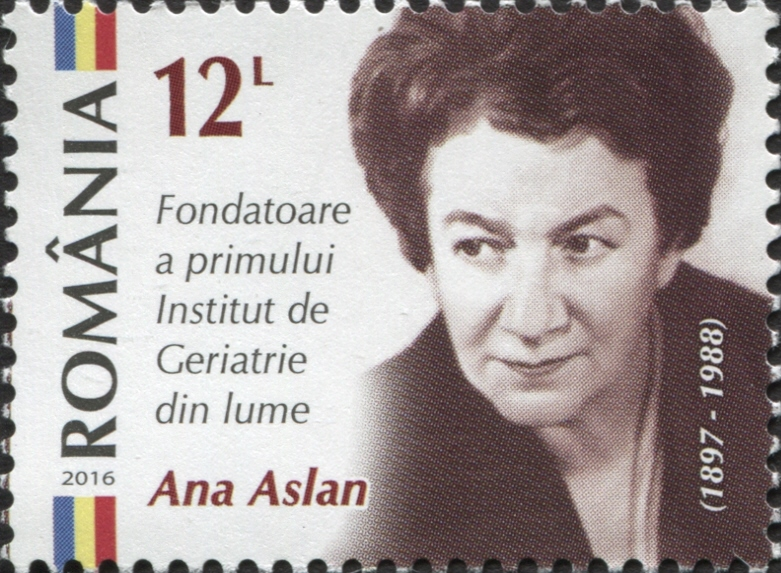
Aslan on a 2016 Romanian stamp

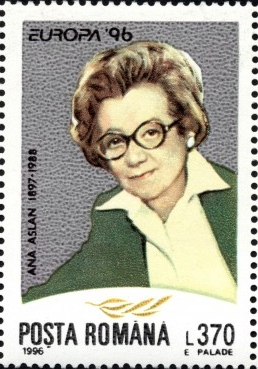
Aslan on a 1996 Romanian stamp

Ana Aslan received many awards and distinctions through her career, including:

- Member of the International Academy of Science, Munich and first Co-President
- "Cross of Merit" – First Class of the Order of Merit, Germany, 1971
- "Cavalier de la Nouvelle Europe" Prize Oscar, Italy, 1973
- "Les Palmes Academiques", France, 1974
- Honorary Foreign Citizen and Honorary Professor of Sciences, Philippines, 1978
- "Member Honoris Causa" Diploma of the Czechoslovakian Society of Gerontology, 1981
- "Leon Bernard Foundation Prize", granted by the World Health Organization (upon nomination and endorsement by Nicolae Ceaușescu) for contributing to the development of gerontology and geriatrics, 1982
