= Gerovital =

Pseudoscientific anti-aging treatment

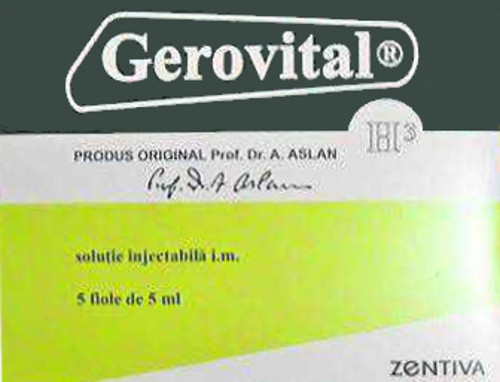
Original presentation of Gerovital

Gerovital H3 (or procaine hydrochloride and products known as GH3 and other variants, which may or may not be identical to Gerovital H3) is a preparation developed during the 1950s and promoted by its advocates as an effective anti-aging treatment. In the United States, the FDA bans Gerovital H3 from interstate commerce as an unapproved drug and, since 1982, has prohibited its importation.

Gerovital is promoted with unsupported claims of its curative abilities for a wide range of human ailments; research has found no evidence that it has any health benefit or "anti-aging" properties.

== Development and marketing ==
The impetus for developing the drug is sometimes alleged to have come from Nicolae Ceaușescu, who is also wrongly claimed to have funded the establishment of a research organization - the National Institute of Geriatrics, in Bucharest, Romania, headed by Ana Aslan (1897–1988).

From the 1950s until her death in 1988, Aslan promoted Gerovital H3 with great success. In the 1960s and 1970s her Romanian clinic, the Parhon Institute, became a mecca for celebrities seeking treatment, and an upscale tourist attraction. The New York Times referred to Gerovital's "jet-set aura", noting that Aslan had been covered in "society columns where such public figures as Nikita S. Khrushchev, Konrad Adenauer, and Ibn Saud have been listed among the multitudes said to have taken the drug." As late as 1988, an advertisement by the Romanian National Tourist Office lauded "the picturesque and exciting cities, scenic delights, famous resorts (including Gerovital H3 treatment centers), cultural and historic treasures that await the traveler to Romania."

With the rise of the Web Gerovital has enjoyed a new lease of promotional life as it is promoted by many sites with claims of its "cure-all" abilities.

== Denouncement ==
A 1973 New York Times article said "cold water was thrown on [Gerovital]'s reputation years ago" by "three reports published simultaneously in British Medical Journal [that said it] found no merit for procaine hydrochloride for any of the problems of aging."

Some clinical trials in the mid-to-late 1970s suggested that Gerovital H3 acts as a weak, competitive, reversible MAO inhibitor, and so may have some antidepressant value, but otherwise has a negligible effect on disease. In 1994, the U.S. FDA Consumer magazine said: "No health claims for Gerovital have been substantiated, and FDA considers it an unapproved new drug. It has caused low blood pressure, respiratory difficulties, and convulsions in some users." Suppliers assert that the product is safe, and one cites a brief quotation from a newspaper article that says "while as early as 1973 Elmer Gardner of the FDA's Bureau of Drugs stated 'There is no safety problem with Gerovital H-3.'"

== Effectiveness ==
There is no evidence that Gerovital is helpful in slowing aging or treating illness.

== Drug or nutrient? ==
Procaine itself is often considered to be a drug. Earlier references by advocates of Gerovital H3 refer to it as a drug. Hoffer and Walker (1980) call it a "youth drug". Mircea Dumitru, Aslan's colleague and personal physician, describes it as "a complex drug acting like the procaine molecule. The addition of benzoic acid, potassium and disodium phosphate increase the effects of Gerovital-H3 biotrophic treatment."

== FDA ban ==
As of 2004, the FDA's 1982 automatic detention alert is still in effect and bans the import of Gerovital H3 into the U.S. as "a new drug within the meaning of 201(p), without an approved new drug application [Unapproved New Drug, Section 505(a)]."

The ban covers:

- Gerovital, GH3, KH3, Zell H3, GH3 etc. This order was rescinded for GEROVITAL Cosmetics Lines, not containing procaine.
- Finished injectable or oral Procaine Hydrochloride
