= Biochemical engineering =

Manufacturing by chemical reactions of biological organisms

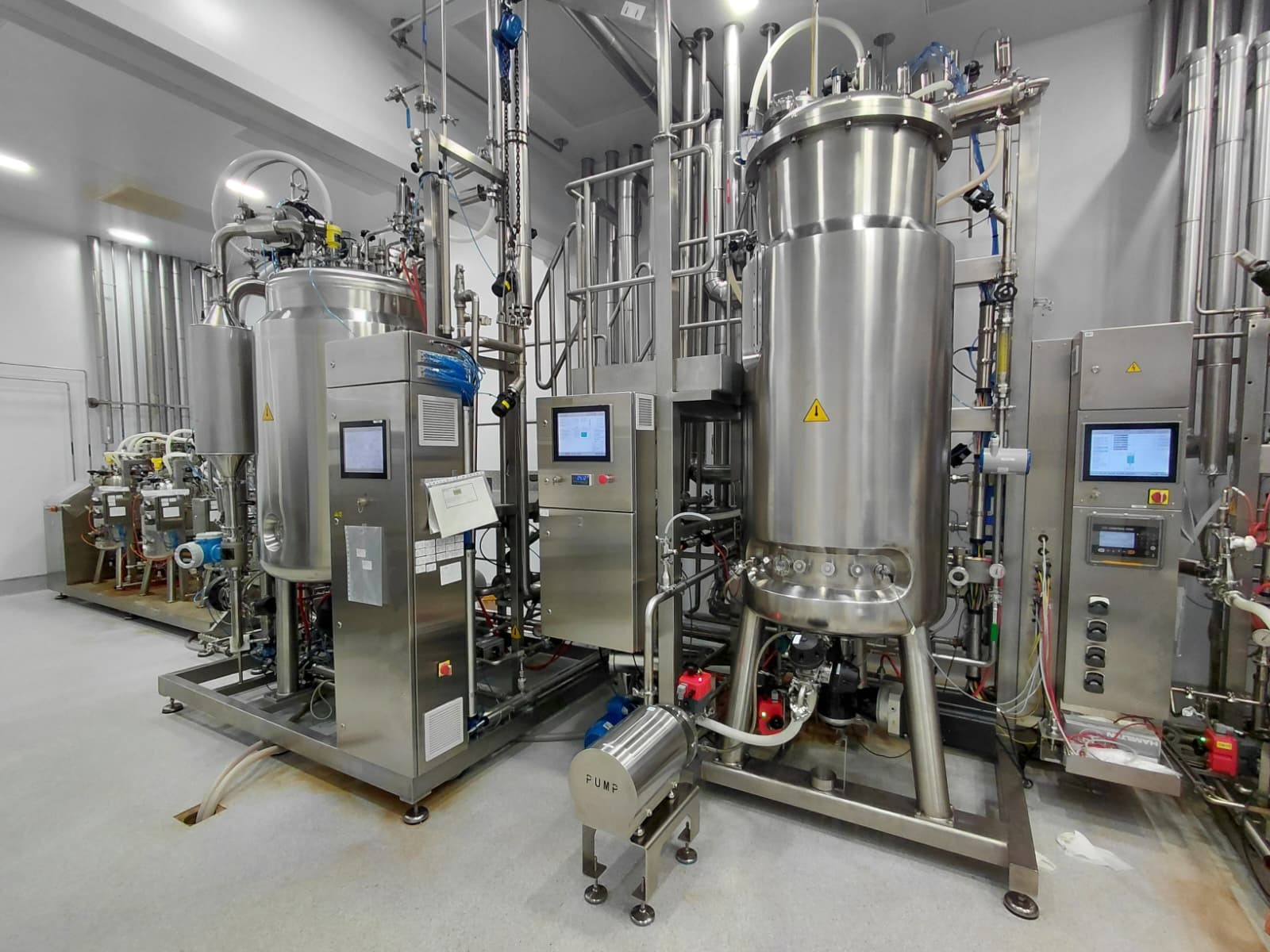
Bioreactor and Tangential flow filtration system

Biochemical engineering, also known as bioprocess engineering, is a field of study with roots stemming from chemical engineering and biological engineering. It mainly deals with the design, construction, and advancement of unit processes that involve biological organisms (such as fermentation) or organic molecules (often enzymes) and has various applications in areas of interest such as biofuels, food, pharmaceuticals, biotechnology, and water treatment processes. The role of a biochemical engineer is to take findings developed by biologists and chemists in a laboratory and translate that to a large-scale manufacturing process.

== History ==
For hundreds of years, humans have made use of the chemical reactions of biological organisms in order to create goods. In the mid-1800s, Louis Pasteur was one of the first people to look into the role of these organisms when he researched fermentation.His work also contributed to the use of pasteurization, which is still used to this day. By the early 1900s, the use of microorganisms had expanded and was used to make industrial products. Up to this point, biochemical engineering hadn't developed as a field yet. It wasn't until 1928, when Alexander Fleming discovered penicillin, that the field of biochemical engineering was established. After this discovery, samples were gathered from around the world in order to continue research into the characteristics of microbes from places such as soils, gardens, forests, rivers, and streams. Today, biochemical engineers can be found working in a variety of industries, from food to pharmaceuticals. This is due to the increasing need for efficiency and production which requires knowledge of how biological systems and chemical reactions interact with each other and how they can be used to meet these needs.

== Applications ==
Applications biochemical engineering

=== Biotechnology ===
Biotechnology and biochemical engineering are closely related to each other as biochemical engineering can be considered a sub-branch of biotechnology. One of the primary focuses of biotechnology is in the medical field, where biochemical engineers work to design pharmaceuticals, artificial organs, biomedical devices, chemical sensors, and drug delivery systems. Biochemical engineers use their knowledge of chemical processes in biological systems in order to create tangible products that improve people's health. Specific areas of studies include metabolic, enzyme, and tissue engineering. The study of cell cultures is widely used in biochemical engineering and biotechnology due to its many applications in developing natural fuels, improving the efficiency of drug production and pharmaceutical processes, and creating cures for diseases. Other medical applications of biochemical engineering within biotechnology are genetic testing and pharmacogenomics.

=== Food industry ===
Biochemical engineers primarily focus on designing systems that will improve the production, processing, packaging, storage, and distribution of food. Some commonly processed foods include wheat, fruits, and milk, which undergo processes such as milling, dehydration, and pasteurization in order to become products that can be sold.

There are three levels of food processing: primary, secondary, and tertiary. Primary food processing involves turning agricultural products into other products that can be turned into food. Secondary food processing is the making of food from readily available ingredients. Tertiary food processing is commercial production of ready-to eat or heat-and-serve foods. Drying, pickling, salting, and fermenting foods were some of the oldest food processing techniques used to preserve food by preventing the growth of entities which cause food to spoil, such as yeasts, molds, and bacteria. Methods for preserving food have evolved to meet modern food safety standards, but many methods still involve the same processes as were used in the past.

Biochemical engineers also work to improve the nutritional value of food products, such as in golden rice, which was developed to prevent vitamin A deficiency in locations where this was an issue. Packaging protects food products from contamination, physical damage, and tampering and preserves nutrients. Packaging can also make it easier to transport and serve food.

A common job for biochemical engineers working in the food industry is to design ways to perform all these processes on a large scale in order to meet the demands of the population. Responsibilities for this career path include designing and performing experiments, optimizing processes, consulting with groups to develop new technologies, and preparing project plans for equipment and facilities.

=== Pharmaceuticals ===
In the pharmaceutical industry, bioprocess engineering plays a crucial role in the large-scale production of biopharmaceuticals, such as monoclonal antibodies, vaccines, and therapeutic proteins. The development and optimization of bioreactors and fermentation systems are essential for the mass production of these products, ensuring consistent quality and high yields. For example, recombinant proteins like insulin and erythropoietin are produced through cell culture systems using genetically modified (or genetically engineered) cells. The bioprocess engineer’s role is to optimize variables like temperature, pH, nutrient availability, and oxygen levels to maximize the efficiency of these systems. The growing field of gene therapy also relies on bioprocessing techniques to produce viral vectors, which are used to deliver therapeutic genes to patients. This involves scaling up processes from laboratory to industrial scale while maintaining safety and regulatory compliance. As the demand for biopharmaceutical products increases, advancements in bioprocess engineering continue to enable more sustainable and cost-effective manufacturing methods.

== Education ==
- Auburn University
- University of Georgia (Biochemical Engineering)
- Michigan Technological University
- McMaster University
- Technical University of Munich
- Karlsruhe Institute of Technology
- University of Natural Resources and Life Sciences, Vienna
- Keck Graduate Institute of Applied Life Sciences (KGI Amgen Bioprocessing Center)
- Kungliga Tekniska högskolan- KTH – Royal Institute of Technology (Dept. of Industrial Biotechnology)
- Queensland University of Technology (QUT)
- University of Cape Town (Centre for Bioprocess Engineering Research)
- SUNY-ESF (Bioprocess Engineering Program)
- Université de Sherbrooke
- University of British Columbia
- UC Berkeley
- UC Davis
- Savannah Technical College
- University of Illinois Urbana-Champaign (Integrated Bioprocessing Research Laboratory)
- University of Iowa (Chemical and Biochemical Engineering)
- University of Minnesota (Bioproducts and Biosystems Engineering)
- East Carolina University
- Jacob School of Biotechnology and Bioengineering, Allahabad, India
- Indian Institute of Technology, Varanasi
- Indian Institute of Technology Kharagpur
- Institute of Chemical Technology, Mumbai
- Jadavpur University
- Universidade Federal de Itajubá (UNIFEI)
- Universiti Malaysia Kelantan (UMK)
- Universidade Federal de São João del Rei-UFSJ
- Federal University of Technology – Paraná
- Universidade Federal do Paraná-UFPR
- São Paulo State University
- Universidade Federal do Pará-UFPA
- University of Louvain (UCLouvain)
- University of Stellenbosch
- North Carolina Agricultural and Technical State University
- North Carolina State University
- Virginia Tech
- Ege University/Turkey (Department of Bioengineering)
- National University of Costa Rica
- University of Brawijaya (Department of Agricultural Engineering)
- University of Indonesia
- University College London (Department of Biochemical Engineering)
- Universiti Teknologi Malaysia
- Universiti Kuala Lumpur Malaysian Institute of Chemical and Bioengineering Technology
- University of Zagreb, Faculty of food technology and biotechnology, Croatia
- Villanova University
- Wageningen University
- University College Dublin
- Obafemi Awolowo University
- University of Birmingham
- Universidad Autónoma de Coahuila (Facultad de Ciencias Biológicas)
- Silpakorn University Thailand
- Universiti Malaysia Perlis (UniMAP), School of Bioprocess Engineering (SBE)
- Technische Universität Berlin, Chair of Bioprocess Engineering
- University of Queensland
- Technical University of Denmark, Department of Chemical and Biochemical Engineering, BioEng Research Centre
- South Dakota School of Mines and Technology
- National Institute of Applied Science and Technology Tunis (Industrial Biology Engineering Program)
- Technical University Hamburg (TUHH)
- Mapua University

Biochemical engineering is not a major offered by many universities and is instead an area of interest under the chemical engineering. The following universities are known to offer degrees in biochemical engineering:

- Brown University – Providence, RI
- Christian Brothers University – Memphis, TN
- Colorado School of Mines – Golden, CO
- Rowan University – Glassboro, NJ
- University of Colorado Boulder – Boulder, CO
- University of Georgia – Athens, GA
- University of California, Davis – Davis, CA
- University College London – London, United Kingdom
- University of Southern California – Los Angeles, CA
- University of Western Ontario – Ontario, Canada
- Indian Institute of Technology (BHU) Varanasi – Varanasi, UP
- Indian Institute of Technology Delhi – Delhi
- Institute of Technology Tijuana – México
- University of Baghdad, College of Engineering, Al-Khwarizmi Biochemical
- Universidad Nacional de Río Negro - Río Negro, Argentina

== See also ==
- Biofuel from algae
- Biological hydrogen production (algae)
- Bioprocess
- Bioproducts engineering
- Bioproducts
- Bioreactor landfill
- Biosystems engineering
- Cell therapy
- Downstream (bioprocess)
- Electrochemical energy conversion
- Industrial biotechnology
- Microbiology
- Moss bioreactor
- Photobioreactor
- Physical chemistry
- Unit operations
- Upstream (bioprocess)
