= Biorefining =

Refinement process

Biorefining is the process of "building" multiple products from biomass as a feedstock or raw material much like a petroleum refinery that is currently in use.

The process of biorefining can be characterized as the sustainable processing of biomass, which eventually yields:

- biobased products, such as food, feed, chemicals or other materials, and/or
- bioenergy, such as biofuels, power or heat.

A biorefinery is a facility like a petroleum refinery that comprises the various process steps or unit operations and related equipment to produce various bioproducts including fuels, power, materials and chemicals from biomass. Industrial biorefineries have been identified as the most promising route to the creation of a new domestic biobased industry producing entire spectrum of bioproducts or bio-based products.

Biomass has various components such as lignin, cellulose, hemicelluloses, extractives, etc. Biorefinery can take advantage of the unique properties of each of biomass components enabling the production of various products. The various bioproducts can include fiber, fuels, chemicals, plastics etc.

== Processes ==
Biorefining processes can be categorized into four groups:

1. Mechanical
2. Biochemical
3. Chemical
4. Thermochemical

== See also ==
- Biomass
- Biomass (ecology)
- Forest
- Agriculture
- Biogas
- Bioenergy
- Biofuels
- Biochemicals
- Bioproducts
