= Bioenvironmental Engineering =

Bioenvironmental Engineers (BEEs) within the United States Air Force (USAF) blend the understanding of fundamental engineering principles with a broad preventive medicine mission to identify, evaluate and recommend controls for hazards that could harm USAF Airmen, employees, and their families. The information from these evaluations helps BEEs design control measures and make recommendations that prevent illness and injury across multiple specialty areas, to include: Occupational Health, Environmental Health, Radiation Safety, and Emergency Response. BEEs are provided both initial and advanced instruction at the United States Air Force School of Aerospace Medicine at Wright-Patterson Air Force Base in Dayton, Ohio.

== History ==
Bioenvironmental Engineering
- Active: 1947 - Present
- Country: United States
- Branch: United States Air Force
- Motto: "Garrison equals deployed"
- Colors: Yellow and Black
- Mascot: BEE

During the 1970s, the United States Air Force (USAF) saw a need to implement measures to protect the health of their personnel. They took elements of Military Public Health and spun off a separate arm called Bioenvironmental Engineering. From that point on, Bioenvironmental Engineering had taken the lead in protecting the health of USAF workers.

The original group of Bioenvironmental Engineers (BEEs) came to the Air Force from the U.S. Army in 1947 when the Air Force was formed. They were an outgrowth of the U.S. Army Sanitary Corps. Until 1964, Air Force BEEs were called Sanitary and Industrial Hygiene Engineers. They were Medical Service Corps (MSC) officers until the Biomedical Sciences Corps (BSC) was created in 1965.

Between 1960 and 1970, the BEE field grew from around 100 to 150 members. However, beginning in 1970, with the formation of the Occupational Safety and Health Administration (OSHA), the U.S. Environmental Protection Agency (EPA), and the Nuclear Regulatory Commission, the career field experienced exponential growth in Federal regulations. These laws required BEEs to monitor Air Force operations for their effects on personnel and the environment. Several major catastrophes and other events focused keen Congressional interest on environment, safety and occupational health (ESOH), leading to new, mandatory compliance programs. Love Canal, Bhopal, atmospheric ozone depletion, and other incidents spawned new laws governing the Installation Restoration Program; Hazard Communication; community-right-to-know; Process Safety Management; and hazardous material inventory, control, and reduction. These have continually driven additional, corresponding requirements for BEEs.

In the early 1980s, a major shift in functions occurred. The clinical and sanitary aspects of the BEE program, (communicable disease, sanitary surveys, vector control, and occupational medicine) were turned over to the newly forming environmental health officers. This enabled the BEE force to concentrate its efforts on the industrial work place and the environment.

The importance of ensuring Air Force compliance with ESOH requirements is now higher than ever. Public awareness/concern/disclosure, the recognition of risk analysis/communication/management, loss of sovereign immunity of federal agencies, and the personal liability of commanders for environmental infractions are all impacting BEE surveillance programs. Increased environmental pollution prevention and occupational health preventive medicine programs are shifting the emphasis to avoiding problems before they occur.

== Occupational health ==
Bioenvironmental Engineers conduct health risk assessments (HRAs) in and around workplaces, protecting Airmen and employees from the hazards associated with their duties, very similar in nature to industrial or occupational hygiene. HRAs with recommendations to reduce or eliminate risk are sent to relevant parties for their consideration and to advise them on the impacts and risks to their subordinates and their mission(s). BEEs fundamentally analyze and recommend controls for identified occupational health (OH) risks to include employee exposure to Occupational Safety and Health Administration (OSHA) expanded standard chemicals listed under 29 CFR 1910 (Subpart Z), immediately dangerous to life or health (IDLH) conditions found within confined spaces, and musculoskeletal disorders introduced by ergonomic stresses (such as repetitive motion/vibration/biomechanical stresses). BEEs routinely monitor local exhaust ventilation systems controlling airborne hazards across an installation to limit exposures a worker may receive. In conjunction with ventilation, BEEs also oversee the Respiratory Protection Program associated with each installation; BEEs ensure personnel are trained on the proper wear of an occupationally-required respirator, have a respirator fit test conducted, and know how to properly don/doff their personal protective equipment to protect them from inhalation hazards imposed by their tasks. BEEs are the installation authority regarding hazardous materials and personal protective equipment certification for use on an Air Force Base. Though not required, common OH certifications attained by BEEs include: Certified Industrial Hygienist (CIH) through the Board for Global EHS Credentialing (formerly the American Board of Industrial Hygiene) and Certified Safety Professional (CSP) through the Board of Certified Safety Professionals.

== Environmental health ==
Bioenvironmental Engineers serve as installation liaisons for federal, state, and local organizations regarding drinking water quality and assess for environmental contaminants on Air Force Bases, annually publishing a consumer confidence report to keep the base populace informed on the quality of their drinking water. A frequent concern on Air Force Bases is exposure to occupational noise hazards, as tinnitus is the most prevalent service-connected disability claimed by veterans through the United States Department of Veterans Affairs as of 2020, accounting for ~8% of all disabilities. To address this concern, BEEs routinely conduct noise dosimetry on personnel to identify and isolate excessive noise-producing equipment in the workplace. BEEs also conduct Occupational and Environmental Health Site Assessments (OEHSA) to identify and mitigate risks to personnel from their jobs, duties, and environment on an Air Force Base and its GSUs. Additionally, BEEs assess indoor air quality for airborne dusts, fumes, mists, fogs, vapors, and gases, frequently quantifying through exposure monitoring and documentation of worker exposures. Furthermore, BEEs routinely monitor for Thermal Stress (to include heat stress and cold stress) on an installation and publish flag conditions associated with recommended work-rest cycles and hydration guidelines, allowing supervisors and workers to remain safe.

== Radiation safety ==
Bioenvironmental Engineers typically concurrently serve as Installation Radiation Safety Officers (IRSO) and Installation Laser Safety Officers (LSO) on an Air Force Base and its GSUs, overseeing and authorizing the transport and use of radioactive materials, Nuclear Regulatory Commission (NRC) Permits, ionizing and non-ionizing radiation sources, and lasers. A key component to protecting personnel from radiation is routine exposure monitoring, managed by the BEEs through a thermoluminescent dosimetry (TLD) program that maintains oversight of all radiation worker exposures installation-wide.

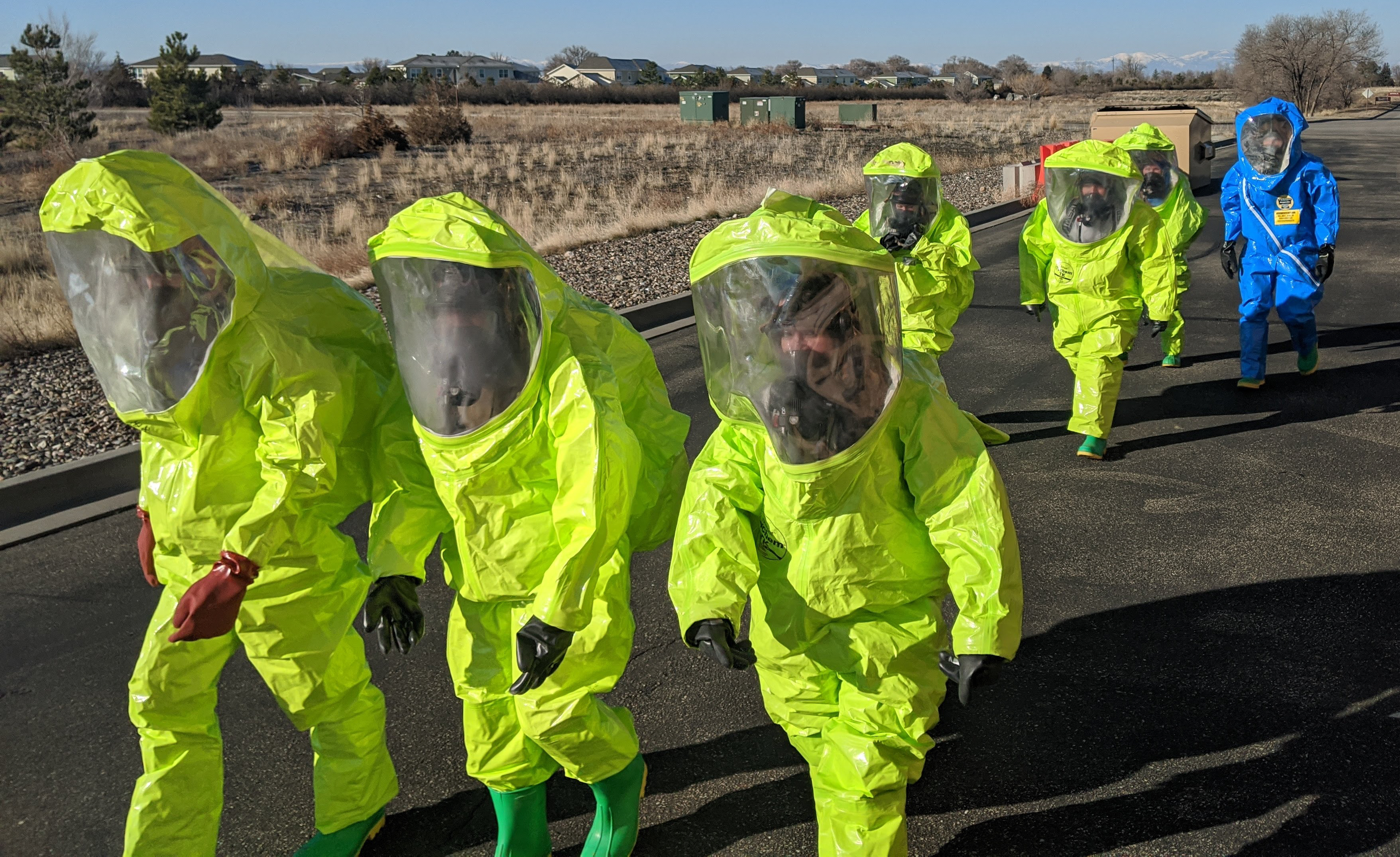
Emergency Response Training

== Emergency response ==
Bioenvironmental Engineers serve as emergency responders and health risk advisors for Chemical, Biological, Radiological, and Nuclear hazards, incidents, and their associated personal protective equipment (or clothing). BEEs are also HAZWOPER-certified, providing risk assessments and communication regarding hazardous materials. However, what BEEs are typically known for on an installation is the customer-oriented service they provide in the form of gas mask fit tests. BEEs routinely respond to emergencies alongside Emergency Management.

== Significant examples of BEE support ==
- 2015 - 2021 - Operation Freedom's Sentinel
- 2012 - Water Sampling and Safety during Hurricane Sandy
- 2011 - Radiation Risk Communication and Dosimetry Support for Operation Tomadachi during the Fukushima nuclear disaster
- 2001 - 2014 - Operation Enduring Freedom

== See also ==
- United States Air Force Medical Service
- Biomedical Sciences Corp
- Exposure action value
- Air Force Specialty Code
- Occupational hygiene
