= Bioprocess =

Process that uses living cells to obtain desired products

A bioprocess is a specific process that uses complete living cells or their components (e.g., bacteria, enzymes, chloroplasts) to obtain desired products.

Transport of energy and mass is fundamental to many biological and environmental processes. Areas, from food processing (including brewing beer) to thermal design of buildings to biomedical devices, manufacture of monoclonal antibodies to pollution control, require knowledge of how energy and mass can be transported through materials (momentum, heat transfer, etc.).

== Cell bioprocessing ==
Cell therapy bioprocessing is a discipline that bridges the fields of cell therapy and bioprocessing (i.e., biopharmaceutical manufacturing), and is a sub-field of bioprocess engineering. The goals of cell therapy bioprocessing are to establish reproducible and robust manufacturing processes for the production of therapeutic cells. Commercially relevant bioprocesses will:

1. Produce products that maintain all of the quality standards of biopharmaceutical drugs. Consequently, real-time monitoring and quality control tools, such as time-resolved spectroscopy, are crucial.
2. Supply both clinical and commercial quantities of therapeutic cells throughout the various stages of development. The processes and production technologies must be scalable, and
3. Control the cost of goods (CoGs) of the final drug product. This aspect is critical to building the foundation for a commercially viable industry.

== Upstream bioprocessing ==
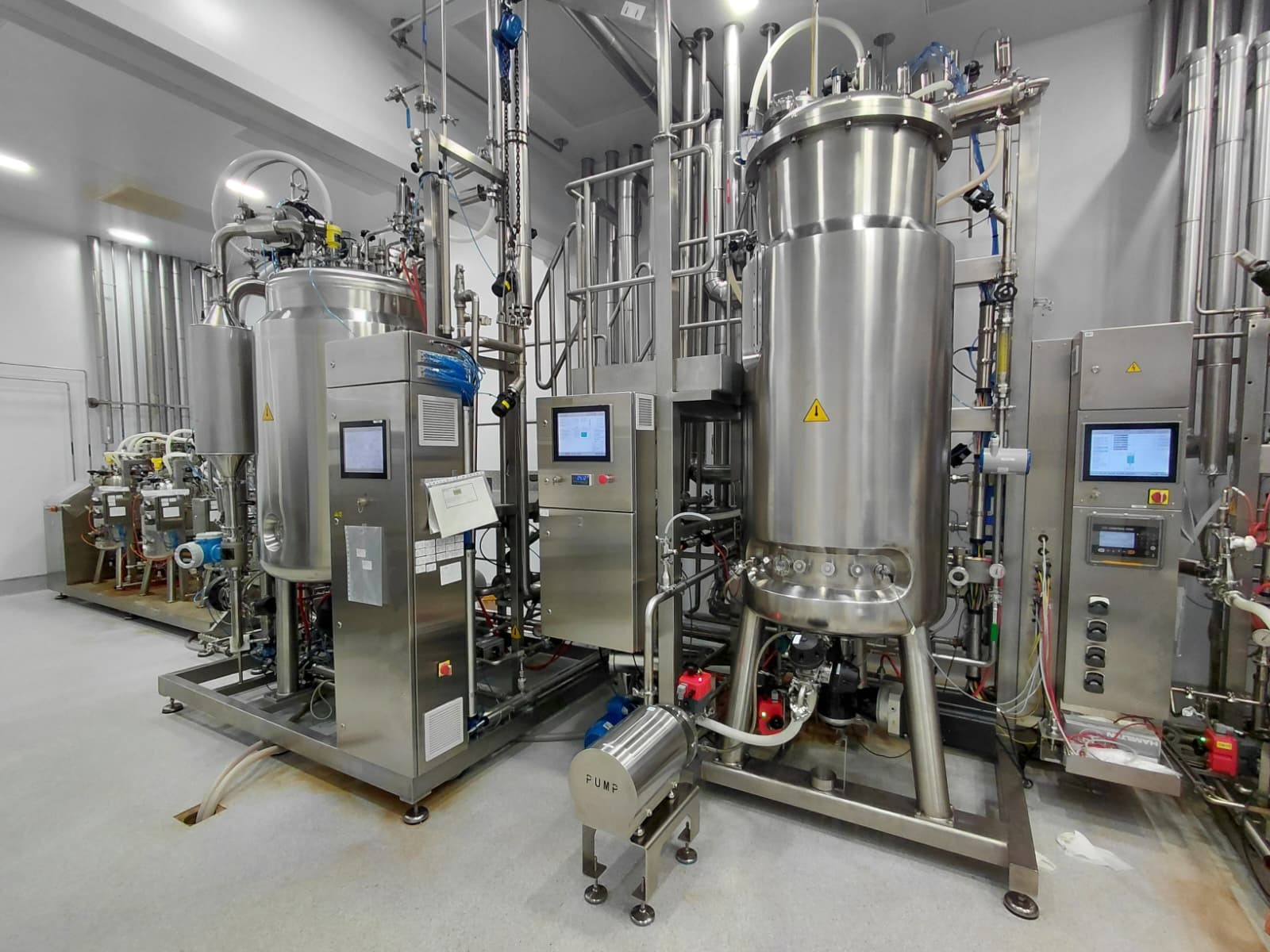
A 500-liter stainless-steel industrial bioreactor together with a tangential flow filtration system.

Therapeutic cell manufacturing processes can be separated into upstream processes and downstream processes. The upstream process is defined as the entire process from early cell isolation and cultivation, to cell banking and culture expansion of the cells until final harvest (termination of the culture and collection of the live cell batch).

Aside from technology challenges, concerning the scalability of culture apparatus, a number of raw material supply risks have emerged in recent years, including the availability of GMP grade fetal bovine serum.

The upstream part of a bioprocess refers to the first step in which microbes/cells are grown, e.g. bacterial or mammalian cell lines (see cell culture), in bioreactors. Upstream processing involves all the steps related to inoculum development, media development, improvement of inoculum by genetic engineering process, optimization of growth kinetics so that product development can improve tremendously. Fermentation has two parts: upstream and downstream. After product development, the next step is the purification of product for desired quality. When they reach the desired density (for batch and fed-batch cultures) they are harvested and moved to the downstream section of the bioprocess.

== Downstream bioprocessing ==
The downstream part of a bioprocess refers to the part where the cell mass from the upstream are processed to meet purity and quality requirements. Downstream processing is usually divided into three main sections: cell disruption, a purification section and a polishing section.

The volatile products can be separated by distillation of the harvested culture without pre-treatment. Distillation is done at reduced pressure at continuous stills. At reduced pressure, distillation of product directly from fermentor may be possible. The steps of downstream processing are:

1. Separation of biomass: separating the biomass (microbial cells) generally carried out by centrifugation or ultra-centrifugation. If the product is biomass, then it is recovered for processing and spent medium is discarded. If the product is extra cellular the biomass will be discarded. Ultra filtration is an alternative to the centrifugation.
2. Cell disruption: If the desired product is intra cellular the cell biomass can be disrupted so that the product should be released. The solid-liquid is separated by centrifugation or filtration and cell debris is discarded.
3. Concentration of broth: The spent medium is concentrated if the product is extracellular.
4. Initial purification of metabolites: According to the physico-chemical nature of the product molecule several methods for recovery of product from the clarified fermented broth were used (precipitation, etc.)
5. De-watering: If low amount of product is found in very large volume of spent medium, the volume is reduced by removing water to concentrate the product. It is done by vacuum drying or reverse osmosis.
6. Polishing of metabolites: this is the final step of making the product 98 to 100% pure. The purified product is mixed with several inert ingredients called excipients. The formulated product is packed and sent to the market for the consumers.

== See also ==
- Adverse drug reaction
- Adverse event
- Assay sensitivity
- Biomanufacturing
- Bioprocess engineering
- Biotechnology
- Caco-2
- Clinical study design
- Good clinical practice
- Good manufacturing practice
- Keck Graduate Institute of Applied Life Sciences (KGI Amgen Bioprocessing Center)
