= Bioresource engineering =

Engineering subfield

Bioresource engineering is an engineering discipline of researching, developing, and utilizing bioproducts.

It is similar to biological engineering, except that it is based on biological and/or agricultural feedstocks. Bioresource engineering is more general and encompasses a wider range of technologies and various elements such as biomass, biological waste treatment, bioenergy, biotransformations, bioresource systems analysis, bioremediation and technologies associated with Thermochemical conversion technologies such as combustion, pyrolysis, gasification, catalysis, etc.

Bioresource engineering also contains biochemical conversion technologies such as aerobic methods, anaerobic digestion, microbial growth processes, enzymatic methods, and composting. Products include fibre, fuels, feedstocks, fertilisers, building materials, polymers and other industrial products, and management products e.g. modelling, systems analysis, decisions, and support systems. Bioresource engineering is a discipline that is usually very similar to environmental engineering.

The impact of urbanization and increasing demand for food, water and land presents bioresource engineers with the task of bridging the gap between the biological world and traditional engineering. Agricultural and bioresource engineers attempt to develop efficient and environmentally sensitive methods of producing food, fiber, timber, bio-based products and renewable energy sources for an ever-increasing world population. Some of the research in bioresource engineering include machine vision, vehicle modification, wastewater irrigation, irrigation water management, stormwater management, inside natural environment for animals and plants, sensors, non-point source pollution and animal manure management.

== Accomplishments ==
A biosynthesis of silver nanoparticles (NPs) mediated by fungal proteins of Coriolus versicolor has been undertaken for the first time in 2008. Hydrogels have been used to separate As(V) from water.

== ATCC ==
Founded in 1925, the ATCC (American Type Culture Collection) is a nonprofit and research organization, whose mission focuses on the acquisition, production, and development of standard reference microorganisms, cell lines and other materials for research in life sciences. ATCC has collected a wide range of biological items for research. Their holdings include molecular genomics tools, microorganisms and bioproducts.

== See also ==
- Environmentalist
